= Opposition to Francoism =

Political movements opposing Franco's dictatorship

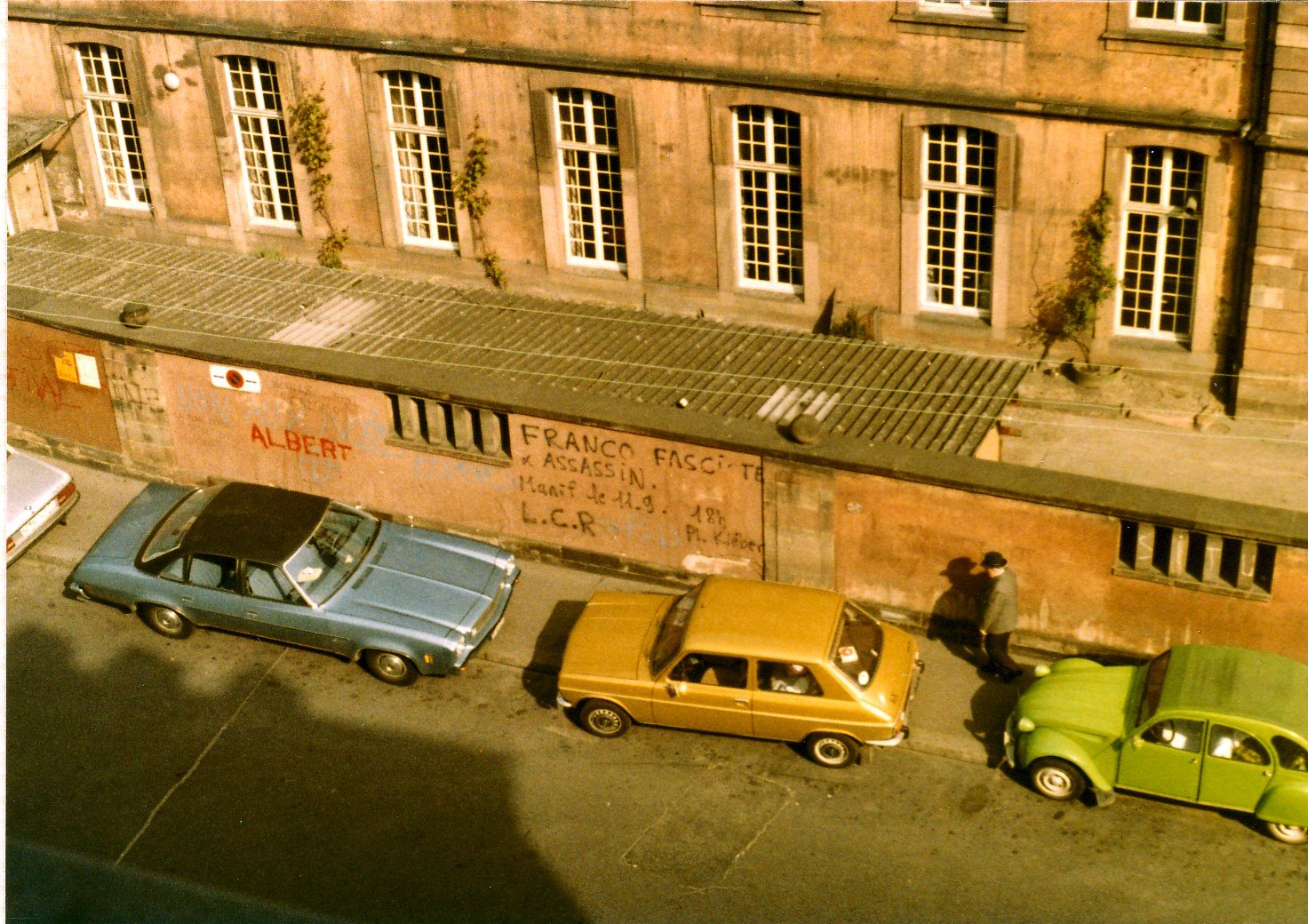
- LCR graffiti in Strasbourg calling for an anti-Franco demonstration, French Fifth Republic 1977
- Date: 1938–1977
- Location: Francoist Spain
- Caused by: Spanish coup of July 1936
- Goals: To depose the dictatorship of Francisco Franco

Parties
Anarchists: MLE; CNT; FAI; FIJL; Marxists: Unión Nacional Española; PCE; PSOE; JSU; Democratic Junta of Spain; And other smaller groups Supported by Soviet Union Separatist Movements; ETA; Catalonia Liberals; Spanish Republican government in exile Spanish Democratic Alliance (ADE); Democratic Convergence Platform; And other smaller groups Supported by French Resistance; Mexico; United Kingdom Student Movements	Government; Francoist Spain: FET y de las JONS; Supported byVatican City; Nazi Germany (until 1945); United States (after 1953)	Monarchists; Requetés/CR; Supported byVatican City; United Kingdom Anti-Franco Falangists; Authentic Falange; Revolutionary Syndicalist Front; National Front of Free Alliance; And other smaller groups Supported byNazi Germany (until 1945)

Lead figures
Juan García Oliver; Aurelio Fernández Sánchez; Esteban Pallarols Jesús Monzón; Ramón Rubial; Antonio García-Trevijano Diego Martínez Barrio	(Francoist Spain) Francisco Franco (Francoist Spain) Luis Carrero Blanco (Francoist Spain) Ramón Serrano Suñer (Francoist Spain) Carlos Asensio Cabanillas (Francoist Spain) José Moscardó Ituarte	Infante Juan; Luis Orgaz Yoldi; Antonio Aranda Manuel Hedilla

Opposition to Francoism, anti-Francoism and at that time simply opposition, is the denomination given to the group of political and social movements that opposed Franco's regime or dictatorship from the end of the Spanish Civil War (1939) until the first democratic elections (1977), a year and a half after his death (1975).

== Resistance in the insurgent region (1936–1939) ==
Before the end of the Spanish Civil War, it can be observed that there were signs of opposition in the Francoist zone, controlled by the nascent Franco regime: in December 1936 the attempt by Manuel Fal Conde, leader of Traditionalist Communion, to create a Royal Military Academy of Requetés that was not under the control of the Army resulted in his immediate departure from the country amidst accusations of treason. On April 16, 1937, violent incidents took place in Salamanca between members of different factions within the Falange Española y de las JONS (the faction of the triumvirate between Agustín Aznar, José Moreno and Sancho Dávila against the faction of Manuel Hedilla), as a result there were two fatalities and on April 25 of the same year Manuel Hedilla, leader until that moment of the FE y de las JONS, was accused of having conspired against Franco and was condemned to two death sentences. These first frictions within the ranks of the rebels would be stopped by the Unification Decree of 1937, which led to the creation of the FET y de las JONS, conceived as the political branch of the so-called Movimiento Nacional.

== Opposition to Francoism in 1939 and 1945 ==
=== Beginnings of the opposition in the interior of Spain ===
In the interior of Spain the first two organizations of the defeated side to reorganize were the CNT and the PCE, even though the conditions in which they did so were harsh: "an environment marked by hunger and disease, with thousands of people in prison or awaiting execution, while others made the traces of their Republican past disappear to avoid arrest and where the majority of the population depended for their subsistence on the straperlo, thus increasing their vulnerability towards the pressures of the state". Therefore, in both cases the clandestine activity was focused on helping their imprisoned militants and their families, providing them with money and seeking ways to free them or reduce their sentences, and giving shelter to those persecuted by the police.

However, the first unitary organization of the opposition to Francoism, the Spanish Democratic Alliance (ADE), was promoted by a group of exiled Republicans and its board of directors, constituted in the summer of 1940, was based in London. However, "the ADE was little more than a front for the activities of the British secret information services and their Spanish collaborators in the interior". It had a short life because the Francoist police managed to infiltrate the organization and arrested some 200 people in Valencia, Madrid and other cities —ten were sentenced to death of which three were shot in Paterna in November—. After the invasion of France, the network of ADE agents, which operated from the Midi, was dismantled, and the British government ceased to support it so it disappeared at the end of 1940.

As for the anarchists, the first interior committee was formed by Esteban Pallarols, who had managed to escape from the Albatera camp, and who was in charge of creating a clandestine network to move to France the prisoners he managed to get out of the concentration camps by means of false documents. Pallarols was arrested by the police and condemned to death, being shot on July 18, 1943. He was replaced by Manuel López López, but he resigned soon after due to tuberculosis he had contracted during his stay in the Albatera camp, and was replaced by Celedonio Pérez Bernardo. He was also arrested, tried in September 1942 and sentenced to thirty years in prison. He was replaced by Manuel Amil Barcia, but he, stalked by the police, had to leave Madrid to take refuge in Andalusia, so the functions of the national committee were taken over by the Madrid organization headed by Eusebio Azañedo, who contacted the CNT of Valencia, which had been reorganized, and the CNT of Catalonia, whose situation was rather unclear due to the existence of two regional committees. As a result of the denunciation of a confidant, Acebedo was arrested in Madrid in the summer of 1943, so Amil returned to the capital to take charge again of the general secretariat of the national committee.

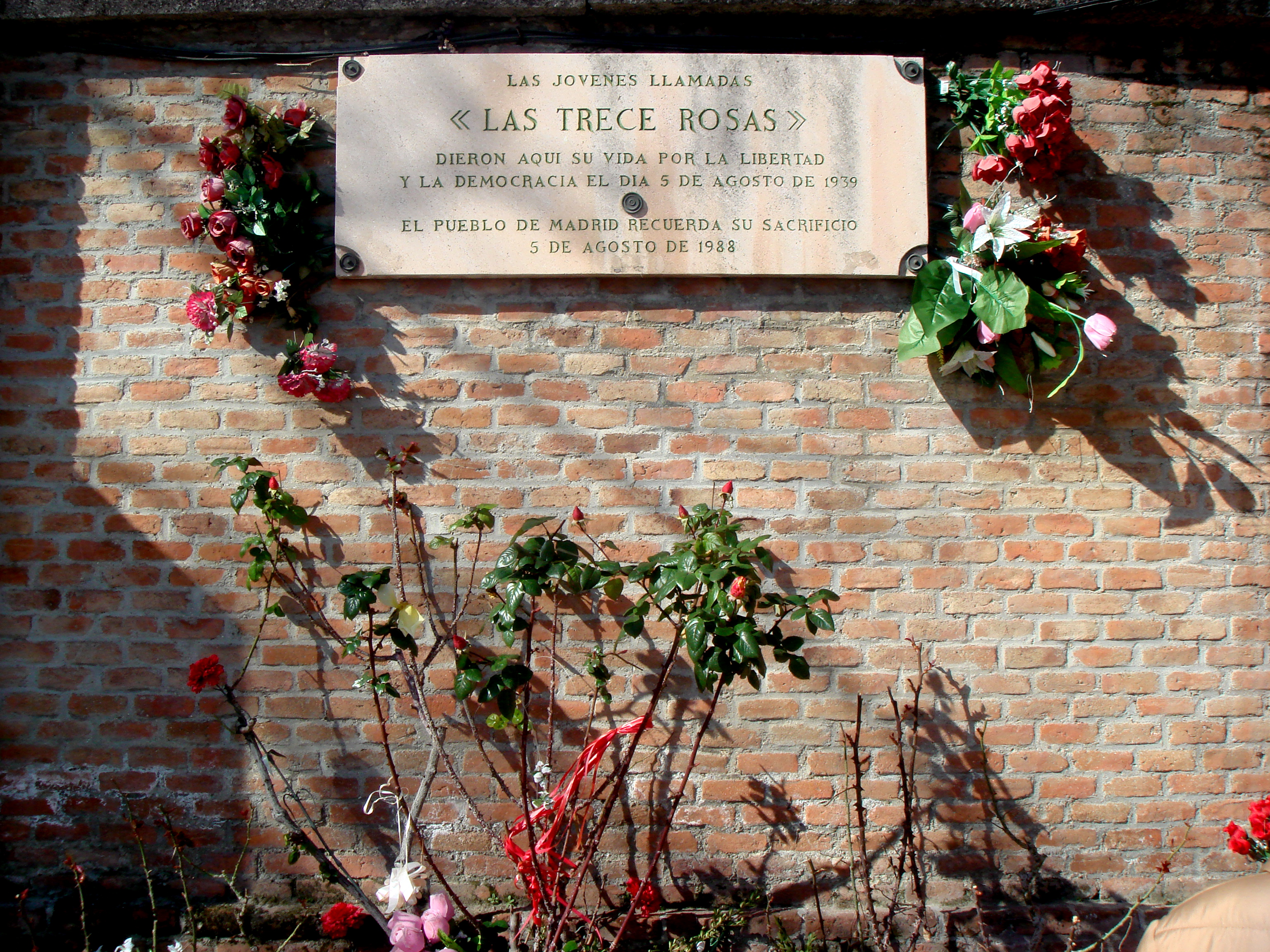
Monument to Las Trece Rosas, in the Almudena cemetery in Madrid.

As for the communists, the first organization of the party that was formed in hiding was in Madrid, where just after the end of the war a provincial committee was formed, headed by Matilde Landa and made up of several militants, some of them young members of the JSU. Some of its members were arrested by the police, who had obtained the files of the communist youth organization, being accused without any proof of having been preparing an attack against General Franco for the Victory Parade to be held on May 19, so a military court sentenced them to death and they were shot. Others were accused of being involved in the attack against Major Isaac Gabaldón, when he was traveling in his car near Talavera de la Reina. On August 4 a first summary court-martial was held in Madrid in which 65 of the 67 accused were condemned to death, being shot the following day; 63, among them thirteen young women, some of them minors, who would be known as "Las trece rosas". Matilde Landa was also arrested, as well as Enrique Sánchez and José Cazorla, leaders of the JSU, who had formed the first "delegation of the central committee" —the term used to refer to the clandestine communist leadership of the interior of Spain—, Sánchez and Cazorla were while Landa saw the sentence commuted to 30 years in prison, but in mid-1942 she could no longer withstand the psychological pressure to which she was subjected by the prison guards and the management of the Palma de Mallorca prison and committed suicide. The next attempt of the PCE to provide itself with an underground leadership was the work of Heriberto Quiñones, who escaped from the Albatera camp. Quiñones formed the Interior Committee in May 1941, which also included Luis Sendín and Julio Vázquez —the latter was arrested by the police on July 16, being replaced by Realino Fernández López Realinos, of the Communist Party of Euskadi—. Around the same time, mid-May, several communist cadres sent by the PCE leadership in Mexico arrived in Lisbon to take charge of the organization of the interior. But four months later the Portuguese police arrested the "Lisbon group" and the Spanish police arrested Quiñones' committee along with two hundred more communist militants. Quiñones himself was arrested on December 30, 1941, in Madrid's Alcalá Street along with Ángel Garvín, who had taken the place of Realinos —detained earlier— in the interior leadership. All the captured interior leaders were condemned to death and shot, as well as the members of the "Lisbon group", who had been extradited to Spain, except for one of them who would die in prison in 1947. The reaction of the PCE leadership in exile to this incident was to accuse Quiñones of being a traitor who had denounced his comrades of the "Lisbon group" to the police. To this very serious accusation was added that of "Trotskyist" —the worst label a communist could receive in the times of Stalinist orthodoxy—.

After the defeat of Quiñones, Jesús Bayón, a former collaborator of his, took over the communist leadership in the interior, which also included other former "quiñonistas" who had managed to evade arrest, such as Calixto Pérez Doñoro. In June 1942, Bayón was replaced by Jesús Carreras, sent by the PCE leadership in France, whose influence was increasingly felt in the organization in the interior through the work of Jesús Monzón and his deputy Gabriel León Trilla who had rebuilt the PCE in the French Midi, then under the collaborationist regime of Vichy, and whose press organ, published clandestinely from August 1941, carried the title of La Reconquista de España (The Reconquest of Spain). Nevertheless, in February 1943, Carreras, betrayed by a police informer, was arrested in Madrid and tortured, and after him the rest of the national leadership in Madrid, including Bayón and Pérez Doñoro, and an important number of active communist militants, as well as the top brass of the JSU. For the second time in less than two years the PCE saw its internal organization dismantled.

The socialists took much longer to reorganize than the anarchists and communists. The first nucleus to be reconstituted was that of the Basque Country as a result of the clandestine work of Nicolás Redondo Blanco and Ramón Rubial. In Asturias, where repression was stronger due to the greater presence of the Guardia Civil and the Army fighting the maquis, the first provincial committee was not formed until 1944. In Madrid a third socialist nucleus was formed under the impulse of Sócrates Gómez.

=== Republican opposition in exile ===
Diego Martínez Barrio managed to gather a good part of the left-wing republicans in exile —Unión Republicana, Izquierda Republicana, and Partido Republicano Federal— with the creation in Mexico of the Acción Republicana Española, whose first manifesto was made public on April 14, 1941, the tenth anniversary of the proclamation of the Second Spanish Republic, in which he ended by calling on the Western democracies to help overthrow Franco because "without a free Spain a free Europe will not be possible". The fundamental point on which the proposal of the ARE diverged from that of the socialist Indalecio Prieto, who had displaced the "Negrinista" sector from the leadership of the PSOE and the UGT, was that it advocated the reconstruction of a republican government that would present itself to the allies as an alternative to Franco, while the latter advocated the holding of a referendum on the form of government to attract the support of the monarchists.

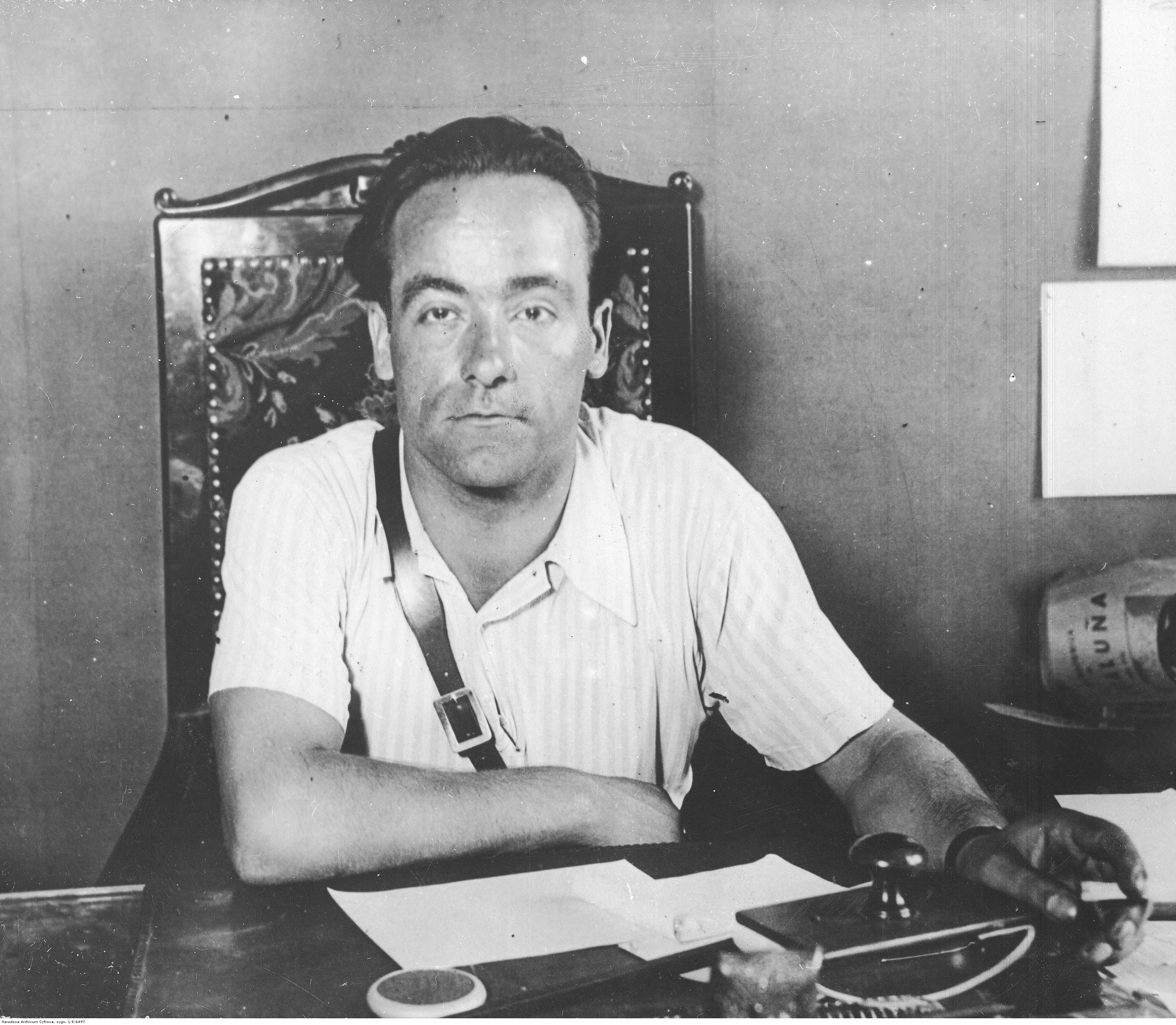
Juan García Oliver, leader of the "collaborationist" sector of the Libertarian Movement, when he was Minister of Justice in Largo Caballero's government during the Spanish Civil War.

The anarchists also carried out their own unification process initiated before the end of the war with the creation in France on February 26, 1939, of the Libertarian Movement, made up of the CNT, the FAI and the FIJL. But in the spring of 1942 the Libertarian Movement in exile experienced a serious crisis with the outbreak of latent tensions since the end of the war between the "collaborationists" led by Juan García Oliver and Aurelio Fernández, and the "apolitical" who supported the Paris-based national council presided over by Germinal Esgleas and Federica Montseny. At a meeting held in Mexico the former presented a document for discussion entitled "Ponencia" but were defeated, so they decided to form their own organization, a new CNT, which had as its press organ the CNT newspaper, while the spokesman of the "anti-collaborationists" was Solidaridad Obrera.

The Communists since the signature of the German-Soviet pact in August 1939 remained isolated from the rest of the Republican opposition forces by defending a policy based on the consideration of World War II as an "imperialist war" in which the Spanish people should not intervene. Only after the invasion of the Soviet Union in June 1941 they began to break their isolation by defending now that the world war was a war of aggression by the Nazis to "liquidate, one by one, all the free countries", among which the communists included the Soviet Union, "to achieve their yearning for hegemony in the world", as was explained in an article published in Nuestra Bandera with the significant title of "Let us make of all Spain a great front against Franco and against Hitler". Consequently, on August 1, 1941, the PCE proposed the formation of a "National Union of all Spaniards against Franco, the Italo-German invaders and the traitors" which would unite all Spaniards without distinction, so that the call was also addressed to the monarchist military and to all conservative elements who wanted to distance themselves from Franco's policies.

The first outcome of this new doctrine was the Spanish Democratic Union (UDE), formed in Mexico in February 1942 and made up of the PCE and the "negrinista" sectors of the PSOE and the UGT, the Republican Left (IR), the Republican Union (UR), the Federal Republican Party (PRF) and the Unió de Rabassaires —on the other hand, the Catalan communists of the PSUC formed in May their own UDE under the name of Aliança Nacional de Catalunya (ANC)—. Yet in September 1942 the PCE took a new turn in its policy by making public a manifesto in which neither the government of Juan Negrín nor the 1931 Constitution was mentioned and instead it proposed the holding of "democratic elections" to constitute a "constituent assembly to draft the constitutional charter that would guarantee the freedom, independence and prosperity of Spain". According to Hartmut Heine, this new turn was a response to Stalin's policy of considering the Iberian Peninsula "as an indisputable part of the sphere of influence of the West or, rather, of England". Juan Negrin responded by parting with the communists, as did the republican refugees in Great Britain. Thus in February 1943 the UDE was dissolved. However, the Socialists and the "negrinista" Republicans, unlike Negrin himself, did not completely sever their ties with the PCE.

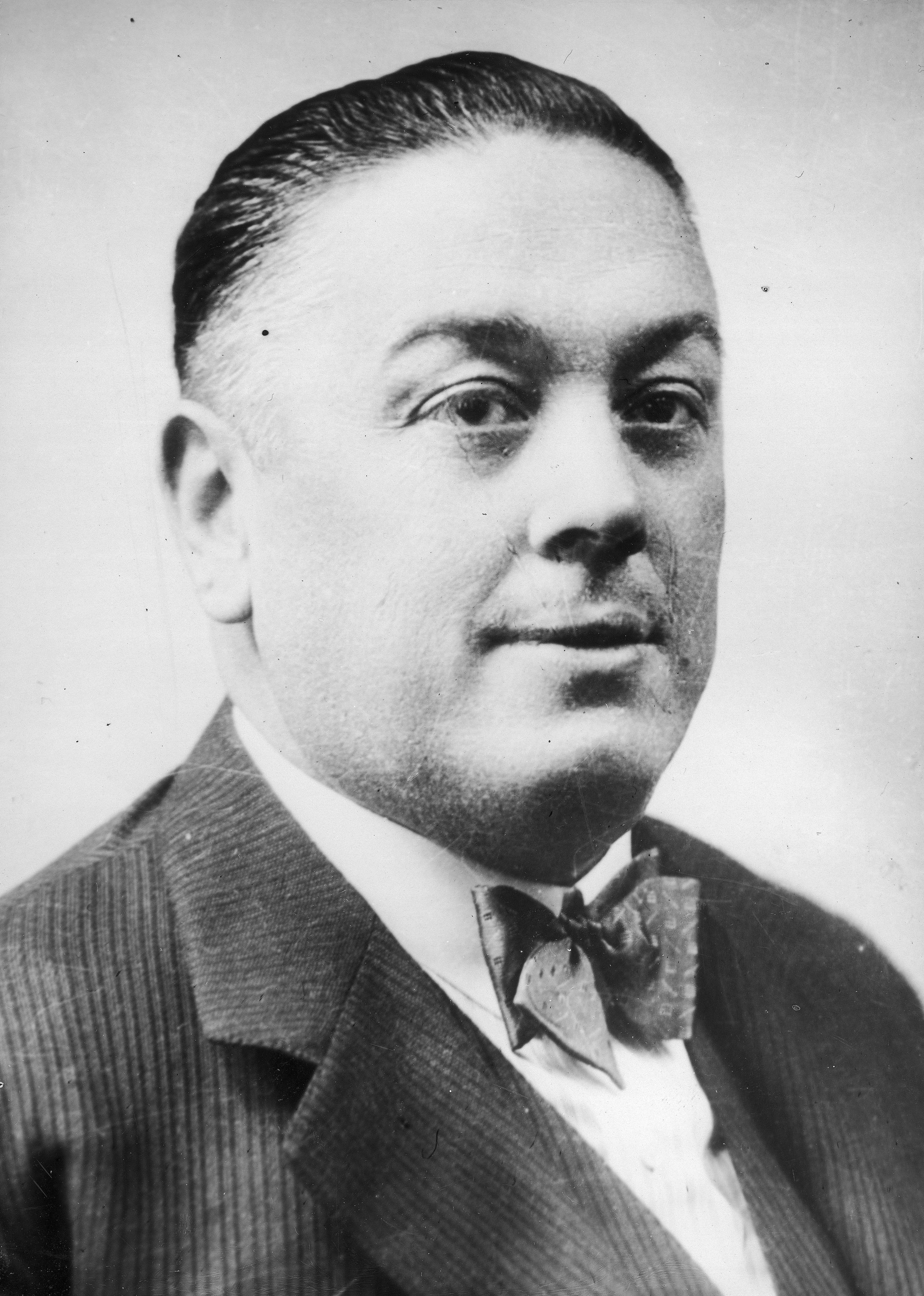
Diego Martínez Barrio, president of the Republican Courts in exile and founder of Acción Republicana Española.

On the initiative of Diego Martínez Barrio, on November 20, 1943, the Junta Española de Liberación was presented in Mexico, made up of the "prietista" socialists and the republicans of the ARE, which constituted "the first relatively broad alliance of the republican forces in exile" since the end of the civil war. However, the JEL did not bring together all the anti-Francoist forces in exile, since the PCE and the "Negrinista" socialists and republicans had been left out of it.

For its part, the PCE promoted the Unión Nacional Española, which sought to bring together all anti-Francoist forces, both republican and monarchist. The liberation of France in the summer of 1944 led the UNE to consider that the time had come to launch the invasion of Spain once the Germans had abandoned the border posts and had been replaced by members of the Gendarmerie Nationale. The operation devised by Jesús Monzón and his political and military advisors consisted of a frontal attack on the border defenses of the Pyrenees to establish several bridgeheads of "liberated Spain", which was to provoke a popular insurrection throughout the country. It was codenamed Operation Reconquista de España and was to involve some 9,000 Spanish members of the French maquis, integrated since May 1944 in the Spanish Guerrilla Grouping (AGE).

The operation began between October 3 and 7 with the invasion of the Roncal Valley, followed a week later by the incursion into the sector between Hendaye and Saint Jean-Pied-de-Port, in the Basque Country, but in both cases the guerrillas encountered strong resistance and ended up retreating a few days later. On October 17 the main attack began in the Aran Valley by a force of 3,000 to 4,000 guerrillas under the command of Vicente Lopez Tovar, but they also had to retreat, and only a small number managed to save the siege and integrate into the maquis groups operating in the interior of Spain.

The political bureau of the PCE held Jesús Monzón responsible for the disaster and ordered the end of the UNE, although it was not officially dissolved until June 25, 1945. Monzon, fearing for his life, disobeyed the peremptory order to return to France and wandered around the interior of Spain until he was arrested and sentenced to thirty years in prison. His closest collaborator, Gabriel León Trilla, was assassinated in Madrid on September 6, 1945, by communist agents carrying out orders from the PCE leadership. The same fate befell two other "Monzonist" cadres: Alberto Pérez Ayala was assassinated in Madrid on October 15, 1945; Pere Canals as soon as he crossed the French border.

That same month of October 1944 the agreement reached between libertarians, anarchists and republicans of the interior was made public, which created the National Alliance of Democratic Forces (ANFD) whose objective was the formation of a provisional government that would reestablish democratic liberties and call general elections, for which it was willing to make a pact with the monarchist forces without putting as a condition the restoration of the Republic. Thus, during the last months of 1944, the three members of the ANFD national committee maintained contacts with the monarchist generals Aranda, Kindelán, Saliquet and Alfonso de Orleáns y Borbón, all of them convinced that Franco's regime would not survive the defeat of the Axis powers. However, the discussions soon reached a dead end as the generals wanted the forces represented in the ANFD to accept the restoration of the monarchy without forming a provisional government and without a referendum on the form of government. The final failure of these attempts was due above all to the wave of arrests carried out by Franco's police at the end of 1944 and the beginning of 1945, which led to the imprisonment of the leaders of the ANFD, the national committee of the Libertarian Movement and the executive of the PSOE, as well as prominent monarchist politicians who had maintained contacts with them.

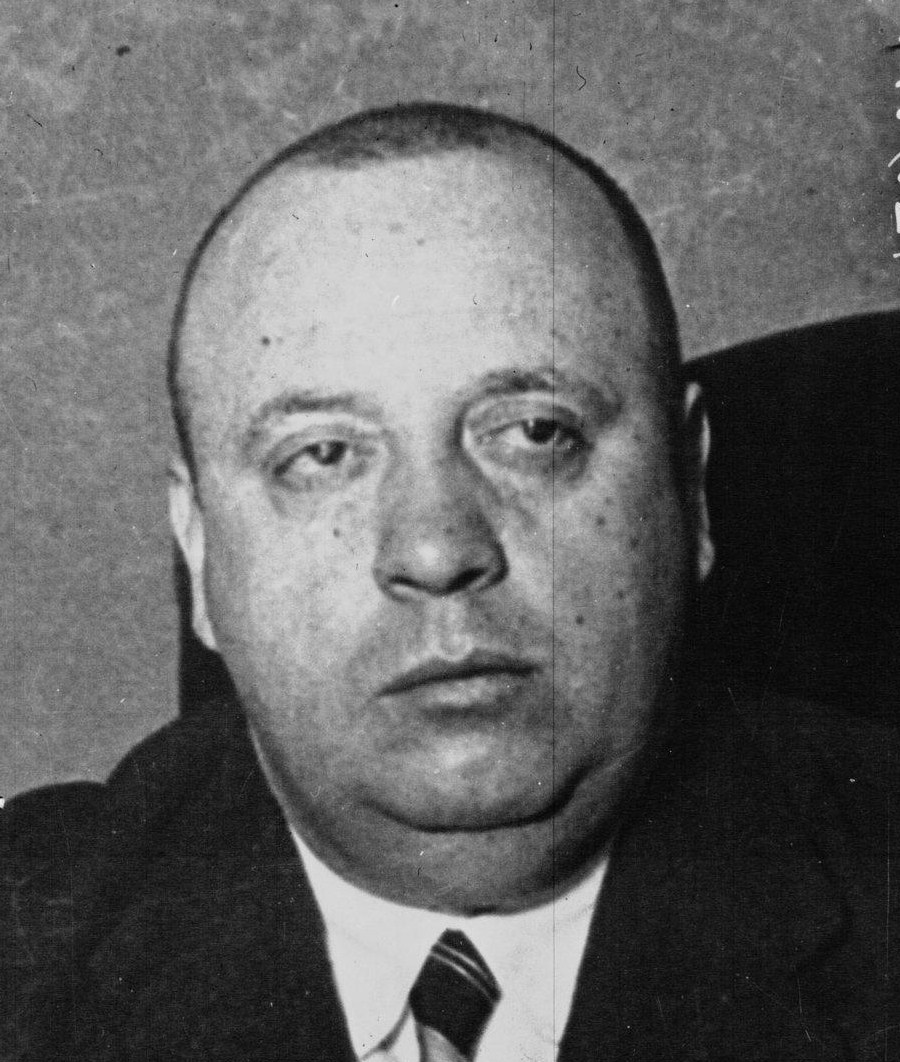
Indalecio Prieto, who managed to prevent the Republican Courts from approving the formation of a National Council of the Republic, which would act as a government in exile.

The month after the founding of the ANFD, Martinez Barrio announced in Mexico the convocation of a meeting of the Republican Courts, the first since the end of the civil war, for January 10, 1945, with the objective of creating a National Council of the Spanish Republic. Seventy-two of the 205 living in exile attended (104 resided in Spain, and 88 had died in the war, 60 executed by the rebel side and 28 by the Republican side). The "prietista" socialists argued that there was not enough quorum to validate the meeting —they refused to count the 49 deputies who had not been able to attend but who had joined in writing— so the creation of the National Council of the Spanish Republic could not be approved and the next scheduled meeting was postponed sine die.

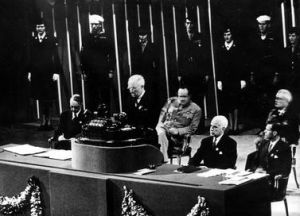
U.S. President Harry Truman addressing the participants in the San Francisco Conference, from which the Franco regime was excluded, and which was attended by prominent Republican politicians as guests.

Thus, when the Yalta Conference was held, between February 4 and 11, 1945, there was no such thing as a provisional republican government. There, the big three (Soviet Union, United States and Great Britain) agreed "that all liberated countries and those which acted in the orbit of Nazism should freely elect their governments by means of free elections", which was a direct threat to the Franco regime. After learning of the agreement, the Spanish Liberation Junta made public on February 14 a manifesto in which it requested that the Allies "remove the obstacle of Franco's dictatorship ", so that Spain could join the United Nations. In fact, on March 10, 1945, President Roosevelt informed his ambassador in Madrid Norman Armour that "our victory over Germany will entail the extermination of Nazism and related ideologies" and therefore "there is no place in the United Nations for a government founded on the principles of fascism". Armour immediately informed the Spanish Foreign Minister of the contents of Roosevelt's letter.

Thus the Franco regime was excluded from the San Francisco conference that would lead to the creation of the UN, and to which Republicans in exile were invited as political observers. On June 19, the Conference approved a resolution proposed by the Mexican delegate, and with the support of the French and American delegates, which condemned all regimes that had arisen with the support of Nazi Germany and Fascist Italy, a direct reference to the Franco dictatorship.

=== Monarchist opposition ===
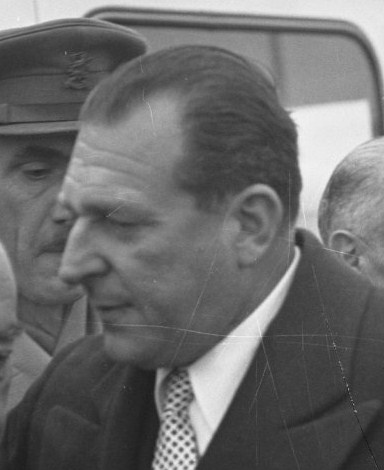
Juan de Borbón, pretender to the Spanish throne.

After overcoming the crisis of May 1941, the monarchist military began to pressure Franco to give way to the monarchy. In July of that same year they formed a junta made up of five generals presided over by General Luis Orgaz, Spanish High Commissioner in Morocco, although the mastermind was General Aranda. However, among the conspirators, who had been joined by prominent monarchist politicians such as Pedro Sainz Rodríguez, there were numerous discrepancies both on the composition of the hypothetical provisional government that would be formed after Franco's abandonment of power —with a predominance of military men, as General Aranda defended, or of civilians as Sainz Rodríguez advocated— and on its objectives —Aranda was content with dissolving the Falange and Sainz Rodríguez defended the immediate restoration of the monarchy—.

In the meeting held on November 22, several of the conspirators abandoned the idea of forming a provisional government or junta to support instead the constitution of a regency council to ensure the restoration of the monarchy. As this meant overthrowing Franco, several generals withdrew and, on the other hand, the British government, on whose support they had counted until then, did not want to commit itself either. Thus the conspiracy lost strength.

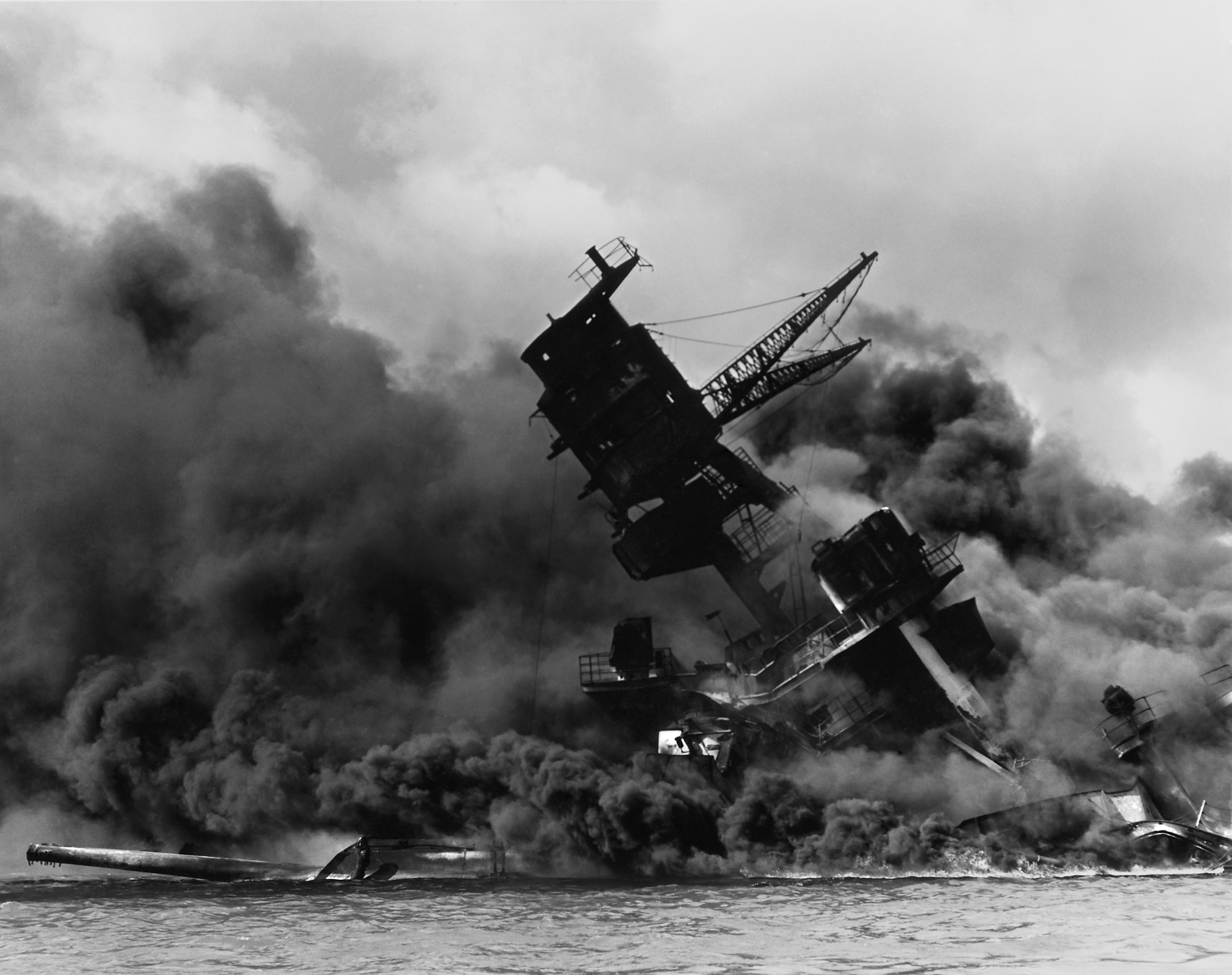
The USS Arizona during the attack on Pearl Harbor.

In December 1941, after the German failure in the capture of Moscow and the entry of the United States into the war due to the Japanese attack on Pearl Harbor —which was congratulated by the Spanish government through a telegram to Tokyo—, the royalist generals again put pressure on Generalissimo Franco at the meeting of the Army Council held on the 15th. And on January 26, 1942, General Kindelán delivered a speech at the Captaincy General of Barcelona in which he asked the Caudillo for the restoration of the monarchy as the only means to achieve the necessary "conciliation and solidarity among the Spanish people". Franco, who was furious, did not react immediately and preferred to wait. In June 1942 he began to move and forced Sainz Rodriguez and Eugenio Vegas Latapié, the two civilian ringleaders of the conspiracy, to leave the country.

On November 11, 1942, only two days after the beginning of the Allied landings in Morocco and Algeria, Juan de Borbón, legitimate heir to the Spanish Crown after the abdication and death of his father King Alfonso XIII, expressed for the first time publicly his aspiration to occupy the throne and began to distance himself from the Franco regime, which until then he had supported. He made a statement to the Swiss newspaper Journal de Genève, which became known as the Geneva Manifesto. "The ideological affinities with Acción Española were left behind and he presented himself as a man who longed to be the king of all Spaniards and not just of one side, and who considered his main mission to achieve the reconciliation of the nation, eliminating the causes that kept it divided".

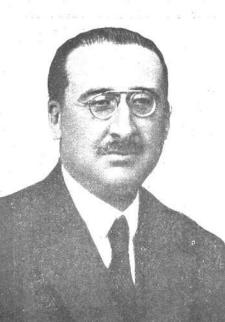
Manuel González Hontoria, member of the monarchist committee that was formed in March 1943 to promote the cause of Don Juan de Borbón.

The same day that the "Geneva manifesto" appeared, General Kindelán met with Franco in Madrid to ask him in his name and in the name of the rest of the monarchist generals (Gómez Jordana, Dávila, Aranda, Orgaz, Vigón and Varela) to proclaim the monarchy and declare himself regent. "Franco gritted his teeth and responded in a conciliatory and sly tone. He denied any formal commitment to the Axis, stated that he did not wish to remain any longer than necessary in a position that he found more unpleasant every day and confessed that he wanted Don Juan to be his successor". Two months later, he removed General Kindelán from his post as head of the Captaincy General of Catalonia, appointing him director of the Army College, which had no direct command over troops. He was replaced by the Falangist General Moscardó.

The spring of 1943 saw the first sign of the semi-clandestine campaign that was developed in favor of Don Juan. Leaflets appeared in Madrid, imitating postcards, in which a photo and the biography of the pretender appeared, together with a fragment of one of his speeches. Around the same time a monarchist committee was formed, made up of Alfonso García Valdecasas, Germiniano Carrascal, Joan Ventosa i Calvell, Manuel González Hontoria and José María Oriol, representing the sector of the Traditionalist Communion headed by the Count of Rodezno.

On June 15, 1943, 27 procurators of the pro-Franco Cortes addressed a letter to Franco in which, in a flattering —"almost servile"— tone, they encouraged him to "crown his mission" by restoring the Monarchy. The Caudillo's response was to remove them all from their official posts and to order the arrest of the promoter of the letter, the Marquis of Eliseda. Another of the promoters —also considered as the material author of the letter— Francisco Moreno Zulueta, Count of the Andes, was banished to the island of La Palma.

The fall of Mussolini on July 25, 1943, and the armistice between Italy and the allied armed forces on September 3 gave a new impulse to the royalist cause. On August 2, Don Juan sent a telegram to General Franco urging him to abandon power and to give way to the Monarchy "because there is no time to lose", the events in Italy "can serve as a warning". General Franco immediately replied with another telegram that ended with a veiled threat:

The seriousness of your telegram advises, in the service of the Fatherland, maximum discretion in the prince, avoiding any act or manifestation that could tend to undermine the prestige and authority of the Spanish Regime before the exterior, and the unity of the Spaniards in the interior, which would result in serious damage to the Monarchy and especially to your highness.

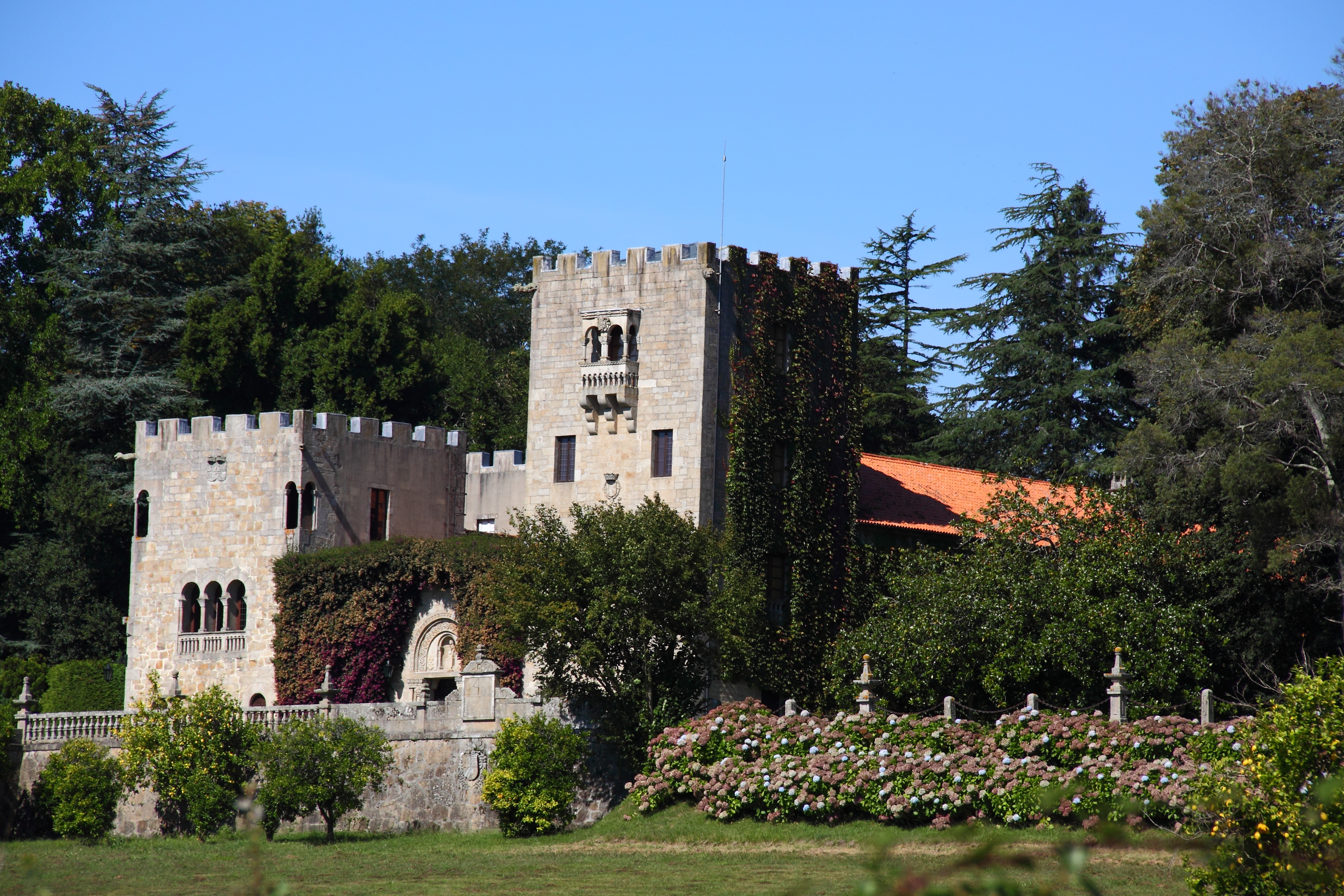
Pazo de Meirás, Franco's summer residence.

The most critical moment for General Franco occurred on September 8, 1943, when he received a letter signed by eight of the twelve lieutenant generals —Luis Orgaz, Fidel Dávila, José Enrique Varela, José Solchaga, Alfredo Kindelán, Andrés Saliquet, Miguel Ponte, José Monasterio— in which they asked him in an attentive tone —the letter was signed by "some old comrades in arms and respectful subordinates"— to consider the restoration of the monarchy —it would be the only time in 39 years that the majority of the generals asked Franco to resign—. It was delivered by General Asensio although the initial idea had been that the request would be presented in person by General Luis Orgaz the previous month during a visit to the pazo de Meirás. But Franco did not make the slightest concession and limited himself to wait and to place in key positions military men loyal to him. When he spoke with the lieutenant generals one by one, only Kindelán, Orgaz and Ponte remained firm in their position, while the others hesitated, and General Saliquet even told him that he had been pressured to sign. "By mid-October 1943 the storm had passed."

In March 1944, a large group of university professors and lecturers wrote to the "king" Juan de Borbón: "In the Monarchy and in the person of Your Majesty is our hope for a stable Regime". Franco's response was to order the exile of four of the signatories, professors at the University of Madrid: Julio Palacios, Alfonso García Valdecasas, Jesús Pabón and Juan José López Ibor.

Finally, after almost a year without having made any declaration, on March 19, 1945, Don Juan made public the Manifesto of Lausanne in which he broke with Francoism. In it he stated that the Francoist regime "is fundamentally incompatible with the present circumstances being created in the world", that is to say, with the Allied victory, for which reason he asked Franco to make way for the "traditional Monarchy" since only it "can be an instrument of peace and harmony to reconcile the Spanish people".

The manifesto was silenced by the Spanish press and radio, although it was broadcast by the BBC. On March 25, Don Juan asked his supporters to resign from their posts, but only two of them did so: the Duke of Alba, who resigned from the embassy in London and who commented that Franco "only wants to support himself in perpetuity; he is infatuated and arrogant. He knows everything and trusts the international game recklessly"; and General Alfonso de Orleáns y Borbón, Duke of Seville, who resigned from his post as inspector of the air forces. General Franco's reaction was immediate. He banished General de Orleáns to the estate he owned in Cádiz and sent two emissaries, the Catholics Alberto Martín Artajo and Joaquín Ruiz Giménez, to communicate to Don Juan the total support of the Army, the Church, the single party FET y de las JONS and the majority of the monarchists for the Franco regime. On March 20 he summoned the Superior Council of the Army which met for three days and there he rejected Kindelán's request for the restoration of the monarchy — "As long as I live I will never be a queen mother", he told him—.

== Opposition to Franco's regime from 1945 to 1950 ==
=== Opposition from the interior: the "maquis". ===
Areas where the maquis acted.

The declarations of condemnation of the Franco regime by the Allies —at the Potsdam Conference the big three (Stalin, Truman and Churchill —substituted by Attlee—) agreed not to support "any application for membership in the UN of the present Spanish Government, which, having been established with the support of the Axis powers, does not possess, by reason of its origins, its nature, its record and its close association with the aggressor countries, the qualities necessary to justify such membership"— aroused enormous expectations among the Republican opposition in exile and in the interior, which resulted among other things in an increase in the activity of the "maquis".

To deal with guerrilla activity, the regime established controls over the movements of the population and in April 1947 the Law of Banditry and Terrorism was promulgated, the preamble of which stated that it intended to use "special measures of repression" to combat "the most serious criminal species of any post-war situation, a consequence of the relaxation of moral ties and the exaltation of the impulses of cruelty and the aggressiveness of criminal and maladjusted people". The articles established the assumptions in which the death penalty would be applied to "evildoers" —or "bandits"—, which not only included having killed someone, but also having wielded "a weapon of war" or having detained "travelers in unpopulated areas".

Both the guerrillas and the Army and Civil Guard units that fought them resorted to reprisals, "often reaching a terrified civilian population". "A captured guerrilla had little chance of staying alive" but neither did "a village mayor, or a notorious Francoist imprisoned in a guerrilla raid". On the other hand, the Franco regime used guerrilla activity as "proof" that the civil war was continuing. Thus, in a report of October 1946 Luis Carrero Blanco, the Generalissimo's right-hand man, recommended to Franco the use of "all the levers that the Government and the Movement have in their hands on the basis that it is moral and lawful to impose terror when it is based on justice and cuts off a greater evil (...) The direct action of punishment, without reaching serious outpourings of blood, is advisable against naive agitators who, without being agents of communism, play into its hands".

=== Republican opposition in exile ===
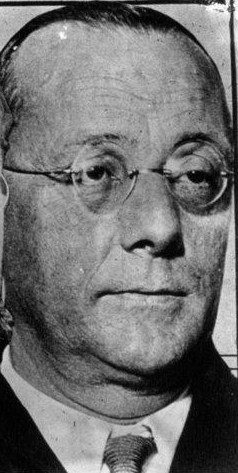
José Giral, president of the Government of the Republic in exile

While the activity of the maquis was increasing, in August 1945 a special session of the Republican Courts was held in Mexico in which Diego Martínez Barrio was elected president of the Second Spanish Republic in exile and a government presided by José Giral was appointed, from which in principle the negrinists and the communists were excluded. However, the Republican government was not recognized by any of the victorious powers or by the UN —only by the Eastern European countries under the Soviet orbit and by Mexico, Venezuela, Panama and Guatemala—, so José Giral would end up presenting his resignation in February 1947 —two months after the declaration condemning Francoism by the UN in December 1946 made no mention of the Republican government in exile—. Another reason for his resignation was that Giral was opposed to the talks that the Socialist Indalecio Prieto was holding with José María Gil Robles on behalf of the monarchists.

For this last reason the republican opposition was divided between those in favor of allying with the monarchists and accepting a referendum on the form of state, and those who continued to defend republican legitimacy. Another reason for confrontation was the strategy to be followed: whether to continue with the guerrilla struggle as a preliminary phase to the popular insurrection (as the CNT, the PSOE and the PCE were practicing), or, on the contrary, to give priority to the diplomatic struggle to force international action by the great powers and the UN (as the Basque and Catalan nationalists and the Republican parties were advocating).

=== Monarchist opposition ===
The monarchists also intensified their offensive after the Manifesto of Lausanne made public by Don Juan de Borbón on March 19, 1945. However, the break with the Franco regime was not total, since in August Eugenio Vegas Latapié, representing Don Juan, traveled incognito to Madrid where he met with Luis Carrero Blanco, the Caudillo's right-hand man, although no agreement was reached. The problem for Don Juan was that he did not have an organized and united monarchist opposition within Spain and that the Army firmly supported Franco as did the "collaborationist" monarchists. Nevertheless, monarchist pressure increased when in February 1946 Don Juan moved his official residence from Lausanne to Estoril (near Lisbon) and received a letter of welcome signed by 458 members of the Spanish elite, including two former ministers, which caused Franco deep concern and he said: "it is a declaration of war". After that, he ended up breaking off relations with Don Juan. On the other hand, the small sector of Carlism headed by the Count of Rodezno recognized Don Juan as its sovereign.

In March 1947 the Law of Succession to the Headship of the State (the fifth "fundamental law" of Franco's regime) was published, whose second article granted the "Head of State" for life to the "Caudillo of Spain and of the Crusade, Generalissimo of the Armies" and Article 6 conferred on Franco the right to designate a successor "as King or Regent" "at any time" and with full capacity to revoke his decision, so that the Monarchy would not be restored but installed in the person of the royalty that General Franco would decide, thus turning his successor "into a puppet of the dictator and his political heirs".

Estoril Beach (Portugal).

The content of the Law of Succession was known to Don Juan de Borbón before the project was made public through the interview he had with Franco's envoy, Luis Carrero Blanco. As no mention was made of any dynastic right of succession, Don Juan's response was not long in coming in the form of a new declaration —the Estoril Manifesto of April 7, 1947— in which he rejected the Law and defended the hereditary rights of succession to the throne, which were vested in his person. This message was not made public in Spain, where the press launched a campaign against "the pretender". The Estoril Manifesto denounced that the law tried to "convert a "personal dictatorship" into a "lifetime" and to disguise "with the glorious mantle of the Monarchy a regime of pure governmental arbitrariness", and affirmed the "supreme principle of legitimacy" that fell on Don Juan and "the imprescriptible rights of sovereignty that the providence of God has willed to come to converge" in him. Don Juan then declared himself "to be ready to facilitate everything that would allow to assure the normal and unconditional transmission of powers".

To seek the "democratic" legitimacy of the regime, the law was first approved by the Parliament on June 7, and then submitted to referendum on July 6, 1947, producing a very high participation and the affirmative vote of 93% of the voters as a result of the official propaganda —the only one allowed— and other pressure measures —for example, the presentation and stamping of the ration stamp as a form of electoral identification—.

=== Defeat of the opposition ===
The outbreak of the "cold war" ended up favoring General Franco, as Spain had a new strategic value for the "free world" bloc in the face of a possible Soviet attack on Western Europe. In November 1947 the United States successfully opposed in the UN a new condemnation of the Franco regime and the imposition of new sanctions. Four months later, France reopened the border with Spain, and between May and June 1948 trade and financial agreements were signed with France and Great Britain. At the beginning of 1949, Franco's regime received the first credit granted by an American bank with the approval of his government for a value of 25 million dollars. Shortly before, the chairman of the U.S. Senate Armed Services Committee had visited Spain.

The process of "rehabilitating" Franco's dictatorship was formally completed in 1950, after the Korean War, the first major confrontation of the "cold war", broke out in June of that year. On November 4, the UN General Assembly revoked by a large majority —with American support and French and British abstention— the resolution condemning Franco's regime of December 1946. Thus, in the following months the Western ambassadors returned to Madrid and Spain's entry into the UN's specialized international organizations was approved.

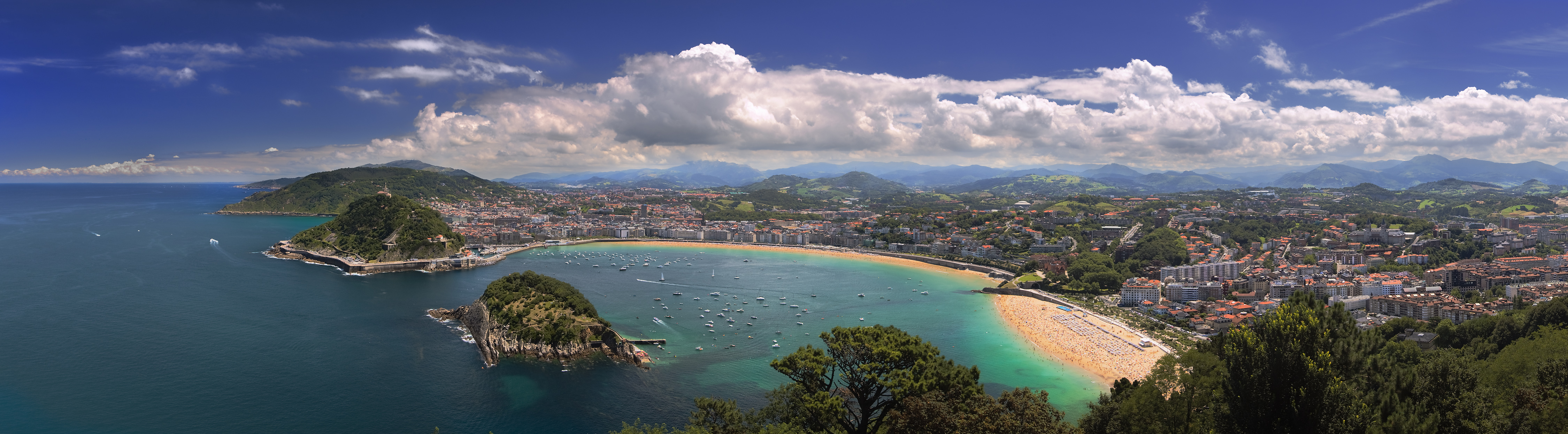
View of San Sebastian from Igeldo. The meeting between Franco and Don Juan took place offshore aboard the Azor.

The international rehabilitation of Franco's regime and the approval by referendum of the Law of Succession weakened the monarchist option to such an extent that Don Juan de Borbón changed his strategy with respect to Franco and on August 25, 1948, he met with the Generalissimo on his Azor anchored in the Bay of Biscay, Don Juan attending the meeting aboard the Saltillo ship. As a result, it was agreed that Don Juan's son, Juan Carlos de Borbón, would be educated in Spain under the tutelage of General Franco. On November 7, the 10-year-old prince arrived in Spain. The interview had been promoted by collaborationist monarchists, such as the Duke of Sotomayor and Julio Danvila, and the general was accompanied by the Infante Jaime de Borbón, Don Juan's older brother, "perhaps as a reminder that there were changes in the struggle for the restoration of the Monarchy".

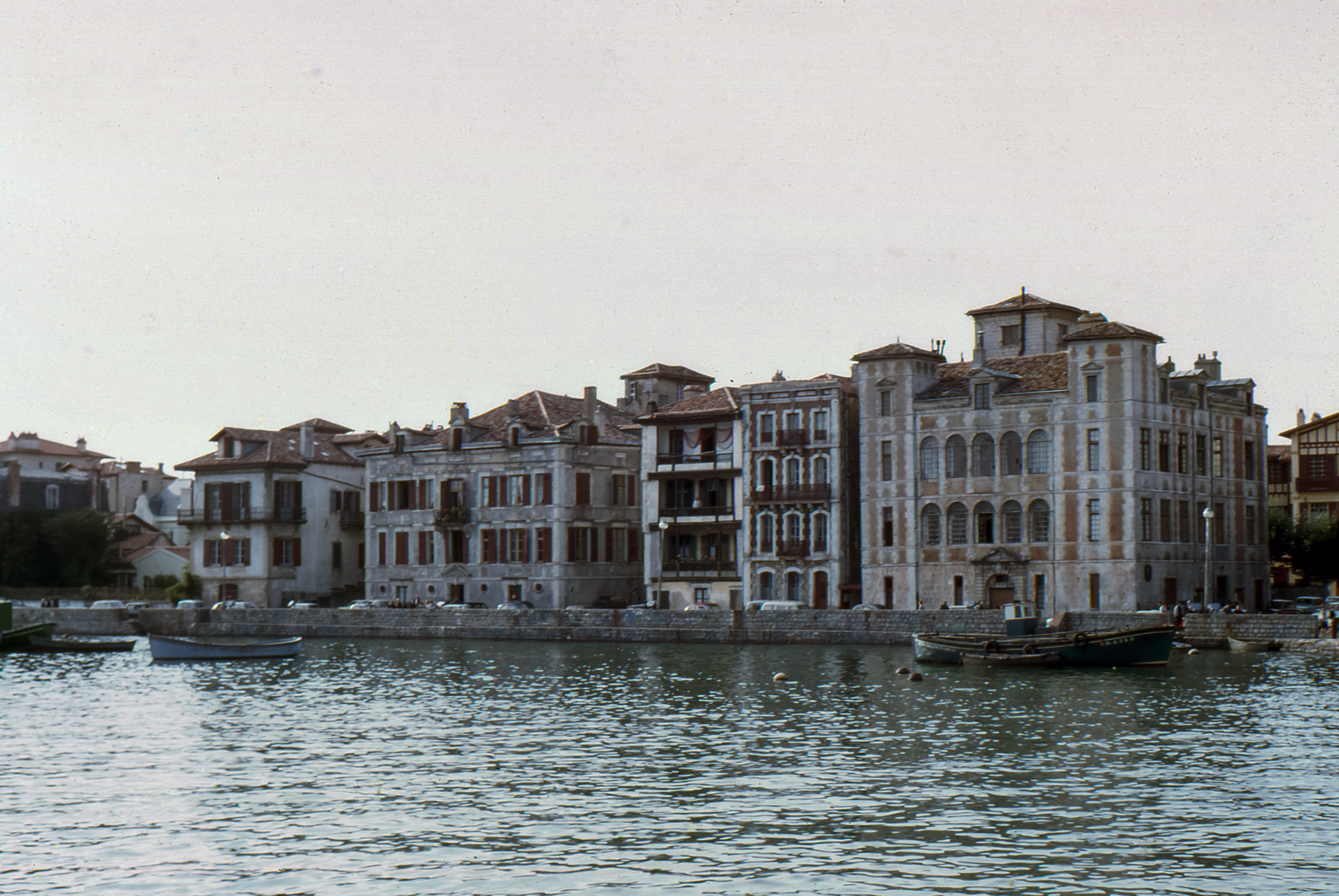
Saint-Jean-de-Luz (in 1965), where the pact between the socialists and the monarchists was signed, which was left without effect due to the agreement reached between Don Juan de Borbón and Franco in their interview on board the Azor yacht.

The agreement reached between Franco and Don Juan, which implicitly recognized the legitimacy of the Franco regime, left without effect the pact formalized in Saint-Jean-de-Luz three days later between José María Gil Robles, representing the non-collaborationist Juanistas monarchists of the Confederation of Monarchist Forces, and Indalecio Prieto, in representation of the monarchists, and Indalecio Prieto, representing part of the Republican opposition, in which they had agreed to fight jointly to overthrow Franco's dictatorship, after a provisional government would be formed which would call a plebiscite to decide the "definitive political regime", republican or monarchist. The discussions had begun under the auspices of the British Labor government, specifically Ernest Bevin, Foreign Office Secretary, who had brought together Gil Robles and Prieto in London on October 17, 1946, to promote the transition to democracy in Spain. Shortly after the fiasco of the Saint-Jean-de-Luz agreement, Indalecio Prieto resigned as president of the PSOE. He stated: "My failure is complete", and was replaced by Rodolfo Llopis. In July 1951, Don Juan wrote a letter to Franco in which he rejected the collaboration of the monarchists with the socialists and in which he said: "Let us reach an agreement to prepare a stable regime". Franco ignored the proposal.

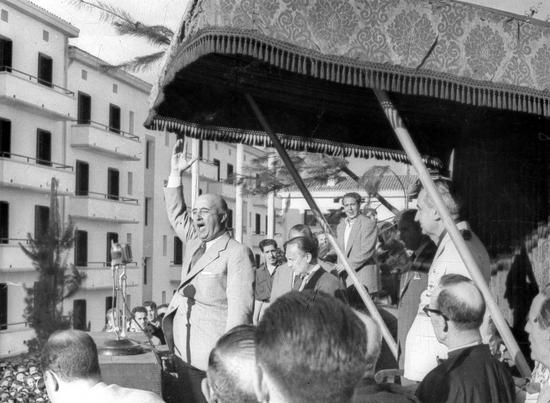
Franco giving a speech in Eibar in 1949. During the period of the regime's isolation, General Franco rarely appeared in military dress, unlike during the rest of his dictatorship.

For its part, the Republican opposition, faced with the international recognition of Franco's regime, ran out of arguments, and guerrilla activity declined. The communists abandoned the guerrillas completely in 1952, while the anarchists would still carry out sporadic actions until 1963.

From the end of 1948, Franco knew that no essential danger would question his "command", once the monarchist opposition had been "tamed" (with Prince Juan Carlos already in Spain), the guerrillas had been defeated, the Republican opposition in exile had been evicted and decapitated at home, and the international isolation of his regime had been broken. A symptom that the Franco regime already felt reassured was that on April 7, 1948, the state of war that had existed since the beginning of the civil war was ended, although the military courts would continue to deal with political crimes under the Banditry and Terrorism Law passed the previous year.

== 1950s ==
=== "Crossing the desert" ===
During the 1950s the internal and exile anti-Francoist opposition lived its "desert crossing". Attempts to rebuild the parties and workers' organizations in the underground were interrupted by the police, as happened to the CNT in 1953 when its National Committee in the interior, headed by Manuel Vallejo, was arrested; to the PSOE when that same year Tomás Centeno, president of the executive committee of the interior, was arrested and died during police interrogations; or to the PSUC, when its leader Joan Comorera was arrested in 1954 and sentenced by a court martial to thirty years in prison, dying in prison in 1958. That year the socialist Antonio Amat Guridi, Tomás Centeno's successor at the head of the PSOE's interior executive committee, was arrested and imprisoned.

However, in 1951 there was an important workers' protest as a result of the poor working conditions and the increase in prices. The epicenter was Barcelona and the trigger was the significant increase in the price of streetcar fares, which was responded on March 1 with a boycott by the population that lasted several days and that would end up achieving the annulment of the measure. The success of the boycott (a safe form of protest that did not involve personal risk) was followed by a fairly widespread strike in the industrial area of Barcelona against the rising cost of living. At first the reaction of the police was weak (the civil governor would be replaced as a result) and the captain general of Catalonia, the royalist Juan Bautista Sánchez refused to take the troops out on the streets, although during the following days measures of force were applied and the workers returned to their occupations. Protests and strikes also took place in other cities, such as Zaragoza, Bilbao, Pamplona and Madrid.

For his part, Don Juan de Borbón continued his rapprochement with Franco, meeting secretly with General Franco at an estate in Extremadura owned by the Count of Ruiseñada at the end of 1954.

=== Events of 1956 and emergence of a new anti-Franco opposition ===
On February 9, 1956, violent incidents took place at the University of Madrid as a result of a confrontation between students who were demonstrating in favor of free elections to the SEU and a group of Falangists who had just come from celebrating the annual ceremony of the "Day of the Fallen Student". In the brawl a Falangist student was seriously wounded by a bullet in the neck. The climate of crisis spread rapidly —there was rumour that the Falangists were preparing a Night of the Long Knives— and the police proceeded to arrest those responsible for calling the students' assembly who, to their surprise, turned out to be some of them former Falangists and sons of people of the regime.

The seriousness of the crisis —the first major internal crisis the Regime had to face since 1942— was made clear by two measures immediately taken by General Franco. On February 11 he decreed for the first time since its promulgation the suspension of Articles 14 and 18 of the Fuero de los Españoles, and the University of Madrid was closed. On February 16 he dismissed the two ministers who were "responsibles" for the events: Joaquín Ruiz Giménez, Minister of Education, and Fernández Cuesta, Minister-Secretary General of the Movement on whom the SEU depended.

The events of February 1956 showed that, after 15 years, the Francoist regime was losing control of the youth in the most important universities, where it had previously had limited support or, at least, no resistance, and constituted the first glimmer of a rebirth of internal opposition, which came not from the Republic, but from a new generation which had grown up under the Regime in the 1950s, and began to organize itself as opposition to the Francoist dictatorship regardless of the camp in which they themselves or their parents had militated during the civil war. Thus, "the events of 1956 marked a turning point in the development of anti-Francoism".

The communists were the first to grasp this new fact and before any other party they consecrated it as an official strategy. Thus, in the plenary session of the Central Committee of the PCE held in Prague in August 1956, which also supported the Soviet invasion of Hungary, the new policy of National Reconciliation was approved, which sought understanding with all the anti-Franco forces regardless of which side they had fought on in the Civil War. However, the task was not going to be easy, and both the "Day of National Reconciliation" of May 5, 1958, and the "National Peaceful Strike" of June 18, 1959, called by the PCE were a complete failure.

From 1958 onwards, strikes —which continued to be a crime— reappeared, especially in Asturias and Catalonia, centered on wage claims since inflation was causing the fall of real wages. In particular, the coal mining industry in Asturias was the scene of recurrent strikes which provided a new mechanism of workers' representation that was to be singularly successful in the future: the workers' commission elected from among the strikers, apart from the "union liaisons" and the "sworn company spokesmen" of the Francoist trade union organization, to present their claims directly to the management of their company or to the bosses. The intensity of the Asturian strike movement was such that it led Franco to decree on March 14, 1958, the second suspension of the Fuero de los Españoles and the state of emergency in the region for four months.

== 1960s ==
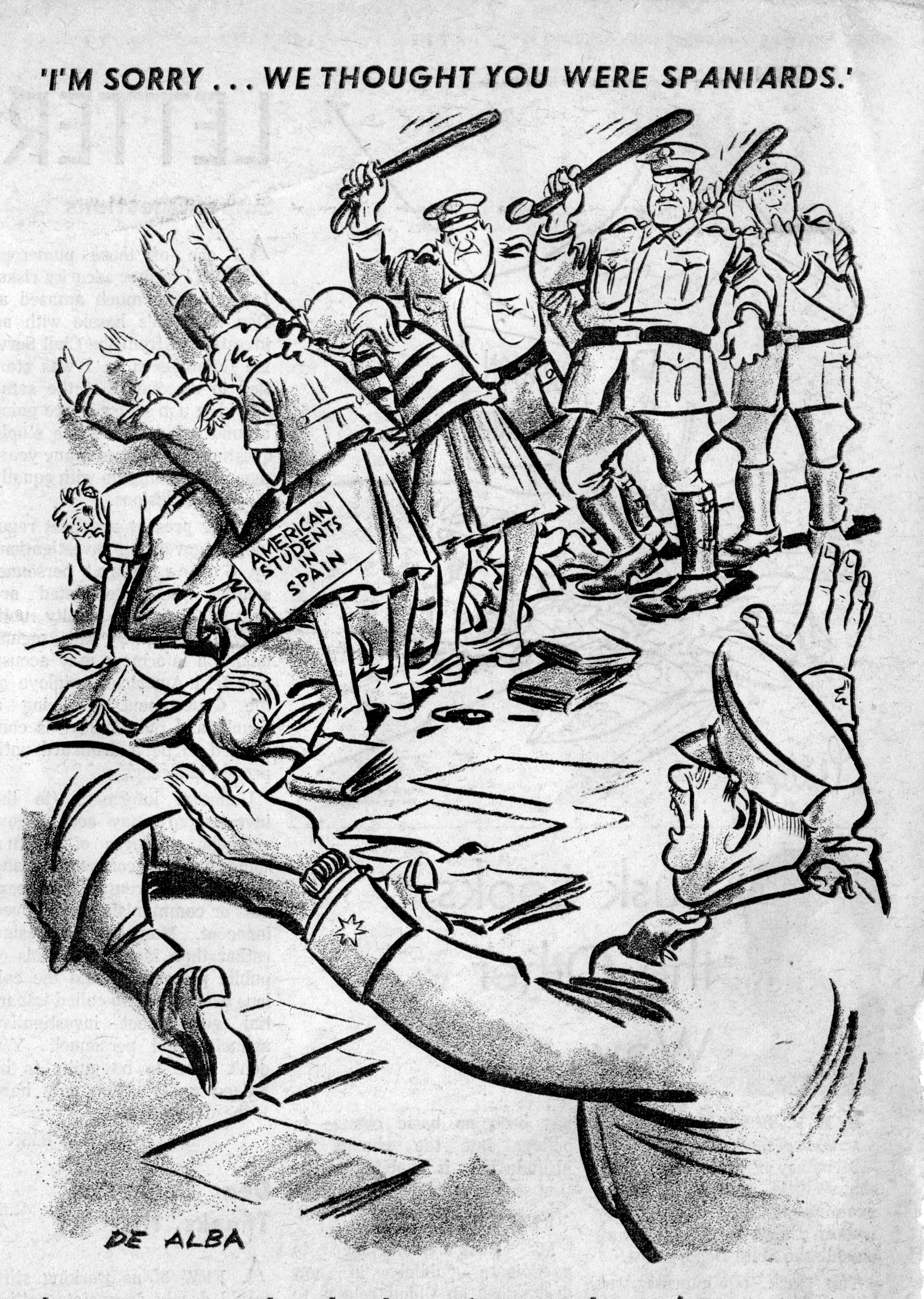
Caricature of De Alba appearing in The Washington Daily News. Police officer addresses a group of American students in Spain who have been beaten up by guards: "I'm sorry. We thought you were Spaniards."

The social changes brought about by the accelerated economic growth of the "prodigious decade" revived old conflicts and opened new ones, which progressively overflowed the channels established by the Franco regime, incapable of adapting to the new realities. In this context there was a resurgence of the opposition, which grew "both in number of militants and in mobilization capacity" although "it never represented a challenge, or rather an alternative, supported by the citizens as a whole, to the dictatorship".

=== Rebirth of the workers' movement ===
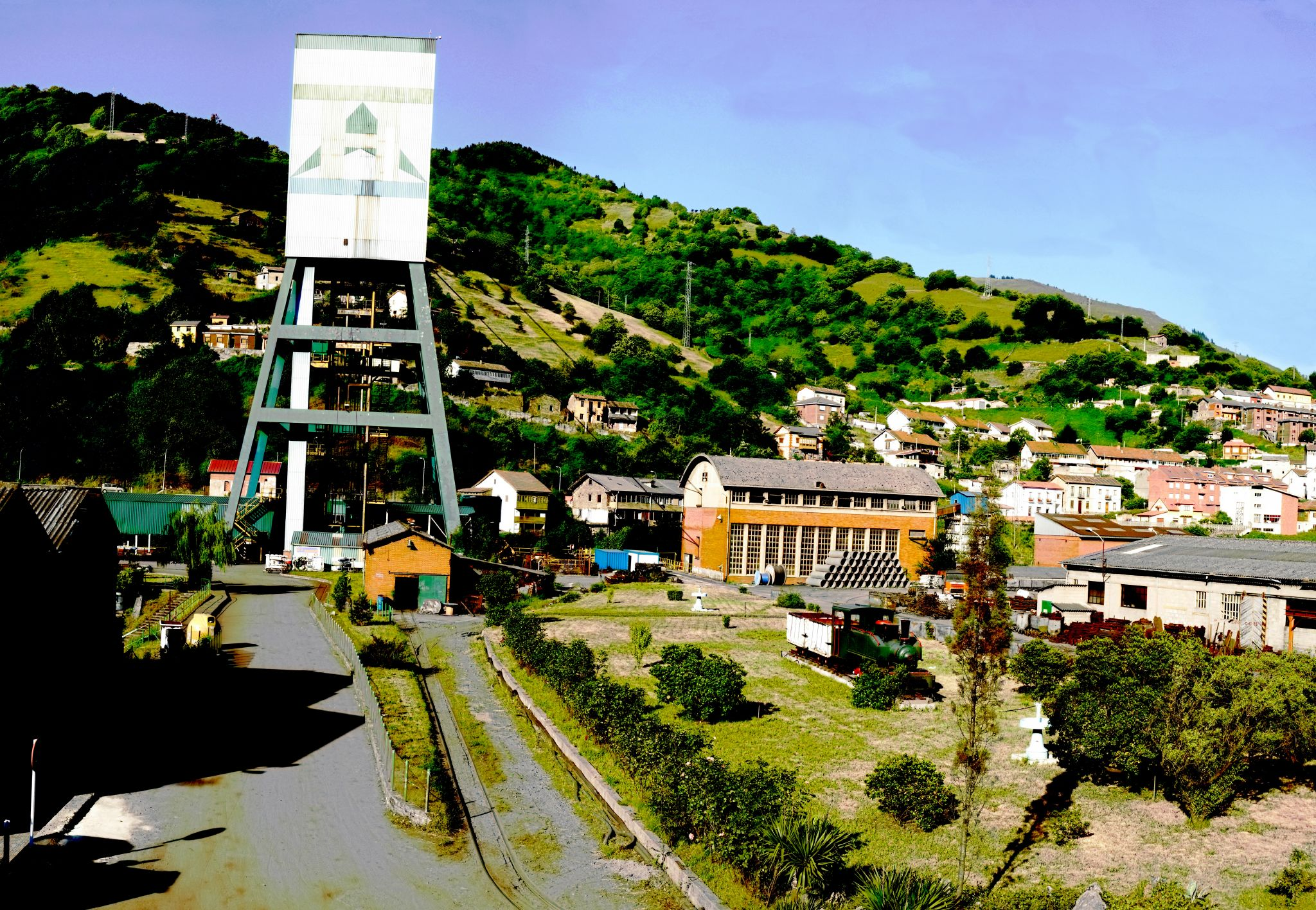
Santiago well in Aller (Asturias)

The first and most important challenge that the Francoist governments had to face was the return of the workers' conflict that started with the Asturias mining strike of 1962, producing from then on a progressive politicization due to the continuous police repression against their actions and the refusal of the authorities to legalize the rights to strike, demonstration and free trade union association, since the Francoist Trade Union Organization remained the only "union" allowed, with compulsory membership for all workers.

This new workers' movement was formed around the "workers' commissions" that arose spontaneously to negotiate directly with the employers the collective agreements outside the official Trade Union Organization, and that later came to form a whole political-union movement, which would take advantage of the official trade union elections of 1966 for "liaisons" and "sworn members" to spread and consolidate. The Franco regime ended up banning it the following year, considering it "a subsidiary of the Communist Party of Spain". The historical unions (UGT, CNT, ELA-STV) were only slowly reorganized throughout the decade.

=== Students movement ===
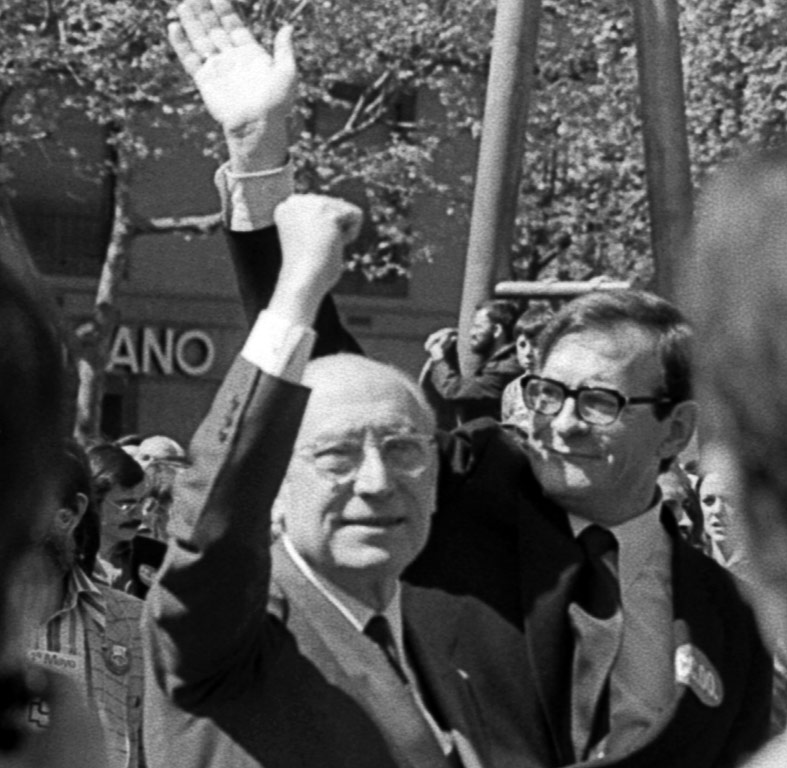
Professor Enrique Tierno Galván in 1979.

A second front that the regime had to deal with were the student protests at the university that spread throughout the decade, and were proof of the cultural and ideological failure of Francoism. "The regime's response to this ideological and cultural dissidence was a growing repression (sanctions, expulsions, arrests, torture, closures of faculties and universities...) that further alienated the university population with respect to Francoism." The university mobilizations of 1965 —which gained the support of some professors, such as José Luis López Aranguren, Enrique Tierno Galván and Agustín García Calvo, who were expelled from the University of Madrid for this reason— forced the dissolution of the SEU —that had already been affected since the events of 1956— and originated new free and openly anti-Francoist student groups —the most widespread in Madrid and Barcelona was the Sindicato Democrático de Estudiantes Universitarios (Democratic Union of University Students)—. The student events of 1969 would provoke the proclamation of a state of emergency throughout Spain for two months.

=== Catholic opposition ===
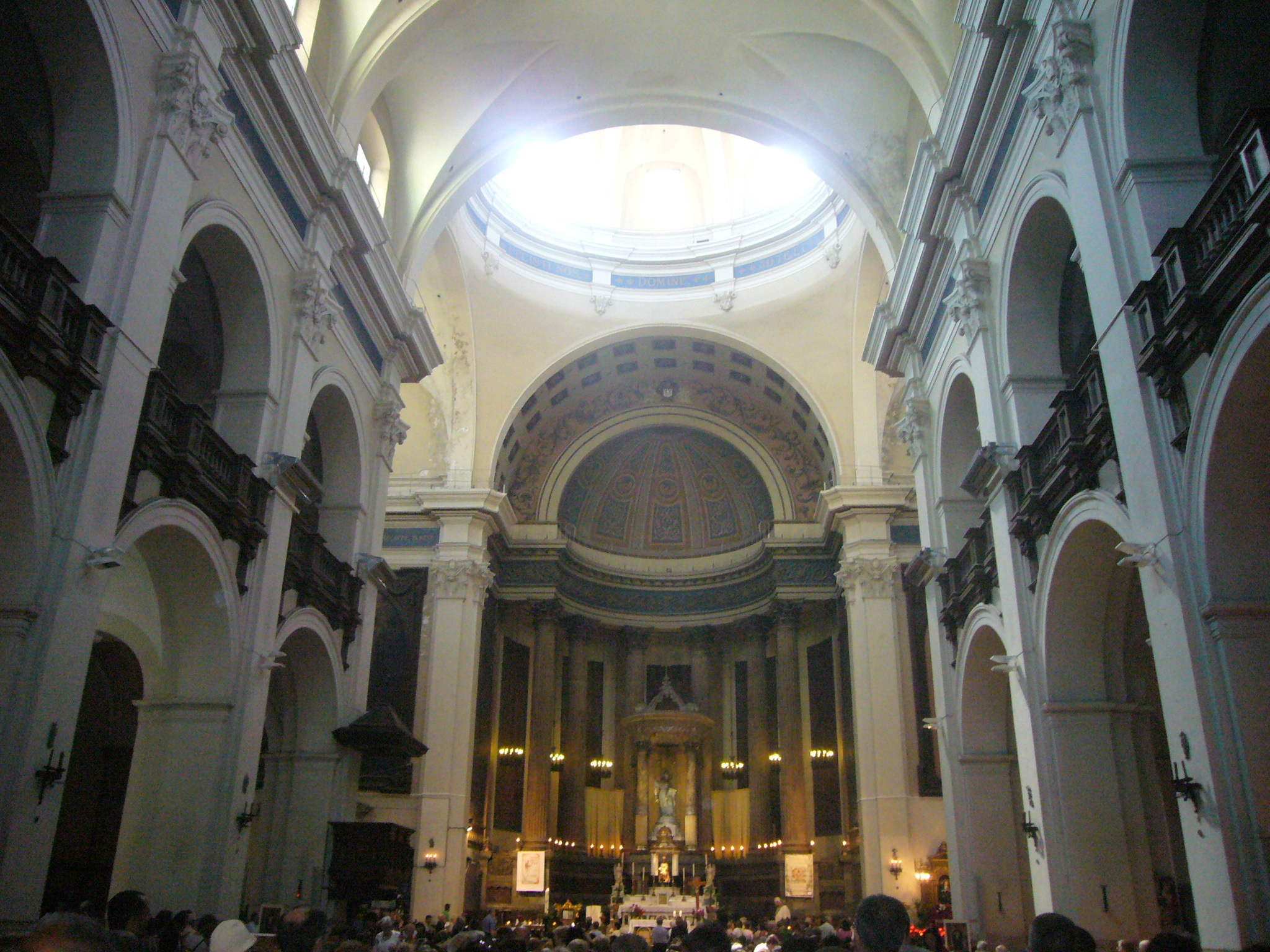
Interior of the Church of Sant Agustí in El Raval district of Barcelona where the Assembly of Catalonia was constituted on November 7, 1971. The use of religious buildings by the anti-Franco opposition was one of the reasons for the Franco regime's conflict with the Catholic Church.

The area that caused the most discomfort in the regime and in Franco himself was the appearance of Catholic sectors that opposed Francoism, a phenomenon that was due both to the generational change in the clergy and in the Spanish followers and to the new pastoral and democratizing course of the Second Vatican Council. The first two conflicts, however, took place before its beginning in the autumn of 1962. The first took place in the Basque Country in 1961, when 339 priests censured their bishops for collaborating with a regime that repressed Basque "ethnic, linguistic and social characteristics". The following year the Archbishop of Milan —the future Pope Paul VI— sent a telegram to Franco asking for clemency for a Catalan anarchist student, Jordi Conill, accused of bombing official buildings and whom the prosecutor was asking for the death penalty —he would finally be sentenced to thirty years in prison—, which motivated the protests of the Falangist students of the SEU to the cry of "Sofia Loren, YES; Montini, NO".

In November 1963 the abbot of the Monastery of Montserrat, Aureli Maria Escarré, denounced in an interview to the French newspaper Le Monde the lack of liberties in Spain —in reference to the campaign XXV Years of Peace he said: "We do not have behind us 25 years of peace, but only 25 years of victory. The victors, including the Church, which was forced to fight alongside the latter, have done nothing to end this division between victors and vanquished. This represents one of the most regrettable failures of a regime that claims to be Catholic, but in which the State does not obey the basic principles of Christianity"—, which forced his exile out of the country. From then on, many progressive Catholics —and also priests— participated in workers' and students' protests, in addition to using the churches as meeting places, taking advantage of the immunity they enjoyed due to the Concordat of 1953. As a result of these opposition activities, some one hundred priests and friars were imprisoned in the Concordat prison in Zamora between 1968 and 1975. In 1967, in a survey sent by letter by the ecclesiastical hierarchy to more than twenty thousand priests, 80% of them answered that they supported a clear separation between Church and State in accordance with the new guidelines of the Second Vatican Council.

=== Resurgence of the Catalan and Basque nationalisms ===
There was also a resurgence of cultural and political demands in Catalonia and the Basque Country. The act of protest that is usually pointed out as the beginning of the revival of Catalan nationalism was the events at the Palau de la Música that took place in May 1960 during a concert attended by several ministers and during which a large part of the audience sang a Catalan patriotic hymn that was forbidden —as a consequence of this event, the young university student Jordi Pujol, leader of the group Cristians Catalans, was arrested and sentenced to seven years in prison—. The following year the first Catalanist cultural organization, Omnium Cultural, was founded. From that moment on, support for political and cultural Catalanism grew and in 1964 the first call since the civil war to celebrate the (illegal) "national day" of September 11 took place.

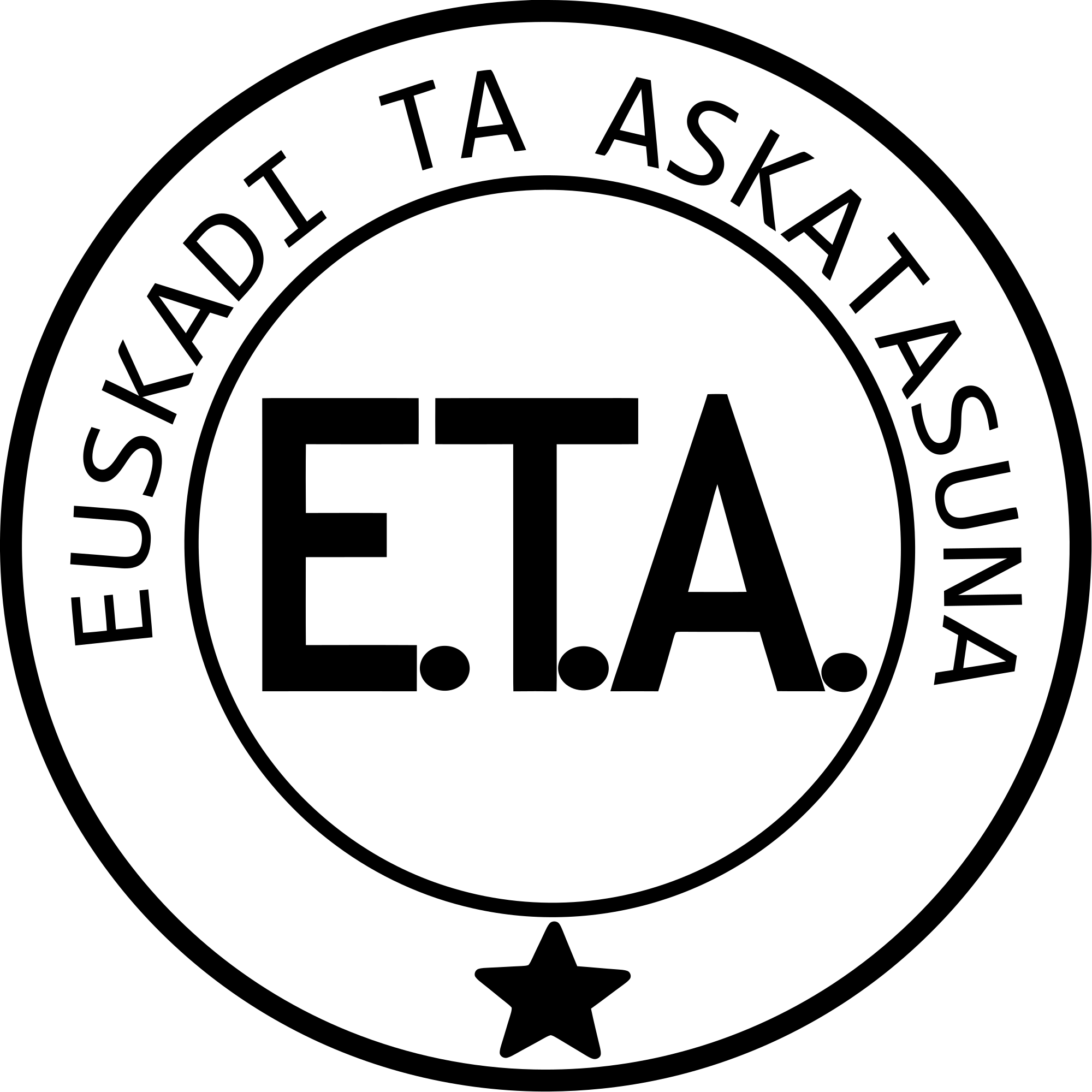
ETA logo.

As for Basque nationalism, its rebirth was also the result of the activity of the new generations that emerged after the war. These were mainly young Catholic university students, who rejected the supposed conformism and passivity of their elders —specifically the PNV and the Basque government in exile—-. Thus, in July 1959, a new nationalist party called ETA (Euskadi Ta Askatasuna, in English: Basque Homeland and Freedom) emerged, and in 1962 it defined itself as a "revolutionary movement of national liberation", under the influence of the movements that were emerging in Asia and Africa to achieve the independence of their peoples from colonial domination (and of the Latin American guerrillas in their struggle against "North American imperialism"). This is how ETA ended up opting for the "armed struggle" to put an end to the "oppression of the Basque people" carried out by Franco's dictatorship.

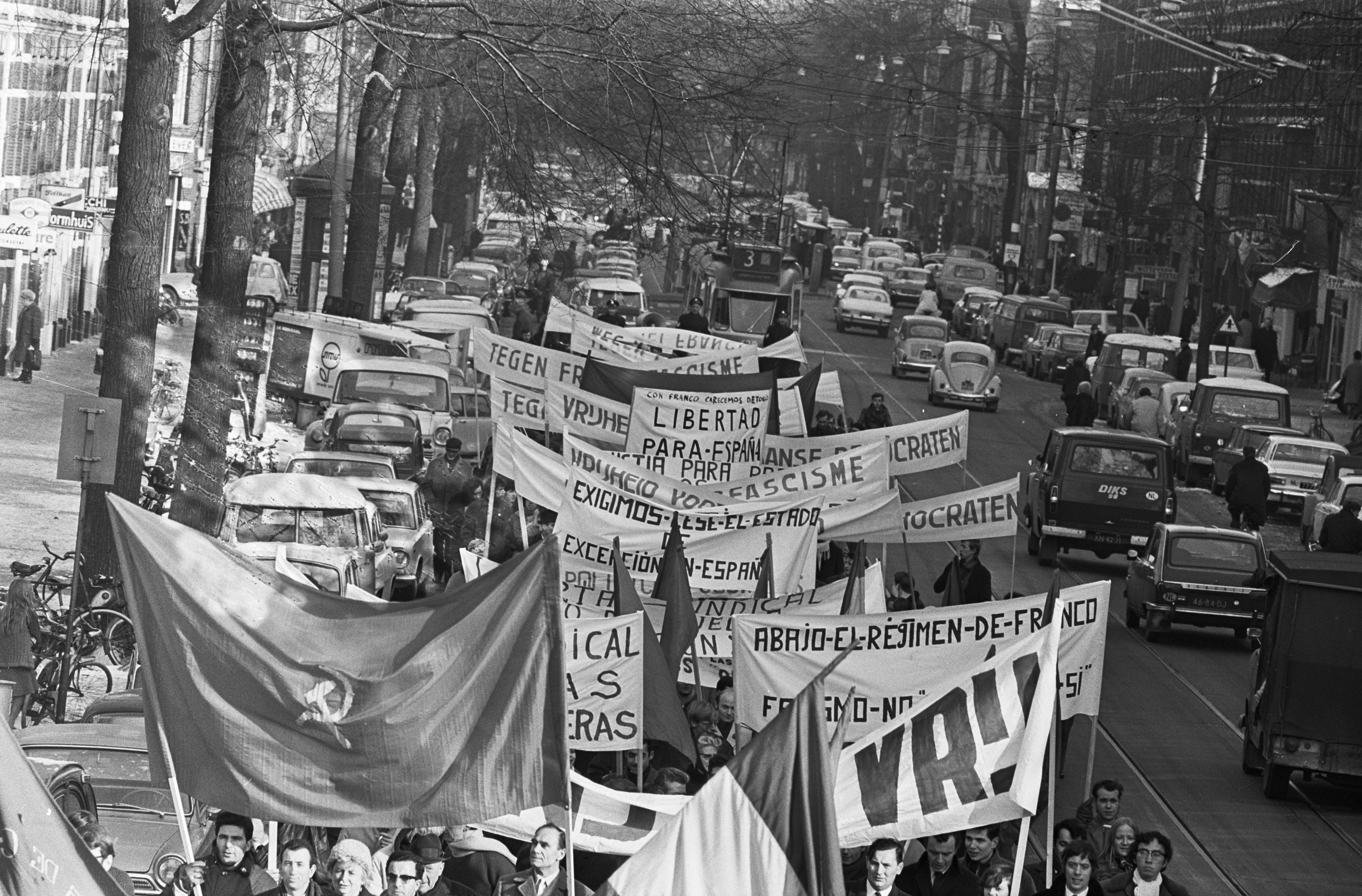
Anti-Franco demonstration in Amsterdam (February 1969) calling for the end of the state of exception in the Basque Country decreed by Franco after the assassination by ETA of the Political-Social Brigade commissioner Melitón Manzanas.

Some sources indicate that its first fatality was a twenty-two-month old girl who died in June 1960 as a result of the explosion of the bomb that had been placed in a railroad station in Amara, in San Sebastian. At the time, the attacks were attributed to the anti-fascist group DRIL, which claimed responsibility for them. However, forty years later, the former minister Ernest Lluch attributed the attack to ETA, in what would have been the band's first assassination. This hypothesis is criticized as unfounded by Francisco Letamendia and other authors, who maintain that according to Soutomayor's memoirs, he himself would have recognized and regretted the attack.

In any case, the following year ETA tried unsuccessfully to derail a train in which former Francoist combatants from the Civil War were traveling and in 1965 they perpetrated the first robbery to provide funds. In June 1968 a civil guard stopped a car carrying two ETA members at a traffic control near Villabona (Guipuzkoa). The event led to the murder of José Pardines and, later, to the persecution of the perpetrators and the death of the ETA member Txabi Etxebarrieta. In August 1968, ETA committed in Irun the first premeditated murder in the person of a police commissioner accused of torture. From then on, ETA's terrorist activity —another fatality in 1968, other in 1969, one kidnapped in 1970— would become the first political and public order problem of the Franco regime, which would respond to the challenge with a general and indiscriminate repression in the Basque Country. At the end of 1969 some two thousand Basque nationalists were in prison, accused of having some relationship with ETA.

=== Ronstruction of anti-Francoist parties in the interior of the country ===
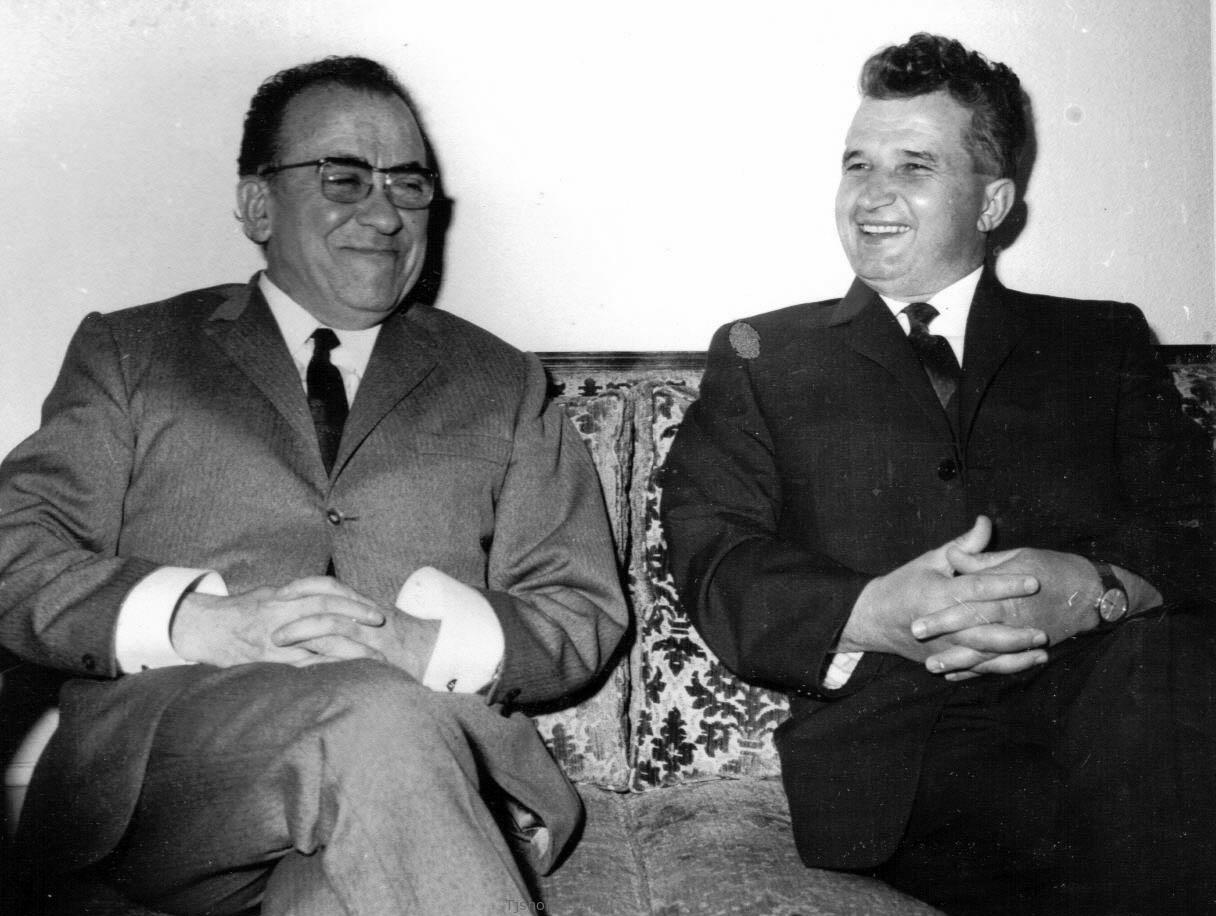
Santiago Carrillo, secretary general of the PCE, together with Ceausescu, communist dictator of Romania.

In this context of growing labor, student, ecclesiastical and regional conflicts, the "desert crossing" of the anti-Francoist opposition came to an end. The workers' parties and organizations (PSOE, UGT, CNT, PCE) were rebuilt in the interior —but not the Republican parties, which only existed nominally in exile—. Among them, the most successful was the Communist Party of Spain (PCE), which became the most active, best organized and most militant group of all the anti-Francoist opposition —and this despite suffering several splits that originated various groups of the extreme communist left—.

It was precisely these left-wing workers' organizations that were the target of Franco's repression, and it was the case of the communist leader Julián Grimau, executed in April 1963 for alleged crimes committed during the civil war, that raised the largest wave of protests throughout Europe. As a result, "political crimes" passed from military to civilian jurisdiction with the creation of the Court of Public Order (in Spanish: Tribunal de Orden Público, TOP). In the first four years of its activity, the TOP initiated more than 4,500 indictments for crimes of "illegal propaganda", "illegal association", "illegal assembly", "illegal demonstration", "defamation of the Head of State", etc. However, as a result of the growing activity of ETA, the government reestablished the full force of the Law of Banditry and Terrorism, so that "political crimes" involving any armed activity returned to military jurisdiction.

Outside the sphere of the working-class left, some groups also emerged, headed by prominent personalities, such as the Christian Democrats of José María Gil Robles —the former leader of the CEDA—, of Manuel Giménez Fernández —also a former member of the CEDA— or of the former minister Joaquín Ruiz Giménez —who in 1964 founded the magazine Cuadernos para el Diálogo, which would become the main organ of "tolerated" expression of the anti-Francoist opposition—, the social democrats of the former Falangist Dionisio Ridruejo, or the monarchists of Joaquín Satrústegui (who remained loyal to Don Juan de Borbón).

The act of major repercussion of these groups took place in June 1962 on the occasion of the celebration in Munich of the IV Congress of the European Movement, to which opposition politicians from both the interior and exile were invited, and in which they agreed on a common document in favor of "the establishment of authentically representative and democratic institutions that guarantee that the Government is based on the consent of the governed", thus avoiding reference to republic or monarchy. Franco's response was to denounce the "Munich contubernium", which meant the exile or temporary confinement of several of the participants. All this frustrated the official request, presented in February of that same year, for the opening of negotiations for the "full integration" of Spain into the European Economic Community, something about which the EEC had already declared that "states whose governments lack democratic legitimacy and whose peoples do not participate in governmental decisions either directly or through freely elected representatives, cannot claim to be admitted to the circle of peoples that form the European Communities".

== Late Francoism ==
=== Resurgence of social and political unrest (1969–1973) ===
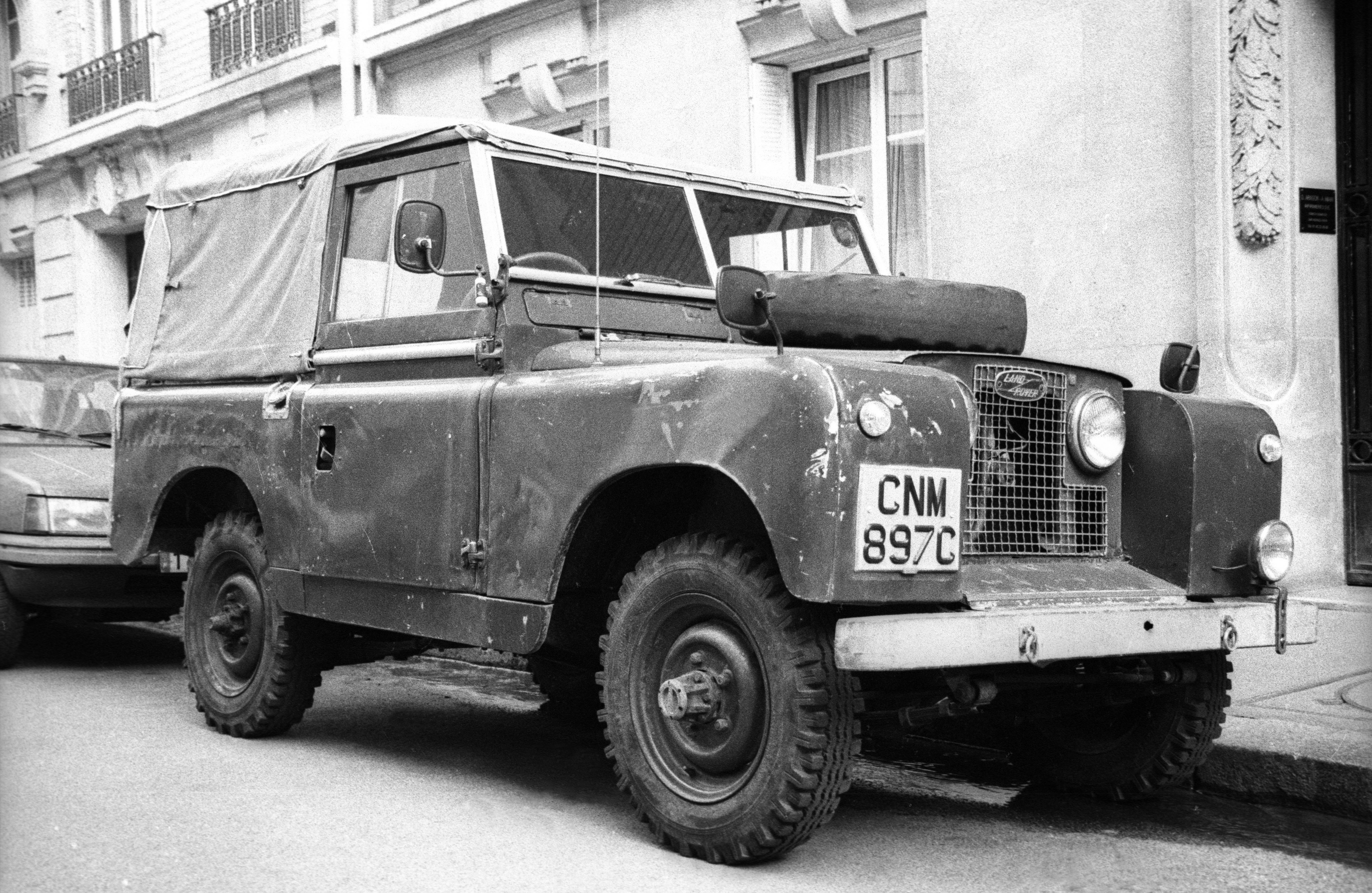
Land Rover Series II, used by the Armed Police, better known as los grises, due to the color of their uniform.

In 1969 the "monocolor government" was formed, headed by Admiral Carrero Blanco, who declared that intransigence "is an indeclinable duty when what is at stake are fundamental issues". Thus, faced with the upsurge of labor and student unrest, the government could only respond with the use of the forces of public order. Between 1969 and 1973 eight workers were killed by the police and in June 1972 the leaders of the illegal "workers' commissions" were arrested. For their part, students and interim university professors (PNNs) continued to endure the scourge of police interventions, administrative sanctions, government arrests and assaults by the new extreme right-wing groups tolerated by the authorities (Guerrilleros de Cristo Rey, Fuerza Nueva,...). The repression applied in the Basque Country and Navarre was tougher to deal with the growing terrorist activity of ETA. In 1969, for example, 1,953 people were arrested, of whom 890 were ill-treated, 510 tortured, 93 tried by the Court of Public Order and 53 in courts martial.

At the end of 1970, the government decided that a military tribunal would jointly try 16 people accused of being members of ETA (among them two priests) as an exemplary measure. But the effect achieved was exactly the opposite of what was intended, since the announcement of the summary trial that would finally be held in December in Burgos raised a wave of solidarity in the Basque Country and Navarre that was a crucial revulsive for Basque nationalism to recover its social implantation —the government in response decreed a state of emergency for six months—. In addition, during the process ETA kidnapped the German consul in San Sebastian, Eugen Beihl, releasing him on December 25. The next day the court handed down the sentence, condemning 9 of the accused to the death penalty and the rest to very long prison sentences.

1971 British documentary on Franco's Spain. Includes the dissolution of a demonstration of students from the University of Madrid by the Armed Police on horseback on the occasion of the Burgos trial (running time: 10 minutes).

What became known as the "Burgos trial" also sparked an international campaign of solidarity with the Basque people and for the reestablishment of democratic freedoms in Spain. In response, the Movement organized a large demonstration in support of Franco in Madrid's Plaza de Oriente. Likewise, the "Burgos trial" was a new milestone in the estrangement between the Catholic Church and Francoism, since it led to a joint pastoral by the bishops of San Sebastian and Bilbao criticizing the death penalty and the fact that the accused were tried by military jurisdiction, and a pronouncement by the Spanish Episcopal Conference in favor of clemency and due process of law. In the end, in view of the echo awakened and the numerous requests for clemency from all sides, General Franco commuted on December 30 the nine death sentences that had been handed down by the military tribunal.

After the "Burgos trial", tensions between the Franco regime and the Catholic Church continued to rise, especially after Cardinal Tarancón, who later became president of the Spanish Episcopal Conference, was appointed archbishop of Madrid in May 1971, since Tarancón was in favor of ending "national Catholicism" and "collaboration" with the regime. "Franco received the defection of the Church and its hierarchy with genuine bewilderment and deep bitterness, considering it privately as a real stab in the back. Carrero Blanco went even further and complained in public, in December 1972, of the ecclesiastical ingratitude towards a regime that, since 1939, "has spent some 300,000 million pesetas in the construction of temples, seminaries, charity and teaching centers, support of worship, etc.". Tension reached a peak in early May 1973 on the occasion of the funeral of a policeman who had been stabbed on May 1 by a new anti-Franco terrorist organization called FRAP. During the ceremony, right-wing extremist groups chanted death threats against the "red priests" and Cardinal Tarancón, shouting "Tarancón to the wall", an expletive that would be repeated during the following years.

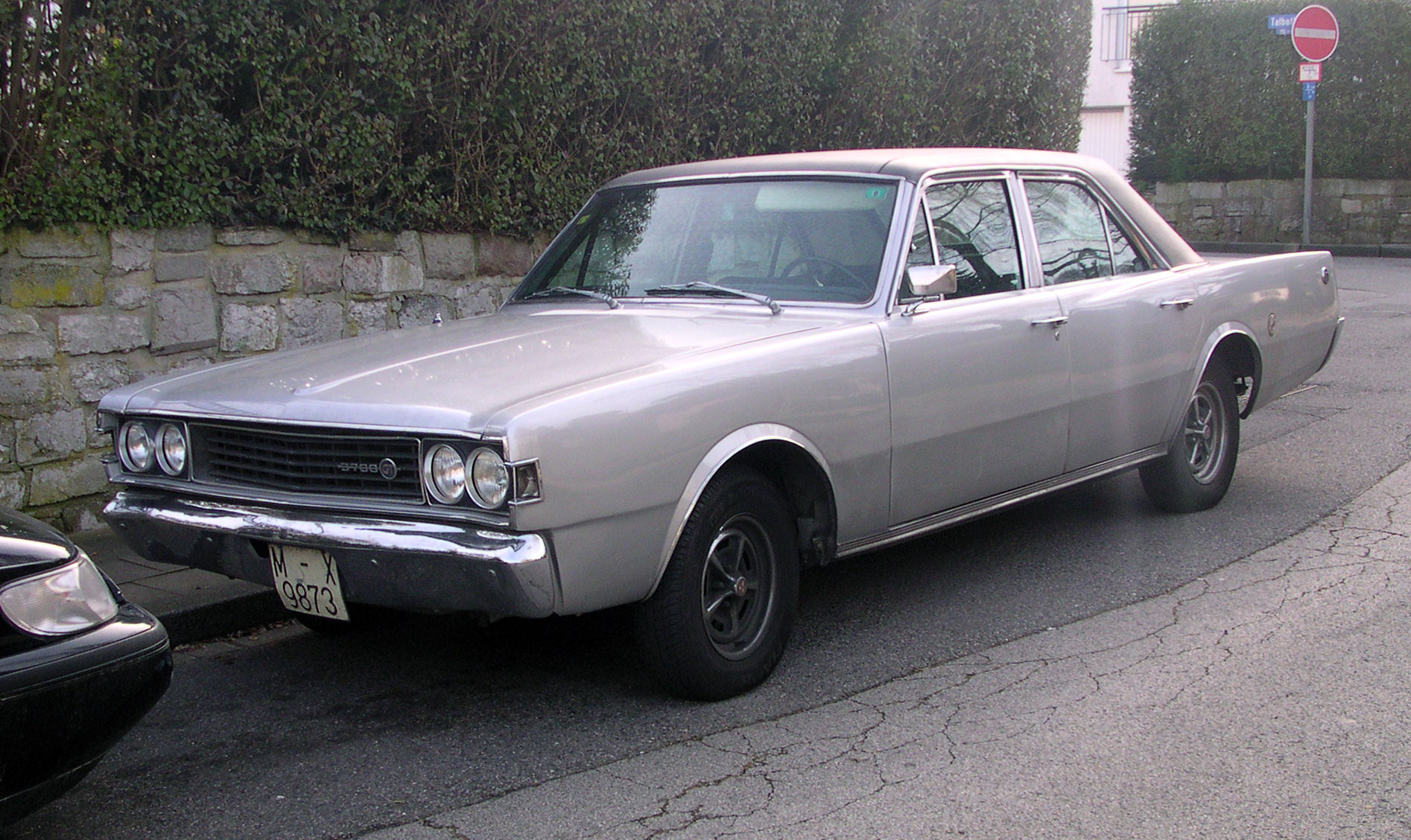
Dodge 3700 GT, model of the car in which Carrero Blanco was traveling when he suffered the attack that cost him his life.

On the morning of December 20, 1973, ETA detonated a bomb placed under the asphalt in a central street of Madrid when Admiral Carrero Blanco's official car was passing by, causing his death. The rapid assumption of power by Vice-president Torcuato Fernández Miranda, in the face of Franco's stunned reaction to the news, prevented extreme measures from being taken by the "ultra" sectors of the regime and the Army was not mobilized —at the end of the funeral there was an attempt of aggression against Cardinal Tarancón who had officiated the ceremony—. Thus opened the most critical political crisis of the entire Franco regime, since the person who had been designated by Franco to ensure the survival of his regime after his death had been assassinated.

=== Final two years (1974–1975) ===
The "open-minded" mood of the new government presided over by Carlos Arias Navarro, known as the "spirit of February 12", did not last long. At the end of February 1974, the Archbishop of Bilbao, Monsignor Antonio Añoveros Ataún, was ordered to leave Spain for having signed a pastoral letter in favor of the "fair freedom" of the Basque people. And only a few days later, on March 2, the Catalan anarchist Salvador Puig Antich, accused of the death of a policeman, was executed by garrotte (together with el polaco Heinz Chez), in spite of protest demonstrations harshly repressed by the police and requests for clemency from all over the world.

The isolation of Francoism became evident on April 25, when a military coup in Portugal ended the Salazarist dictatorship, then the oldest regime in Europe. The perception that Francoism was entering a period of decline grew in July, when General Franco was hospitalized with thrombophlebitis and temporarily transferred his powers to Prince Juan Carlos. After a partial recovery, he resumed his authority in early September.

A few days later, on September 13, a brutal attack by ETA killed 12 people —and wounded more than 80— due to a bomb placed in the Rolando cafeteria in Calle del Correo in Madrid, next to Puerta del Sol, which was frequented by police officers from the nearby General Directorate of Security.

As the death of General Franco drew nearer, there was a gradual strengthening of the anti-Franco opposition, which at the same time converged towards the unification of its various proposals to put an end to the dictatorship. The model that was followed was that of the Assemblea de Catalunya, a unitary platform created in Barcelona in November 1971 that brought together all the parties and organizations of the Catalan anti-Francoist opposition without excluding the communists (PSUC in Catalonia). In addition, its slogan "Freedom, Amnesty and Statute of Autonomy" would be adopted by all the opposition.

Poster of the Democratic Junta founded in Paris in July 1974.

Thus, on July 30, 1974, Santiago Carrillo, secretary general of the Communist Party of Spain, and Professor Rafael Calvo Serer presented in Paris the Democratic Junta —the first result of the process of convergence of the state-wide opposition— in which, in addition to the PCE, the Socialist Party of the Interior of Enrique Tierno Galván —which would soon begin to be called the Popular Socialist Party— were integrated, the Carlist Party —which had drifted towards the "self-managing socialism" advocated by Carlos Hugo de Borbón Parma— and two prominent independents, the lawyer Antonio García Trevijano and the aforementioned monarchist intellectual Rafael Calvo Serer —who apparently were the promoters of the idea— as well as some groups of the extreme communist left, such as the Partido del Trabajo de España, and the trade union organization Comisiones Obreras, increasingly under the orbit of the PCE. The program of the Junta Democrática was based on the "democratic rupture" with Francoism through citizen mobilization. In the interior of Spain the Junta Democrática was presented clandestinely in a Madrid hotel in January 1975. Its purpose was the formation of a provisional government that would reestablish liberties and call a referendum on the form of state, monarchy or republic.

However, the PCE did not manage to integrate into its "unitary body" the opposition forces which were not willing to accept the communist hegemony —with the PSOE at its head— and which also disagreed with the members of the Democratic Junta on a fundamental issue: that they were willing to accept the monarchy of Juan Carlos if it led the country towards a fully representative political system —as opposed to the rejection of "Franco's successor" by the Democratic Junta—. These groups ended up constituting their own unitary body in June 1975, called the Democratic Convergence Platform, made up of the PSOE —which had just renewed its program and leadership at the Congress held in October 1974 in Suresnes, from which a young labor lawyer from Seville, Felipe González, had been elected as the new Secretary General, replacing the veteran Rodolfo Llopis— and the opposition Christian Democrats led by José María Gil Robles and Joaquín Ruiz Giménez, as well as the PNV, the group of social democrats led by the ex-Falangist Dionisio Ridruejo, and several far-left communist groups, such as the Communist Movement of Spain (MCE) and the Revolutionary Organization of Workers (ORT).

Flag of the FRAP, an extreme left-wing group that resorted to "armed struggle" to put an end to the dictatorship. Three of its militants were shot on September 27, 1975, after having been convicted in a court martial.

The beginning of the economic crisis in 1974, which worsened in 1975 with the consequent increase in inflation (17%) and unemployment (700,000 unemployed, 5% of the active population), and which coincided with two financial scandals (Reace and SOFICO), fed the most important wave of strikes and workers' mobilizations in the history of Francoism, which were accompanied by the mobilizations of university students —and that of the "new social movements" such as the neighborhood and feminist movements—.

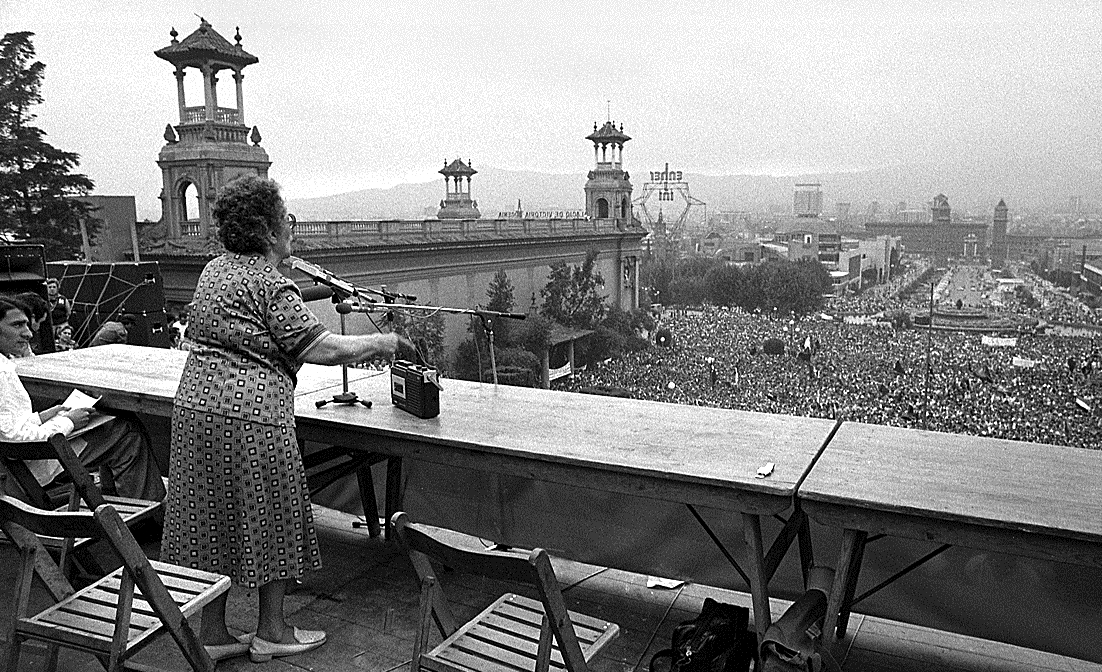
1977 CNT protest at Plaça d'Espanya square with Federica Montseny speaking

On the other hand, the Army intelligence services arrested 11 officers accused of being the leaders of the Military Democratic Union (UMD), a clandestine military clandestine organization founded in August 1974 in Barcelona which, following the Portuguese model, tried to get the younger officers of the Army to support a democratic change in Spain —but its scope was very reduced and it only achieved the support of about 250 lieutenants, captains and commanders—.

Terrorist activity increased, both by ETA —18 fatalities in 1974 and 14 in 1975— and by the FRAP —three attacks in 1975 resulting in death—, which in turn intensified the repression, leading to the approval in August 1975 of a decree-law "for the prevention and prosecution of the crimes of terrorism and subversion against social peace and personal security" which revalidated the military jurisdiction as in the early Franco regime. This repressive spiral was especially severe in the Basque Country.

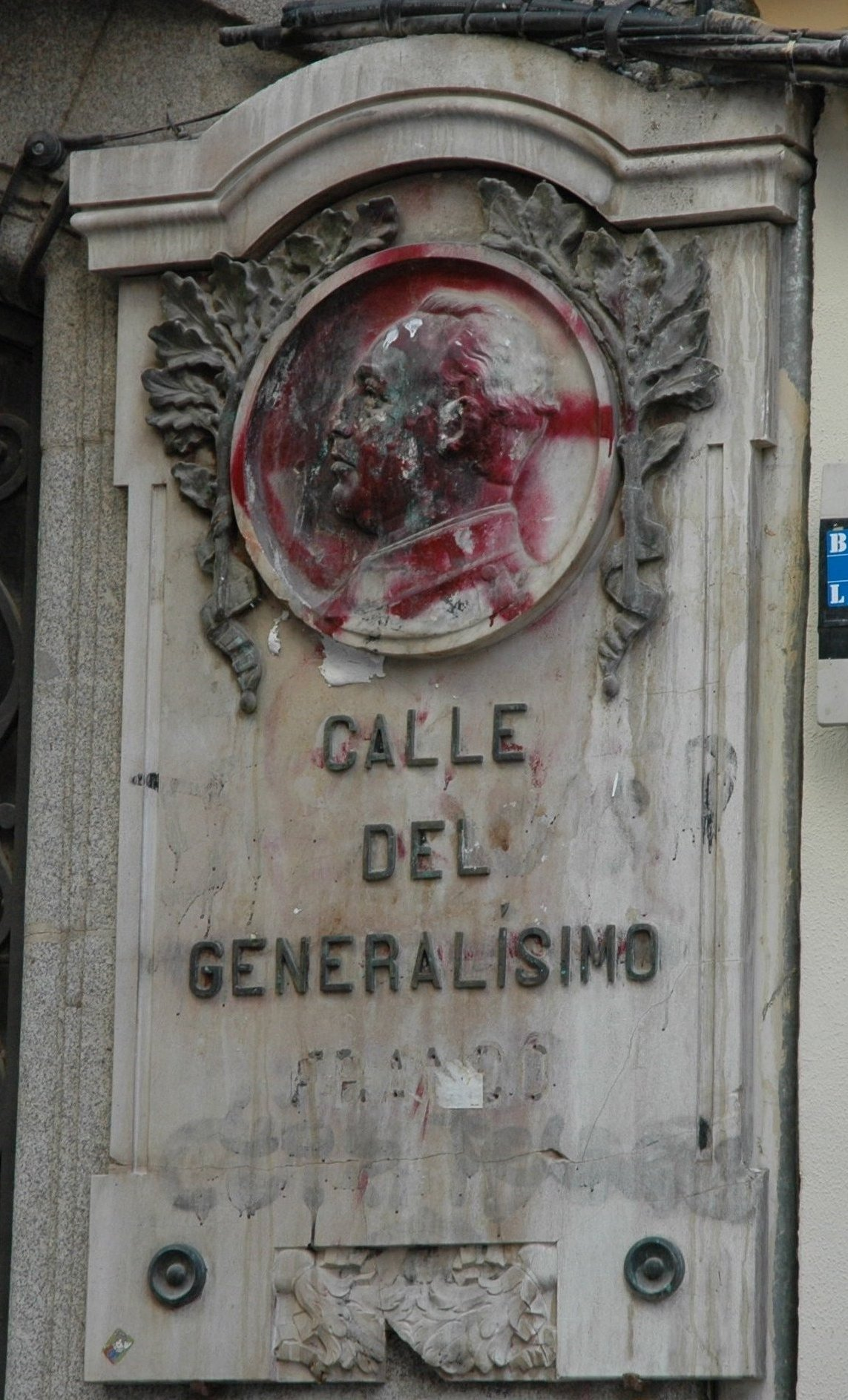
Anti-Franco graffiti on the street dedicated to Franco in Avila (2005).

In application of the anti-terrorist legislation, between August 29 and September 17, 1975, three ETA and eight FRAP militants were court-martialed and sentenced to death, which provoked an important popular response and rejection abroad, as well as requests for clemency from the main European political leaders —including Pope Paul VI—-. Despite this, Franco did not commute the death sentences of two of the three ETA militants (Angel Otaegui and Juan Paredes Manot) and three of the eight FRAP members (Jose Luis Sanchez Bravo, Ramon Garcia Sanz and Jose Humberto-Francisco Baena), and all five were shot on September 27, 1975. This event, described as "brutal" by most of the European press, only accentuated the international rejection of Francoism and led to numerous anti-Franco demonstrations in the main European cities. Likewise, the ambassadors of the main European countries left Madrid, with the result that the Franco regime once again experienced an isolation and reprobation very similar to those it had suffered in the immediate post-war period. Pope Paul VI expressed "his vibrant condemnation of a repression so harsh that it has ignored the appeals that have been raised from all sides against those executions". "Unfortunately we have not been heard," he concluded. For its part, the Permanent Commission of the Episcopal Conference made public a document in which, after condemning terrorism, it stated that "repressive measures are not enough" and that "the loyal position of political opposition or criticism of the government... cannot be legitimately considered as a criminal act".

In response, on October 1, 1975, the Movement organized a rally in support of Franco in Madrid's Plaza de Oriente. That same day a communist group of unknown origin made its appearance and assassinated four policemen in Madrid, for which it would end up calling itself GRAPO, Grupo de Resistencia Antifascista Primero de Octubre (in English: First of October Anti-Fascist Resistance Group). The "Junta Democrática" and the "Plataforma" issued their first joint communiqué in which they pledged to "make a united effort to make possible the urgent formation of a broad, democratically organized coalition, without exclusions, capable of guaranteeing the exercise, without restrictions, of political freedoms".

Twelve days after the great rally in the Plaza de Oriente, General Franco fell ill. On October 30, aware of his seriousness —he had already suffered two heart attacks—, he transferred his powers to Prince Juan Carlos. On November 3, he underwent a life-or-death operation in an improvised operating room in the palace of El Pardo, and was then transferred to the "La Paz" hospital in Madrid, where he underwent a new surgical intervention. Early in the morning of November 20, 1975, the president of the government Carlos Arias Navarro announced on television the death of the "Caudillo".

== See also ==
- Anti-fascism
- Exhumation and reburial of Francisco Franco
- Francoist Spain

== Bibliography ==
- ANSON, Luis María (1995), Don Juan (in Spanish), Barcelona, Plaza y Janés. ISBN 84-01-45138-8
- CARRILLO-LINARES, Alberto (2008), Subversivos y malditos en la Universidad de Sevilla (1965–1977) (in Spanish), Sevilla, Consejería de la Presidencia. ISBN 978-84-612-7352-2
- GIL PECHARROMÁN, Julio (2008). Con permiso de la autoridad. La España de Franco (1939–1975) (in Spanish). Madrid: Temas de Hoy. ISBN 978-84-8460-693-2.
- HEINE, Hartmut (1983). La oposición política al franquismo. De 1939 a 1952 (in Spanish). Barcelona: Crítica. ISBN 84-7423-198-1.
- HERNÁNDEZ SANDOICA, Elena et al. (2007).Estudiantes contra Franco (1939-1975) (in Spanish), Madrid, La Esfera de los Libros. ISBN 9788497345484
- JULIÁ, Santos (1999). Un siglo de España. Política y sociedad (in Spanish). Madrid: Marcial Pons. ISBN 84-9537903-1.
- MATEOS, Abdón and SOTO, Álvaro (1997), El final del franquismo, 1959-1975 (in Spanish), Madrid, Temas de Hoy. ISBN 84-7679-326-X
- MORADIELLOS, Enrique (2000). La España de Franco (1939–1975). Política y sociedad (in Spanish). Madrid: Síntesis. ISBN 84-7738-740-0.
- PAYNE, Stanley (1997), El primer franquismo, 1939-1959 (in Spanish), Madrid, Temas de Hoy. ISBN 84-7679-325-1
- PRESTON, Paul (1998) [1993]. Franco "Caudillo de España" [Franco. A Biography] (in Spanish). First edition in Mitos Bolsillo. Barcelona. ISBN 84-397-0241-8.
- SAN MARTÍN, Ignacio. "Servicio especial. A las órdenes de Carrero Blanco (de Castellana a El Aaiún)" (in Spanish), Barcelona, Planeta, 1983.
- SUÁREZ FERNÁNDEZ, Luis (2011). Franco. Los años decisivos. 1931–1945 (in Spanish). Barcelona: Ariel. ISBN 978-84-344-1332-0.
- TUSELL, Javier (1997), La transición española (in Spanish), Madrid, Temas de Hoy. ISBN 84-7679-327-8
