= Serer =

Serer may refer to:

- Serer people
- Serer language
- Serer religion
- Rafael Calvo Serer (1916-1988), Spanish historian
