= Partido Demócrata Popular =

Partido Demócrata Popular may refer to:

- Popular Democratic Party (Dominican Republic)
- People's Democratic Party (Spain) (1982-89)
- People's Democratic Party (Spain) (1974-77)
