= Spanish Social Democratic Union =

Defunct Spanish political party

Spanish Social Democratic Union Unión Social Demócrata Española
- Secretary-General: Dionisio Ridruejo
- Founded: 1974
- Dissolved: 1979
- Preceded by: Social Party of Democratic Action
- Ideology: Liberal democracy Social liberalism Federalism
- Political position: Centre
- National affiliation: Democratic Convergence Platform; Social Democratic Federation

Spanish Social Democratic Union (Spanish: Unión Social Demócrata Española; USDE) was a social-liberal political party in Spain that opposed the Francoist State and advocated a liberal democracy in Spain. The USDE was founded in 1974 by Dionisio Ridruejo.

== History ==
It was the successor of the Social Party of Democratic Action founded in 1957. The USDE had social-Catholic and liberal internal currents.

In 1975 the USDE joined the Democratic Convergence Platform. Fernando Chueca Goitia, one of the founders of USDE, left the party in July 1976 to join the People's Democratic Party, where he was elected president in December of that year.

== See also ==
- Democratic Convergence Platform
- List of political parties in Spain
