= Democratic Junta of Spain =

Defunct Anti-Francoist political group in Spain

Democratic Junta of Spain Junta Democrática de España
- President: Antonio García-Trevijano
- Founded: 1974
- Dissolved: 1976
- Merger of: Communist Party of Spain; People's Socialist Party; Comisiones Obreras; Democratic Justice; Party of Labour of Spain; Socialist Alliance of Andalusia; Carlist Party; Independents
- Succeeded by: Democratic Coordination
- Ideology: Democracy; Antifascism; Laicism
- Political position: Centre to Far-left

The Democratic Junta of Spain (Spanish: Junta Democrática de España, JDE) was a Spanish organization that coordinated various pro-democracy parties, unions and associations (all illegal) during the late Francoist State.

== History ==
=== Origins ===
The Democratic Junta of Spain was a body created by the initiative of Antonio García-Trevijano, seeking to form a coalition of political, union and social forces of the opposition to Francoist Spain, including the Communist Party of Spain, led by Santiago Carrillo, and independent personalities linked to Don Juan de Borbón, led by Rafael Calvo Serer. The JDE was officially launched on July 29, 1974 in Paris by Santiago Carrillo and Rafael Calvo Serer. Subsequently the Party of Labour of Spain (PTE), the Carlist Party led by Carlos Hugo de Borbón Parma, the Popular Socialist Party (PSP) led by Enrique Tierno Galván and Raul Morodo, the Socialist Alliance of Andalusia, the union Comisiones Obreras, the Association Justicia Democrática and a number of independent figures such as José Vidal Beneyto and aristocrat José Luis de Vilallonga joined the Junta.

=== The 12 points ===
The twelve points of the program of the Democratic Junta of Spain, written by Antonio García-Trevijano, were the following:

1. The formation of an interim government to replace the current one, to return to the Spanish man and women, aged eighteen, their full citizenship through the legal recognition of all freedoms, democratic rights and duties.
2. The absolute amnesty for all the responsibilities for acts of a political nature and the immediate release of all the political prisoners.
3. The legalization of political parties, without exclusions.
4. Freedom of association and returning to the labor unions the heritage of the "vertical union".
5. The rights of strike, assembly and peaceful protest.
6. Freedom of the press, radio, opinion and objective information of state media, especially television.
7. Judicial independence and unity of the judicial function.
8. The armed forces must be politically neutral, professional and exclusively used for external defense.
9. The recognition under the Spanish unit of the state, of the political personality of the Catalan, Basque and Galician peoples.
10. The separation of church and state.
11. Holding a referendum to choose the final form of the State, either a republic or a monarchy.
12. The integration of Spain in the European Communities, the respect of all the international agreements and the recognition of the principle of international peaceful coexistence.

=== Platajunta ===
In 1976 the JDE formed a common front with the Democratic Convergence Platform, finally merging the two platforms in 1976. The merge was called Democratic Convergence, also known as the "Platajunta".
