= Antonio García-Trevijano =

Antonio García-Trevijano Forte
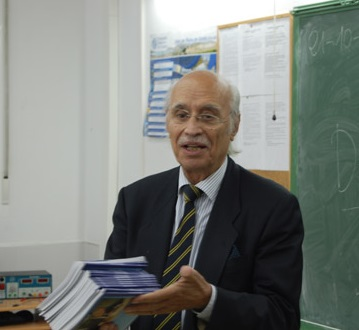
- Antonio García-Trevijano Forte
- Born: Antonio García-Trevijano Forte; 18 July 1927; Alhama de Granada, Spain
- Died: 28 February 2018 (aged 90); Madrid, Spain
- Other name: Maverick
- Citizenship: Spain
- Education: University of Granada
- Occupations: Lawyer, notary public, jurist, politician, philosopher and art critic
- Known for: Democratic Junta of Spain, Democratic Convergence Platform, Platajunta, MCRC
- Spouse: Francine Chouraki Levent
- Children: 2
- Parent(s): Antonio García-Trevijano and Ángeles Forte
- Website: MCRC website; Documentary; Documentary; Personal Twitter

Antonio García-Trevijano Forte (18 July 1927 – 28 February 2018) was a Spanish republican lawyer, notary public, jurist, philosopher, art critic, author and political activist. Born in Alhama de Granada, he was a prominent figure in the opposition to the Francoist dictatorship.

== Political activism ==
In 1974 García-Trevijano organised meetings in Paris between Don Juan de Borbón and the republican groups plus the publishing group Ruedo Ibérico, in which the legitimate heir to the Spanish throne expressed his rejection of Franco's decree appointing his son Juan Carlos as his successor. He acted as a promoter of political freedom throughout Spain and was the leader of the Citizens' Movement towards the Constitutional Republic of Spain (MCRC).

== Repression ==
He was tried for high treason before the Court of Public Order (Marshal of Ghent) because of his intervention in Equatorial Guinea. He has had five passports withdrawn, suffered three arrests and two fines, was the victim of a serious attack for his declarations to the BBC when Franco was dying, and was prosecuted by the Public Order Court (Gómez Chaparro) for an offense against the State and imprisoned for four months by order of Manuel Fraga Iribarne.

== Bibliography ==
García-Trevijano wrote a blog and in the Journal of the Constitutional Republic. A political analyst in the Spanish press, he wrote more than 50 articles in the Reporter magazine, over a thousand articles in ABC, El País, El Independiente, El Mundo, and La Razón. He has written several monographs in private law, a short book titled The Truth of my Intervention in Guinea. He has also written the books The Democratic Alternative, The Discourse of the Republic, Confronting the Big Lie—which has been published in English with the title A Pure Theory of Democracy by the University Press of America, Passions of servitude, an art book titled Donatello, Sculptor of the Childhood, and a book on philosophy of art entitled From Modernity to Modernism. Atheism Aesthetic: Art of the Twentieth Century. He has also written prologues to Palace of Injustice and El País: Culture as Business.

== Personal life ==
García-Trevijano was Professor of Commercial Law at the University of Granada and a notary, and worked as an attorney in Madrid from 1960 until his death. He died on 28 February 2018 from natural causes. He was 90 years old.

== See also ==
- Felipe González
- Henry Kissinger
- Infante Juan, Count of Barcelona
- Manuel Fraga Iribarne
- Santiago Carrillo

== Notes and references ==
- García-Trevijano Forte, Antonio. Pasiones de servidumbre. 2001. Madrid: Foca ISBN 84-95440-07-5
- García-Trevijano Forte, Antonio. Frente a la gran mentira. 1996. Madrid: Espasa-Calpe. ISBN 84-239-7741-2
- García-Trevijano Forte, Antonio. "A pure theory of democracy"
- García Viñó, Manuel. El País: La cultura como negocio. 2006. Tafalla: Txalaparta. ISBN 84-8136-456-8
- Archivo Juan J. Linz sobre la transición española
- "C.E. Camacho sale Trevijano se queda". 1976. Triunfo 697,11
- "Brutal atentado contra un grupo de profesionales". November 7, 1975. Informaciones.
- The Times Madrid correspondent. "Opposition to hold summit meeting in Madrid today". September 4, 1976. The Times, 3.
- Secretary of US State Kissinger. CONFIDENTIAL STATE 135254. EUROPEAN COMMUNITY AND SPAIN: OPPOSITION CAUSES CONTROVERSY. 10 June 1975.
- Martínez Reverte, Javier. Habla el conde de Barcelona. 22 de Enero 1974. Diario Pueblo.
