= Ignacio Camuñas =

Spanish politician (born 1940)

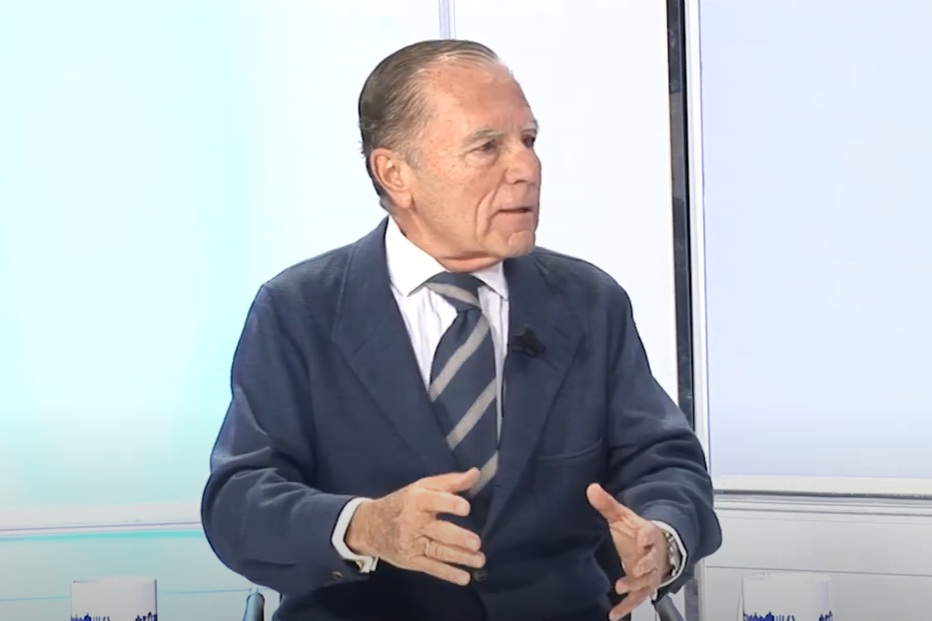
- Ignacio Camuñas Solís

Deputy Minister of Relations with the Cortes of Spain, without portfolio
- In office 5 July 1977 – 27 September 1977
- Prime Minister: Adolfo Suárez
- Preceded by: Office established
- Succeeded by: Office abolished

Personal details
- Born: Ignacio Camuñas Solís; 1 September 1940 Madrid, Spain
- Party: PDP (1974–1977); UCD (1977–1982); Vox (2013–2014)

Ignacio Camuñas Solís (born 1 September 1940) is a Spanish politician who served as Deputy Minister of Relations with the Cortes of Spain, without portfolio in 1977.
