= People's Democratic Party (Spain, 1974) =

People's Democratic Party Partido Demócrata Popular
- Abbreviation: PDP
- President: Fernando Chueca
- General Secretary: Ignacio Camuñas
- Founded: December 1974
- Legalised: February 17, 1977
- Dissolved: December 16, 1977
- Succeeded by: Union of the Democratic Centre
- Headquarters: Madrid
- Ideology: Liberalism
- Political position: Centre
- International affiliation: Liberal International

The People's Democratic Party (Spanish: Partido Demócrata Popular, PDP) was a Spanish political party of liberal centre, integrated in the Union of the Democratic Centre (UCD). Its president was Fernando Chueca, and his Secretary General was Ignacio Camuñas.

== History ==
The party was founded by Ignacio Camuñas in December 1974 on the basis of the Circle of Studies New Generation (Spanish: Círculo de Estudios Nueva Generación), created in 1972. By 1976 the party was part of the Democratic Convergence Platform and Democratic Coordination, but withdrew from the latter in June of that same year. On 24 September 1976, together with Democratic Left of Catalonia, the Social-Liberal Coalition was established.

Fernando Chueca Goitia, founder of the Spanish Social Democratic Union (USDE), left the party in July 1976 to join the People's Democratic Party, where he was elected president in December of that year. The party was admitted as a member of the Liberal International during the Congress that took place in Barcelona in October 1976; also, the PDP participated in the creation of Union of the Democratic Centre (UCD) in 1977, forming the liberal wing of UCD. The party was legalized on February 17, 1977.

In the general elections of 1977 the party obtained 6 deputies within UCD: Ignacio Camuñas, José Manuel Paredes Grosso, Francisco Ruiz Risueño, Manuel Bermejo and José María Bravo de Laguna. Subsequently, on December 16, 1977, the party agreed to dissolve and become a full member of UCD.
