= Geneva Manifesto =

The so-called Geneva Manifesto (Spanish: Manifiesto de Ginebra) is a term referring to the declarations made by Infante Juan, Count of Barcelona in the Swiss newspaper Journal de Genève published on 11 November 1942, in which he called for the formal restoration of the Spanish monarchy with him as King, as he was Alfonso XIII's legitimate heir. King Alfonso died a year earlier.

== Background ==
Infante Juan originally supported the Francoist regime, which matched with his political beliefs, since he was a long-time supporter of Spanish Action—in fact, Eugenio Vegas Latapié, one of his founders, was one of his closest advisers. He tried to join the Nationalist faction during the Spanish Civil War, though he was stopped by Emilio Mola and Francisco Franco twice, respectively. Historian Hartmut Heine explains that Infante Juan's overt support for the Nationalist faction made him "miss the opportunity to be identified as the king of all Spaniards".

== Consequences ==
According to Heine, the Geneva Manifesto appealed to monarchists, which led to a surge of restorationist movements.

== Bibliography ==
- Heine, Hartmut (1983). La oposición política al franquismo. De 1939 a 1952 (in Spanish). Crítica. ISBN 8474231981.
