= Democratic Convergence Platform =

Democratic Convergence Platform Plataforma de Convergencia Democrática
- Founded: June 1975
- Dissolved: March 1976
- Merger of: PSOE; Communist Movement; Democratic Left; Spanish Social Democratic Union; Carlist Party; Basque Advisory Council; Socialist Party of Catalonia–Regrouping; Democratic Union of the Valencian Country; Galician Social Democratic Party; Unión General de Trabajadores; Revolutionary Workers' Organization; Independents
- Succeeded by: Democratic Coordination
- Ideology: Democracy; Antifascism; Laicism; Defence of labor rights Federalism
- Political position: Centre-right to far-left

The Democratic Convergence Platform (Spanish: Plataforma de Convergencia Democrática, PCD) was a Spanish organization that coordinated various pro-democracy parties, unions and associations (all illegal) towards the end of Francoist Spain.

== History ==
=== Origins ===
In its founding manifesto the PCD called for the establishment of democracy in Spain and the opening of a constitutional process, pledging to promote a multiparty democracy, with a federal state structure, the freedom of the political prisoners, the return of exiles, freedom of association, right to strike, freedom of expression, association, assembly, demonstration, the abolition of all special courts and all those agencies and repressive organizations of the Francoist State, free elections, and the right to self-determination and self-government for the nationalities and regions of Spain.

The organizations signing the manifesto were the Spanish Socialist Workers Party (PSOE), the Communist Movement of Spain (MCE), Democratic Left, the Revolutionary Organization of Workers (ORT), Socialist Party of Catalonia–Regrouping, the Basque Advisory Council, the Democratic Union of the Valencian Country, the Spanish Social Democratic Union, the Carlist Party, the Galician Social Democratic Party and the General Union of Workers (UGT) and independent Social Democrats, liberals and christian-democrats. The PCD was dominated by the PSOE.

=== Platajunta ===
In 1976 the PCD formed a common front with the Democratic Junta of Spain, finally merging the two platforms in 1976. The merge was called Democratic Convergence, also known as the "Platajunta".
