= Rafael Calvo Serer =

Rafael Calvo Serer (6 October 1916 at Valencia, Spain – 19 April 1988 at Pamplona, Navarra, Spain) was a Professor of History of Spanish Philosophy, a writer, essayist. He was president of the Council of Administration of the newspaper Madrid, in which he published numerous articles on national and international politics. In 1949 he obtained the National Award for Literature for his work España sin problema.

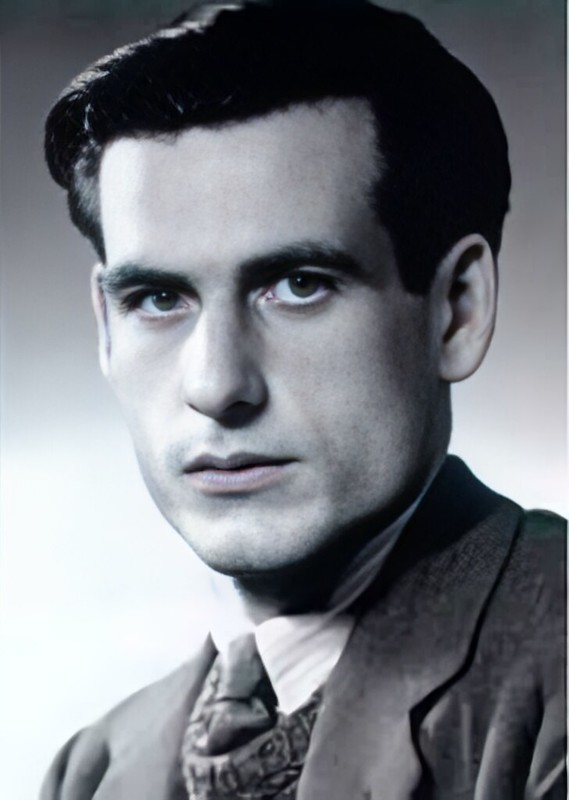
Image of Rafael Calvo Serer

His main works are: España sin problema (1949), El fin de la época de las revoluciones (1949), Teoría de la restauración (1952), La configuración del futuro (1953), Política de integración (1955), La aproximación de los neoliberales à la actitud tradicional (1956), La fuerza creadora de la libertad (1958), Nuevas formas democráticas de la libertad (1960), La literatura universal sobre la guerra de España (1962), La política mundial de los Estados Unidos (1962), Las nuevas democracias (1964).
