= Crime of Fuencarral street =

1888 murder in Madrid

The crime of Fuencarral street (also known as the murder on Fuencarral street or the case of Fuencarral street) was a murder that took place in 1888 on the second floor, left side, of number 109 of Fuencarral Street in Madrid. This number does not exist on the current street map, since it jumps from number 107 to 111, with gate number 1 of the Glorieta de Bilbao roundabout between them. Therefore, number 109 would correspond to current number 95, on the corner with Divino Pastor Street.

On the morning of 2 July 1888, neighbors alerted the police, who discovered the body of Doña Luciana Borcino, widow of Vázquez-Varela, lying on her back, covered with wet rags that had been doused in lamp oil and set on fire. She was found in a closed room. In the next room, they found a bulldog and Doña Luciana's house-maid, Higinia Balaguer Ostalé, both sleeping under the effects of a narcotic drug.

The investigation by the police had the Spanish society of the time on tenterhooks. This was one of the first crimes reported by the Spanish press and it even reached the upper echelons of the political class. According to Morte Landa, (..) el crimen de la calle Fuencarral introdujo el sensacionalismo en España (...) (Note: English: (...) the crime of Fuencarral Street introduced yellow journalism in Spain (...)) and according to El País, the case (...) cambió la forma de hacer periodismo (...) (Note: English: "(...) changed the way of doing journalism (...)")

== The crime and the police investigation ==
On the morning of 2 July, the neighbors of number 109 of Fuencarral Street alerted the police of a strong smell of oil and burnt flesh coming from the second floor, on the left side of the building. The police broke down the door of the small apartment and found the lifeless body of Luciana Borcino, widow of Vázquez-Varela (known around the neighborhood as the widow Varela) lying face up on her bed and covered with rags doused in lamp oil that had previously been burned inside the closed room.

The widow Varela, originally from Vigo and a resident of Madrid for many years, was a wealthy woman, known around the city for her charity works. She had been stabbed three times, one of them through the heart, which caused her death. The preliminary investigation showed no evidence that robbery was the motive. The murder had been committed on 1 July.

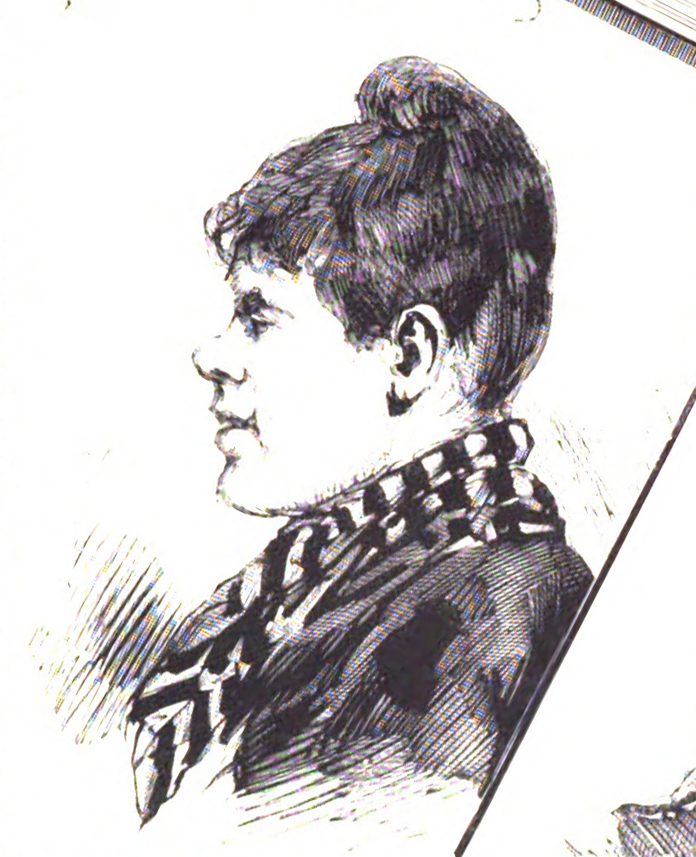
Dolores Ávila, convicted as an accomplice.

The police took the new housemaid Higinia Balaguer Ostalé, who had been found unconscious in another room in the house, to the station. In her preliminary statement, she accused the victim's son: 23-year-old José Váquez-Varela Borcino, known by the nicknames Varelita and El Pollo Varela. (Note: English: The young lad Varela) He was a suspicious character, a bohemian who lived a disorderly life and who had a bad reputation due to the company he kept. Neighbors claimed they often heard violent arguments between him and the widow Varela because she refused to give him money. However, he had spent the evening before the crime in the Cárcel Modelo prison due to having stolen a cloak. This was his third stint in this prison—the first time, for having beaten his mother, Luciana; the second, for stabbing his lover, Dolores Gutiérrez Robles, known as Lola la Billetera, (Note: English: Lola, the lottery saleswoman) since she sold lottery tickets on the corner of Alcalá and Sevilla streets. Despite Varela being in prison at the time of Luciana's murder, the housemaid Higinia insisted on her account of the facts. According to her, Pollo Varela had threatened and coerced her with force, even offering her money, and thus she had gone to buy the oil, had cleaned up the blood after the murder, burnt the body, and closed the door after her. She claimed that she had fainted after the crime due to the psychological stress she had been under. Higinia's illogical and changing statements would soon raise the suspicions of the police about her and her environment. During the statements, another name was mentioned as potentially being involved, that of Lola la Billetera who, apart from being Pollo Varela's lover, was a close friend of Higinia. Other sources, such as Pérez-Galdós himself and various journalists and historians, have referred to her by the name Dolores Ávila.

== Impact on Madrid and Spanish society ==
From the very beginning, Madrid's El Liberal and other newspapers rushed to inform Spanish society about the crime. Por primera vez hay un juicio paralelo, en el que la prensa se alimenta de la calle y la calle de la prensa, (Note: English: "For the first time, there is a parallel trial, in which the press feeds off from the word on the streets, and the streets feed off the press.") explains María Jesús Ruiz, a professor and researcher at the University of Cádiz.

It had elements that soon aroused the morbid curiosity of Madrid inhabitants: a presumably wealthy and somewhat rude victim, a son with legal troubles, and a housemaid who had been working at her mistress's house for the last six months only. Madrid society discussed the incident around the city's coffeehouses—such as Café Gijón and Café de las Salesas—and tertulias, and two opposing sides started to appear. On one side, the Higinistas, who defended the housemaid and opposed Varela, considering him the suspect; on the other, the Varelistas, supporters of Varela who considered Higinia Balaguer Ostalé the suspect instead.

For the coffeehouse habitués, the housemaid Higinia represented the helplessness of the proletariat; while José Vázquez Varela was the image of a "young gentleman of leisure," spoiled, "characteristic of the bourgeoisie." The long process—which started on 26 March 1889 and ended on 25 May of that same year— heated up public opinion in Madrid and, by extension, in Spain.

== The trial ==
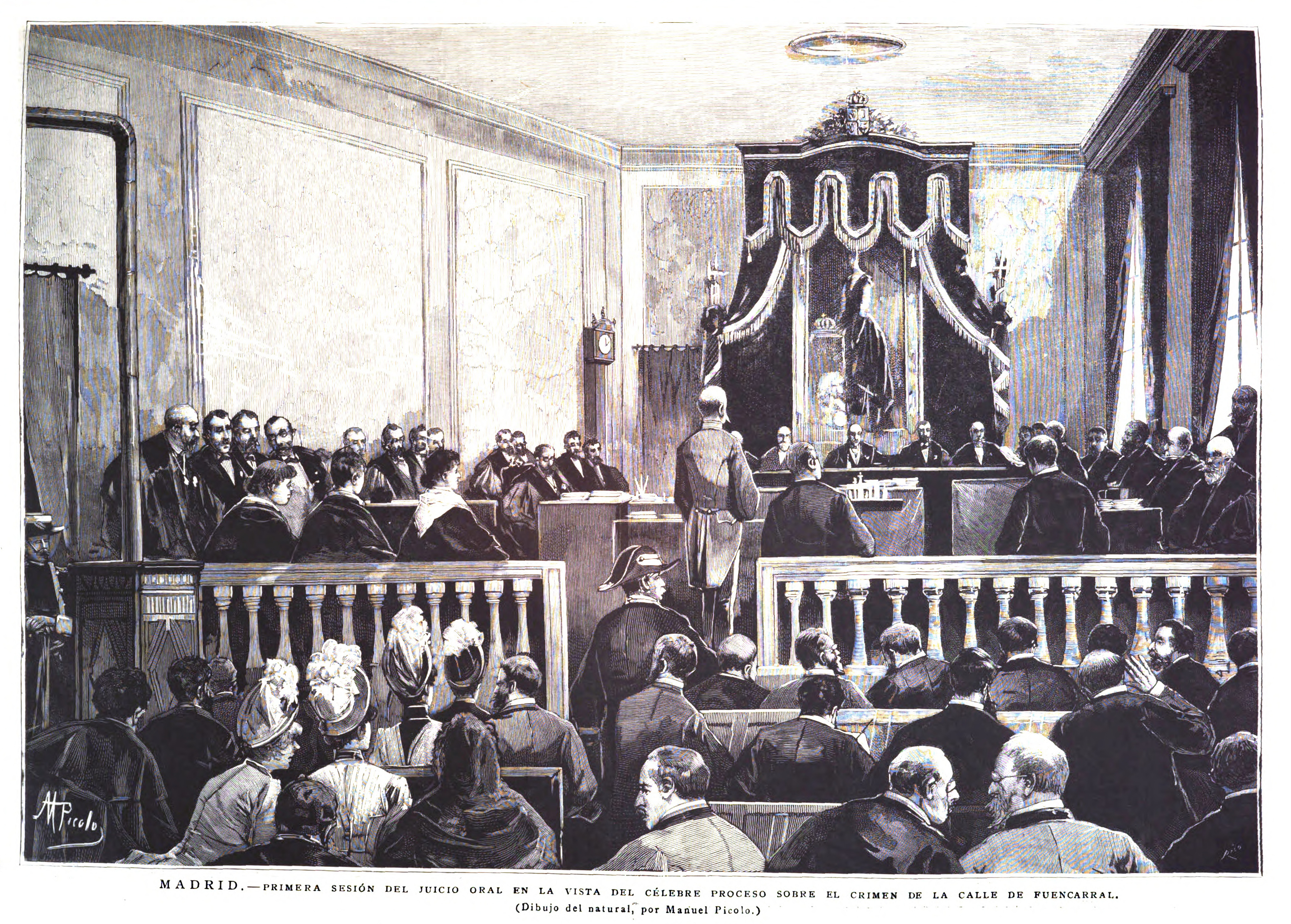
First session of the oral proceedings at the hearing (La Ilustración Española y Americana, 30 March 1889). Engraving based on a life drawing by Manuel Picolo.

The trial started on 26 March 1889 with the first session of the oral and public proceedings at the Palace of the Supreme Court in Madrid, eight months and 25 days after the crime was perpetrated. The defense attorney was former President Nicolás Salmerón. Due to the expectation to meet and see the defendants, people started queueing up at nine o’clock the previous evening to gain access to the Palace. Law enforcement officers tried to keep order among the throngs of people crowding the gates to be able to see the prisoner transport vehicle. The Court convened in the courtroom of the second section of the Palace of the Supreme Court. The first session began at one o’clock in the afternoon, at the cry of the bailiff on duty: ¡Vista de la causa seguida por homicidio, robo e incendio a Higinia Balaguer y otros! (Note: English: "Hearing in the case against Higinia Balaguer and others for homicide, robbery, and arson!")

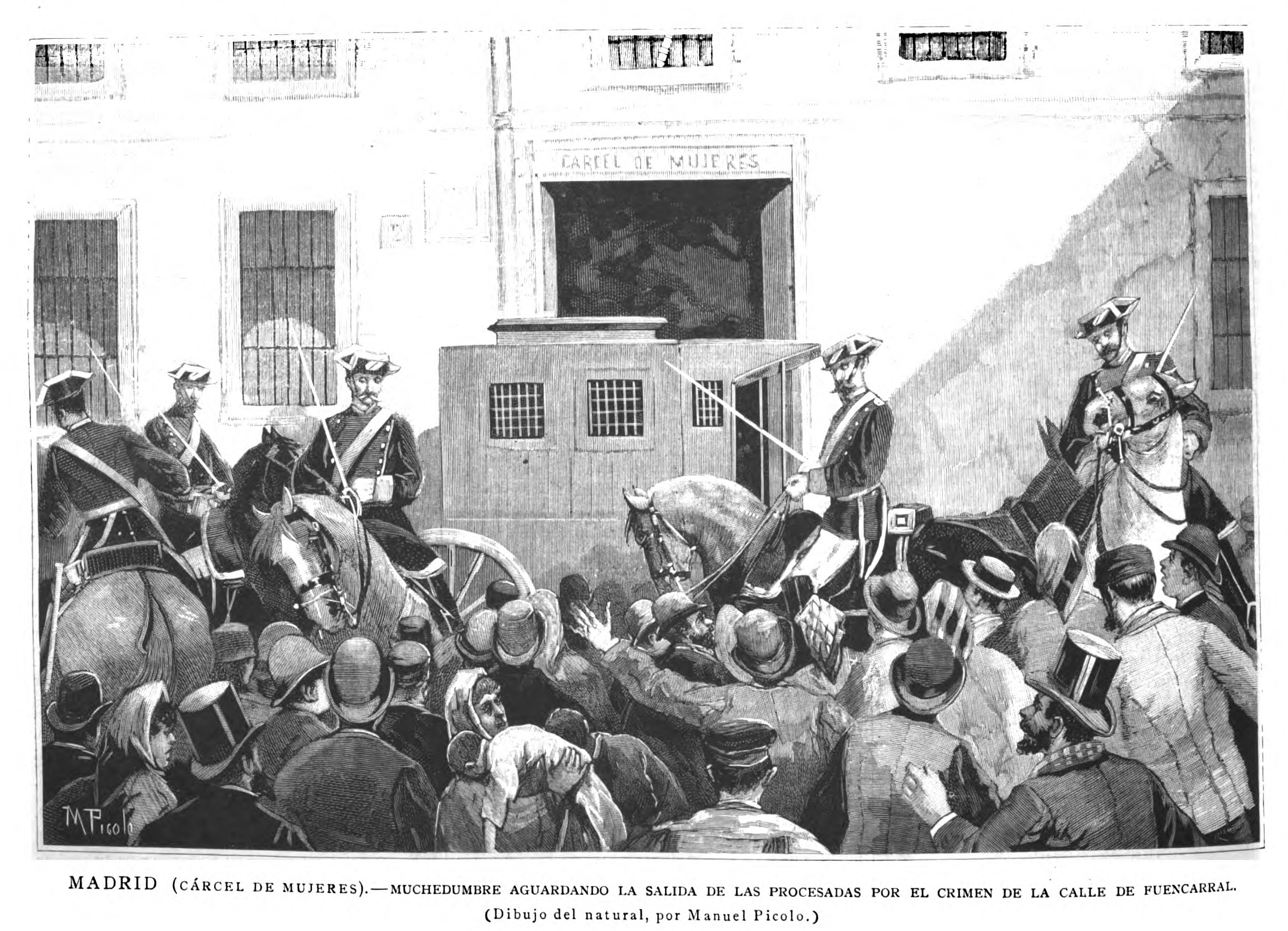
Crowd waiting for the defendants in the case of the crime of Fuencarral Street to exit the women's prison.

During the subsequent sessions, it was proven that Higinia Balaguer was planning on stealing from her mistress since the time she was hired six months before. Finally, during the first sessions, Higinia confessed to having killed her mistress with a knife. She explained how, on the day of the murder, she had inadvertently broken a vase and that her mistress, who was very ill-tempered, had gotten very angry with her. Thus, Higinia, flustered and nervous, had killed her.

During the fourth session, the jury uncovered a connection between Higinia Balaguer and José Millán Astray (interim director of the Cárcel Modelo in which José Varela was imprisoned) and established that they knew each other because of the relationship between Higinia and Evaristo Abad Mayoral (also known as El cojo Mayoral (Note: English: Lame Mayoral)), who had a bar in front of the Cárcel Modelo. José Millán Astray was the father of José Millán-Astray y Terreros (el glorioso mutilado (Note: English: The glorious amputee)), who would go on to found the Spanish Legion. Higinia had previously worked for Millán-Astray and he had even recommended her to Luciana to work as her housemaid. It was inferred that Pollo Varela could come and go from prison as he pleased and that compromised José Millán. This discovery complicated the case. Subsequent statements established some degree of friendship between Higinia and Varela. It was proven that the dog was poisoned with an anesthetic. The investigation found that Higinia could have had help from one or two people to perpetrate the murder.

== The court ruling ==
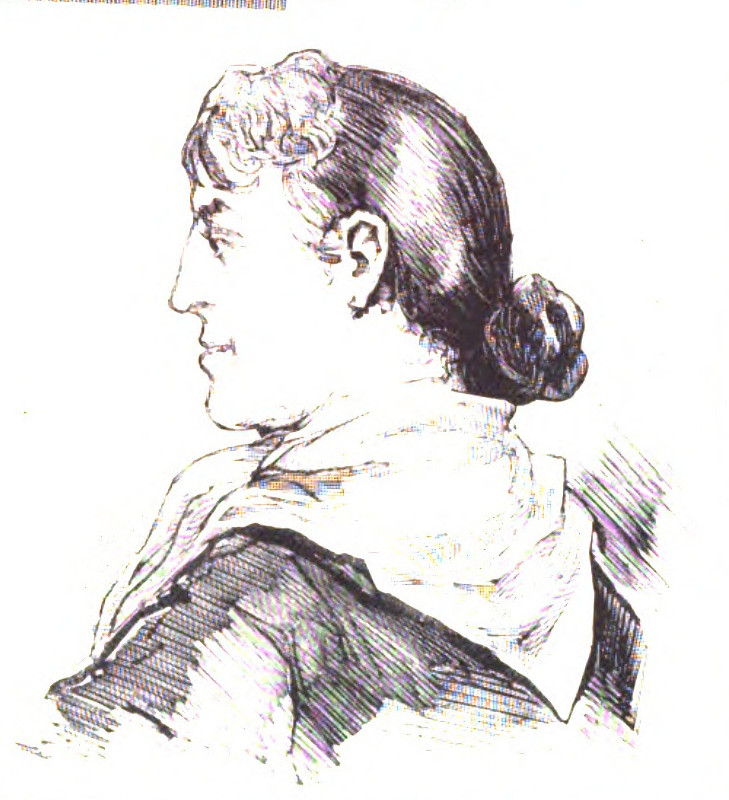
Higinia Balaguer, sentenced to death for the homicide.

The court gave its ruling on 25 May, sentencing Higinia to the death penalty: (...) condenamos a la procesada Higinia de Balaguer Ostalé, por delito complejo de robo y homicidio, a la pena de muerte (...). (Note: English: "(...) we sentence defendant Higinia de Balaguer Ostalé to the death penalty for the multiple offense of robbery and homicide (…)") The ruling sentenced her friend Dolores Ávila as an accomplice to 18 years in prison, and acquitted defendants José Vázquez-Varela Borcino and José Millán Astray, as well as María Ávila Palacios.

Higinia was executed by garrote vil on Saturday 19 July 1890. She was 30 years old. Around 20,000 people were present at the execution. In the moments before her death, Higinia yelled ¡Dolores, catorce mil duros! (Note: English: "Dolores, 14,000 duros!" (duro: a nickname for the five peseta coin)) Even today, no one has been able to interpret the meaning of this phrase. There are those who maintain that the sentence was really the result of a certain social resentment by the bourgeoisie against a housemaid than of a true will to shed light on the facts, and that Varela escaped punishment for his actions.

Years later, Pollo Varela was involved in another death under suspicious circumstances, this time related to a prostitute who fell from a high floor on Calle de la Montera. He did not escape this time and was found guilty and sentenced by a court. He spent 14 years in prison at the Fortress of Monte Hacho in Monte Hacho, Ceuta. When he got out of jail, he set up a photography studio that had some success. He had learned the techniques during his prison stay.

== Galdós's version ==
Based on volumes VI and VII of Cronicón (1886-1890), Obras Inéditas de Benito Pérez Galdós published by Argentine writer Alberto Ghiraldo in 1923, Spanish novelist Rafael Reig prefaced the 2002 edition of El crimen de la calle Fuencarral from the collection of chronicles sent by Pérez Galdós to Argentine newspaper La Prensa. According to Reig, these were comparable to the style of Dashiell Hammett and showed how Galdós led the way for the detective genre that had barely been explored in Spanish literature up until then:

Hoy en día, cuando la literatura criminal parece haber descrito un círculo (probablemente vicioso), resulta refrescante esta miniatura galdosiana en la que Higinia mata por catorce mil duros, con un cuchillo de cocina y ayudada por su "compinche". En estos tiempos de asesinos psicópatas, a lo Hannibal Lecter, que matan por las más enrevesadas razones psicológicas; o bien ahijados de Fu Manchú, que conspiran en la sombra y utilizan, pongamos, aceleradores de partículas ionizadas o cepas de virus experimentales inyectadas con jeringuilla, resulta bastante saludable reencontrarse con criminales que no oyen voces interiores ni pretenden el control absoluto del planeta, que no tienen un cociente intelectual extraordinario ni habilidades circenses y tecnologías vanguardistas: vecinos de enfrente, seres humanos como la Higinia de Galdós, que había vivido "maritalmente con un lisiado", mataba por codicia rudimentaria y era "un monstruo de astucia y marrullería". Es Dashiell Hammett en versión Chamberí.

— (from the preface by Rafael Reig) (Note: English: "Today, when crime literature seems to have described a (probably vicious) circle, it is refreshing to see Galdós’s miniature version [of El Crimen de la calle de Fuencarral], in which Higinia kills for 14,000 duros, with a kitchen knife and with help from her 'partner in crime.' In this era of psychotic killers, á la Hannibal Lecter, who kill for the most twisted reasons; or of protégés of Fu Manchu, who conspire in the shadows and use, let’s say, ionized particle accelerators or strains of experimental viruses injected via syringe, it is quite healthy to meet again criminals who do not hear voices in their head or seek to gain absolute control of the planet, who do not have an extraordinary intelligence quotient or circus skills and avant-garde technologies: guy-next-door types, human beings such as Galdós's Higinia, who had lived 'in marital cohabitation with a cripple,' killed out of plain old greed, and was 'an astute and cunning monster.' It is Dashiell Hammett in a Chamberí version.")

== In popular culture ==
- In 1946, Edgar Neville wrote and directed El crimen de la calle de Bordadores (The Crime of Bordadores Street) and he based the screenplay on this case.
- In 1985, an adaptation was made for television titled El crimen de la calle Fuencarral, directed by Angelino Fons, produced by Pedro Costa Musté, and scripted by Carlos Pérez Merinero, which aired as an episode of the series La huella del crimen. The role of Higinia was played by Carmen Maura.

== See also ==
- The Crime of Bordadores Street
- La huella del crimen
- Benito Pérez Galdós
- Andalusian Mail Train Robbery

== Bibliography ==
- Gómez, Concha; Sánchez-Mesa, Domingo (2011). "La crónica de sucesos criminales en el relato periodístico y el cinematográfico: el viaje de Edgar Neville entre la calle Fuencarral y Bordadores" (PDF). Signa: revista de la Asociación Española de Semiótica (in Spanish). No. 20. Alicante, Spain: Miguel de Cervantes Virtual Library. pp. 277–304.
- Hernández Castanedo, Francisco (2007). El Madrid tremebundo (in Spanish). Madrid, Spain: Ediciones La Librería. ISBN 9788496470675.
- Morte Landa, Cristina (2018). El crimen de la calle Fuencarral como hito en la historia del periodismo en España. Análisis de su tratamiento en el diario El Imparcial (Degree in journalism thesis) (in Spanish). Zaragoza, Spain: University of Zaragoza.
- Pérez Galdós, Benito (2019) [1924, Editorial Renacimiento]. "El crimen de la calle de Fuencarral". In Ghiraldo, Alberto (ed.). Cronicón (1886-1890), Obras Inéditas (PDF) (in Spanish). Vol. VII. Madrid, Spain: Miguel de Cervantes Virtual Library. pp. 87–145.
- Pérez Galdós, Benito (2002). "Rafael Reig". El crimen de la calle de Fuencarral (in Spanish). Madrid, Spain: Editorial Lengua de Trapo. ISBN 978-84-96080-01-0.
