= Café Gijón =

Cafe in Spain

Coordinates: 40°25′20.35″N 3°41′32.09″W

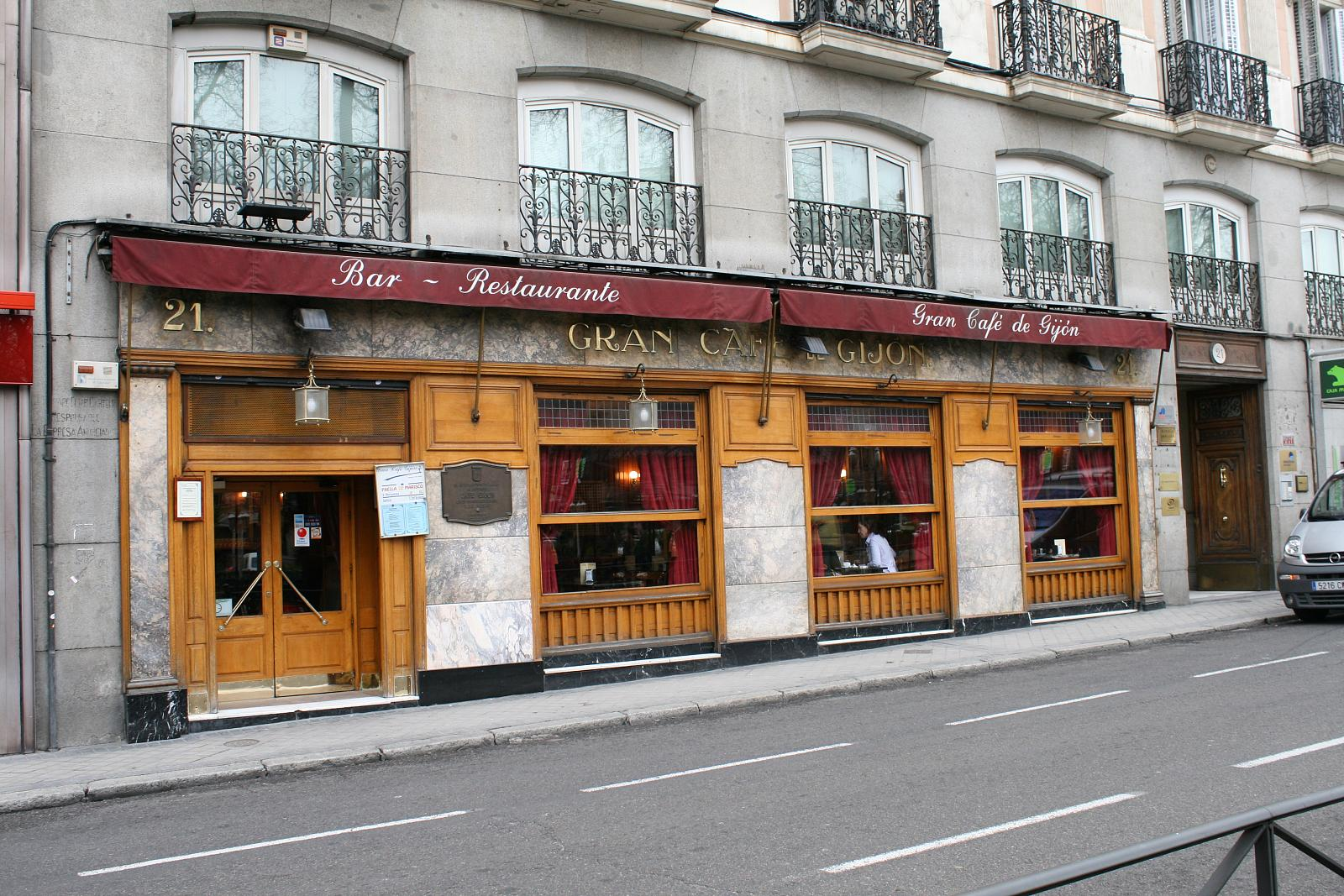
Exterior wood façade of Café Gijón

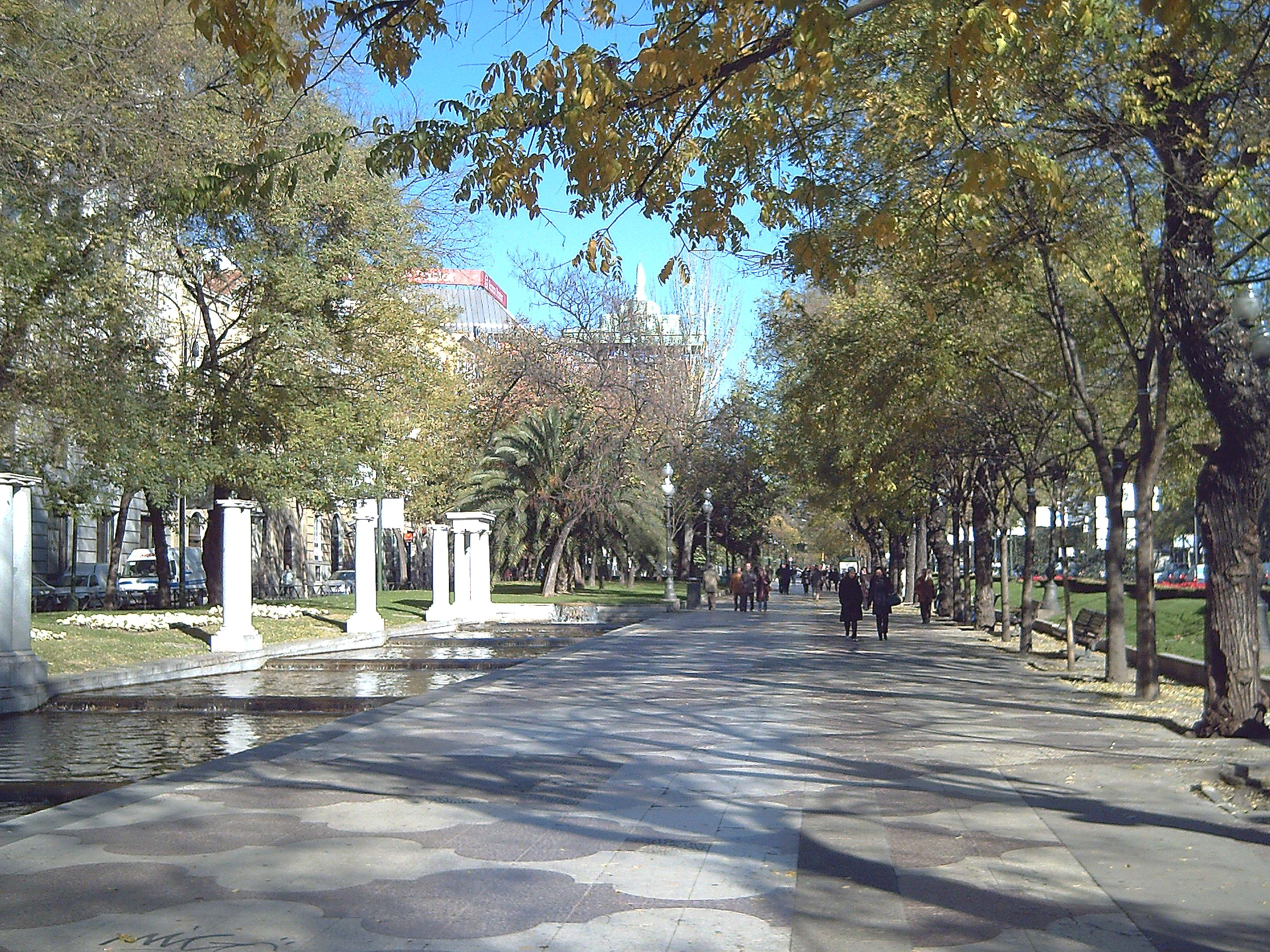
Paseo de Recoletos, The café is on the left

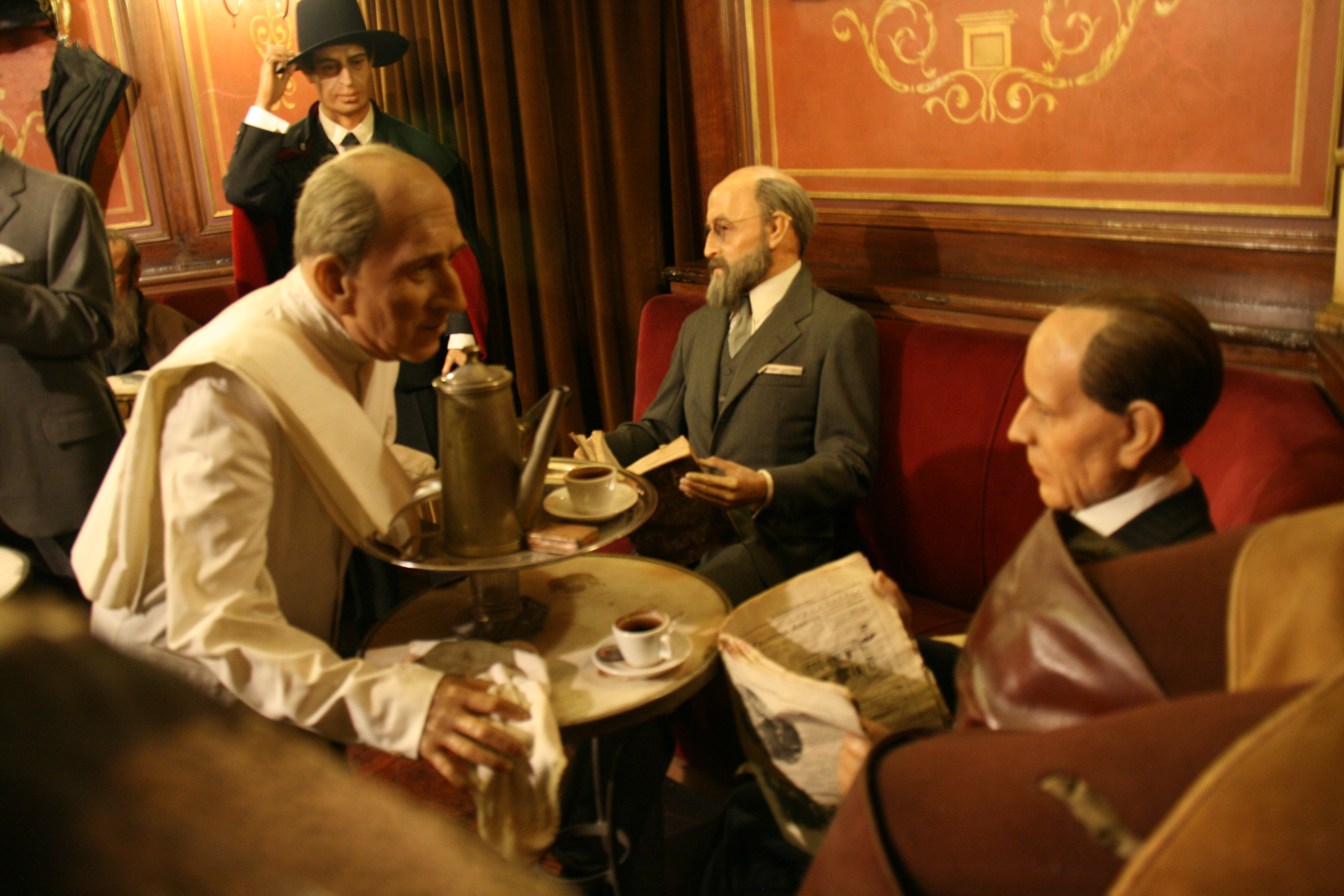
A scene from the café on display in the nearby wax museum

Café Gijón (Also known as Gran Café de Gijón) is a culturally significant coffeehouse situated at No. 21, in the boulevard of central Madrid, Spain, which is known as Paseo de Recoletos. The café is opposite both a railway station of the same name and the National Library of Spain (BNE). The terrace in front is on the central walkway of the Paseo.

== History ==
It was established on 15 May 1888 by Gumersindo Gómez (possibly Gunmersindo García).

Despite modest beginnings, after the Spanish Civil War it became a meeting-place for intellectuals, writers and artists collectively known as Generation of '36. It was also known by Hollywood stars and foreign writers such as Ava Gardner, Orson Welles, Joseph Cotten, George Sanders, and Truman Capote.

In December 2013, the cafe experienced a robbery.

== Tertulias ==
These were some of the more famous regular meetings or tertulias held at the café:

- Tertulia de los poetas: a poets' corner led by Gerardo Diego.
- Juventud Creadora (Creative Youth): also known as Garcilasismo, one of the main currents of Spanish post-civil-war poetry.
- Tertulia de escritores y lectores: led by the Ateneo de Madrid, a private cultural institution promoting scientific, literary, and artistic talent, and loosely associated with the Institución Libre de Enseñanza movement which created the nearby Residencia de Estudiantes.
- Discussions about the trial for the crime of Fuencarral street, in which a housemaid was accused and later convicted and sentenced to the death penalty for killing her mistress, a wealthy widow from Madrid society.

== Famous Patrons ==
- Carlos Oroza
- Diego Medrano
- Francisco Umbral
- Juan Benet
- Eduardo Alfonso and Mario Rosso, founders of the Schola Philosophicae Initiationis
- Ramón María del Valle-Inclán
- Antonio Paso
- Alfonso Paso
- Antonio Buero Vallejo
- Antonio Gala
- Camilo José Cela
- Carlos Oroza
- Enrique Jardiel Poncela
- Fernando Fernán Gómez
- Gerardo Diego
- Juan José Cuadros Pérez
- Gloria Fuertes
- Ignacio Sánchez Mejías
- José Canalejas
- José Suárez Carreño
- Juan García Hortelano
- Santiago Ramón y Cajal
- Benito Pérez Galdós
- Modesto Ciruelos
- Dionisio Ridruejo
- José García Nieto
- Salvador Videgain García
- Manuel Alexandre
- Álvaro de Luna
- José Manuel Cervino
- Juan Van Halen
- Marino Gómez Santos
- José Luis Prado Nogueira
- Luis López Anglada
- Leopoldo de Luis
- Luis García Berlanga
- Arturo Pérez-Reverte

== Café Gijón Prize ==
El Premio Café Gijón is an annual Spanish literary award for an outstanding novel. The idea, conceived in 1949 by Fernando Fernán Gómez, Gerardo Diego, Camilo José Cela, Enrique Jardiel Poncela and other leaders of the Tertulias was to promote those meetings and to create an independent prize to compete with Nadal Prize, which was organised by commercial publishers.

Although the award was originally managed by the Café Gijón, and is now financed by the tourism agency of the northern port city of Gijón in Asturias, it is only concerned with the spread of quality literature and the promotion of authors whose work may not otherwise be published for lack of funds. Although winners receive no financial prize, the award attracts considerable media attention which promotes both the winning authors and of course the sponsors of the prize.

== See also ==
- Café de las Salesas
- Café Comercial
- Tertulia
