= Andalusian Mail Train Robbery =

1924 train robbery and murders in Spain

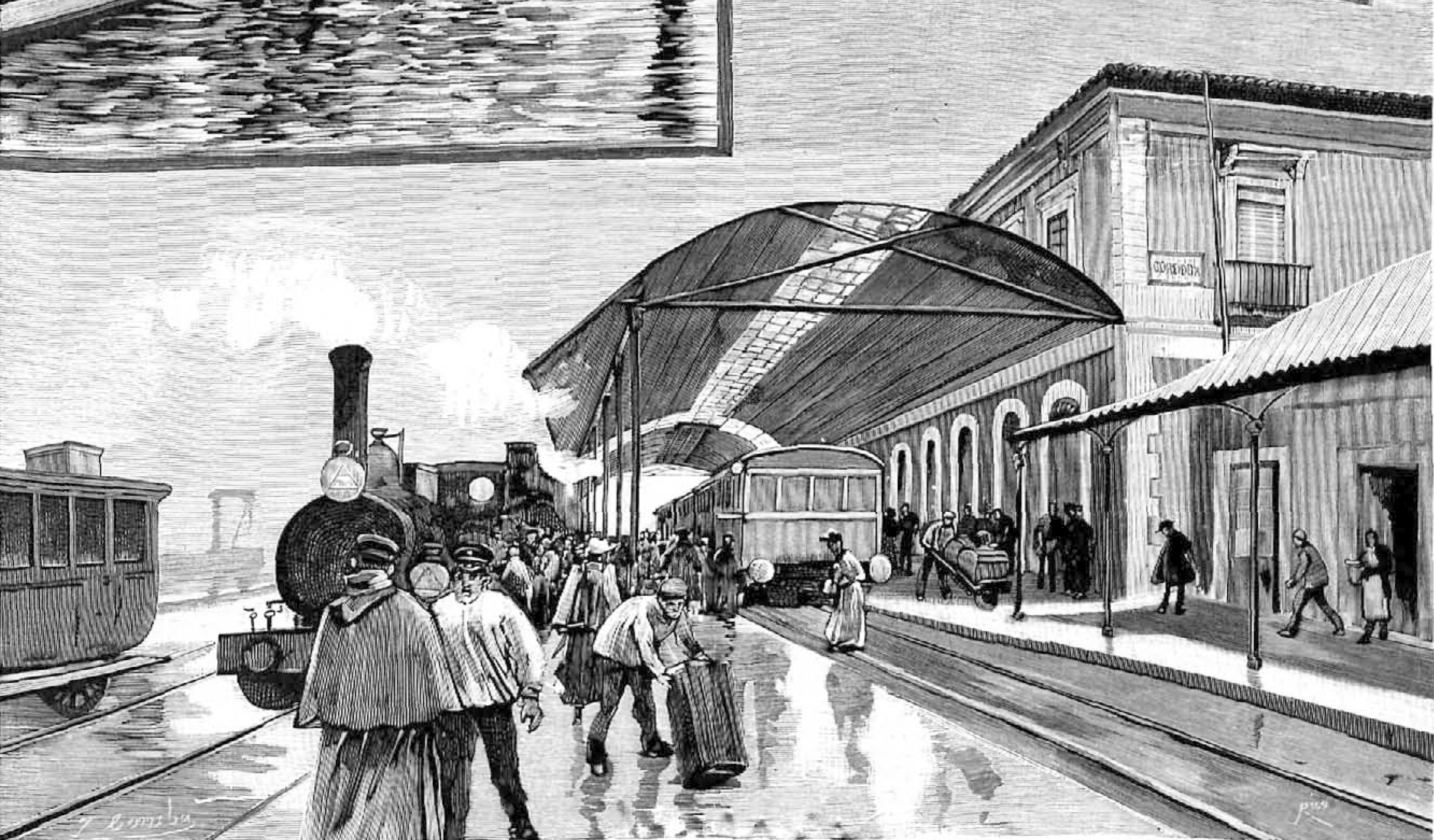
Illustration that appeared in weekly magazine La Ilustración Española y Americana (1892), which shows the Estación Central station in Córdoba before the arrival of a train from Madrid.

The Andalusian mail train robbery, also known as the crime on the Andalusian express, consisted of a robbery and murder that took place on 11 April 1924 (Note: It was Good Friday, in the early years of the Dictatorship of Primo de Rivera.) on board the train leaving Madrid at twenty past eight o'clock in the evening. There were two victims in total, 30-year-old Ángel Ors (Note: Some sources spell his last name as Orts.) Pérez and 45-year-old Santos Lozano León, both of whom were traveling post officers. (Note: Ambulantes: Post office workers who were in charge of receiving, classifying, and delivering mail along a scheduled route.) The murders were carried out by means of a firearm and blows dealt with ticket punch pliers.

The case ended when Antonio Teruel, one of the perpetrators, committed suicide by a shot to the head before being arrested, and with José María Sánchez Navarrete, Francisco de Dios Piqueras, and Honorio Sánchez Molina executed by garrote vil on 9 May 1924. In addition, José Donday was sentenced to 20 years in prison. All of them had been found guilty of the crime.

== Background ==
The train in question was carrying the wages from various chartered companies to their employees, as well as mail from all over Europe to be distributed through North Africa and Gibraltar. It was traveling along the Madrid-Córdoba route, having left the Madrid Atocha railway station at 8:20 in the evening, to arrive in Córdoba at seven in the morning.

== The planning of the crime ==
The main perpetrators of the crime were:

- José María Sánchez Navarrete, the main instigator. He was the son of a lieutenant colonel of the Civil Guard and had previously worked for the post office. At the time of the incident, he was known to be unemployed and fond of gambling, and thus was deeply in debt. He was also addicted to cocaine.
- Cuban drug addict José Donday, also known as Pildorita, who was in a same-sex relationship with Sánchez Navarrete, whom he had met at a bar. Both would devise a plan to hold up the Andalusian mail train as a way to get easy money and pay off debts. Sánchez Navarrete had spoken of a loot of around one million pesetas. (Note: Approximately, 2.56 million euros in 2022)
- Honorio Sánchez Molina, the mastermind and financial backer of the operation, a low-life character who was the owner of a boarding house in Madrid on Calle de las Infantas, and who also had a gambling problem.
- Antonio Teruel López, aso known as el Albañil, who was having big financial problems. He was brought in by Sánchez Molina.
- Francisco de Dios Piqueras, also known as Paco, el Fonda, another low-life character who also had gambling debts. He was brought in by Teruel López.

Once the gang was assembled, Sánchez Navarrete got in contact with Ángel Ors, who was an employee of the express train company and whom Sánchez Navarrete had met during his time working for the railroad.

The plan was that the gang would board the train in Aranjuez, taking advantage of the friendship between Sánchez Navarrete and Ors so the latter would let them in the mail car. Donday would be in charge of getting wine spiked with a narcotic drug (Pantopon) with which to put the two postal employees—Ors and Lozano, both of whom were on patrol that night—to sleep. Moreover, Donday was also in charge of planning an escape route.

Molina did not fully participate in the perpetration of the crime, claiming he had work matters beyond his control that he had to attend to. Therefore, he would be waiting in Madrid for the group to arrive at their destination.

== The robbery ==
The heist did not go as planned. Donday had taken the money he had been given to buy the wine and narcotics, spent it on gambling bets the evening before the heist, and lost everything. Therefore, he is believed to have given the gang cognac instead of wine, although other sources mention wine.

While the gang was boarding the train and getting ready for the heist, Donday had taken a taxicab to Alcázar de San Juan, and was waiting for them while having dinner.

Once inside the train, Sánchez Navarrete greeted Ors and Lozano and introduced Teruel and el Fonda as friends of his. He offered the two postal workers the alcohol he had brought, in the hope that they would fall unconscious, providing the criminals with the opportunity they needed. But this proved unsuccessful, and the intended victims did not fall unconscious, so Teruel and el Fonda lost their nerves and began to hit them with a pair of pliers. The first to die was Lozano, followed by Ors, who died after being shot in the chest by Teruel. The excuse both criminals gave Sánchez Navarrete was that they could not leave any witnesses.

Once the crime had been perpetrated, the criminals set out in search of the loot. However, it was nowhere near what Sánchez Navarrete had promised them. They hastily took some jewelry and money, and then got off the train at the Alcázar de San Juan station, where Donday was waiting for them with a taxicab and Miguel Pedrero, the driver. They went to Teruel's home, where they split the loot—40,000 pesetas. (Note: Around 100,000 euros in 2022.)

Meanwhile, the train continued on its way. When it arrived in the Andalusian capital at about six o'clock in the morning, the post office clerks approached the mail car to see what was going on and to collect the mailbags. But upon knocking at the door, they got no answer. The employees at the Córdoba station had been alerted by telegraph that something might have happened to Lozano and Ors, since the lights in the carriage had remained off when the train had passed through the previous stations and no one had answered the insistent calls. So, once they arrived at their destination, they had no choice but to force open the door, and thus found the bodies of the two workers.

=== The victims ===
The victims were traveling post officers:

- Santos Lozano León, 45 years old, married with five children; in charge of the Madrid-Cádiz line
- Ángel Ors Pérez, 30 years old, second officer, in charge of the Madrid-Málaga line

=== The crime scene ===
The bodies lay amid large pools of blood, bound with ropes and straps, and showing signs of a struggle. The packages and mail bags were scattered all over the train car, and the cash safe was open and empty. The doctors who examined the bodies concluded that the victims had died five hours before they were found.

On one hand, Lozano had a broken skull, which indicated that he did not know of the intention of his attackers until it was too late, when he suffered a blow to the head and was then strangled. However, Ors showed signs of having been involved in a violent struggle, which ended with him receiving three stab wounds and two gunshot wounds.

Both were buried in Córdoba, and their funerals were highly publicized and attended by large crowds.

== Arrests ==
The dictatorship of Miguel Primo de Rivera was in place at the time and he prided himself upon imposing law and order. Thus, the police wasted no time in finding the guilty parties, which was made easier thanks to the statements by the taxicab driver, Miguel Pedrero, apart from the numerous clues the criminals left at the scene and their behavior after the robbery. Pedrero said that on Friday evening, when the events took place, he was at the taxicab stand at Atocha station when a man asked him to take him to Aranjuez and then to continue to Alcázar with another man. Upon arriving in Aranjuez, the first man got off and soon returned with three others, whom he took to Madrid.The description he gave of one of the men fit that of Teruel. The police then learned that he had not been at home on Friday evening and that the night watchmen had seen him return early on Saturday morning.

Teruel's wife, Carmen Atienza, was the first person arrested. Meanwhile, feeling cornered, Teruel committed suicide by a gunshot to the head. Part of the stolen loot was found inside the metal posts of the bed he shared with his wife. Once arrested, Atienza provided information about her late husband's accomplices. Also arrested were Molina's sister, Antonia, and her laundress, Encarnación.

Sánchez Navarrete was the next one to be arrested, and he confessed to the crime. He was followed by Sánchez Molina and Piqueras, both of whom admitted to knowing Sánchez Navarrete.

The last one to be arrested was Pildorita, who had taken refuge in a farm located in Ciudad Real and then in Paris, but he later surrendered at the Spanish embassy there. The taxi driver would identify him as well.

== Trial and conviction ==
The trial was held on 7 and 8 May 1924. The judge in charge of the trial was Pérez del Rio, who soon recused himself so the trial could be held under military jurisdiction. The prosecution asked for the death penalty for the perpetrators of the crime and 30-year prison sentences for their accomplices. José Donday was the only one not sentenced to death but to 30 years in prison instead. Atienza was sentenced to eight years in prison.

Sánchez Navarrete, Sánchez Molina, and Piqueras were executed by garrote vil on 9 May 1924 at the Cárcel Modelo prison in Madrid.

Once the sentence had been served, at six o'clock in the morning, a black flag was raised outside the prison to announce the death of the criminals.

== In popular culture ==
The case had quite an impact on popular culture at the time, inspiring ballads, films, television series, and books.

=== Film ===
- Al margen de la ley, directed by Ignacio F. Iquino, was released in 1936. It starred Rosita de Cabo, Frank Cabullana, Assumpció Casals, Samuel S. Crespo, Juan de Landa, Juan Faidellá, Federico Gandía, Gastón A. Mantua, Paco Martínez Soria, and Antonio Pacheco.
- El expreso de Andalucía (Andalusia Express) by director Francisco Rovira Beleta was released in 1956. It starred Jorge Mistral, Marisa de Leza, and Mara Berni.

=== Television ===
The case was adapted to television in 1991 as an episode of Spanish true crime anthology series La huella del crimen. The episode was directed by Imanol Uribe and starred Tito Valverde, Enrique San Francisco, José Manuel Cervino, Mario Pardo, Francisco Casares, Kiti Mánver, Maite Blasco, Asunción Balaguer, and Claudio Rodríguez. The screenplay was written by Pedro Costa Musté and the script was adapted by Luis Ariño and Ricardo Franco, with music by Bernardo Bonezzi, and cinematography by Hans Burmann.

=== Literature ===
- Ernesto de Guzmán wrote the novella El crimen del expreso de Andalucía, published by Gráficas Clemares (Madrid, 1950).
- One chapter of the book En la escena del crimen. Dos siglos de crónica negra en España by Eladio Romero García and Alberto de Frutos Dávalos deals with the case.

== See also ==
- Crime of Fuencarral street
- La huella del crimen
