= Carlos Oroza =

Spanish poet (1923–2015)

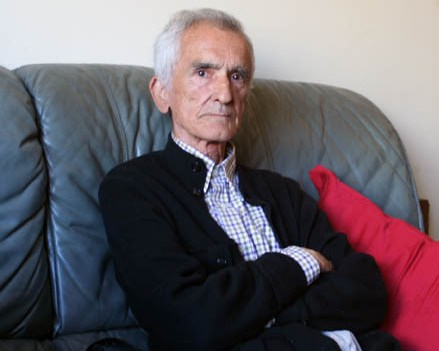
- Born: 13 May 1923; Viveiro, Galicia
- Died: 20 November 2015 (aged 92); Madrid, Spain
- Occupations: Poet, performer
- Writing career
- Pen name: The Wicked

Carlos Oroza (13 May 1923 – 20 November 2015) was a Spanish poet.

== Style ==
He is known mainly for the interpretation and performance of his own work. His work is composed of free verses with rhythm.

In the 1960s when he was living in Madrid, he became known in the literary-poetic environment of the Café Gijón, oasis of national coexistence, culture and contra cultural movements during Franco’s dictatorship.

At that time he founded, along with Victor Lizarraga and Victoria Paniagua, the Tropos magazine and participated in jazz-poetry recitals.

He was living in Madrid, Ibiza and the U.S., where he was awarded with the International Underground Poetry award of New York and, incognito, he came back to his own land in 1985.

Oroza’s poetry is often considered in form and content attached to the Beat Generation though he never belonged to any movement.

Carlos Oroza, acratic and poet, walks by Vigo like a walking contraculture symbol. 'What strange beings... those who are normal!', he reflects aloud. Oroza has been living in Vigo for more than a pair of decades, after discovering the light of the city and deciding to include Vigo in his permanent vital exodus.

He follows single and free to the last signs of consumism. He says that he lives as a poet: 'I believe in the world like a paradise, not like a sacrifice'.

Oroza is popular in the literary circles in spite of his isolation. Marginal People, rock’s people, who do not really read poetry habitually used to go to his recitals. About his mystical performances two things: 'Words dream I name them', 'Poetry is singing more than any other thing and, those who listen to it, find the scent of the tribe'. He said too that his work 'is the one of a Nordic poet, that covets the distant thing, the light. Not only the light of the sun, but also the light of thinking'.

A time ago, Oroza appeared between the eight last Bohemian writers of Spain, but in his opinion this is 'pure literature'.

In 2008, the Spanish ex-Minister of Culture, Cesar Antonio Molina (es:César Antonio Molina), who was also the director of Cervantes Institute and responsible for delivering the Laxeiro (es:Laxeiro) Award 2008 which grants the Foundation Laxeiro to the poet. Cesar Antonio Molina, who is also a writer and an admirer of the work of the poet, was moreover responsible for writing the prologue of the book En el norte hay un mar que es más alto que el cielo. According to Cesar Antonio Molina 'nobody knows Oroza's address because that would be like knowing the whereabouts of the wind or of the breeze'.

== Work ==
=== Published poems ===
- Elencar, (1974) ISBN 84-400-8083-2
- Cabalum, (1980) (Ediciós do Castro)
- Alicia, (1985)
- Una porción de tierra gris del norte, (1996)
- La llama prestada, (1998)
- En el norte hay un mar que es más alto que el cielo, first edition 1997, reviewed and expanded in 2005, 3º edition 2008 (Deputación de Pontevedra).

ISBN 84-8457-245-5

- Un sentimiento ingrávido recorre el ambiente, (2006), Raiña Lupa y Yves Rivière

=== Video poems ===
Caballum (April 2002) RTVG Production

Elencar (2008)

== Honours and awards ==
New York Underground Poetry award

Fundación Laxeiro Award 2008

== Miscellany ==
His recently lost friend, Francisco Umbral said that 'Oroza is the only one who has returned Poetry to its sacred and violent origin. He was the wicked poet of the Café Gijón in Madrid, the Bohemian of the 1960s, the man who rose against Vietnam's War, short books and snobs with espadrille panties. He had a profile of Cesar Vallejo and another one of Dante Alighieri. Today already we know that, with his wordish and unique poetry, he has stayed as a slippery myth of 1968'. Umbral still remembered Oroza’s facet of 'a malicious and inspired ácrata (es:ácrata) when the Café Gijón 'was his trench' and 'he lived single, he slept in a crunchy newspapers bed and took his poems a walk by the Great Gran Via'.

According to Umbral Oroza is 'an anticlassic one', 'a great poet who has saved himself from the official poetry. And soon it is his prodigious way to say verses'. 'Oroza is the only one that has given back the poetry to its sacred and violent origin of creation, blasphemy, sonorous and scorching light, of male salmody and loose, single, lost, reflective word. A rapsodian, an aeda andean, but making chips the Greek lyre'.

== Books ==
- Carlos Oroza (2006). Raiña Lupa y Yves Rivière (ed.). Un sentimiento ingrávido recorre el ambiente. Archived from the original on 2011-07-06.
- Carlos Oroza (2005). Deputación de Pontevedra depontevedra.es (ed.). En el norte hay un mar que es más alto que el cielo. ISBN 84-8457-245-5.
- Carlos Oroza (1974). Tres.Catorce.Diecisite (ed.). Elencar. ISBN 84-400-8083-2.

== See also ==
- Café Gijón (Madrid)
