= Café Comercial =

Café in Madrid, Spain

Coordinates: 40°25′43.1″N 3°42′7.4″W

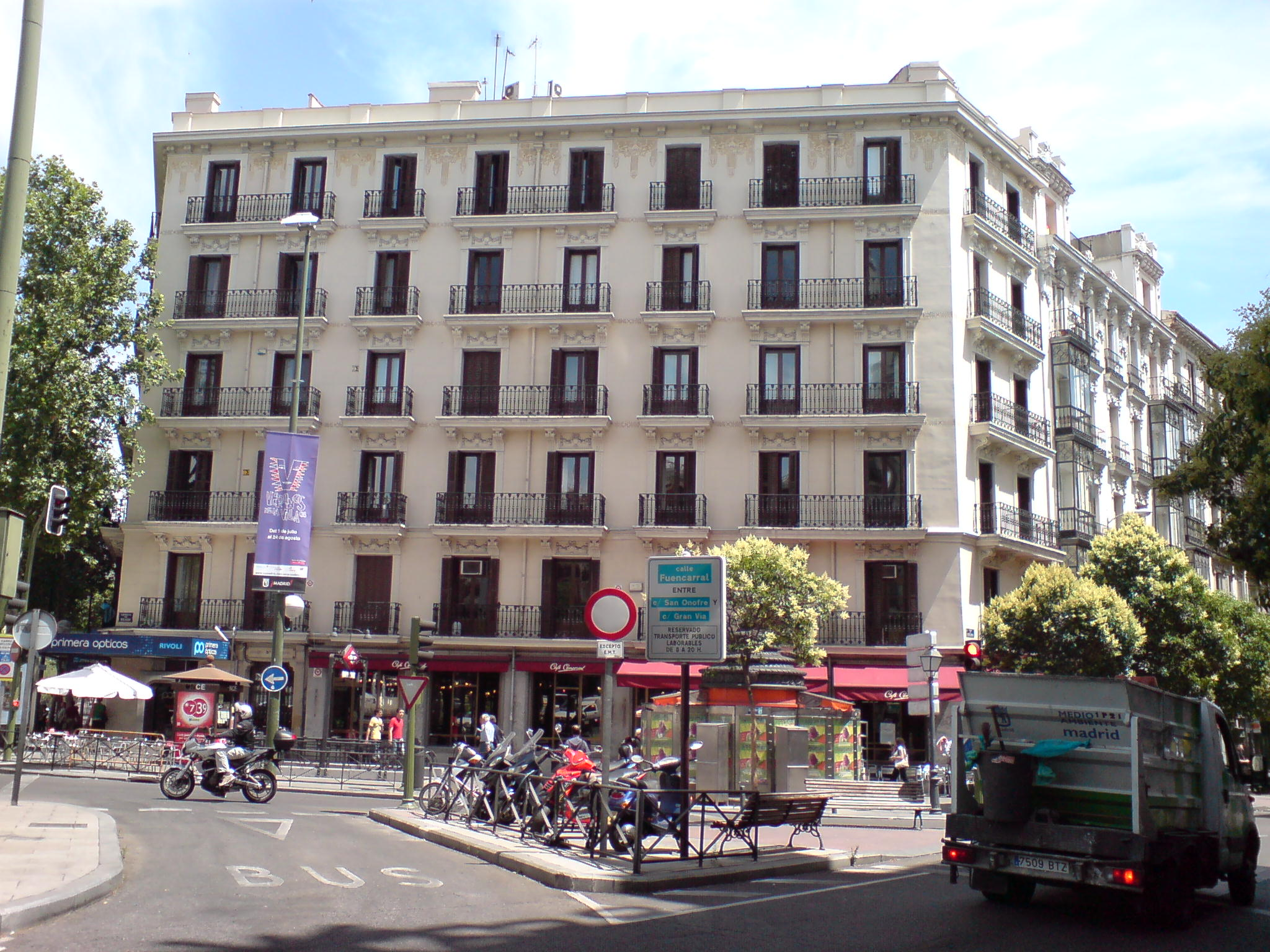
View of the building

The Café Comercial is a café located at the Glorieta de Bilbao in central Madrid, Spain. It is one of the city's oldest cafés, founded 21 March 1887 in the era of the Bourbon Restoration in Spain. It was a center for literary tertulias in the period following the Spanish Civil War. A remnant of Madrid's golden age, it was also one of the first Madrid cafés to employ women among those serving tables.

== Characteristics ==
The café has two entrances, one of them a revolving door facing onto the Glorieta de Bilbao. Large windows provide a view of the café from the street and vice versa. There are two floors; the upper floor is home to a chess club, the Club de Ajedrez Café Comercial, and chess boards are always available there. The café also has a full bar on each floor. The present configuration reflects a major remodel in 1953. The café is famous for its hot chocolate with churros and its picatostes (a type of fried bread).

== History ==
The Café Comercial first opened 21 March 1887, according to the license granted to Don Antonio Gómez Fernández. The Glorieta de Bilbao then had the famous Pozos de la Nieve which stored snow from the Sierra de Guadarrama on the property of Paulo Chaquías. The coffee served there was much praised at the time. Marcial Guareño composed a schottische whose lyrics ran, in part:

Quiere usted tomar	If you want to have
un café rico,	a rich coffee,
acuda al Comercial	go to the Comercial
que es exquisito	which is exquisite

Business meetings in that era gave the café its name. The café is strongly associated with the intellectual circles of Regenerationism who hoped to reform Spain after its 1898 defeat in the war versus the United States.

The café passed to the Contreras family in 1909 and continued as a famous Madrid institution. Don Antonio Contreras was a native of Havana. It is said that during the Spanish Civil War the café was taken over by its own employees. After the war, it was frequented by the journalists of Arriba, the official organ of the Movimiento Nacional and later of Francoist Spain.

== See also ==
- Café de las Salesas
- Café Gijón
