= Picatostes =

Slices of fried bread

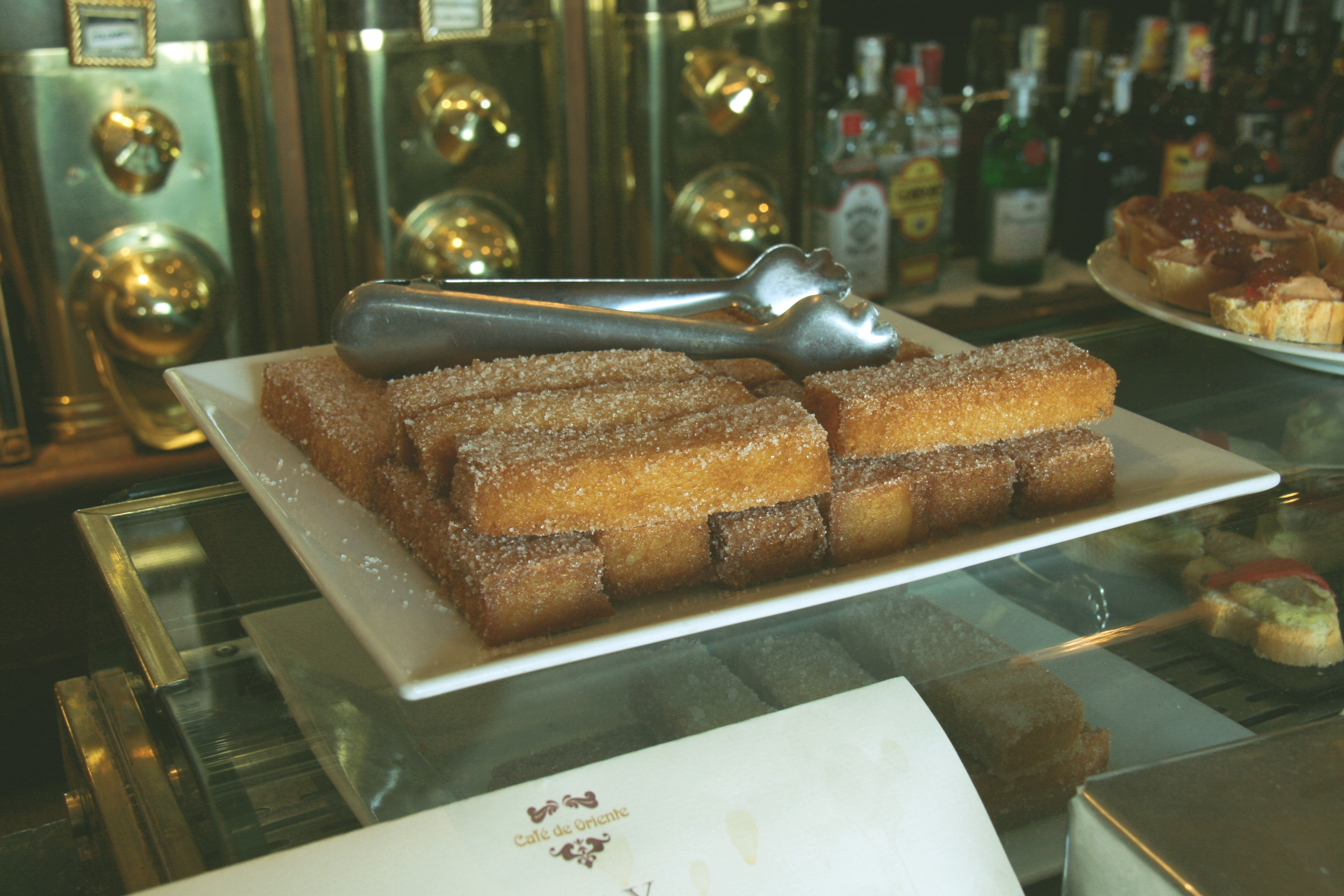
- A stack of picatostes at Café de Oriente in Madrid
- Type: Sweet bread
- Place of origin: Spain
- Region or state: Madrid

Picatostes are slices of fried bread, from loaves fried with lard or olive oil. They are typical of Madrid, Spain. They are usually sweetened with granules of refined sugar on the outside. They are most commonly eaten for breakfast or a quick lunch (merienda), accompanied by coffee. They are also sometimes eaten as a substitute for chocolate and churros (as a late night snack). They can be eaten hot or cold. As a cheap staple food, they are also a common accompaniment to beverages in the traditional cafés of Madrid where tertulias are held.

== Characteristics ==
Picatostes are rectangular slices of bread, cut from loaves and fried in lard or olive oil to the point of having a golden color and a crunchy crust. Typically, directly after frying they are dusted with refined sugar. Their shape is suitable for dipping in coffee or hot chocolate. A similar but more savory dish, torrijas, can be made by soaking the bread in a sauce before frying.

A 1933 reference work on the vocabulary of Andalusia (southern Spain) says that a picatoste is a slice of bread soaked in salt water, then fried. Some writers say that pica comes from picar ("to peck", "to bite", or "to burn") and refers to the stimulation of thirst.

== See also ==
- Crouton
