= Pulqueria =

Type of tavern in Mexico

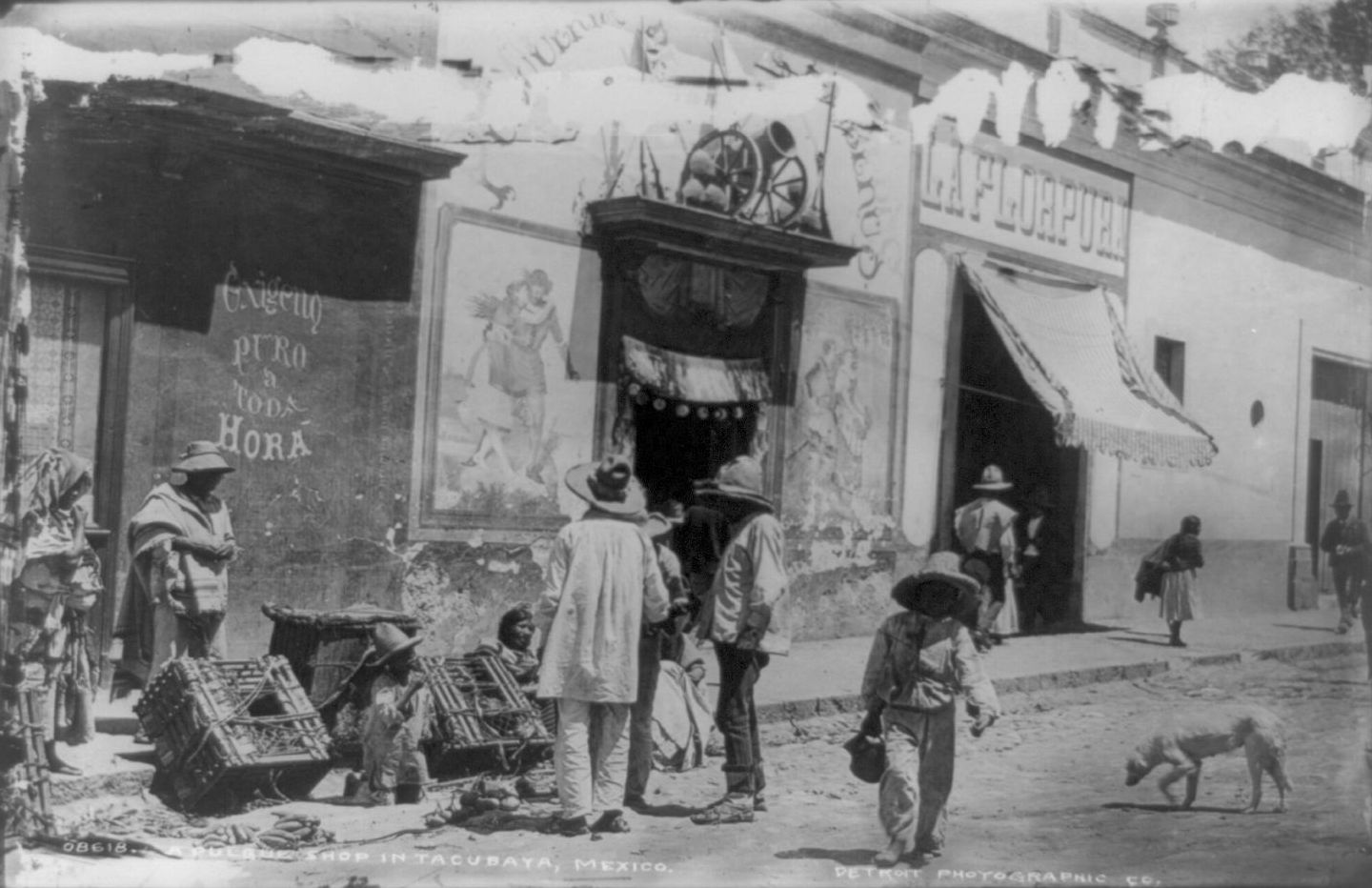
A pulqueria in Tacubaya, Mexico City, Mexico, circa 1884-1885

Pulquerías (or pulcherías) are a type of tavern in Mexico that specialize in serving an alcoholic beverage known as pulque. Established during early colonial rule, pulquerías remained popular venues for Mexican socializing until the mid-20th century. They were associated with extravagant decorations and names, social drinking, music, dancing, gambling, fighting, crime, and sexual promiscuity. Central to daily life and culture in Mexico, government authorities throughout history generally saw them as threats to the social order and the progress of the nation. Numerous restrictions were later put on pulquerías and the sale of pulque. Today, there are very few pulquerías left operating in Mexico.

== Pulque production ==
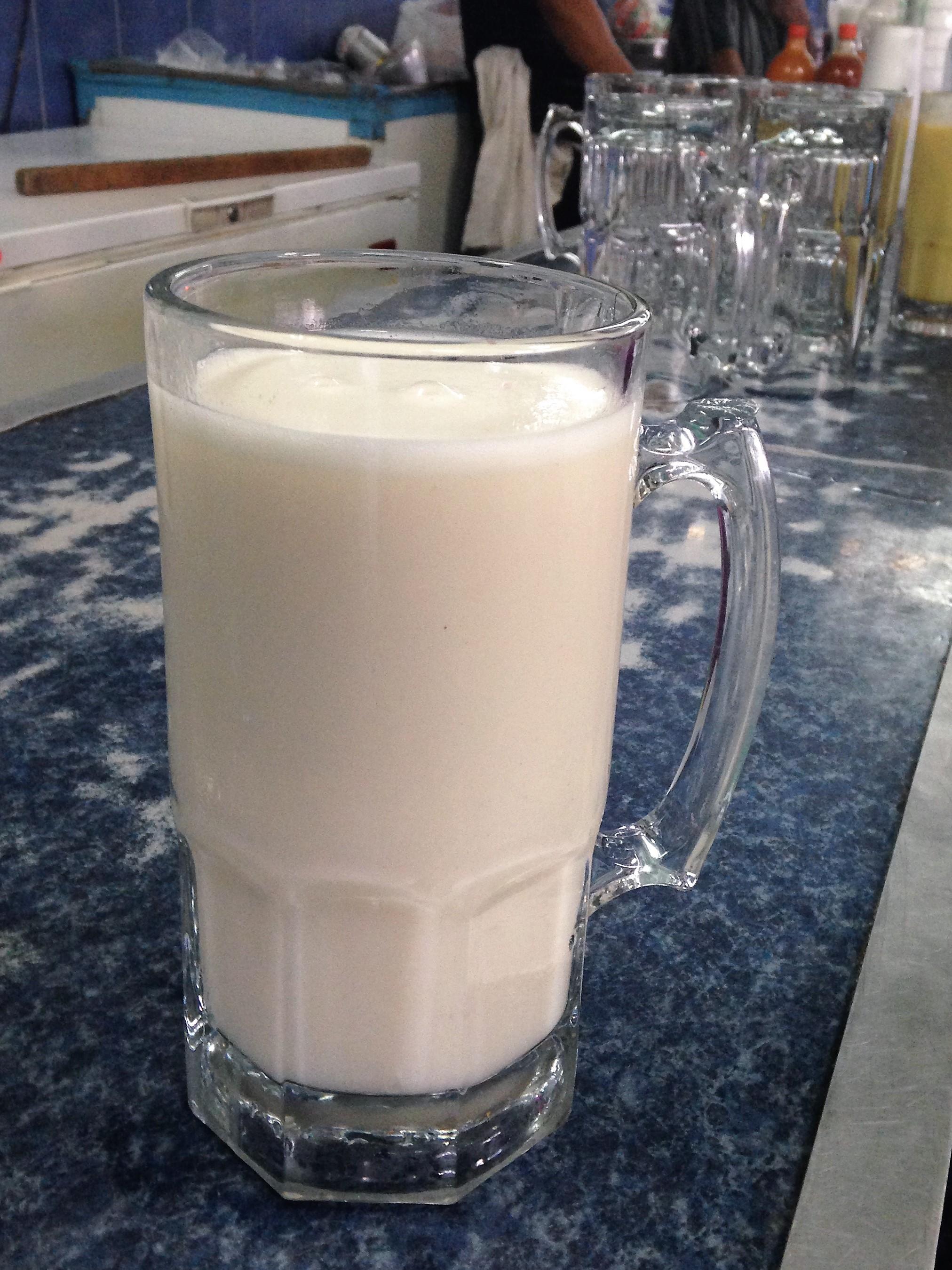
A liter glass of pulque in Colonia Portales, a neighborhood in Mexico City

Pulque is a milky, foamy, alcoholic beverage native to central Mexico and made from fermented maguey sap, similar to tequila and mescal but with a much lower alcohol content, between 3 and 4%. The maguey plant flourishes in hot climates with little to no water, as the plant stores water very well, much like a cactus. The maguey grows slowly and the sap must be removed shortly before the plant flowers. Once the tapping begins, the plant produces "about a half gallon [of sap] a day for three months." With a tool that looks like a spoon and is called a tlaquiche, a worker known as a tlachiquero "scrapes off the center of the plant to extract the liquid previously mentioned. He then collects it in a hollow bowl called an acocote, to then be placed in a container called an odre." The containers used for the fermentation process are usually made from animal skins, often cow leather. Leather is popular because of its ability to thermoregulate; leather also provides the sap with necessary beneficial bacteria cultures that improve taste and consistency. Pulque naturally ferments in less than twenty-four hours. Because it will spoil quickly after this period, every step in the process must be taken in close sequence and physical proximity. The maguey plants, the production and distribution facilities, and the places to which the pulque is distributed must all be relatively close together geographically. The taste has been described as slightly sour. Pure pulque is often mixed with fruit juices and other foods to create different flavors.

== Pulque before the Spanish conquest ==
Pulque has been drunk in the lands of central Mexico and other parts of Mesoamerica since before the times of the Aztecs, who regarded the maguey plant as a divine gift. Although the natives originally had many uses for the maguey plant, the sap became the most sacred and important part of the plant because of its intoxicating qualities. The Aztecs strictly controlled the consumption of the drink, regulating who could drink, when people could drink, how much people could drink, and even how people could drink. Priests and warriors of status were the only ones allowed to drink the "gods' beverage" on any day other than very special occasions. Many times, prisoners about to be sacrificed were given pulque to further please the gods. Other more "ordinary" people who drank pulque more frequently were the elderly, the sick, and pregnant women, because of the belief that the drink had healing powers. People were not allowed to drink to excess, as drunkenness was highly looked down on and only allowed to priests during specific rituals. Because of this, "Aztecs permitted four cups at the most and controlled the size according to age and gender." When drinking pulque during Aztec times, it was also required to pour some of the beverage on the ground, typically at the four sides of the room a person was in.

Pulque has a place in some Aztec legends. As one myth goes, the god Quetzalcoatl was tricked into getting intoxicated by drinking pulque and had sexual relations with a celibate priestess (in other tellings, it was his sister, the goddess Quetzalpetlatl). Embarrassed, Quetzalcoatl banished himself to the sea, saying he would return one day to get his revenge. The year he was said to return coincided with the year Hernán Cortés landed on the shores of Mexico in 1519. The Mural of the Drinkers found in the Great Pyramid of Cholula also depicts pulque drinking during the time of the Aztecs. The mural "portrays a feasting scene with figures wearing elaborate turbans and masks, drinking pulque and performing other ritual activities. It has been suggested that the scene portrays pulque deities."

== Pulque in colonial Mexico: the first pulquerias ==
The Spanish conquest of Mexico and the Aztec people changed every aspect of the native population's lives. The Spanish attempted to modernize and develop Mexico, focusing much of their attention on what would become Mexico City. This conquest and the accompanying technology provided many of the local inhabitants with new types of work and leisure activity. Buildings erected with hispanic construction methods and other infrastructure brought immigrants to the city. Along with industrial development and modernization, the Spanish also brought Catholicism. With Catholicism came many festivals and celebrations in which pulque was the drink du jour. Unlike the Aztec reverence for the sacred drink, the Spanish conquistadors did not prohibit excess consumption. Common people were allowed to drink as much pulque as they wished, and with the increase in urban jobs as well as money and leisure time, the consumption and sale of pulque began to rise. By the 1530s, commoners were selling pulque in the streets, and at least twelve pulque stands operated regularly in the city.

By the 1550s the number of stands had more than doubled. Petitions eventually allowed permanent stands as well as mobile carts. With easier access to both fixed and mobile stands, pulque consumption skyrocketed, especially in Mexico City. Well over 100 stands, both licensed and unlicensed, operated throughout Mexico City by the middle of the following century. Pulque and these first primitive pulquerias were firmly establishing themselves as a mainstay of urban popular culture. As the outdoor stands evolved to serve more customers, they built walls and ceilings for protection from the elements, and later to help hide them from public view. "Some had already the form of taverns where patrons could take a seat and interact with each other." The drink was also spreading among the array of classes and ethnicities that had sprung up during this time. Everyone from low-class Spaniards, criollos, blacks, and castas could drink their share of pulque. Pulque taverns eventually began to serve food and employ attractive women to serve it. The addition of seats and live music became a permanent fixture.

However, for the elite upper classes, the government, and the Church, the popularity of the pulqueria was seen as a "threat to the social order and the status quo" of the cities. For these groups of higher social standing, pulquerias represented laziness, animalistic sexuality, and general degenerative behavior preventing societal progress. The Spanish authorities enacted new rules and regulations in the late 1600s to limit the number of pulquerias, to allow fewer and smaller storage rooms for extra pulque, and to completely eliminate seating. But these restrictions did not do much to reduce their popularity, and their patrons continued to frequent them. Pulquerias and what they represented continued to be a major source of contention between the Spanish ruling class and the urban masses throughout the Bourbon period until Mexico gained independence in 1821.

== Pulquerias after independence ==
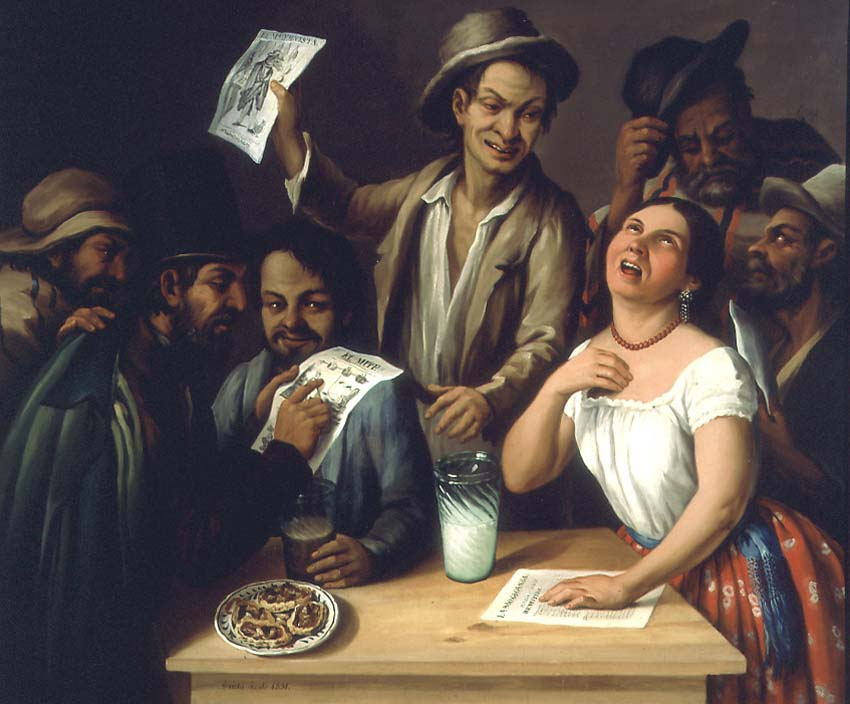
Tertulia de Pulquería (Tertulia in Pulquería), an 1851 painting by Agustín Arrieta, a Pueblan painter

The beginning of modern Mexico saw a decrease in the regulations imposed on pulquerias. This was because of the lack of strong central government in the newly independent state, as well as the political and economic advantages that local governors saw in this well-established institution. The second half of the 19th century saw another jump in the number of pulquerias, especially in Mexico City, because of this lack of regulation and further urban growth. Previously, established pulquerias were located on the outskirts of the city, but during this time they forged their way into the heart of the city. By 1900 the number of pulquerias in Mexico City had ballooned to nearly a thousand, nearly one on every corner. This was the time when pulquerias also gained the character for which they are known today: elaborate décor and unique names. Both inside and outside the pulquerias were decorated with vibrant, gaudy murals (commonly of the Virgin of Guadalupe) and the extravagant names of the pulquerias competed to attract customers.

The names of pulquerias are considered to be important for their identity and are often representative of contemporary popular culture in Mexico. They not only told the customers what to expect from that particular establishment, but also made references to popular literature, the theater, as well as international figures or events. Opera titles such as Norma, Semiramide, and La Traviata were in use, as were literary figures, Don Quixote and The Hunchback of Notre-Dame, among others. More romantic and militant names like The Great Napoleon and Mexico's Former Glories were also common. More bizarre names included Sal si Puedes ("Get Out If You Can") and El Asalto ("The Assault"). Barrels of pulque were also given different names depending on their flavor or alcoholic strength, such as the "pulque of the tough ones" or the "whining female". Many of the names written on the walls of the outside of the pulquerias were misspelled, which is thought to be a testimony to the low literacy rates in Mexico at the time.

== Daytime in the pulqueria ==
The day's delivery of pigskin sacks of pulque in carts pulled by donkeys or mules arrive at the pulquerias by eight or nine in the morning. The workers cleaned the pulqueria and then put the newly bought drink into its respective barrels. Then the cooks would start preparing the different dishes customers would order later that day, including enchiladas, quesadillas, tacos, tostados, sopes, mole poblano, chalupas, and others. Starting around ten, the customers began to shuffle in. The first, arriving from around ten to eleven, were usually natives coming in from outside the city. After they had sold their fruits and vegetables in the morning they would come in to enjoy some food and pulque. "After noon, chinas [girls wearing the traditional dress], charros, artisans, and many other invaded." Throughout the day and into the evening the pulquerias served all members of society: "Crowds of maids, servants, butchers, artisans, vendors, kids, thieves, guards, prostitutes, and honorable members of the 'gente decente' appeared in dappled skin colors and clothing styles." Customers would eat, drink, dance, sing, gamble, fight, perhaps take part in a little crime, and do everything imaginable. One could see people from all walks of life when entering a pulqueria. The day usually ended in the pulqueria sometime after sunset. Customers gradually filtered out to go home or to other jobs. Some were so drunk that they slept in the entryway or in a nearby street.

== Pulquerias and the liberal reform during the Porfiriato (1876–1911) ==
Porfirio Díaz's regime as leader of Mexico was from 1876 to 1911 and its main goal was to bring order and progress to the country. In particular, Díaz wanted to bring Mexico into the industrial world and its people to be productive, upstanding members of society. Vices such as drunkenness, laziness, and promiscuity were seen as retarding the beneficial progress of the city and the nation. Much like the Spanish authority, the Porfirian government and elites saw pulquerias a main source of such vices. So around the turn of the twentieth century there was an increase in the number of reforms and regulations centered on limiting the distribution of pulque, and supervising the use and role of pulquerias. These had to be licensed and located at least 60 m (200 ft) apart. Opening hours were restricted to between 6.00 a.m. and 6:30 p.m., thus forcing them to close before most workers had left their jobs. There were also many other restrictions on the location of pulquerias. Certain areas of the city, in particular those surrounding the Alameda central park, were forbidden to pulquerias because the Mexican authority did not want the beauty of this area spoiled by what they considered to be the undesirable characteristics associated with pulquerias. Overall, the Porfirian reforms enacted to directly limit the influence of pulquerias during the Porfiriato did not do much to reduce their popularity in Mexico City and the rest of the country. The Porfiriato did, however, encourage more modern attitudes in Mexico which indirectly and over time led to the diminished popularity of pulquerias.

== Decline ==
By the mid 1900s, after Mexico started to industrialize and modernize, the consumption of pulque and the popularity of pulquerias had greatly declined. This is directly related to the increase in production and popularity of beer in Mexico. As factories established themselves and migrant workers started to come into Mexico, the beer industry greatly expand and beer soon replaced pulque as the alcoholic drink of choice. The popularity of pulquerias declined as they were seen as a thing of the past. By the 1930s, there was a steep reduction in the number of pulquerias in Mexico City, and today there are very few of them left.

== Pulquerias today ==
The very few pulquerias now found in Mexico City are there more for nostalgic reasons than anything else, a reminder of the Mexican past for the small group of people who enjoy the old style Mexican tavern. Today, pulquerias are more likely to be described as places where young hipsters like to be seen. "Pulqueria owners estimate that only 100 such places are left in Mexico."
