= Café de las Salesas =

Defunct café in Madrid, Spain (1878–1945)

Coordinates: 40°25′25.36″N 3°41′38.49″W

The Café de las Salesas (1878–1945) was an establishment in Madrid located on Calle de las Salesas street, and later at number 17 of Calle del Conde de Xiquena street and the corner of Plaza de las Salesas square. It was a classic 19th-century café with large mirrors on the walls that made it seem more spacious, marble tables and wooden chairs, large maroon booths, metal columns under crystal chandeliers, and a ringer telephone. For a while, it was also a café-chantant venue and had a billiard room as well.

== History ==
The Café was far enough away from what was then the center of Madrid that it was a quiet and secluded venue. Its daily clientele was made up mainly of locals from the neighborhood, such as lawyers coming in from the headquarters of the Court of Public Order, located at the Convent of the Salesas Reales, in addition to occasional witnesses or relatives of the accused, and journalists in search of news, especially of gruesome cases such as the crime of Fuencarral street (which took place in 1888). (Note: Federico Oliver Crespo, first president of the Spanish Society of Authors and Publishers, chose the Café de las Salesas as the setting for much of the plot of his play El crimen de todos (1916).) Another one of the cafe's usual services was to provide the meals served to the detainees. It was also affected by the waiters' strike in Madrid in 1918. (Note: On 3 October of that same year, a note in the newspapers announced that the café's owner had agreed to the workers' claims and that service at the establishment would resume.)

As a café de tertulia, one of the most popular tertulias held at the Café de las Salesas was that of "Los Salesianos", a meeting that usually took place between 11:00 a.m. and 1:30 p.m. and in which participants stuck to discussing politics. Despite this, they respected the motto "Discutir sí, pelear no" (Note: English: Yes to dialogue, no to fights) (which in the years prior to the Civil War was "No atacar, pero sí defenderse" (Note: English: No to attacks, but yes to defending oneself)), as well as the motto "Entre hombres de bien no puede haber engaños". (Note: English: There can be no deceit among gentlemen.) Participants in the tertulia included journalist Augusto Vivero Rodríguez, who acted as chairman, and attorney Eduardo Ortega y Gasset (older brother to the philosopher José), or those who endorsed opposing ideologies, such as the militant communist Marino García and diehard right-winger Francisco Olías. In order to be admitted to the tertulia, it was mandatory to use a specific brand of fountain pens. (Note: The National Library of Spain keeps some documentary photographic archives with members of Los Salesianos gathered at the café's tertulia in the 1930s.)

According to journalist Fernando Orgambides, from El País, apart from lawyers and journalists, the Café de las Salesas was also the meeting place of choice for writers such as Benito Pérez Galdós, Pío Baroja, Enrique Jardiel Poncela, and Ramón del Valle-Inclán, composer José Padilla, and activist Colombine, among others.

== An appointment with Machado ==
On 8 December 1933, communist journalist Rosario del Olmo set up an appointment with poet Antonio Machado at the Café de las Salesas. The event, insignificant in and of itself, would be immortalized by photographer Alfonso Sánchez García in an image that is considered one of the most representative photographs of Machado. The photograph included a third figure in the scene, that of Braulio, the waiter, reflected in the large mirror alongside the page of a calendar marking the date. The original photograph, which became famous from a cropped fragment, showed the journalist sitting beside the poet at a table in the café, under the waiter's reflection in a mirror. Both the photograph and the interview would not be published until 12 January 1934 by newspaper La Libertad, with the title Deberes del arte en el momento actual.

== See also ==
- Café Gijón
- Café Comercial
- Tertulia

== Bibliography ==
- Gibson, Ian (2006). Ligero de equipaje: la vida de Antonio Machado (in Spanish). Madrid: Aguilar. ISBN 9788403096868.
