= Pilar Prades =

Spanish maid sentenced to death for murder through arsenic poisoning

- Born: 1928; Bejís, Kingdom of Spain
- Died: 19 May 1959 (aged 30–31); Valencia, Francoist Spain
- Status: Executed by garrote
- Conviction: Murder
- Penalty: Death

Details
- Victims: Adela Pascual
- Weapon: Arsenic poisoning

Pilar Prades Expósito or Santamaría (1928 – 19 May 1959) was a Spanish maid, sentenced to death for murder through arsenic poisoning. She was the last woman executed in Spain.

== Biography ==
Born into a humble family in Bejís, she moved to Valencia to enter service when she was twelve years old. Illiterate and introverted, she changed houses several times until 1954 when she began working for Enrique Vilanova and Adela Pascual, a married couple who ran a farmhouse on calle Sagunto in Valencia. Prades worked in their home and even attended the counter of the delicatessen when customers lined up. On March 19, Adela fell ill with what was initially diagnosed as influenza and then died. After her death, Enrique kicked Prades out of the house, closed the business and left Valencia.

Prades then began work at the home of the military doctor Manuel Berenguer and his wife Mª (Note: Spanish abbreviation of María) del Carmen Cid, recommended by Aurelia Sanz Hernanz, the cook. Soon, Aurelia fell ill. Berenguer, alarmed, took Aurelia to hospital, where she experienced some improvement. When his wife began exhibiting the same symptoms, he consulted other specialists and they performed a diagnostic test to confirm the presence of poison. Suspecting Prades, he contacted Enrique Vilanova. After that, he filed a complaint against Prades and Adela's body was exhumed and tested positive for arsenic.

Although the evidence was considered circumstantial, since Prades confessed after 36 hours without eating or sleeping, a flask of an arsenic-based antkiller, thought to be the poison used, was found among her belongings. Despite the advice of her lawyer, she pleaded not guilty. She was sentenced to death by garroting.

== Execution ==
The executioner designated to carry out the execution was Antonio López Sierra who, after finding out that the person to be executed was a woman, refused to carry out the execution. The execution, scheduled for six in the morning, was carried out more than two hours later, waiting for a pardon that did not arrive. The executioner had got drunk and had to be dragged to the execution room.

== In popular culture ==
Prades' life inspired the radio serial usually called La galleguita de la cara sucia ('The little Galician girl with the dirty face') in Argentina, with a great audience success.

The anecdote of the executioner forcibly taken to the gallows inspired the movie The Executioner by Luis García Berlanga.

In the documentary Dear Executioners by Basilio Martín Patino, Antonio López is asked about the execution of Pilar Prades.

In 1985, the first season of the Televisión Española (TVE) anthology series La huella del crimen was produced, one of whose episodes was dedicated to the case of Prades. This was played by actress Terele Pávez in an episode directed by Pedro Olea. José Prades, Pilar's brother, sued TVE and the screenwriter for honour injuries, a lawsuit that was dismissed by the Supreme Court.
