= Garcilasismo =

El Garcilasismo (also known as Juventud Creadora or Creative Youth) is one of the main themes of Spanish post-civil-war poetry whose followers met in Café Gijón, Madrid.

The movement took its name from a magazine entitled "Garcilaso" which was first published in 1943, Garcilaso de la Vega was a Spanish soldier and poet who first introduced the Italian Renaissance verse forms into Spanish poetry in the early 16th Century. The first three editions of the magazine were edited by Jose Garcia Nieto. It enjoyed only a short life (up to number 36) and ceased publication in April 1946.

The Garcilasismo genre falls within a wider category of contemporary Spanish poetry which Damaso Alonso dubbed "poesía arraigada" (indicating "root" or primitive poetry).

== Personalities ==
The Garcilaso movement brought together a number of poets who called themselves Garcilasistas because they met initially to celebrate the four hundredth anniversary of the death of Garcilaso de la Vega on October 14, 1536. The Civil War had already begun in summer of that year. They formed part of a wider group of academics and artists known as "Generation of 36" who were working about the time Civil war broke out. Leading Garcilasistas included:

- Luis Rosales
- es:Luis Felipe Vivanco
- Leopoldo Panero
- Dionisio Ridruejo
- Salvador Pérez
- es:García Nieto
- es:Jose Valiente

== Characteristics ==
The Garcilasismo poetry style broke with traditional metrics, giving predominance to the sonnet, which constructed and resolved harmoniously, in contrast to the harrowing reality of Spain after the Civil War.

These authors, as the name of their hero may suggest, tried to provide a representation of an idealized poet soldier, eager for love and beauty very different from the reality of the violence and hatreds of the actual warfare then raging. Their alternative world is harmonious, fulfilled and orderly, if somewhat melancholy. The themes of the Garcilasistas are those of lyrical poetry: love, death, God, the Castilian landscape, their homeland and nation.

Similar sentiments may also ascribed some earlier works of "Generation of 27" (writers if the early period of the II Republic) such as the poet Gerardo Diego who wrote "Ángeles de Compostela o Alondra de verdad" (approximately: Angels of Pilgrims or Lark of Truth). The language of the garcilasistas poetry may have been intended to echo and revitalize the neo-popular patriotic spirit of Generation of 27.

== See also ==
- Café Gijón (Madrid)
- Generacion 36
- Generacion 27
