= Andalusia Express =

- Directed by: Francisco Rovira Beleta
- Written by: Vicente Coello; Giuseppe Mangione; Francisco Rovira Beleta; Manuel Salo
- Starring: Jorge Mistral; Marisa de Leza; Mara Berni
- Cinematography: Tino Santoni
- Edited by: Antonio Gimeno
- Music by: Carlo Innocenzi; Isidro B. Maiztegui
- Production company: Fortuna Films
- Distributed by: PROCINES
- Release date: 6 September 1956
- Running time: 80 minutes
- Countries: Italy; Spain
- Languages: Italian; Spanish

Andalusia Express (Italian:Il mondo sarà nostro, Spanish:El expreso de Andalucía) is a 1956 Italian-Spanish drama film directed by Francisco Rovira Beleta and starring Jorge Mistral, Marisa de Leza and Mara Berni. Loosely based on the Andalusian Mail Train Robbery case.

== Synopsis ==
A former retired athlete, a law student and a petty criminal come together to plan and perpetrate the theft of some jewelry transported in the Andalusian express mail van.

== Cast ==
- Jorge Mistral as Jorge Andrade
- Marisa de Leza as Lola
- Mara Berni as Silvia Ríos
- Vicente Parra as Miguel Hernández
- Ignazio Balsamo as Rubio
- Carlos Casaravilla as Carlos Salinas
- Antonio Casas as Inspector
- Natale Cirino
- Franco Sineri
- Flora Marrone
- José Calvo as Arturo
- Ricardo Turia
- Marcelino Ornat
- José Castro
- Marcela Yurfa
- Manuel Aroca
- Salvador Soler Marí
- María del Carmen Morales
- José Ramón Giner as Cliente de las gafas
- José Luis López Vázquez as Pretendiente de Lola
- Piero Signorelli
- Saro Spadaro
- Michele Abruzzo
- Manuel Aguilera as Empleado de casa de empeños
- Juan Cazalilla as Camarero del hotel
- Goyo Lebrero as Empleado de Correos
- Ángel Álvarez as Apostador en frontón

== Bibliography ==
- Mira, Alberto. Historical Dictionary of Spanish Cinema. Scarecrow Press, 2010.
