= Diego Medrano =

Spanish poet (born 1978)

Diego Medrano Fernández (Oviedo, Spain, 1978 (Note: The El Neuva Crónica interview states the year of birth as 1976. The review of El hombre entre las rocas and the blurb in Europa Press both state 1978.)) is a Spanish poet, fiction writer, and regular columnist of Asturian newspaper El Comercio.

== Career ==
Medrano published Los héroes inutiles (The Useless Heroes) in 2005, a complete collection of the correspondence that he held with Spanish writer Leopoldo María Panero. He also published his first poetry book in 2005: El hombre entre las rocas (The Man Among the Rocks).

He published his first novel El clítoris de Camille (Camille's Clitoris) in early 2006. That year, he also published a book of micro-stories, Los sueños diurnos. Manual para amantes, pobres y asesinos (Daylight Dreams. Instructions for lovers, beggars and murderers).

In 2007, Medrano published La soledad no tiene edad (Loneliness Has No Age), a book of novellas and short stories.

In 2008, he published the poetry book Agua me falta (Got No Water).

He has also published other poetry books such as El viento muerde (The Wind Bites) and A veces cuerdo (Sometimes Sane), as well as the first volume of his diaries, Diario del artista echado a perder (Diary Of The Wasted Artist).

== Bibliography ==
- Panero, Lepoldo María; Medrano, Diego (2005). Los héroes inútiles (in Spanish). Ellago Ediciones. ISBN 978-8495881625.
- Medrano, Diego (2005). El hombre entre las rocas (in Spanish). Arena Books. ISBN 9788495897350.
- Medrano, Diego (2006). El clítoris de Camille (in Spanish). Seix Barral. ISBN 9788432212086.
- Medrano, Diego (2006). Diario del artista echado a perder (in Spanish). Páginas de Espuma. ISBN 9788495642820.
- Medrano, Diego (2006). Los sueños diurnos: Manual para amantes, pobres y asesinos (in Spanish). Cahoba. ISBN 9788498320589.
- Maderno, Diego (2007). La soledad no tiene edad (in Spanish). Septem Ediciones. ISBN 9788496491564.
- Medrano, Diego (2008). Agua Me Falta Traegdia y Neurosis 1999-2007 (in Spanish). Septem Ediciones. ISBN 9788496491717.
- Medrano, Diego (2009). Tapa el sol con el pulgar (in Spanish). Editorial Difácil. ISBN 978-8492476084.
