= Glorieta de Bilbao =

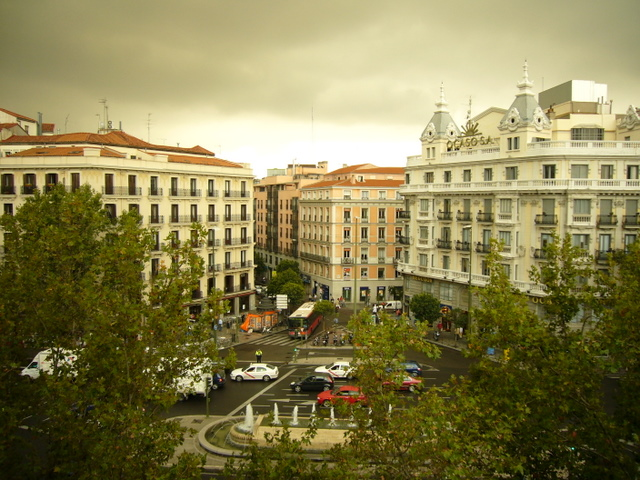
- Interactive map of Glorieta de Bilbao
- Type: roundabout
- Maintained by: Ayuntamiento of Madrid
- Location: Madrid, Spain
- Coordinates: 40.42278°N 3.71194°W

The Glorieta de Bilbao is a star-shaped roundabout located in Madrid, Spain, named after the city of Bilbao

== Location ==
The roundabout is famous for being a cross of famous streets: Calle de Fuencarral (one of the most famous shopping streets in Madrid), Carranza, Luchana and Sagasta. Glorieta de Bilbao is also between two of the most historical districts of Madrid: Centro (1) and Chamberí (7). The history of Glorieta is fully connected with the building of Chamberí area during the 19th century, being at that time one of the most crucial places where madrileños met.

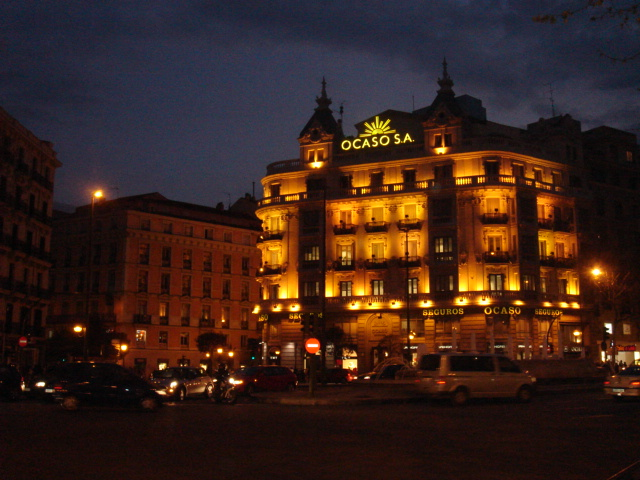
Glorieta de Bilbao

== Places of interest ==
It is an important place in the Madrid's nightlife, close to Malasaña and Tribunal areas.

One of the most historical cafes of Madrid, the Café Comercial, is located in the number 7 of the Glorieta. The most notable building of Glorieta de Bilbao is Ocaso Building.

== Transport ==
Its metro station is called Bilbao and is served by Line 1 and Line 4.
