= Francisco Umbral =

Spanish writer (1932–2007)

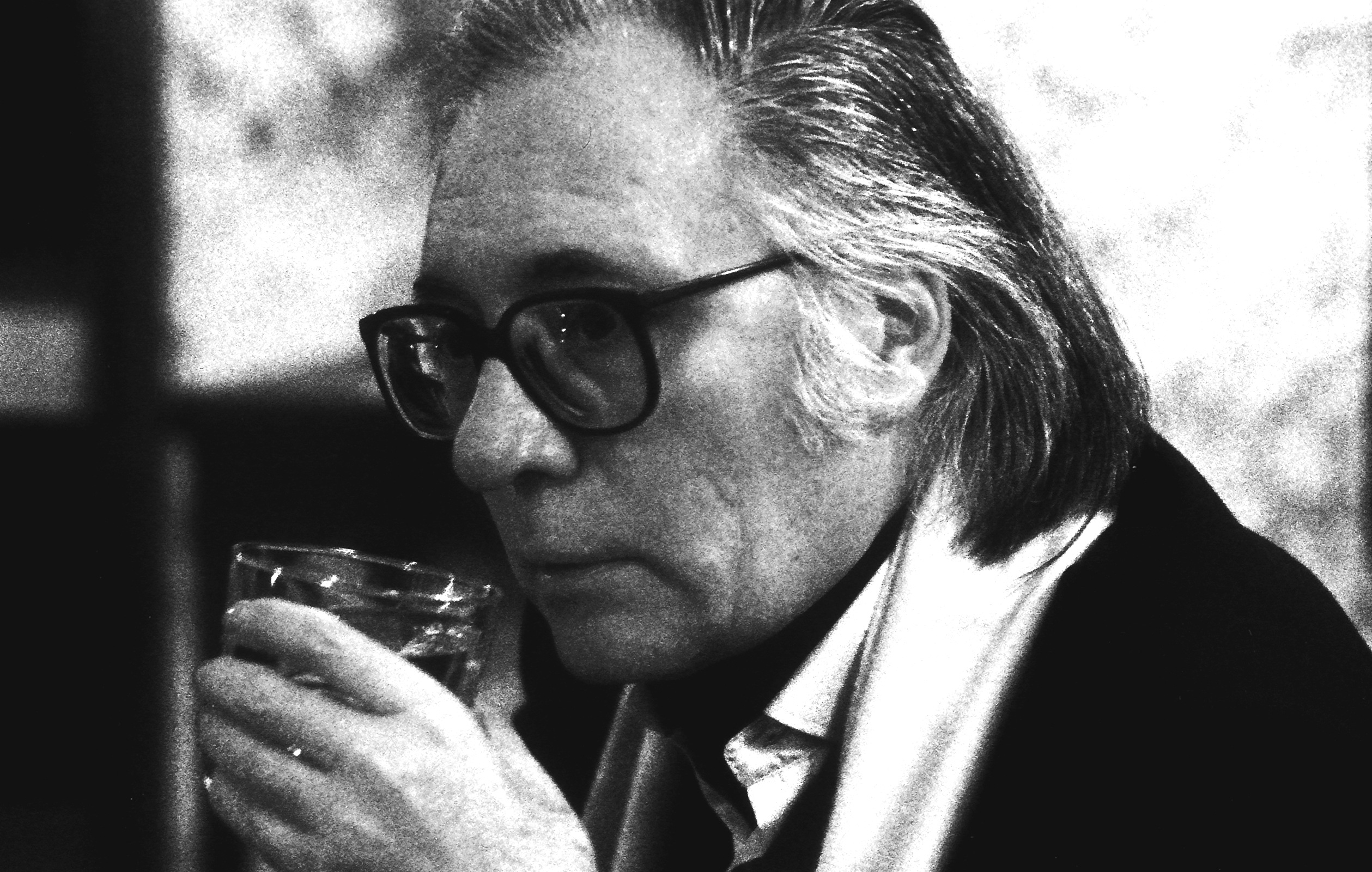
- Umbral in 1992
- Born: Francisco Alejandro Pérez Martínez; 11 May 1932; Madrid, Spain
- Died: 28 August 2007 (aged 75); Madrid, Spain
- Occupation: journalist
- Writing career
- Language: Spanish
- Genre: novelist

Francisco Alejandro Pérez Martínez (11 May 1932 – 28 August 2007), better known as Francisco Umbral, was a Spanish journalist, novelist, biographer and essayist.

== Style ==
Although he was born in Madrid, a city that has inspired most of his work, his early years were spent in Valladolid. His mother travelled to Madrid for his birth, because he was an illegitimate child. His mother's indifference and distance from him left him with an enduring sadness, as did the death of his only son at the age of six, which caused him to write his saddest and most personal book, Mortal y rosa (A Mortal Spring). This fostered a characteristic bitter and stiff outlook in the author, devoid of hopefulness, absolutely submerged in literature, which has provoked many controversies and hostilities.

In Valladolid, he began his journalistic career at El Norte de Castilla, under the tutorship of Miguel Delibes. In 1961, he went to Madrid as a correspondent for said newspaper and quickly became a prestigious reporter and columnist in magazines such as La Estafeta Literaria, Mundo Hispánico and Interviú, and in influential newspapers such as Ya and ABC, although he is best known for his writings for the daily newspapers El País (founded in 1976 just after the death of the Spanish dictator Francisco Franco and the restoration of constitutionalism and democracy) and El Mundo (founded 1990). At El País, he was one of the reporters who was best able to describe the countercultural movement known as La Movida, but his literary quality undoubtedly came from his creative fecundity, his linguistic sensibility and the extreme originality of his style: very careful and complex, creative in its syntax, very metaphorically developed and flexible, abundant in neologisms and intertextual allusions; in sum, of a demanding lyric and aesthetic quality. He exercised a type of anti-bourgeois criticism of customs and manners, without renouncing the most intensely romantic ego, and, in the words of Novalis, having the intent of giving the dignity of the unknown to everyday life, impregnating it with a desolate tenderness. As a political reporter, Umbral was a highly trenchant writer. Having become a successful journalist and writer, he worked with Spain's most varied and influential magazines and newspapers. Among the many published volumes of his articles, the following stand out:

- Diario de un snob ("Diary of a snob", 1973)
- Spleen de Madrid ("Madrid Spleen", 1973, the title being a reference to Charles Baudelaire's Paris Spleen)
- España cañí (1975)
- Iba yo a comprar el pan ("I went out to buy bread", 1976)
- Los políticos ("Politicians", 1976)
- Crónicas postfranquistas ("Post-Francoist Chronicles", 1976)
- Las Jais ("Birds", "Chicks" [slang, i.e. "Girls"] 1977)
- Spleen de Madrid–2 ("Madrid Spleen–2", 1982)
- España como invento ("Spain as an invention", 1984)
- La belleza convulsa ("Convulsive Beauty", 1985)
- Memorias de un hijo del siglo ("Memories of a child of the century", 1986)
- Mis placeres y mis días ("My pleasures and my days", 1994).

Among non-readers, he is remembered by an appearance in Mercedes Milá's TV program Queremos saber in Antena 3 TV (1993). After some conversation, Umbral interrupted the conversation claiming that he had come to talk about his then latest book, La década roja, not to entertain the presenter.

== Work ==
=== Narratives ===
Highlights of his very extensive narrative production, in which autobiographical aspects stand out, include:

- Tamouré (1965)
- Balada de gamberros ("Louts' Ballad", 1965)
- Travesía de Madrid ("Crossing Madrid", 1966)
- Las vírgenes ("The Virgins", 1969)
- Si hubiéramos sabido que el amor era eso ("If we had known that love was this", 1969)
- El Giocondo (1970) about the homosexual milieu of Madrid (the title is a play on the Italian "la Gioconda", the name of the painting known in English as the Mona Lisa)
- Las europeas ("European Girls", 1970)
- Memorias de un niño de derechas ("Memoirs of a child of the right", 1972)
- Los males sagrados ("Holy Evils", 1973)
- Mortal y rosa ("A Mortal Spring", 1975)
- Las ninfas ("The Nymphs", 1975, received the Premio Nadal)
- Los amores diurnos ("Daytime Love", 1979)
- Los helechos arborescentes ("The Tree Ferns", 1980)
- La bestia rosa ("The Pink Beast", 1981)
- Los ángeles custodios ("Guardian Angels", 1981)
- Las ánimas del purgatorio, ("The Souls of Purgatory", 1982)
- Trilogía de Madrid ("Madrid Trilogy", 1984)
- Pío XII, escolta mora y un general sin un ojo ("Pius XII, the Moorish Escort and a General Missing an Eye", 1985)
- Nada en el domingo ("Nothing on Sunday", 1988)
- El día en que violé a Alma Mahler ("The Day I Raped Alma Mahler", 1988)
- El fulgor de África ("The Radiance of Africa", 1989)
- Y Tierno Galván ascendió a los cielos ("And Tierno Galván Ascended to the Heavens", 1990)
- Leyenda del César Visionario ("The Legend of the Visionary Caesar", 1992, winner of the Critics' Prize), Madrid, 1940 (1993)
- Las señoritas de Aviñón ("The Young Ladies of Avignon", 1995; the title is a reference to a painting by Pablo Picasso generally known in the English-speaking world by its French-language name, Les Demoiselles d'Avignon)
- Madrid 1950 (1995), Capital del dolor ("The Capital of Sorrow", 1996)
- La forja de un ladrón ("A Thief's Forge", 1997)
- Historias de amor y Viagra ("Stories of Love and Viagra", 1998)

In 1985, Umbral began a series of novels about the most important events in the history of twentieth-century Spain, after the fashion of the Episodios nacionales of Benito Pérez Galdós for the nineteenth century.

=== Essays ===
He also wrote a set of very personal essays, under such titles as:

- La escritura perpetua (De Rubén Darío a Cela) ("Perpetual Writing (From Rubén Darío to Cela)", 1989)*
- Las palabras de la tribu ("The Words of the Tribe", 1994)
- Diccionario de literatura ("Dictionary of Literature", 1995)
- Madrid, tribu urbana ("Madrid, Urban Tribe", 2000)
- Los alucinados ("Hallucinations", 2001)
- Cela: un cadáver exquisito ("Cela, an Exquisite Corpse", 2002)
- ¿Y cómo eran las ligas de Madame Bovary? ("And What Were Madame Bovary's Garters Like?", 2003).

His preoccupation with slang is shown by:

- Diccionario para pobres ("Dictionary for the Poor", 1977)
- Diccionario cheli ("Cheli Dictionary", 1983, Cheli being to Madrid what Cockney is to London)
- Las palabras de la tribu ("The Words of the Tribe", 1994).

=== Biographies and autobiographies ===
He also published biographical and literary essays presenting original views about classical authors of the 19th and 20th centuries, such as:

- Larra, anatomía de un dandy ("Larra, anatomy of a dandy", 1965)
- Lorca, poeta maldito (1968, about Federico García Lorca; the title is ambiguous, and could be interpreted as calling Lorca a "wicked", or "indecent" poet or one who is "cursed" either in the sense of being "spoken against" or "unlucky")
- Ramón y las vanguardias ("Ramón and the vanguards", 1978)
- Valle-Inclán: los botines blancos de piqué ("Valle-Inclán: "White Piqué Boots", 1997)

Other biographies are more revealing:

- Valle-Inclán (1968)
- Lord Byron (1969)
- Miguel Delibes (1970)
- Lola Flores, sociología de la petenera ("Lola Flores, sociology of the petenera", 1971).

Although autobiography is also present throughout his journalistic work, several of his works are explicitly autobiographical:

- La noche que llegué al café Gijón ("The night I arrived at the Café Gijón" 1977)
- Memorias eróticas (Los cuerpos gloriosos) ("Erotic memories: the glorious bodies", 1992)
- El hijo de Greta Garbo ("Son of Greta Garbo", 1977).

== Honours and awards ==
- Gabriel Miró National Prize for Stories (1964)
- Carlos Arniches de la SGAE (1975)
- Premio Nadal (1975)
- César González Ruano Prize for Newspaper Journalism (1980)
- Francisco Cerecedo Prize (1995)
- Prince of Asturias Award for Letters (1996)
- Fernando Lara Novel Award for La forja de un ladrón (1997)
- National Prize for Letters (1997)
- Premio Cervantes (2000)
