= Garrote =

Execution method

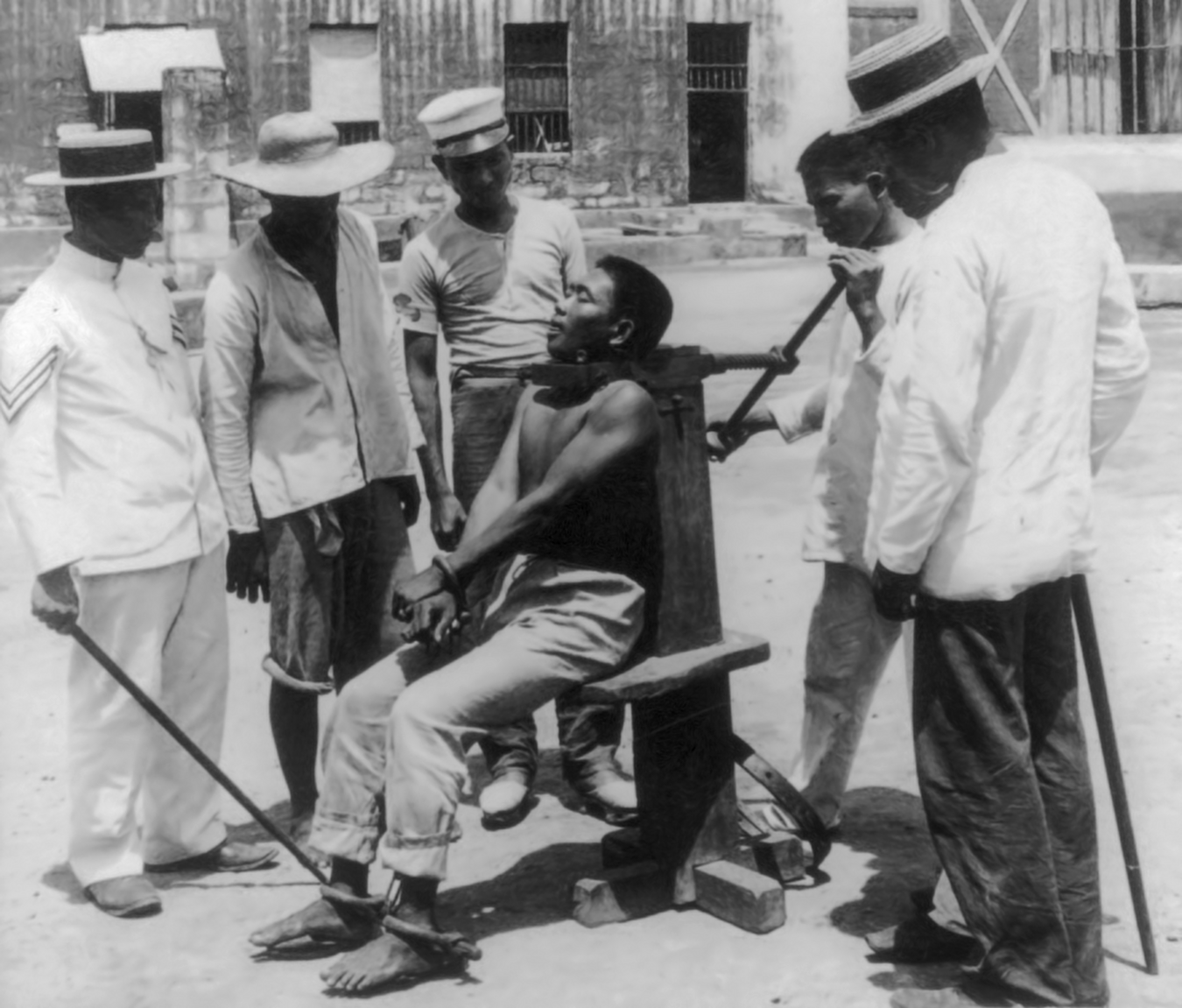
A 1901 execution at the old Bilibid Prison in Manila, Philippines

A garrote (American English) or garrotte (British English) (/ɡəˈrɒt, ɡəˈroʊt/ gə-RO(H)T; alternatively spelled as garotte), or garrote vil (Spanish: [ɡaˈrote ˈβil]), is a weapon and a method of capital punishment. It consists of a handheld (or, in later years, sometimes mechanical) ligature of chain, rope, scarf, wire, or fishing line, used to strangle a person.

== Assassination weapon ==
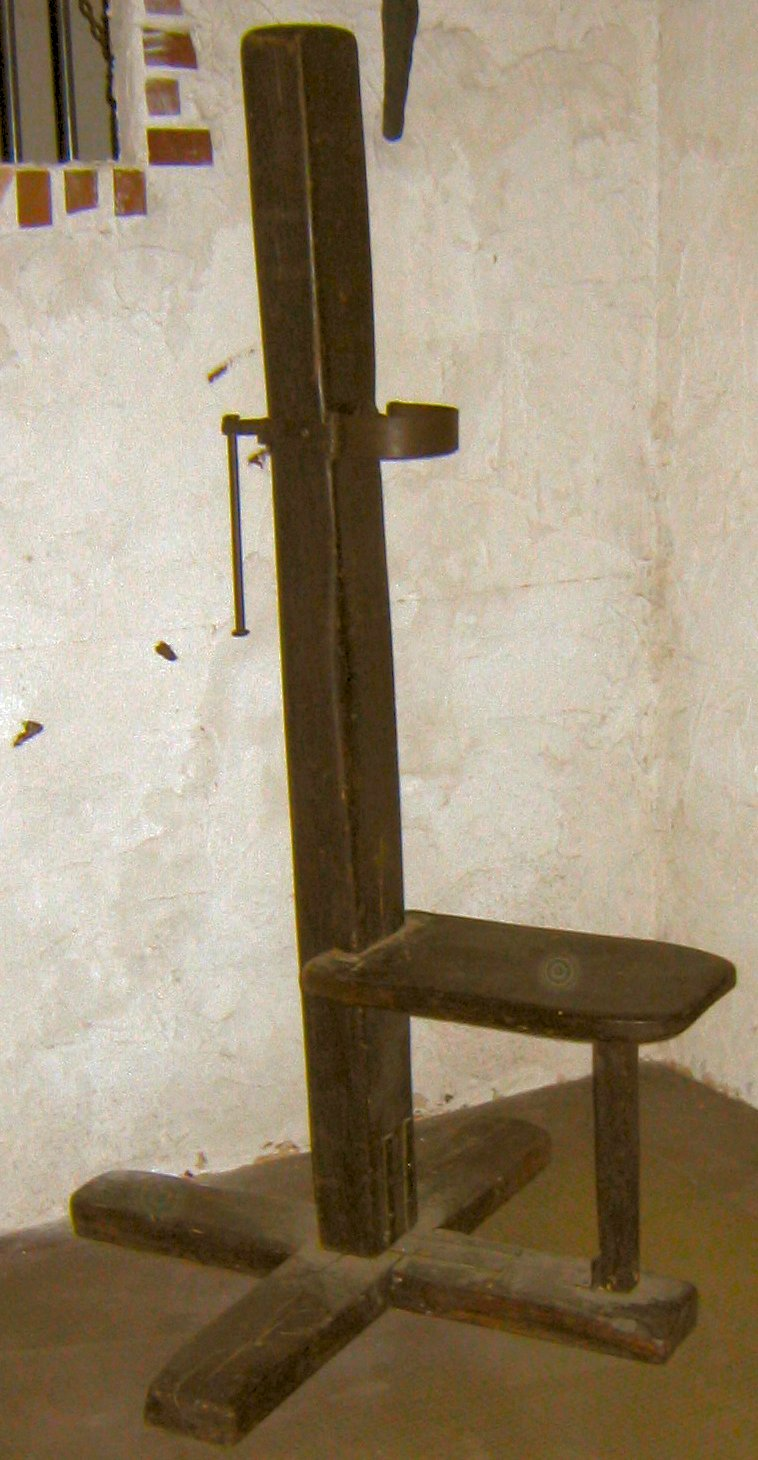
From the torture museum of Freiburg im Breisgau

A garrote can be made of different materials, including ropes, cloth, cable ties, fishing lines, nylon, guitar strings, telephone cord or piano wire. A stick may be used to tighten the garrote; the Spanish word refers to the stick itself. In Spanish, the term may also refer to a rope and stick used to constrict a limb as a torture device.

Since World War II, the garrote has been regularly employed as a weapon by soldiers as a silent means of killing sentries and other enemy personnel. Instruction in the use of purpose-built and improvised garrotes is included in the training of many elite military units and special forces. A typical military garrote consists of two wooden handles attached to a length of flexible wire; the wire is looped over a sentry's head and pulled taut in one motion. Soldiers of the French Foreign Legion have used a particular type of double-loop garrote (referred to as la loupe), where a double coil of rope or cord is dropped around a victim's neck and then pulled taut. Even if the victim pulls on one of the coils, the other is tightened.

Garrote-like assassination techniques were widely employed in 17th- and 18th-century India, particularly by the alleged Thuggee cult. Practitioners used a yellow silk or cloth scarf called a rumāl. The Indian version of the garrote frequently incorporates a knot at the center intended to aid in crushing the larynx, decreasing the communication capabilities of the victim, while someone applies pressure to the victim's back, usually using a foot or knee.

== Execution device ==
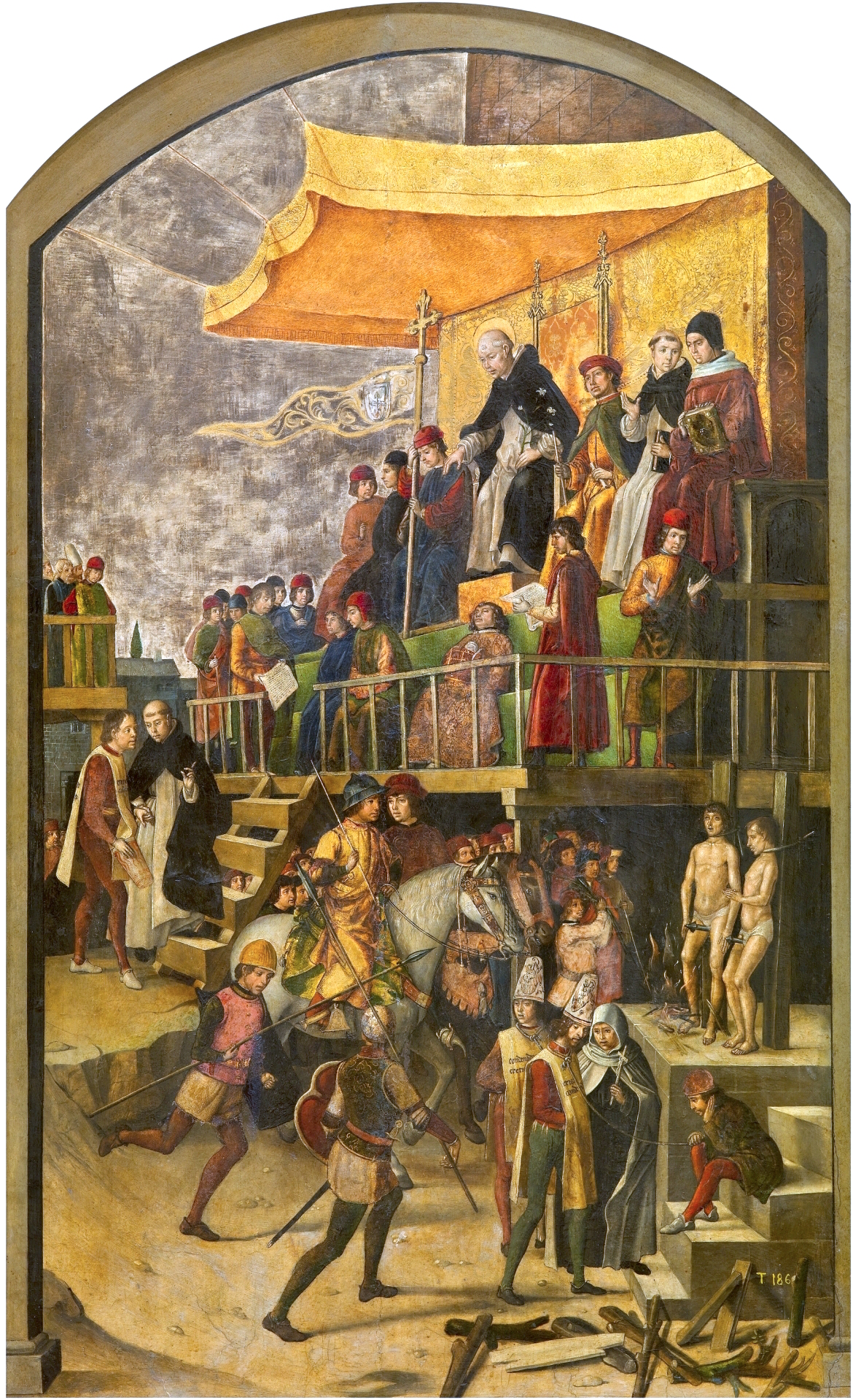
In this 15th-century depiction of the burning of Albigensians after an auto da fé. The condemned had been garroted previously. It is one of the first depictions of a garrote. Pedro Berruguete, Saint Dominic Presiding over an Auto-da-fé.

The garrote (Latin: laqueus) is known to have been used in the first century BC in Rome. It is referred to in accounts of the Second Catilinian Conspiracy, where conspirators including Publius Cornelius Lentulus Sura were strangled with a laqueus in the Tullianum, and the implement is shown in some early reliefs. (Note: E.g. Répertoire de Reliefs grecs et romains, tome I, p. 341 (1919)) It was also used in the Middle Ages in Spain and Portugal. It was employed during the conquista of the Americas, notably in the execution of the Inca emperor Atahualpa.

It was intended as a more merciful form of execution than death by burning; heretics, who converted to Christianity after their conviction, would receive a quick strangulation from the Spanish Inquisition. A later version of the garrote used an iron collar with a large metal screw in the back. The theory was that when the screw was tightened, it would crush the brain stem and kill the victim instantly; however, if the screw missed the point where the brain meets the spinal column, it would simply bore into the victim's neck while they were strangled by the iron collar.

In the Ottoman Empire, execution by strangulation was reserved for very high officials and members of the ruling family. Unlike the Spanish version, a bowstring was used instead of a tightening collar.

During the Peninsular War of 1808–1814, French forces regularly used the garrote to execute Spanish guerrilleros, priests, and other opponents of Napoleonic rule. Around 1810 the earliest known metallic garrote appeared in Spain, and on 28 April 1828, the garrote was declared the sole method of executing civilians in that country. In May 1897, the last public garrotting in Spain was performed in Barcelona. After that, all executions were performed inside prisons.

== Abolition ==
The last civilian executions in Spain, both by garrotting, were those of the poisoner Pilar Prades in May 1959 and the spree killer José María Jarabo in July 1959. Recent legislation had placed many crimes (such as robbery–murder) under military jurisdiction; thus, prosecutors rarely requested civilian executions. Military executions were still performed in Spain until the 1970s. The garrottings of Heinz Chez (real name Georg Michael Welzel) and Salvador Puig Antich in March 1974, both convicted in the Francoist State of killing police officers, were the last state-sanctioned garrottings in the world.

With the 1973 Penal Code, prosecutors once again started requesting execution in civilian cases, but the death penalty was abolished in 1978 after dictator Francisco Franco's death. The last man to be sentenced to death by garrotting was José Luis Cerveto "the murderer of Pedralbes" in October 1977, for a double robbery–murder in May 1974. Cerveto requested execution, but his sentence was commuted. Another prisoner whose civilian death sentence was commuted was businessman Juan Ballot, for the contract killing of his wife in Navarre in November 1973.

After the death penalty was abolished in Spain, the writer Camilo José Cela obtained a garrote, which had probably been used for the execution of Puig Antich, from the General Council of the Judiciary (Consejo General del Poder Judicial) to display at his foundation. The device was kept in storage in Barcelona, and was displayed in the room that the Cela Foundation devoted to his novel The Family of Pascual Duarte, (Note: Title in Spanish: La familia de Pascual Duarte) until Puig Antich's family asked for its removal.

In 1990, Andorra became the last country to officially abolish the death penalty by garrotting, though this method had not been employed there since the late 19th century.

== Notable deaths by garrotting ==
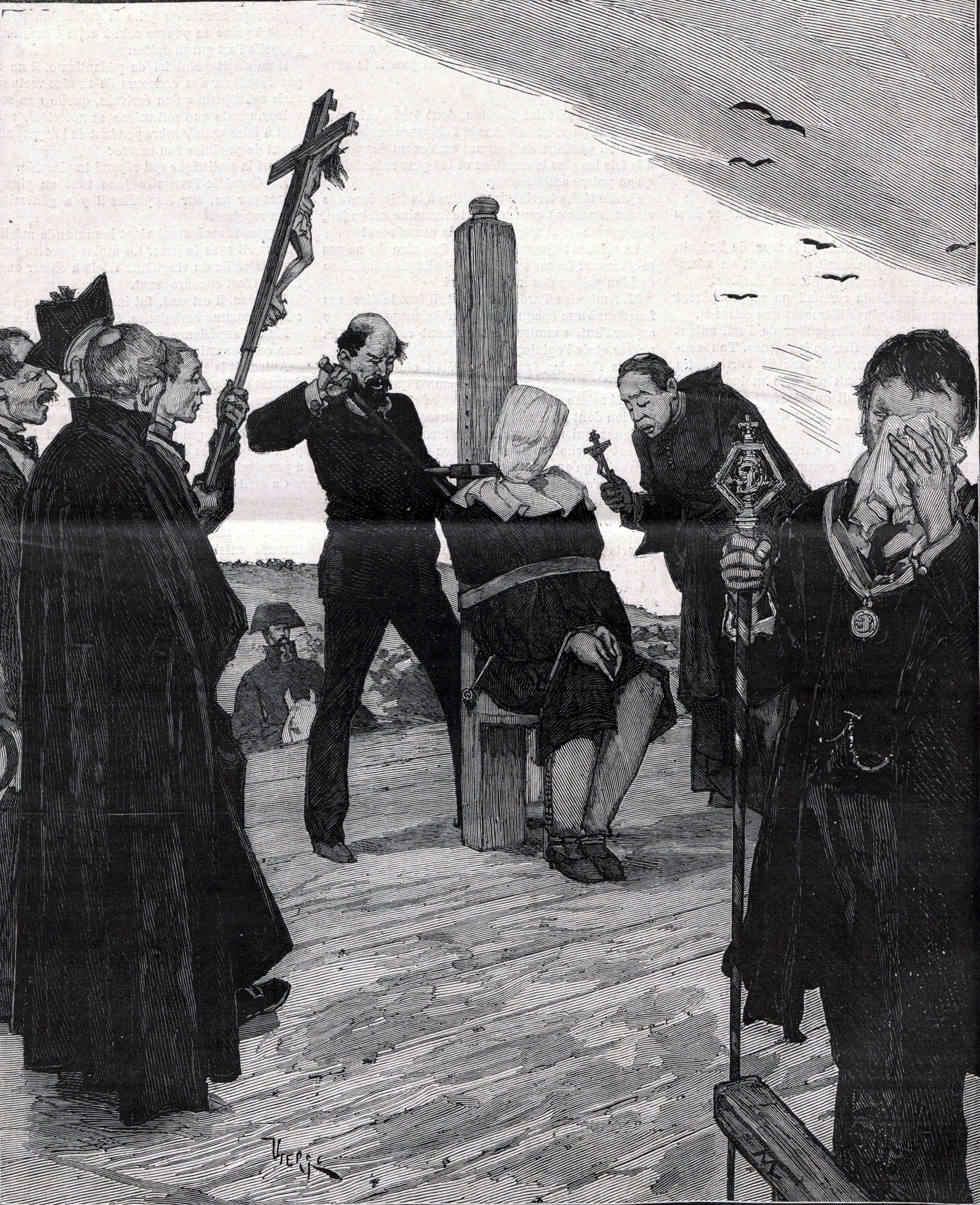
Execution by garrote in Spain

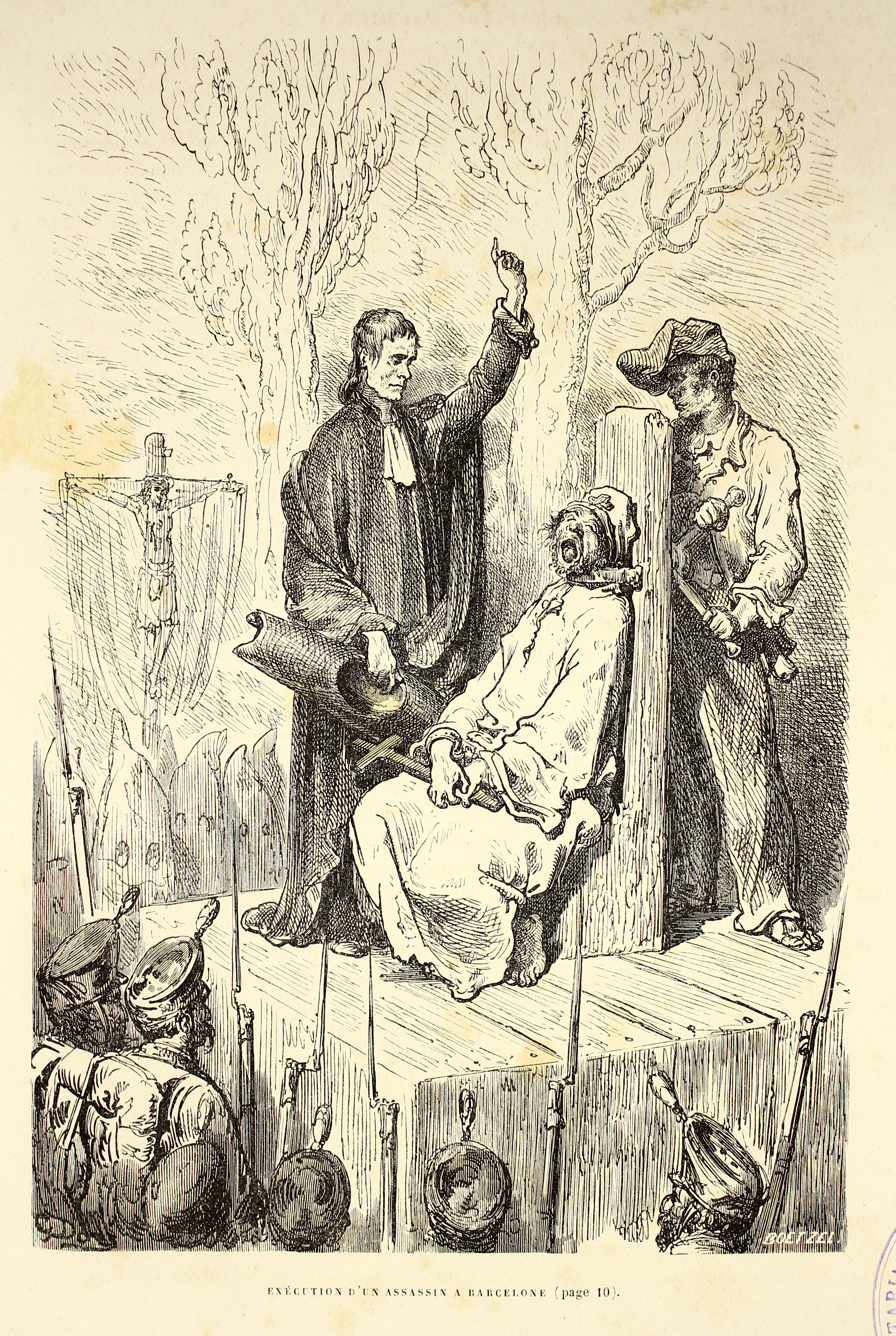
Execution by garrote of a murderer in Barcelona

Name	Year	Reference
Publius Cornelius Lentulus Sura	63 BC	
Atahualpa	1533	
Diego de Almagro	1538	
Şehzade Bayezid	1561	
Agnes Sampson	1591	
Luis de Carvajal the Younger	1596	
Kara Mustafa Pasha	1683	
António José da Silva	1739	
Tomasa Tito Condemayta	1781	
Leonardo Bravo	1812	
Francisco Javier de Elío	1822	
Mariana de Pineda Muñoz	1831	
Luis Candelas	1837	
Narciso López	1851	
Martín Merino y Gómez	1852	
José Apolonio Burgos	1872	
Mariano Gomez	1872	
Jacinto Zamora	1872	
Francisco Otero González	1880	
Juan Díaz de Garayo	1881	
Michele Angiolillo	1897	
Francisco de Dios Piqueras	1924	
Honorio Sánchez Molina	1924	
José María Sánchez Navarrete	1924	
Agapito García Atadell	1937	
Benigno Andrade	1952	
Abdurrahman Fatalibeyli	1954	
Lorenzo Castro	1956	
Juan Vázquez Pérez	1956	
Julio López Guixot	1958	
Pilar Prades	1959	
Juan García Suárez	1959	
José María Jarabo	1959	
Heinz Chez	1974	
Salvador Puig Antich	1974	
