= Pantopon =

Preparation of opiates

Pantopon, also known as Opium Alkaloids Hydrochlorides, is a preparation of opiates made up of all of the alkaloids present in opium in their natural proportions as hydrochlorides salts. It can sometimes be tolerated by people who are allergic to morphine.

Pantopon is prepared by treating standardized medicinal opium with hydrochloric acid or, more commonly, mixing 20 parts morphine HCl, 5 parts codeine, 6 parts thebaine, 8 parts noscapine, 2 parts narcotine, 6 parts miscellaneous alkaloids hydrochlorides.

Pantopon is, in other words, opium with all of the tar and other insolubles removed in an injectable form which, by weight, is nearly as potent as morphine. It was invented in 1909 by the Hoffmann-La Roche pharmaceutical company. Other drugs of the same type have included in the opium alkaloid hydrobromides, sulfates, phosphates, and valerates. "Opium in a syringe " and "Injectable Whole Opium" were common advertising slogans for the product from Roche. An example of similar product to Pantopon is Omnopon, which contains morphine, codeine, and papaverine.

== Society and culture ==
Pantopon gave its name to the poem "Pantopon Rose" by the American writer William Burroughs and to a song with the same name by the Northern Ireland alternative metal band Therapy? on their 1994 album Troublegum. Pantopon also gave its name to the 1996 Mexican documentary Rosa Pantopon.
