= Tertulia =

Social gathering with literary or artistic overtones

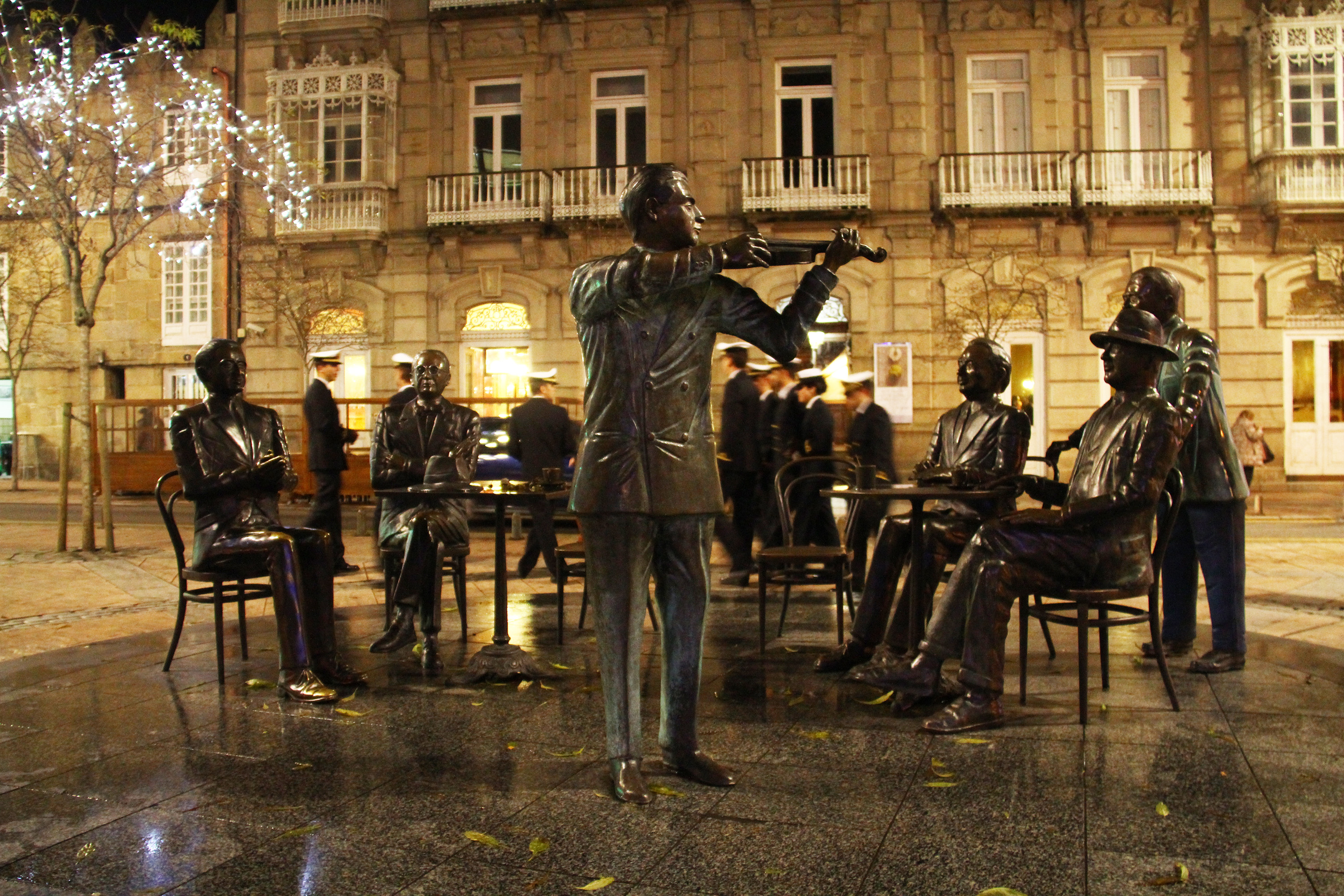
Tertulia

A tertulia (Spanish: [teɾˈtulja], Galician: [teɾˈtuljɐ]; Portuguese: tertúlia [tɨɾˈtuliɐ]; Catalan: tertúlia [təɾˈtuliə]) is a social gathering with literary or artistic overtones, especially in Iberia or in Spanish America. The word can also mean an informal meeting of people to talk about current affairs, arts, etc. The word is originally Spanish, and was later borrowed into Catalan and Portuguese. It is typically not used in English outside of an Iberian or Latin American cultural context.

Occasionally, a tertulia may also describe a television magazine or chat show programme in a similar (albeit perhaps more sensationalist) format to its older counterpart. Less flatteringly, the term tertuliano has been translated to mean something akin to the chattering classes in English.

== Format ==
A tertulia is rather similar to a salon, but a typical tertulia in recent centuries has been a regularly scheduled event in a public place such as a bar, although some tertulias are held in more private spaces, such as someone's living room. Participants, known as contertulios or tertulianos, may share their recent creations such as poetry, short stories, other writings, and even artwork or songs. Usually, but not always, the participants in a regularly scheduled tertulia are in some respects like-minded, with similar political or literary tastes.

== Etymology ==
The Diccionario de la lengua española states that the etymology of the word "tertulia" is uncertain, though it may be derived from the name of the early Christian apologist Tertullian.

== In Spanish America ==
Before 1810, at the tertulias held at the houses of society women in Buenos Aires, such as Mercedes de Lasalde Riglos, Mariquita Sánchez de Thompson and Flora Azcuénaga, the discussions led up to the May Revolution, the first stage in the struggle for Argentine independence from Spain. "Madame Riglos" could be seen as the chief lady of the Tory (conservative) faction in Buenos Aires. She was sparkling and familiar, although highly aristocratic. Doña Melchora de Sarratea, queen of fashion and of the Buenos Aires salons, was so well aware of public and private affairs that she was held to be an enthusiastic supporter of Whig (liberal) principles. Mariquita Sánchez de Thompson's forte was foreign relations. Similar tertulias were being held during this period in Lima, Peru, by women such as Manuela Rábago de Avellafuertes de Riglos and Narcisa Arias de Saavaedra.

José Antonio Wilde (1813–1887) described Buenos Aires in the period immediately following independence. He wrote that it was a widespread custom among the more notable and well-to-do families, and also with many decent families, to hold tertulias at least once a week. Usually the guests danced only from 8:00 to 12:00 at night, in which case only mate was served, but if it went on later chocolate would be added. Dress was not elaborate, and dancing, music and conversation were the only entertainment, so the cost was low. A piano player might be hired, or the young people might play dance pieces, or some old and complacent aunt might play some contradanza. Even if it was old, the thing was to dance.

== List ==
- El Parnasillo
- Gambrinus (tertulia)
- Grupo do Leão
- Tertulia de Creadores
- Tertulia de Nava
- Tertulia de Pombo
- Tertulia de San Gregorio
- Tertulia de la Fonda de San Sebastián
- Tertulia del Niké
- Tertulia del Salón
- Tertulia Feminista Les Comadres

== See also ==
- Café de tertulia: such as the Café de las Salesas, the Café Gijón, and the Café Comercial, popular cafés de tertulia in Madrid
- Chingana
- Pulqueria
- Stammtisch
- Tertullian
- Viennese café

== Sources ==
- Davies, Catherine; Brewster, Claire; Owen, Hilary (2006), South American Independence: Gender, Politics, Text, Liverpool University Press, ISBN 978-1-84631-027-0
- "Ellas también hicieron el 25 de Mayo", Cartelera de Historia (in Spanish), 26 May 2008
- "Etimología de Tertulia", .dechile.net (in Spanish)
- Galasso, Norberto (1994), La Revolución de Mayo: el pueblo quiere saber de qué se trató (in Spanish), Ediciones Colihue SRL, ISBN 978-950-581-798-6
- Wilde, José Antonio (1908), "XVI", Buenos Aires desde setenta años atrás (in Spanish)
- "tertulia", Diccionario de la lengua española (in Spanish), Royal Spanish Academy
