= Communist Party of Spain (Marxist–Leninist) (historical) =

Communist Party of Spain (Marxist-Leninist) Partido Comunista de España (marxista-leninista)
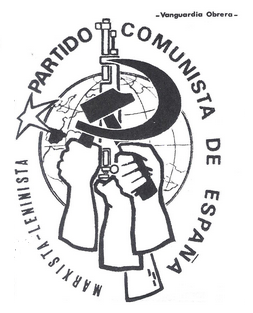
- Founder: Elena Ódena, Raúl Marco and other people split off from the Communist Party of Spain
- Founded: 1964; 2006
- Dissolved: 1992
- Merger of: Merger of Communist Party of Spain (PCE) splinter groups
- Merged into: Together with Spanish National Liberation Front and Vanguardia Socialista gave origin to the Revolutionary and Patriotic Antifascist Front (FRAP)
- Headquarters: Spain
- Newspaper: Revolución Española; Vanguardia obrera "Octubre" (current)
- Youth wing: Communist Youth of Spain (Marxist–Leninist)
- Affiliated union: Oposición Sindical Obrera (1964-1977); Asociación Obrera Asambleista (1977-1992)
- Student: Federación Universitaria Democrática Española (1967-1968)
- Affiliated artists: Unión Popular de Artistas
- Legal wing: Republican Left (1979-1981)
- Ideology: Communism; Marxism-Leninism; Anti-Francoism; Republicanism; Hoxhaism (1976-1992); Anti-revisionism; Proletarian internationalism
- National affiliation: Convención Republicana de los Pueblos de España (1976-1983)
- International affiliation: Aligned with the Albanian Party of Labour (1964-1992); International Conference of Marxist–Leninist Parties and Organizations (Unity & Struggle) (current)
- Armed wing (1973-1977): Revolutionary Antifascist Patriotic Front
- Colors: Red
- Town councillors (1979-1983): 5 / 67,505

Party flag

Website
- https://pceml.info/actual/

The Communist Party of Spain (Marxist-Leninist) (in Spanish: Partido Comunista de España (marxista-leninista), PCE (m-l)) is a communist political party in Spain, formed in 1964 through the merger of splinter groups of the Communist Party of Spain (PCE).

PCE(m-l) followed the line of the Chinese Communist Party and Maoism until it took the side of the Party of Labour of Albania, which granted it official recognition, against the Chinese, during the events that led to the Sino-Albanian split.

== History ==
The PCE(m-l) party was formed by communists dissatisfied that the Communist Party of Spain, under the leadership of Santiago Carrillo, had abandoned the armed struggle in 1964. It remained small throughout its existence and in 1968 it shrank further when a sector of its militants abandoned the party to join the Organisation of Marxist–Leninists of Spain.

In January 1971, at the time when the need was felt to renew the fight against the Francoist rule of Spain, the then Communist Party of Spain (Marxist–Leninist), together with the Spanish National Liberation Front (FELN) and Vanguardia Socialista, took part in the foundation of the Revolutionary and Patriotic Antifascist Front (FRAP) at a meeting in Paris held in a house owned by American writer Arthur Miller. The PCE(m-l) launched then the Coordinating Committee of the Revolutionary Antifascist Patriotic Front, which held its constituent conference in 1974, and was designed to coordinate student insurrections against the Francisco Franco dictatorial regime based on the model of the student demonstrations of May 1968 in France. Initially the Front was led by Julio Álvarez del Vayo, FELN leader and a former member of the Spanish Socialist Workers' Party.

Other fronts of PCE(m-l) were:

- Convención Republicana de los Pueblos de España
- Juventud Comunista de España (marxista-leninista)
- Federación Universitaria Democrática Española
- Unión Popular Antifascista

PCE(m-l) published Revolución Española. In 1977, during the Spanish transition to democracy, it started publishing Vanguardia obrera as the organ of the Central Committee of the party.

The party was legalized in 1981. That year, a split surged in the party, with a dissident group forming a parallel PCE(m-l) and publishing its own version of Vanguardia obrera.

The sixth and last congress of PCE(m-l) was held in 1992, voting to dissolve the party. An agreement was made to form a new group, the Partido Comunista Democratico, but that was never carried out. The main leader of PCE(m-l), Raúl Marco, had broken away in 1991 to form the Colectivo Octubre, which evolved into Organización Comunista Octubre.

The Organización Comunista Octubre merged with a number of other regional splits from the PCE (m-l) to form the Comité Estatal de Organizaciones Comunistas (CEOC).

The CEOC with four other communist organizations merged in 2007 to form the re-founded PCE(m-l). The new PCE (m-l) continues the Hoxhaist line of the old PCE (m-l) and is an active member of the ICMLPO, an international grouping of Hoxhaist communist parties.

== Election results ==
Congreso de los Diputados
Election	Votes	%	Seats	Notes
1982	23,186	0.11%	0 / 350	
1986	27,473	0.14%	0 / 350	as part of the Republican Popular Unity

== Congresses of PCE(m-l) ==
- 1st congress: 1973, Madrid
- 2nd congress: 1977, Madrid
- 3rd congress: 1979, Madrid
- 4th congress: 1984
- 5th congress
- 6th congress: 1992

== See also ==
- List of anti-revisionist groups
