= Burgos trials =

1970 Military tribunals held in Burgos

- Court: Military tribunals in Burgos
- Decided: 28 December 1970

Case history
- Subsequent actions: Six death sentences, later commuted to 30 years in prison

Keywords
- terrorism; Basque nationalism; separatism; torture; show trial

The Burgos trials (Spanish: Proceso de Burgos) were a series of military tribunals held in the Spanish city of Burgos from 3 to 9 December 1970. The trials prosecuted 16 members of the Basque separatist organisation Euskadi Ta Askatasuna (ETA) for their involvement in two murders of police officers in 1968. Causing international outrage and sympathy for the defendants, the trials are best known for the six death sentences handed out by the tribunals which were later commuted to lengthy prison sentences.

Widespread popular support for the defendants among the Basque public manifested itself in the weeks leading up to the trial. A labour strike by around 100,000 Basque workers, and the kidnapping by ETA of a German honorary consul, contributed to the significant media attention around the trials. In their statements, the defendants sought to portray their organisation as an advocate of the working classes. They also detailed incidents of torture they had experienced in prison.

On 28 December, the tribunals found all defendants guilty of the crimes of which they were accused. Six of them were sentenced to death. However, reacting to international pressure, the Spanish dictator Francisco Franco commuted the sentences to long imprisonment terms. Sparking condemnations from public figures including Pope Paul VI and Jean-Paul Sartre, the Burgos trials gained notoriety for being "one of the last occasions on which political prisoners were sentenced to [death]."

== Murders of 1968 ==
The trial at Burgos was in part a reaction to ETA's first known murders, committed in 1968. The first incident occurred on 7 June of that year when two of the organisation's members, Txabi Etxebarrieta and Iñaki Sarasketa were stopped by a traffic control near Amasa-Villabona. When prompted to present the car documents by José Pardines, one of the controlling police officers, Etxebarrieta opened fire and killed the officer. On the same day, the men were again stopped by police near Tolosa. Sarasketa was arrested while Etxebarrieta was killed in retaliation for the murder of Pardines. The extrajudicial killing of Etxebarrieta elicited widespread outrage among the Basque populace.

Two months later, on 2 August 1968, ETA committed its first premeditated murder by assassinating Melitón Manzanas, local commander of the Brigada Político-Social accused of torturing Basque detainees, at his residence in San Sebastián. Intended as a retaliation for the death of Etxebarrieta, the murder provoked a harsh reaction from the Spanish authorities: constitutional rights for the province of Gipuzkoa were suspended and by the end of the year many members of ETA had been arrested.

== Buildup to the trial ==
In August 1970, the Spanish government resolved to hold a military tribunal, whose task was to convict the members of the ETA involved in the crimes of the preceding years. 16 people were accused of complicity in the crimes. (Note: While 16 is given as the number of defendants, sources provide varying lists of names.) Their occupations were varied: two of the sixteen were priests, and there were several ex-seminarists, as well as manual workers, clerks, and teachers. None were from upper class backgrounds.

The prosecution demanded the death penalty for six defendants for their alleged leadership in the murder of Melitón Manzanas. ETA member Iker Casanova, who was imprisoned from 2000 to 2011 for his activities in connection with the organization, gives their names as Jokin Gorostidi, Teo Uriarte, Mario Onaindia, Xabier Izko, and Larena and Unai Dorronsoro.

With the trial the government sought to continue its successful campaign against ETA which had resulted in the arrest of many of the group's leaders in 1969. Although mainstream media attempted to portray the defendants as "members of an isolated terrorist band", the trial generated widespread popular support for ETA among the Basque public. According to Casanova, this was aided by ETA's efforts to distribute pamphlets and other tokens of protest against the trial in the weeks leading up the trial date. By the time of the trial, about 100,000 workers in the cities of the Basque Country were on strike, while the court-martial proceeded with 15 defendants (one, Maria Aranzazu, had her charges dropped). The situation had escalated to such an extent that the government was forced to enact a state of emergency for the province of Gipuzkoa.

Up until its beginning, ETA tried to compromise the trial through paramilitary action; according to Casanova, a tunnel that they had dug underneath the prison in which the defendants were held failed to break through a concrete wall. On the other hand, efforts to kidnap the West-German honorary consul Eugen Beihl were successful. While ETA demanded that all planned death penalties be commuted, they eventually released Beihl after 25 days without a clear indication that their demands would be met.

== Trial ==
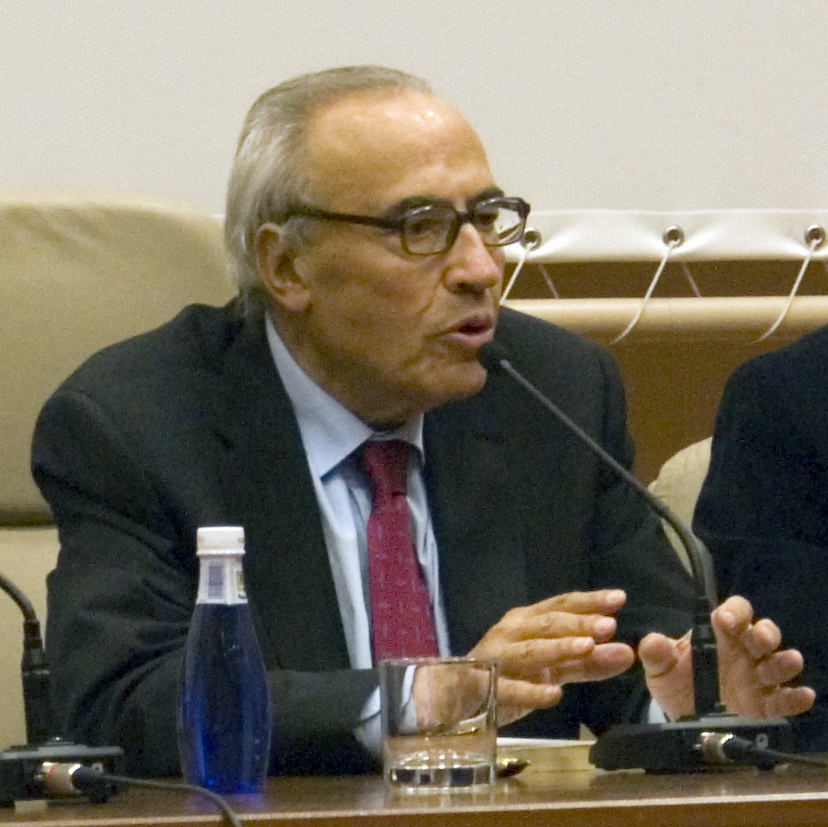
Gregorio Peces-Barba, one of the defence's attorneys

The planned military tribunal was convened in the northwestern city of Burgos in Castile and León on 3 December 1970. In a bid to showcase its new internationalist attitude, ETA hired a group of prominent left-leaning lawyers. They included the future co-author of the Spanish constitution Gregorio Peces-Barba, the political theorist José Antonio Etxebarrieta, and the future senator Juan María Bandrés. The defence's strategy was to use the highly publicised trial as a platform for criticism of the regime of Francisco Franco and its oppression of dissenters and ethnic minorities.

As the trial focused on events which occurred between 1968 and 1969, it was "not generally understood" that ETA had since split into several factions. Splinter groups ETA-V and ETA-IV issued contradictory reports to the press, which "only added to the confusion".

During its first four days, the trial heard statements from the defendants. In a 2015 book, the historian John Sullivan said:

[The statements] seemed to show that ETA had been transformed into a Marxist-Leninist organization which, while it confined its activities to Euskadi, sympathised equally with the oppressed elsewhere in Spain, and had completely abandoned anti-Spanish chauvinism.

Some, however, took a "more traditional nationalist stance", including declaring that ETA was a "movement of national liberation". They also recounted incidents of torture experienced at the hands of the Spanish military police. According to historian Luis Castells, the trials thus became "a milestone in the anti-Franco struggle", generating "an unreleased mobilization in the Basque Country, in Spain and internationally".

On 7 December, the trial was interrupted because one of the presiding officers had fallen ill. When proceedings resumed the following day, the tribunal adopted a more rigid approach, suppressing statements not related to the accessions to prevent further digressions by the defendants. In response, most of them exercised their right to remain silent. However, the final defendant to speak, Mario Onaindia attempted to attack the tribunal with an axe. Onaindia was overpowered quickly; during the struggle, the rest of the prisoners stood up and sang the Basque soldiers' anthem, and the incident became subject to significant foreign media coverage. Afterwards, the court was reconvened, with the press and public excluded.

== Verdict ==
After proceedings had ended on 9 December 1970, the tribunal took several days to deliberate and announced its verdict on 28 December. All the prosecution's demands were granted: six defendants were sentenced to death, and three were sentenced to a symbolic "second execution". The remaining defendants were sentenced to lengthy prison terms. However, domestic and international observers, including the Vatican, criticised the Spanish government for what was perceived as an exceedingly harsh judgement.

On 30 December, Franco commuted all death penalties to prison sentences of 30 years, except the "double death sentences", which were commuted to 60-year sentences, to which were added various other sentences ranging from 20 to 30 years. While some of the sentences reached 80 to 90 years, the New York Times described these as "theoretical", noting that Spanish law at the time prohibited prison sentences longer than 30 years.

== Aftermath ==
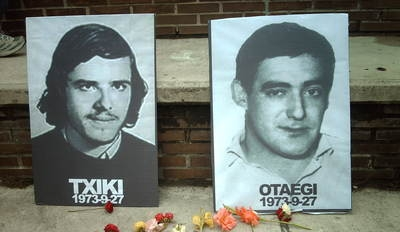
Juan Paredes Manot and Ángel Otaegui were executed five years after the Burgos trials.

The Burgos trials turned out to be a debacle for the Spanish government. ETA, a separatist organisation of little relevance outside Spain before the trial, became a symbol of the opposition against the dictatorship for the international public. The group began to attract support from civil society, including the Basque Nationalist Party, the Spanish Communist Party and the Catholic Church. Franco's decision to commute the proposed death penalties was greeted with relief by the international community. The Holy See was reported to have received the news "with particular satisfaction" after Pope Paul VI had advocated for the defendants' lives. The trials nevertheless gained notoriety for being "one of the last occasions on which political prisoners were sentenced to death." In the preface to a book (Le procès de Burgos) published soon after the events, the philosopher Jean-Paul Sartre praised the defendants for showcasing the predicament of the Basque people to the world.

In the decade following the trials, ETA continued its attacks on public sector targets. In December 1973, the group planted a bomb that killed Luis Carrero Blanco, the Prime Minister of Spain and likely successor to Franco. The following year, an explosion at a Madrid bar frequently visited by police officers, killing at least 12 people, was attributed to its members. Despite the condemnation of the Burgos trials, a similar trial was held against two members of ETA and three members of Frente Revolucionario Antifascista y Patriótico (FRAP) in September 1975, resulting in the execution of five people (including ETA members Juan Paredes Manot and Ángel Otaegui). These executions were the last use of capital punishment in Spain.

== Bibliography ==
- Casanova, Iker (2007). ETA: 1958–2008. Medio siglo de historia. Tafalla. ISBN 978-8481365078.
- Halimi, Gisèle (1971). Le procès de Burgos. Paris. ISBN 978-2070279487.
- Muro, Diego (2013). Ethnicity and Violence: The Case of Radical Basque Nationalism. New York. ISBN 9781134167692.
- Sullivan, John (2015). ETA and Basque Nationalism. New York. ISBN 9781317479604.
