= Organización Obreira =

Workers' Organization Organización Obreira
- Secretary-General: Xosé Anxo García Méndez
- Founded: 1972
- Dissolved: 1974
- Paramilitary wing: Frente Militar
- Membership: More than 100
- Ideology: Communism; Marxism-leninism; Anti-revisionism; Galicianism
- Political position: Radical left
- Trade union affiliation: Workers' Commissions (CCOO)

Organización Obreira (in English: Workers' Organization or Working Class Organization) was a clandestine leninist political organization in Galiza founded in April 1972. Organización Obreira had two official magazines: O Noso Mañán (Our Tomorrow, directed to seaman) and Organización Obreira. The group was very influential in the area of Vigo, specially in the local Workers' Commissions.

== Organization ==
Organización Obreira was led by an executive committee of 10 members. Xosé Anxo García Méndez was the secretary general of the organization and there were three area committees in the area of Vigo, where the organization was quite strong. The committees were known as CZ1 (divided in four cells), CZ2 (3 cells) and CZ3 (2 cells). The organization had around 100 "core" militants, with cells in all the cities of Galiza. The organization had a Military Front, a structure with a defensive character, led by Abelardo Collazo (Note: That would later become one of the leaders of the GRAPO.) and Hierro Chomón.

== History ==
Organización Obreira emerged in April 1972 from a split of the PCE in Vigo, composed of around 50 workers that were members of CCOO and the Communist Youth, dissatisfied with the Pact for Freedom signed by the party the same year, that called for the unity of all leftists, regardless of their class, to defeat Francisco Franco and the Spanish State.

Organización Obreira achieved protagonism during the Vigo general strike of 1972, that shut down the city for one whole month, growing in popularity and membership. Despite this, the party lost influence due to the repression of the regime.

In late 1973 Organización Obreira lived an internal conflict between the supporters of joining the Organisation of Marxist–Leninists of Spain (OMLE) and those who wanted to join the Galician People's Union (UPG). Finally, in 1974, Organización Obreira disappeared as one sector joined the OMLE, which was the origin of the Communist Party of Spain (Reconstituted) (PCE(r)) and the GRAPO, and another part joined the UPG.
