= Spain–Albania Friendship Association =

Communist organization based in Spain

Spain–Albania Friendship Association (Spanish: Asociación de Amistad España-Albania) was an organization based in Spain. The association was recognized by the government of Socialist Albania. The organization was linked to the Communist Party of Spain (Marxist-Leninist). In 1979, the organization began publishing Drita Albania (La Luz de Albania).
