= Oposición Sindical Obrera =

OSO
- Opposición Sindical Obrera
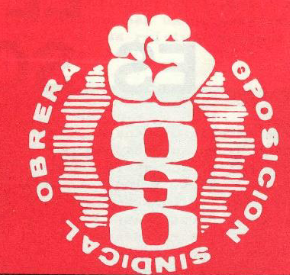
- Founded: Late 50s
- Dissolved: 1977; Transformed in the Asociación Obrera Asambleista.
- Location: Spain
- Linked to the PCE first, later to the PCE (m-l) and to the FRAP.

Oposición Sindical Obrera ("Working Class Union Opposition", abbreviated OSO) was a clandestine trade union movement in Spain. OSO was originally tied to the Communist Party of Spain (PCE). Many of its members participated in vertical union elections of 1963 in order to infiltrate the official regime union, including Marcelino Camacho. OSO is considered the precedent for the Workers' Commissions (CCOO). In the mid 60's the PCE abandoned the OSO in favour of the more successful CCOO. When the PCE abandoned the organization the PCE (m-l), a 1964 maoist split of the PCE took over the OSO and transformed it in its affiliated union. OSO disappeared in 1977 when it was transformed in the Asociación Obrera Asambleista (AOA).
