= OMLE =

OMLE is a four-letter acronym that can be used to signify:

- Bolshevik–Leninist Organization of Greece
- Organisation of Marxists–Leninists of Greece
- Organisation of Marxist–Leninists of Spain
