= 1979 Madrid bombing =

1979 Madrid bombing may refer to:

- May 1979 Madrid bombing
- July 1979 Madrid bombings
