= Gabriela Abad Miró =

Spanish politician and teacher

- Born: 1915; Alcoy, Spain
- Died: January 24, 1941 (aged 25–26); Mexico City, Mexico
- Other name: Gabrielilla
- Education: University of Madrid
- Occupations: Politician, teacher

Gabriela Abad Miró (Alcoy, Spain, 1915 – Mexico City, January 24, 1941), also known as Gabrielilla, was a Spanish politician and teacher.

She earned a degree in philosophy from the University of Madrid.

== Political career ==
Gabriela Abad was a leader in the Communist Youth of Spain, associated with the Spanish Communist Party (PCE) and the Unified Socialist Youth (JSU). During the Spanish Civil War, she held various roles in social and political organizations. Abad was responsible for social action policy in the Madrid Committee and participated in the social activities of the Fifth Regiment (1936–1937). She also contributed to the work of the International Red Aid in Madrid (1938–1939) and served as secretary of the committee at the Châteaubriant internment camp in France in 1939.

She was a friend and collaborator of Tina Modotti, who was responsible for the International Red Aid in Spain, and a companion of Vittorio Vidali. According to a police report about her brother Santiago, dated July 9, 1947, she had been a member of the University Federation (FUE), and was part of the Propaganda Commission and the Political Bureau of the PCE. She served as a commander and brigade commissar at the Madrid front, escaped Spain at the end of the Civil War, and went into exile in 1939 in Mexico City, where she died in 1941 from sepsis.
