= General Police Corps =

Law enforcement institution during the Francoist Spain

General Police Corps Cuerpo General de Policía
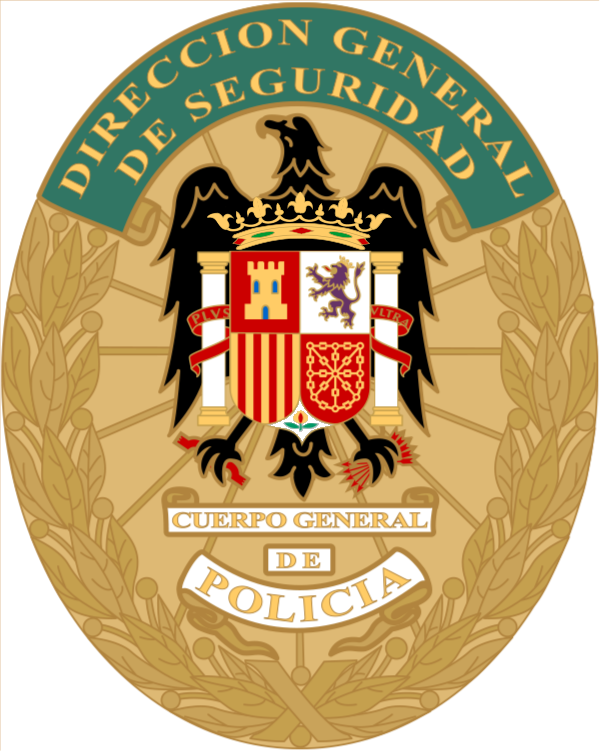
- The 1972 emblem of the CGP
- Abbreviation: CGP

Agency overview
- Formed: 8 March 1941
- Preceding agency: Cuerpo de Vigilancia
- Dissolved: 4 December 1978
- Superseding agency: Cuerpo Superior de Policía
- Employees: 8,200 (1968 est.)

Jurisdictional structure
- National agency: Francoist Spain
- Operations jurisdiction: Francoist Spain
- Governing body: Ministry of Governance
- General nature: Civilian police

Operational structure
- Overseen by: Directorate-General for Security
- Headquarters: Madrid

The General Police Corps (Spanish: Cuerpo General de Policía, CGP) was a law enforcement force of Spain established by the Francoist regime in 1941 to conduct criminal investigation and enforce political repression. They should not be confused with the Armed Police Corps, which was responsible for the maintenance of public order.

== History ==
Following the overthrow of the Second Spanish Republic in April 1939, the Francoist Spain initially relied on the Army in order to handle public order issues. By means of two sets of laws issued on 3 August 1939 and 8 March 1941 the Spanish State reorganized the police forces of Spain (namely the Cuerpo de Vigilancia and the Guardia de Asalto) and officially the General Police Corps was created. The selection of the cadres was made between the former members of the police who had passed the purge, and also through a new selection of candidates that was made at the end of the war. The profile of accepted candidates ranged from Spanish Civil War veterans of the Nationalist faction, militants of the Movimiento Nacional or former Guardia de Asalto members.

A section dedicated to the work of secret police, the Political-Social Brigade was also created. The Minister of Governance Blas Pérez González was the main organizer of the Political-Social Brigade in its origins. The commissioner Roberto Conesa became the head of the Political-Social Brigade, being known among the opponents for his brutal methods of interrogation and torture. The policeman Antonio González Pacheco (alias "Billy the Kid") become the right hand of Conesa.

In 1968, the workforce of the CGP consisted of 8,200 members, including inspectors, police officers and officials. In 1974, a "female group" was created, composed of 70 personnel from the administrative and auxiliary bodies, who would be responsible for various functions, such as information, surveillance of persons or searches of women.

During its existence the CGP conducted the investigation of some crimes that had great social echo, as was the case of the murders committed by José María Jarabo, or the crimes of the poisoner of Valencia, Pilar Prades. The CGP also highlighted the case of the anarchist Salvador Puig Antich, who was blamed for the murder of a police inspector and who ended up being executed by the garrote.

During the Spanish transition to democracy, on 4 December 1978, the CGP was reorganized and succeeded by the new Superior Police Corps (CSP) through Law 1978/55. In 1986 the CSP was later on integrated into the current National Police Corps (CNP).

== Organic structure and functions ==
Organically the CGP depended on the Ministry of Governance, although directly it did it through the Directorate-General of Security. Officially, the CGP was in charge of the investigation of crimes, common offenses and conducting political repression. Within its internal organization it had two separate sections:

- Political-Social Brigade, in charge of repression against opposition movements.
- Criminal Investigation Brigade, in charge of investigation of crimes and common offenses.

Regarding questions of public order, police interventions and charges, these were under the exclusive jurisdiction of the Armed Police Corps.

== Rank insignia ==
Although the CGP was a civilian institution, its members could wear uniforms with the rank of their category for official events.

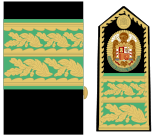
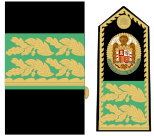
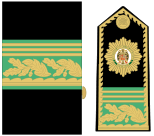
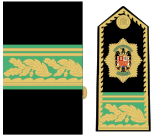
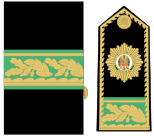
Categories	Command Ranks
Spain
Spain	Principal Commissioner	Commissioner General	1st rank Commissioner	2nd rank Commissioner	3rd rank Commissioner/ Chief Inspector

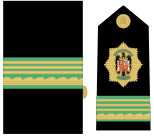
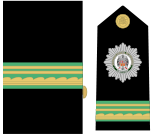
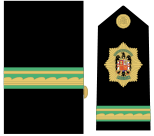
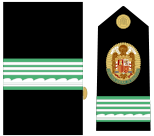
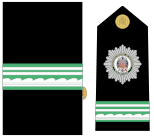
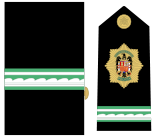
Categories	Executive Ranks			Basic Ranks
Spain
Spain	1st rank Inspector	2nd rank Inspector	3rd rank Inspector	Subinspector/ 1st rank Agent	Subinspector/ 2nd rank Agent	Subinspector/ 3rd rank Agent

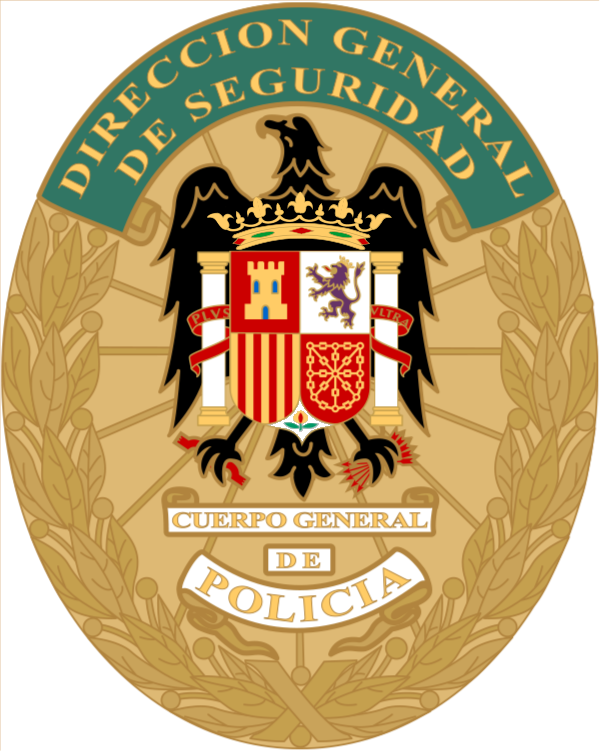
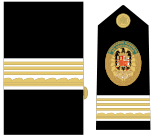
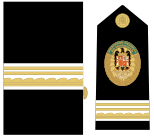
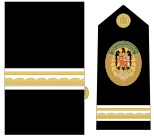
Categories	Basic Ranks (as of 1972)
Spain
Spain	Subinspector/ 1st rank Agent	Subinspector/ 2nd rank Agent	Subinspector/ 3rd rank Agent

== Emblems ==
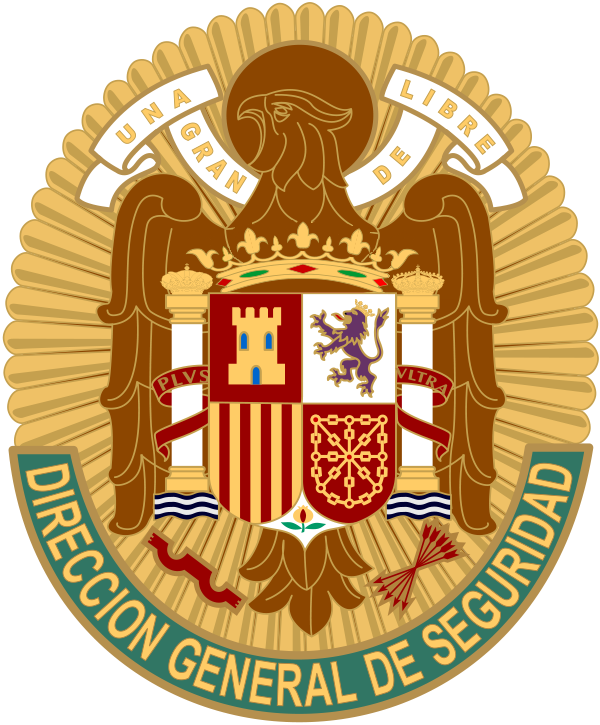
First Emblem (1942).

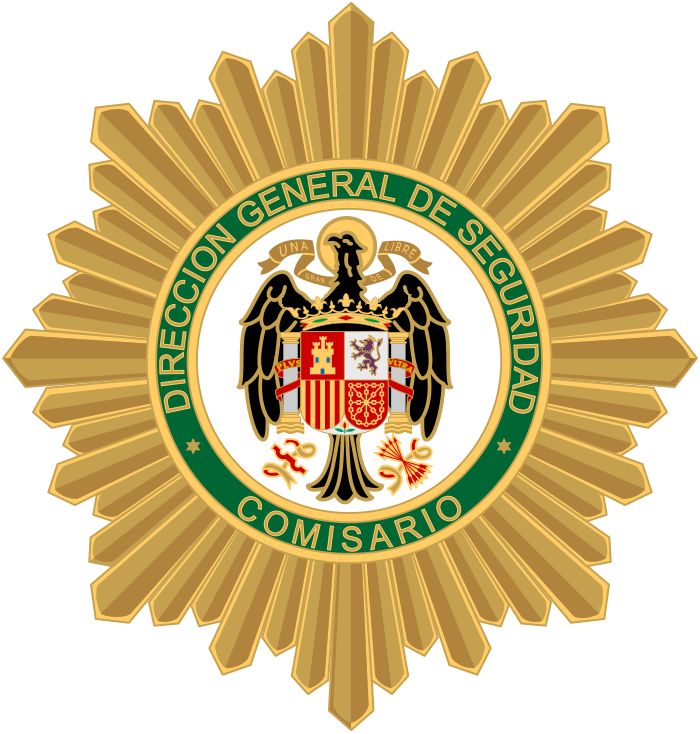
Second Emblem (1954).

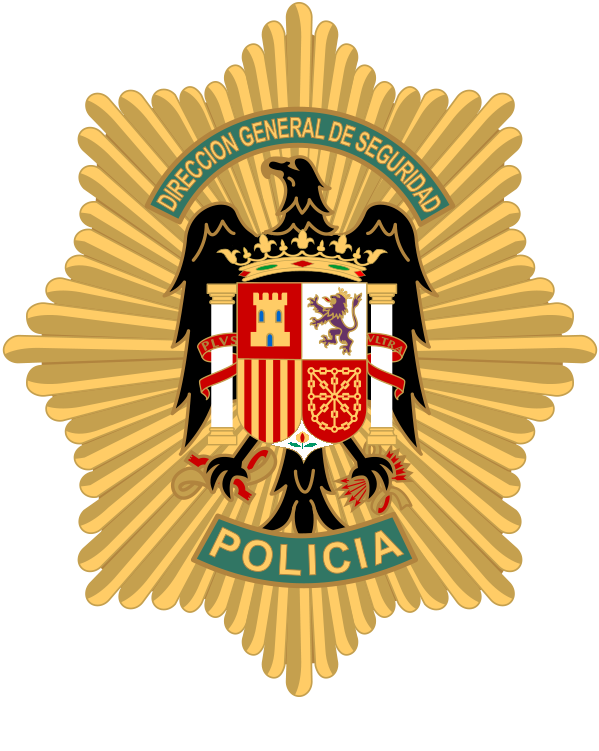
Third Emblem (1962).

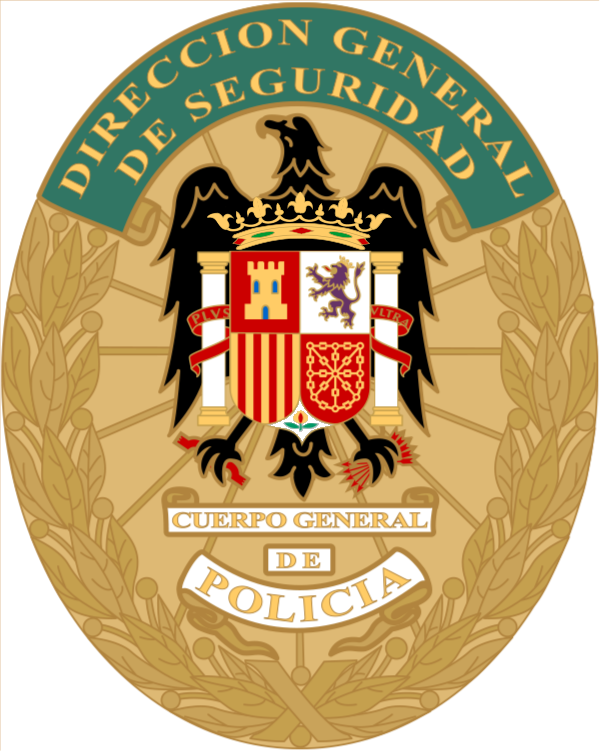
Fourth Emblem (1972).

== See also ==
- Armed Police Corps
- White Terror (Spain)
