= Last use of capital punishment in Spain =

1975 executions in Spain

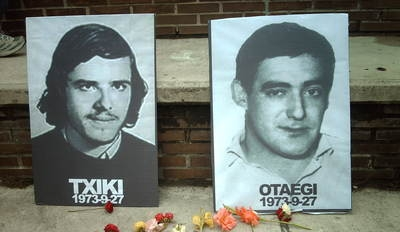
2011 memorial to two of those executed

The last use of capital punishment in Spain took place on 27 September 1975 when two members of the armed left-wing Basque nationalist and separatist group ETA political-military and three members of the Spanish anti-Francoist Marxist–Leninist group Revolutionary Antifascist Patriotic Front (FRAP) were executed by firing squads after having been convicted and sentenced to death by military tribunals for the murder of police officers and civil guards. Spain was Western Europe's only dictatorship at the time of the executions and had been unpopular and internationally isolated in the post-war period due to its relations with Nazi Germany in the 1930s and 1940s and the fact that its far-right autocratic leader, Francisco Franco, had come to power by overthrowing a democratically elected government. As a result, the executions resulted in substantial criticism of the Spanish government, both domestically and abroad. Reactions included street protests, attacks on Spanish embassies, international criticism of the Spanish government and diplomatic measures, such as the withdrawal of the ambassadors of fifteen European countries.

This was the last use of the death penalty in Spain; following the death of Francisco Franco, two months later, no further executions took place. The 1978 Spanish Constitution largely abolished the death penalty, with the exception of limited cases in the military code and also in times of war, and these exceptions were abolished in 1995. In 2012, a Basque Government commission found that the processes used to convict the two Basques that were executed had violated their rights and awarded compensation to their families.

== Background ==
Franco had come to power in 1939 after the Spanish Civil War, during which various factions had committed mass executions of political opponents. Numerous historians, including Helen Graham, Paul Preston, Antony Beevor, Gabriel Jackson, Hugh Thomas, and Ian Gibson believe that the summary executions of political opponents by the Francoist side, which became known as the "White Terror", was a deliberate policy. In contrast, the massive executions their opponents perpetrated in the first months of the war lacked the legal sanction of the Spanish government which Franco was seeking to overthrow. From 25 August 1936 onwards, the government of the Republic established special tribunals, that later evolved into popular tribunals, which, while frequently resorting to the death penalty, typically favored prison terms. In the zone controlled by the rebels, the death penalty, which had been abolished in 1932 for civil cases, was revived by Franco in 1938.

=== Hostility to Spain in the post-war period ===
While Spain was neutral in World War II, Franco's sympathies remained with the Axis powers and he considered entering the war on their side. He maintained good relations with Nazi Germany and many Francoists remained sympathetic to Nazism. This led Spain to be shunned by the international community, especially the Western European democracies and the United States, in the immediate post-war period. Europe-wide popular demonstrations against the Franco government occurred in 1946. In the 1950s, a thawing of relations occurred as Cold War tensions escalated and Franco's hostility to communism made him a reliable ally. This would result in reluctance on the part of the US government to support measures which could destabilise the Franco government.

Following the fall of both the authoritarian government in Portugal and the military junta in Greece in 1974, the Spanish government was the sole surviving dictatorship in Western Europe, where several countries in 1975 were ruled by socialist parties which had long loathed Franco for coming to power by overthrowing a social democratic and democratic socialist government. Hostility to the use of capital punishment was widespread in Western Europe at this time and most Western European countries had ceased using it.

=== Declining use of the death penalty in Spain ===
Although up to 200,000 people were executed during the Spanish Civil War and its immediate aftermath, 48 people were executed in the period from 1948 to the time of the 1975 executions. Of those, 17 were executed by firing squad and 31 by garrotting. Historically, the garrote had been the preferred execution method in Spain, with firing squads used for political and military prisoners.

No executions took place from 1966 to 1972. The Burgos trials of September 1970 sentenced six ETA members to death, but, following international pressure and criticism, Franco commuted the death sentences.

=== New legislation ===
In reaction to left-wing and Basque separatist violence, the government passed a new anti-terrorist law on 26 August 1975. Sympathising with terrorists would now carry a penalty of up to 12 years' imprisonment. The law re-established military tribunals, empowered to order executions of those they found guilty of terrorism against the state. It extended the time that suspects could be held for interrogation from three to five days, with an option of up to 19 days with judicial approval. In response, the European Parliament debated a motion proposed by the Confederation of the Socialist Parties of the European Community condemning the new law as an infringement of human rights and calling for the suspension of relations between the European Economic Community and Spain.

== Trials and sentencing ==
The new law was rapidly enforced. The first military tribunal took place on 28 August 1975 in Castrillo del Val when ETA members José Antonio Garmendia and Ángel Otaegui were sentenced to death for killing civil guard Gregorio Posadas on 3 April 1974 in Azpeitia. Garmendia was accused of shooting Posadas and Otaegui of helping him to flee from police. Garmendia was shot during his interrogations and ended up in a coma. Due to his physical condition, he was unable to sign his confession, instead having his fingerprint placed on a confession which implicated Otaegui. Although witnesses failed to identify Garamendi and doctors testified that he was in no fit state to validate the confession, together with Otaegui, he was found guilty of the charges.

On 11 September 1975, near Hoyo de Manzanares, the trial of five Revolutionary Antifascist Patriotic Front (FRAP) members took place, despite attempts by their lawyers to have it postponed. The lawyers also interrupted the prosecutor's opening statement, claiming that it was wrong and omitted key details. They also believed that their clients could not receive a fair trial due to negative press reports describing them as "assassins."

As a result of the trial, FRAP members VIadimiro Fernández, Manuel Blanco, and José Humberto Baena received the death penalty for the killing of armed policeman Lucio Rodríguez in Madrid on 14 July 1975. Baena had been an activist in the then-illegal Communist Party of Spain and had been arrested and jailed following a student demonstration in 1970. His parents claimed that he had been in Portugal at the time of the killing and that one of the main witnesses was not allowed to attend the trial. Though the prosecution had sought the death penalty for all five accused, Pablo Mayoral Ronda and Fernando Siera Marco received sentences of 30 and 25 years, respectively. Lawyers of the three sentenced to death appealed the sentences.

The third military tribunal, held in Hoyo de Manzanares on 16 September 1975, sentenced FRAP members Manuel Cañaveras, María Jesús Dasca, Concepción Trisián, José Luis Sánchez-Bravo, and Ramón García Sanz, to death for their involvement in the killing of civil guard Antonio Pose in Madrid on 16 August 1975. The final tribunal took place in Barcelona on 19 September, and sentenced ETA member Juan Txiki Paredes Manot to death for the killing of armed policeman Ovidio Díaz in Barcelona on 6 June 1975.

On 26 September, the Council of Ministers, headed by Franco, confirmed the death penalty for five of those sentenced: FRAP members José Humberto Baena, Ramón García Sanz, and José Luis Sánchez Bravo; and ETA members Ángel Otaegui and Juan Paredes, while commuting the death penalty for the remaining six.

== Reactions ==
The sentences provoked international criticism and protests against the Spanish government. Large demonstrations took place in Italy, Stockholm, and Oslo, with the Swedish prime minister, Olof Palme, heading the Swedish demonstration. The Dutch foreign minister made a formal protest to the Spanish Ambassador. The Spanish Embassy in Lisbon was attacked and set on fire. The Spanish embassy in Switzerland was occupied for two hours by protesters. Mexican president, Luis Echeverría, called for Spanish membership of the United Nations Security Council to be suspended, but this was vetoed by the United States, who considered it an internal Spanish matter. Pope Paul VI asked the Spanish government to grant clemency to the condemned at his Sunday blessing in St. Peter's Square, though he also condemned the crimes committed. Franco's brother, Nicolás Franco, joined calls for clemency, appealing to Franco's Christianity.

A group of French intellectuals, including the actor Yves Montand, the film director Costa-Gavras, and the journalist Régis Debray, attempted to organise a press conference in Madrid to read a prepared statement condemning the sentences, but were detained by police and expelled from Spain.

== Executions ==
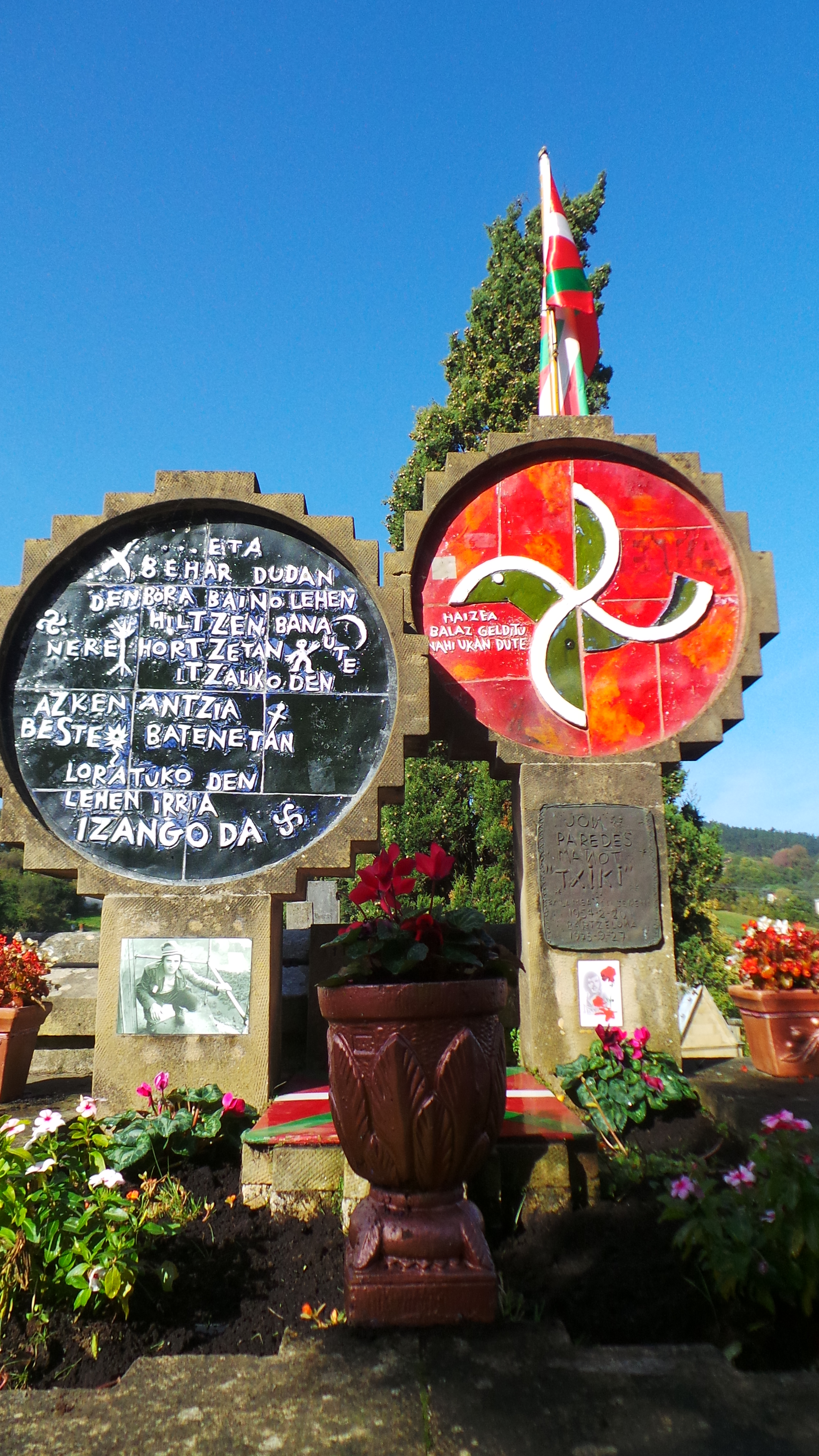
Grave of Paredes in Zarautz

The executions took place on 27 September 1975. Ángel Otaegui was the first executed, at 08:30 in Villalón prison, Burgos. Juan Paredes was executed at 08:35 in Barcelona. Paredes, according to his brother, was led to his execution smiling and singing an anthem of the Basque Army. The remaining three were executed in Hoyo de Manzanares, José Humberto Baena at 09:20, Ramón García Sanz at 09:40, and José Luis Sánchez Bravo at 10:00.

== Burials ==
The three FRAP members were buried the same morning in Hoyo de Manzanares. The executed men's families claimed they were denied access to their graves in the village graveyard and scuffles with police took place. However, Gustavo Catalán Deus, a photographer who witnessed the burials, said that some family members had been present, together with police, members of the military, and lawyers. The families had previously alleged that police had assaulted the mother of one of the condemned in Carabanchel Prison in Madrid during her final meeting with her son. The remains of Sánchez Bravo were later reinterred in Murcia, with those of Ramón García Sanz being reinterred in Madrid. Juan Paredes, who had been buried in Barcelona, was reinterred in Zarautz on 12 January 1977.

== Reactions to executions ==
=== Domestic reactions ===
In the Basque Country, 3,000 people took part in a protest march in Azpeitia, while a larger demonstration in San Sebastián saw 30,000 people in attendance. Six people were injured after being shot by police during a demonstration in Algorta. A mass in Madrid in memorial of the executed was followed by protests and arrests. 200,000 people took part in a two-day general strike in the Basque country, which began on 30 September 1975.

=== International reactions ===
Demonstrations occurred at Spain's embassy and consulates in France. The Spanish embassy in Brussels was fire-bombed. A day of national demonstration was organised by the Dutch government and a protest in Utrecht was led by Dutch prime minister Joop den Uyl. In Britain, the governing Labour Party passed a resolution condemning the executions. Poland and Hungary withdrew their commercial representatives in Spain, and 15 European countries (West Germany, East Germany, the United Kingdom, Belgium, the Netherlands, France, Switzerland, Portugal, Austria, Sweden, Ireland, Luxembourg, and Italy) withdrew their ambassadors to Spain in protest. In response, Spain withdrew its ambassadors from Norway, East Germany, The Vatican, West Germany, and the Netherlands for consultations, with its ambassador to Portugal unconditionally withdrawn in protest for the embassy attack. Spain's central bank also suspended trade in the Portuguese escudo.

Swedish prime minister Olof Palme denounced the Franco government as "devilish murderers." In the United Nations, the Swedish government attempted to pass a declaration condemning the Spanish government, but the United States government amended this to a general declaration condemning human rights violations, without specific reference to Spain.

=== Reaction within Spain ===
The Spanish press, controlled by the Franco government, was supportive of the executions. La Vanguardia condemned the "vile and intolerable" crimes of the executed and argued that, while any death was regrettable, a "strong state at the service of a truly free society" was necessary against "fanatics who seek to disturb the peace." ABC criticised foreign security forces for failing to defend Spanish property abroad against attacks from what they identified as "the extreme left" and stated that they hoped that the Spanish people's desire for "internal peace" would be respected by Western European governments.

On 1 October, a demonstration in support of the government took place in Madrid, with Spanish state television claiming that more than a million people had taken part. Franco addressed the crowds and denounced "the leftist-Masonic conspiracy assisting communist subversion" of Spain. This was the last demonstration that Franco attended before his death.

== Aftermath ==
In the immediate aftermath of the executions, there was speculation that up to 27 more prisoners could face the death penalty. Ultimately, these predictions proved ill-founded. Franco fell ill in late October 1975 and never recovered, dying on 20 November 1975. His death resulted in the de facto abolition of the death penalty, as no further executions took place. Capital punishment was abolished for all civil crimes by the Spanish Constitution of 1978, with sanctioned military executions in war time the sole exceptions. In 1995, the Spanish parliament abolished the death penalty in all circumstances.

The families of those executed continued to seek the overturning of the sentences and compensation, based on the irregularity of the processes used to convict their relatives. In 2004, they appealed to the Constitutional Court of Spain, which rejected their application on the grounds that it did not have the power to deal with cases prior to December 1978, when the Constitution came into effect. In September 2005, the European Court of Human Rights rejected their petition on similar grounds: that Spain had not been a signatory to the European Convention on Human Rights in 1975. In November 2012, a Basque Government commission found that the processes used to convict Txiki and Otaegui had violated their right to a fair trial and awarded €135,000 in compensation to their families. Flor Baena, the sister of José Humberto Baena, continued to campaign for her brother, stating that she wanted to clear his name, not financial compensation.

In November 2014, Spanish police refused an Argentinian request to Interpol, made under the terms of a 1987 treaty, to extradite 20 Francoists, among them those involved in the executions, for crimes against humanity.

The 1991 Spanish film The Longest Night depicts the fictional meeting between the military prosecutor of the trial and one of the defense attorneys fifteen years later.
