= Asociación Obrera Asambleista =

Spanish trade union movement

AOA
- Asociación Obrera Asambleista
- Founded: 1977
- Location: Spain

Asociación Obrera Asambleista (Assemblyist Workers Association, abbreviated AOA) was a trade union movement in Spain. AOA was linked to the Communist Party of Spain (Marxist–Leninist) and the Revolutionary Antifascist Patriotic Front. AOA had its roots in the Oposición Sindical Obrera (Workers' Trade Union Opposition). AOA appeared in late 1977. According to a 1977 government statement, AOA was further to the left than all other trade union groups at the time.

== Political positions ==
AOA advocated an "assemblyist" approach to trade unionism, in which all power over the movement would be in the hands of workers' assemblies and that the mandates of their delegates would be revokable at all times. In negotiations AOA would refuse to concede to compromises, citing that the workers' assemblies would be sovereign to decide over any deals with the employers.

AOA opposed the Moncloa Pacts and called for a "No" vote in the 1978 constitutional referendum. It condemned the Workers' Commissions and the Unión General de Trabajadores, which signed the Moncloa Social Pact, as "yellow unions". AOA demanded salary increases higher than the 10,000 peseta limit set by the Moncloa Social Pact as well as 40-hour work week, 30 days vacation per year and full compensated sick leave. AOA condemned the new Workers' Statue proposed by the Union of the Democratic Centre as "Francoist", and began a campaign against the economic policies of the government in late 1979. In campaigns like this, AOA generally stood alone. AOA found itself isolated in the trade union movement, as its maximalist line alienated the other organizations.

AOA struggled for the rights of blind people to employment and social security.

== Activities ==
AOA held its first congress in Madrid in January 1978. AOA itself claimed that some 2,500 delegates had taken part in the founding congress. Moreove, a pre-congress conference with 610 delegates was held in October 1977.

The second congress of AOA was held May 15–16, 1982.

AOA published the journal Asamblea Obrera.
