= Melitón Manzanas =

Spanish police officer (1909–1968)

- Born: Melitón Manzanas González; 9 June 1909; San Sebastián, Spain
- Died: 2 August 1968 (aged 59); San Sebastián, Spain
- Cause of death: Gunshot wounds
- Occupations: Police officer Torturer
- Known for: Collaboration with Nazi Germany Torturing dissidents of the Francoist regime Victim of ETA

Melitón Manzanas González (9 June 1909 – 2 August 1968) was a high-ranking police officer in Francoist Spain, known as a torturer and the first planned victim of ETA.

== Early life and background ==
Manzanas was born on 9 June 1909 in San Sebastián. He entered the Cuerpo de Investigación y Vigilancia (later Cuerpo General de Policía) police in 1938 or 1939, in Irun, where he established one of his infamous interrogation centres and collaborated with Nazi Germany — he helped the Gestapo to arrest Jews who were trying to escape from occupied France. He was assigned to San Sebastián in 1941, In the 1940s, the Spanish republican agent Juan García Herrero (a.k.a T-12) informed that Manzanas worked with Segunda Bis (Spanish military intelligence). He repressed smugglers, including members of the Comet Line Resistance network. The Basque Service of Information also informed the American Office of Strategic Services that Manzanas had helped the German occupiers of France, under the Belgian collaborator Georges-Henri Delfanne ("Masuy"). The detail about his activities is limited.

== Death and aftermath ==
On 2 August 1968, he was murdered in the first planned killing committed by ETA in response to the killing of Txabi Etxebarrieta. His killers waited for him at his residence and shot him seven times. The perpetrators were judged at the 1970 Burgos trials. The lawyer Gisèle Halimi published the book Le Procès de Burgos (1971), prefaced by Jean-Paul Sartre. The book, with input from ETA member José Antonio Etxebarrieta, asserted that Manzanas had helped the Gestapo hunting Spanish republicans in southern France.

Thirty years after his death, Manzanas was awarded the Medal of Civil Merit dedicated to the victims of terrorism by José María Aznar. Manzanas' service under Franco's regime, the fact that he was known for having used police torture, and the fact that he was not the first torturer rewarded by the Spanish Government raised some controversy about this award.

== See also ==
- List of unsolved murders (1900–1979)
