= Convent of the Salesas Reales =

Coordinates: 40°25′28.3″N 3°41′37.94″W

Convent of las Salesas Reales
- Convento de las Salesas Reales (Spanish)
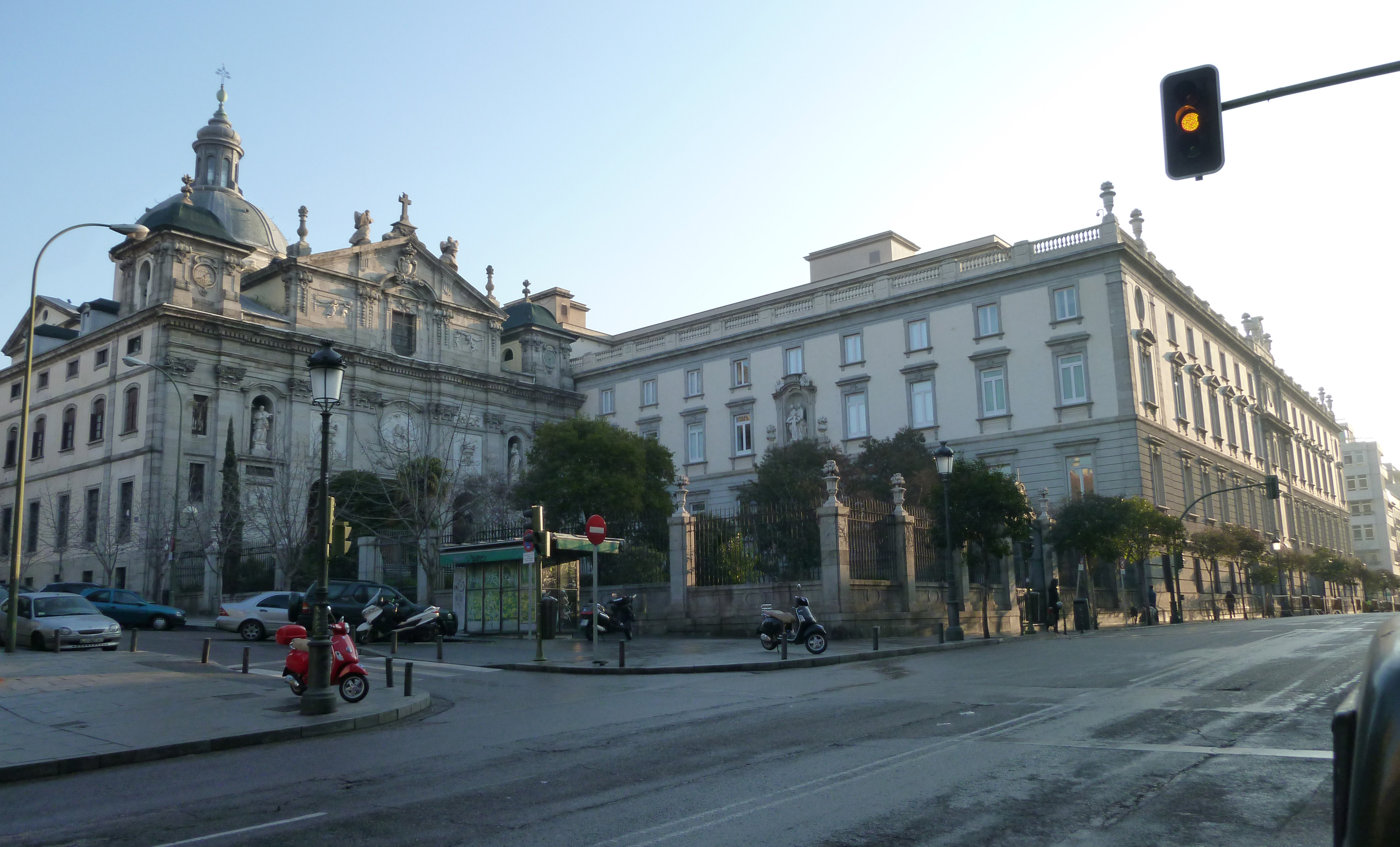

- Location within Spain
- Location: Madrid, Spain

Spanish Cultural Heritage
- Official name: Convento de las Salesas Reales
- Type: Non-movable
- Criteria: Monument
- Designated: 1979
- Reference no.: RI-51-0004359

The Convent of the Salesas Reales is an 18th-century architectural complex in central Madrid, Spain. Formerly a convent, specifically the convent of the Visitación de Nuestra Señora (Visitation of Our Lady), it was constructed and occupied by the Order of the Visitation of Holy Mary, which had been founded by St. Francis de Sales and St Jeanne de Chantal. The convent's church (dedicated to St Barbara) is now a parish church, and the remainder of the complex houses the Supreme Court of Spain. During 1963 until 1977, the facility was the headquarters of the Court of Public Order, a court created in Francoist Spain to deal with most political crimes. The Court of Public Order was established in December 1963 following Julián Grimau's execution by firing squad, replacing the Tribunal Especial para la Represión de la Masonería y el Comunismo.

== History ==
The convent was founded in 1748 by Queen Barbara of Portugal, wife of King Ferdinand VI, as a school and home for young noble women. She sought not just to establish a convent, but also a convenient place where she could retire. The convent was designed by François Carlier, and construction started in 1743. The original plans were modified and completed by 1750 by Francisco Moradillo. In 1870 the nuns were evicted and the building was converted into the Palace of Justice. During the twentieth century, the palace-convent suffered two fires, and required restoration by Joaquín Roji. The stairwell at the entrance was completed in 1930, opening to the new Barbara de Braganza street. The Tribunal de Orden Público had its headquarters in the Convent from 1963 till 1977.

The present building has a muted exterior compared to the original 18th century design, which while adhering to Neoclassic love of balanced and rigorous design, also was overflowing with decorative elements such as pilasters and lintels on every floor. In addition, unlike many convents, this building was full of windows. The convent commissioned by the Queen was derided in its time with the lines:

Bárbara Reina; bárbara obra; bárbaro gusto; bárbaro gasto.

which translates to:

Barbara Queen, barbarous work; barbarous taste; barbarous waste (expense).

== Church ==
The church contains the funeral monuments for Ferdinand VI and his wife Bárbara de Braganza (Barbara of Portugal). The church and the convent are separately listed as bienes de interés cultural.

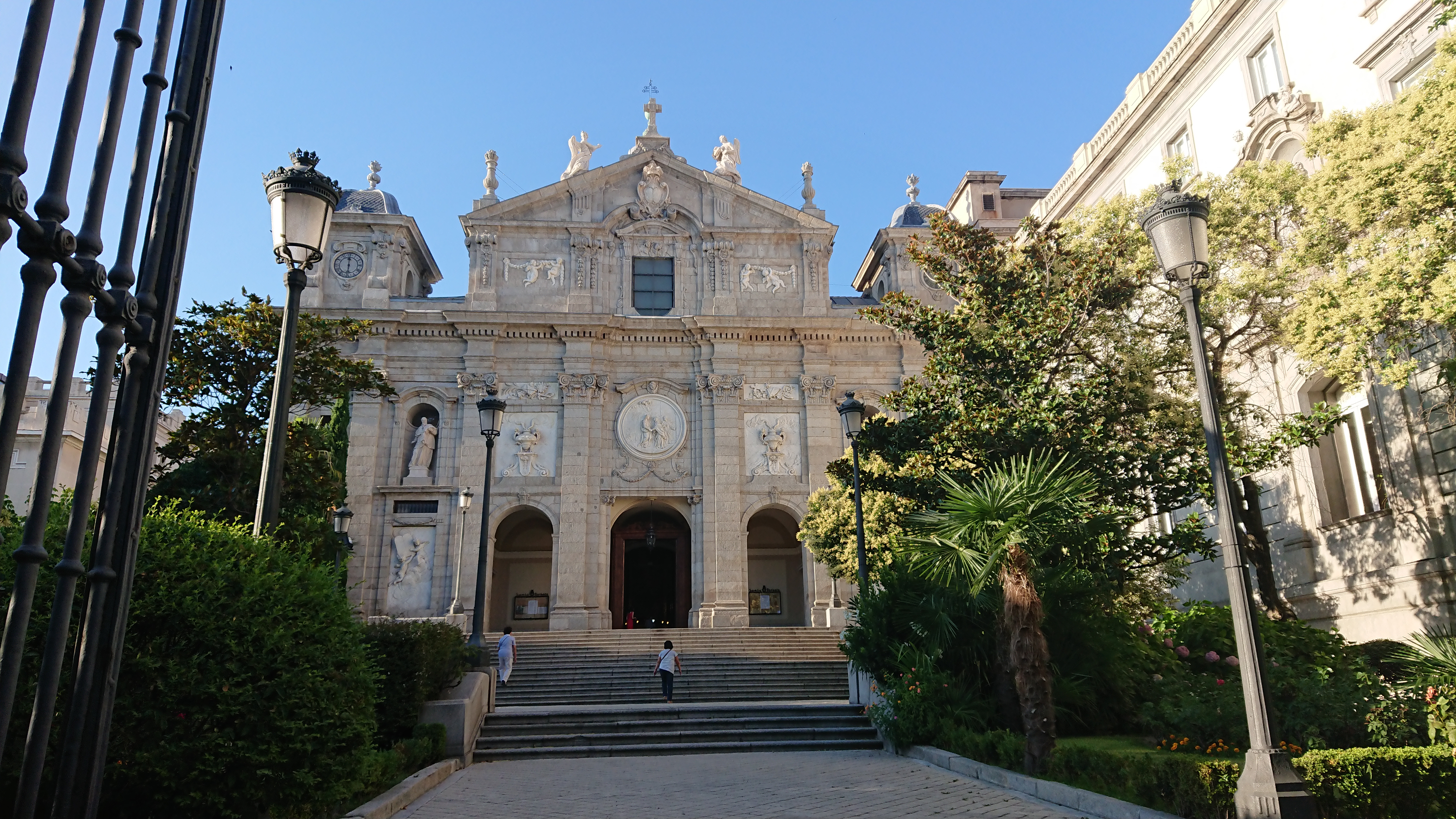
Church of Santa Bárbara main facade
