= Capital punishment in Spain =

Europe holds the greatest concentration of abolitionist states (blue). Map current as of 2022 Abolished for all offences Abolished in practice Retains capital punishment

The 1978 Spanish Constitution bans capital punishment in Spain, except for wartime offences. Spain completely abolished capital punishment for all offenses, including in times of war, in October 1995. The ban was pushed for by María Asunción Milá.

The last executions were carried out on 27 September 1975 when five members of ETA and Revolutionary Antifascist Patriotic Front (FRAP) were executed by firing squad for murder following a much-publicised trial in which a number of the convicted (including a pregnant woman) were given clemency by General Francisco Franco, and the sentences of the remaining five, due to the unavailability of executioners versed in the use of the garrote, were carried out by shooting. Strangulation by garotte had been portrayed as a draconian act by the public after its last use in 1974, when Salvador Puig Antich was executed in Barcelona and Heinz Chez in Tarragona.

== History ==
Capital punishment was common in the Spanish kingdom, and methods used included decapitation (especially for nobility). In 1820, Ferdinand VII replaced all other methods with the garrote, which was used mainly since then, including for the liberal freedom fighter Mariana de Pineda Muñoz and the assassin of six-time Prime Minister of Spain Antonio Cánovas del Castillo. According to a pamphlet published anonymously by Crown Prince Oscar Bernadotte, Spain was the most frequent executioner of the Western world in the early 1800s, followed by his native Sweden. The penalty was abolished by the Second Spanish Republic in 1932 but restored two years later in the midst of social and political turmoil for a few major offences, not including murder.

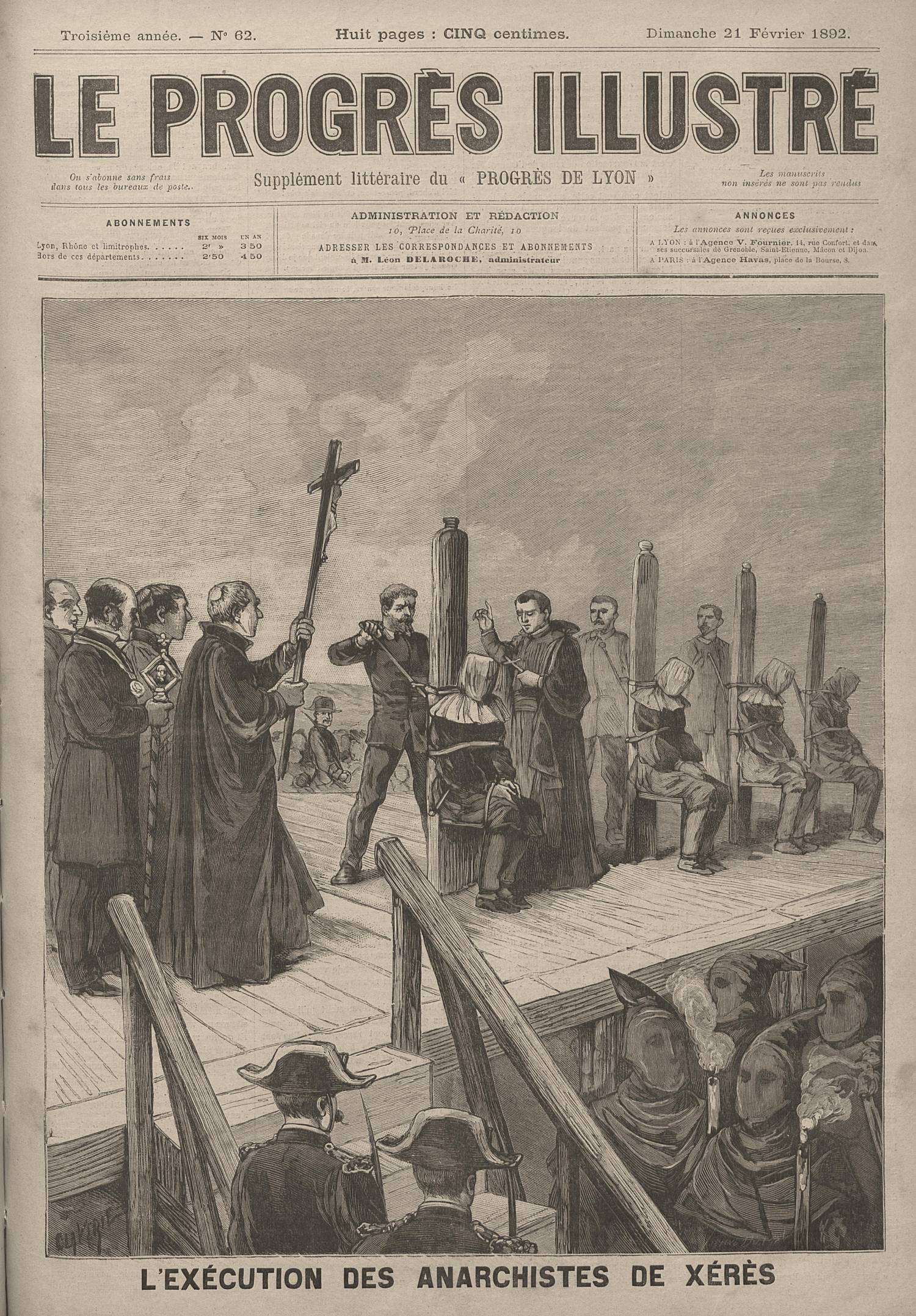
Issue of Le Progres depicting the executions of anarchists in Xeres in 1892 by use of the garrote.

=== Francoist Spain ===
Capital punishment in Francoist Spain was restored fully on decree in 1938. From 1940 to 1975, 165 judicial executions are reported to have been carried out, although precise numbers from the years following the Spanish Civil War are vague. By one estimate, at least 1,706 executions by firing squad were reported only in Barcelona until 1952. Among the most relevant executed from this period there is Lluís Companys, President of the Generalitat of Catalonia.

As Franco's regime was consolidated, use of capital punishment became scarcer; between 1950 and 1959, 58 Spaniards (including 2 women) were executed by garrotte and 9 by firing squad. In the last execution of a woman, in 1959 in Valencia, the executioner Antonio López Guerra was not ready to kill a young woman, the 31-year-old poisoner Pilar Prades. He had to be softened with brandy and dragged to the garrote stick. The unusual circumstances inspired the final scene of the 1963 film The Executioner In the 1960s, the total number of executions dropped to 6; 2 in 1960, 2 in 1963 and 2 in 1966 (less than in neighbouring France, although several of the convictions were considered political). Due to criticism, a 6-year moratorium followed, broken when Pedro Martínez Exposito was shot in 1972 for homicide and robbery. The next executions, of Salvador Puig Antich and Heinz Chez in 1974, were allegedly held on the same day to deliberately confuse public sentiments and equalise the execution of a political opponent - both were convicted of killing Guardia Civil members - with that of a common murderer. The last five death sentences were carried out simultaneously in Madrid, Barcelona and Burgos on 27 September 1975, prompting Swedish Prime Minister Olof Palme - amongst other harsh condemnations - to denounce the regime as "devilish murderers" the following day.

The imposition of the death penalty for terrorism followed its own logic during Franco's dictatorship. Sometimes it was not swiftly carried out, such as in the case of Andrés Ruiz Márquez (Coronel Montenegro), a member of a Spanish National Liberation Front (FELN) commando who had set up a string of small bombs in Madrid. He was arrested by the Spanish police in 1964 and condemned to death but saw his sentence commuted to life in prison.

== See also ==
- Tribunal de Orden Público
