= Revolutionary Antifascist Patriotic Front =

Revolutionary Antifascist Patriotic Front Frente Revolucionario Antifascista y Patriota
- President: Julio Álvarez del Vayo
- Coordinating committee: Raúl Marco, Elena Odena, Eladio Zújar, Julio Álvarez del Vayo and Alberto Fernández
- Founder: PCE (m–l), FELN and Vanguardia Socialista
- Founded: 1971
- Dissolved: Last active in 1978; Not formally dissolved
- Headquarters: France, Switzerland
- Newspaper: ¡Acción!
- Ideology: Spanish republicanism Left-wing nationalism Anti-Francoism; Marxism-Leninism
- Political position: Far-left
- Colors: Red, Yellow and Murrey (Spanish Republican colors)

Party flag

The Revolutionary Antifascist Patriotic Front (Spanish: Frente Revolucionario Antifascista y Patriota, sometimes also Frente Revolucionario Antifascista y Patriótico; Catalan: Front Revolucionari Antifeixista i Patriota; FRAP) was a radical Spanish anti-Francoist, Marxist–Leninist revolutionary organization that operated in the 1970s.

== History ==
=== Initial phase ===
In January 1971, shortly after Julio Álvarez del Vayo dissolved the largely inactive Spanish National Liberation Front (FELN), a coordinating committee for the creation of a revolutionary, antifascist and patriotic front (FRAP) began operating both in the universities of the largest cities in Spain (Valencia, Barcelona and Madrid) and among manufacturing workers of the main industrial regions as a still modest opposition movement against Francoist Spain. The committee was set up at a meeting of the leaders of the organization that was held in Paris. That Coordinating Committee (Comité Coordinador) was formed by Raúl Marco (Julio Fernández), Elena Odena (Benita Benigna Ganuza Muñoz) and Eladio Zújar (Lorenzo Peña) from the Communist Party of Spain (Marxist–Leninist), as well as Alberto Fernández and Julio Álvarez del Vayo from the Spanish National Liberation Front (FELN). Two-and-a-half years later, the FRAP was finally created. Lorenzo Peña had meanwhile left the organization altogether.

After the establishment of the FRAP proper, it initiated a more serious career of coordinating efforts with the aim of creating unrest in the universities and factories and motivating Spanish students and manual workers to begin an insurgency. Álvarez del Vayo, who had been the leader of the FELN, strongly believed in armed struggle.

FRAP published ¡Acción!, and in 1972, a secret FRAP printing press was found in Madrid by the Brigada Político-Social (BPS), the Francoist political police division.

==== Objectives ====
The goals of FRAP were expressed in six points that were widely publicized:

- Overthrowing Franco's fascist dictatorship.
- Establishing a popular federal republic in Spain.
- Expelling the "Yankee imperialists" from Spanish territory through an insurrection.
- Nationalization of foreign-owned companies in Spain.
- Confiscating the wealth of the oligarchy and executing land reform.
- Disbanding the fascist armed forces and founding a popular army at the service of the people.

=== Activity among university students and workers ===
The peak of FRAP's success was around 1973–74 when FRAP's activity was concentrated in the universities, encouraging the students to be aggressive and organized by forming self-defense pickets (piquetes de autodefensa). The first demonstrations on 1 May 1973 helped FRAP to develop strategies in fighting the police. After its success, the following year on 1 May 1974, when FRAP called for a demonstration in the largest universities against the Francoist State the response of the Spanish students was forthcoming. They came out to the campuses and the streets in great numbers and the demonstrations ended in a big battle. The balance was: one dead policeman, about 20 people wounded and about 300 FRAP sympathizers arrested.

During the following months, the Armed Spanish Police continued identifying and arresting hundreds of FRAP militants and supporters. Only years later it would be known that many agents provocateurs of the Armed Police had infiltrated FRAP ranks.

=== Armed phase and twilight of the movement ===
At the beginning of 1975, Francoist Spain unleashed a thorough wave of repression. The result was that 11 members of FRAP were arrested by the Spanish police and brought to a military court. FRAP's reaction in March was to initiate its 'armed phase' (fase armada) with the establishment of a 'military branch' (rama militar), a proposal that had been put forward by Álvarez del Vayo months before he died in exile in Geneva. As a result, in July and in August, two policemen were killed by FRAP members in two separate incidents. On 26 August, the Francoist State promulgated an "Antiterrorist Law" with a retrospective action. 5 members of FRAP were brought to a military court and 3 of them, José Luis Sánchez-Bravo Sollas, José Humberto Baena Alonso and Ramón García Sanz were sentenced to death and were executed. International observers at the trial, such as Swiss lawyer Christian Grobet, contested the validity of the proceedings. They, along with two members of the ETA political-military, were executed on 27 September 1975 and were the last people to be executed in Spain.

On the first October 1975 FRAP killed four more policemen. The group not only engaged in encouraging demonstrations and political assassinations, it also carried out a number of successful armed robberies. After caudillo Franco's death in November 1975, the FRAP movement continued its struggle against the newly instituted monarchy, perceiving it as a continuation of Francoism under a new guise. But FRAP and the Communist Party of Spain (Marxist–Leninist) connected with it had lost much of their initial steam and First of October Anti-Fascist Resistance Groups, another radical violent group, attached to the Communist Party of Spain (Reconstituted), took over. The last FRAP armed groups were arrested in 1978 and though not formally dissolved, the organization's activity came to an end. In 1982 during the first Spanish Socialist Workers' Party government under Felipe González an amnesty was granted to FRAP militants by Royal Order.

There was an attempt to revive the FRAP in the 2000s.

== Assassinations ==
The FRAP has been labelled a terrorist organization by the modern-day Spanish government and multiple Spanish right-wing media outlets. The members of the Francoist Police assassinated by the FRAP have been granted the status of victims of terrorism by the Spanish government.

Date	Victim	Corps
1 May 1973	Juan Antonio Fernández Gutiérrez	Cuerpo de Policía Armada y de Tráfico (Madrid)
27 September 1973	Francisco Jesús Anguas Barragán	Cuerpo de Policía Armada y de Tráfico (Barcelona)
14 July 1975	Lucio Rodríguez Martín	Cuerpo de Policía Armada y de Tráfico (Madrid)
16 August 1975	Antonio Pose Rodríguez	Guardia Civil (Madrid)
14 September 1975	Juan Ruiz Muñoz	Cuerpo de Policía Armada y de Tráfico (Barcelona)
29 September 1975	Diego del Río Martín	Cuerpo de Policía Armada y de Tráfico (Barcelona)

== See also ==
- Post–World War II anti-fascism
- Capital punishment in Spain
- Hotel Corona de Aragón fire
- Policía Armada
- Tribunal de Orden Público
- Opposition to Francoism
