= Hotel Corona de Aragón fire =

1979 fire in Zaragoza, Aragon, Spain

Corona de Aragón Fire
- Date: 12 July 1979
- Venue: Corona de Aragón Hotel
- Location: Zaragoza, Aragon, Spain; 41.6516°N 0.8859°W
- Type: Fire
- Cause: Accidental fire
- Deaths: 80+

The Corona de Aragón Fire was an accidental fire that killed at least 80 people in the five-star Corona de Aragón Hotel in Zaragoza, Aragon, Spain on 12 July 1979. At the time of the event, the hotel lodged high-profile members of General Franco's family Carmen Polo, Carmen Franco y Polo and Cristóbal Martínez Bordiú, as well as many high-ranking military personnel, five of whom died in the fire.

== Fire ==
At the night of the fire there were 300 registered guests, the majority of whom were Spanish citizens. Nearly 200 guests were evacuated from the 10-story hotel, however many attempted to climb down ropes of bed sheets or tossed children out of windows into firemen's nets. Two United States Air Force helicopters from the Joint American-Spanish air base outside Zaragoza were used in the evacuation of guests, and some guests lay in the swimming pool on the roof until they were evacuated. It was reported that those who could not jump to safety, reach the ladders, or escape from their rooms, died due to suffocation.

== Aftermath and conspiracy theories ==
Details of the fire investigation were not openly disclosed and the authorities insisted that it was an accidental fire. The Order of 25 September 1979 on fire prevention in tourist establishments was passed in response to the fire.

Not long after the fire took place, conspiracy theorists voiced the opinion that ETA was the real culprit, but that its role was being silenced; other sources described the event as an intentional attack. The Terrorism Victims' Association (AVT), asked for official recognition of the fire as a terrorist attack.

The official version of events provided at the time by the Spanish government insisted that the fire had been started accidentally by an oil fire in the hotel café. The Spanish Council of State explicitly stated that they did not consider the fire to be an act of terrorism. However, some details of the fire investigation leaked to the press, disclosing that Napalm traces might have been found in the rubble. Moreover, some witnesses claimed to hear two explosions before the fire and a local newspaper (Heraldo de Aragón) received two phone calls claiming authorship in the name of ETA (m) and the FRAP. The claim attributed to FRAP was unlikely, for the group was practically inactive after some of its core members had been arrested in 1978.

In 2000, relatives of those killed started to receive benefits as terrorism victims. According to El Mundo that was an implicit recognition of ETA authorship. The Civil Guard website listed a high rank retired Civil Guard member deceased in the fire as a victim of ETA, and stated that many injured died after the fire, but were not included in the official account of 80 dead.
