= Spanish National Liberation Front =

Spanish National Liberation Front Frente Español de Liberación Nacional (FELN)
- Founder: Julio Álvarez del Vayo
- Founded: 1964
- Dissolved: 1970
- Merged into: Together with PCE (m-l) and Vanguardia Socialista gave origin to the Revolutionary and Patriotic Antifascist Front (FRAP)
- Headquarters: Belgium and France
- Newspaper: FELN and ¡Frente!
- Ideology: Spanish republicanism Left-wing nationalism Anti-Francoism; Revolutionary socialism Third worldism
- Colors: Red, Yellow and Murrey (Spanish Republican colors)

Party flag

Spanish National Liberation Front (Spanish: Frente Español de Liberación Nacional), better known by its acronym FELN, was a Spanish Republican anti-Francoist opposition group based in Belgium and France active between 1963 and 1970. Its founder was Julio Álvarez del Vayo.

== History ==
The FELN was founded in February 1964 after the Communist Party of Spain (PCE) abandoned the armed struggle under the leadership of Santiago Carrillo, which resulted in the waning of the activity of the Spanish Maquis. The new group was led by Julio Álvarez del Vayo and other communists who were disappointed by the PCE's shift in policy and who wanted to keep the armed struggle going against Francoist rule. Its main points were two:

- To keep the fight going on within Spain.
- To carry out every necessary action in order to overthrow the Francoist Regime.

FELN's line, beside being pro-Republican and anti-Francoist, was very Anti-American, being one of the first groups demanding the closure of US military bases in Spain. Álvarez del Vayo's ambition of having a Republican movement continuing the armed struggle of the Maquis within Spain was thwarted, however, by the effectiveness and ruthlessness of the Spanish police network, which included the Armed Police (Policía Armada), the Civil Guard (Guardia Civil) and the Political Police Division (Brigada Político-Social). Therefore, the Spanish National Liberation Front remained small and its activity largely marginal throughout its history. Álvarez del Vayo was often gently mocked or dismissed in certain exiled Spanish Republican and Communist circles for harboring an optimism that was not founded on the realities on the ground.

In an interview given to Le Monde, Álvarez del Vayo claimed that the FELN had a wide base that included Socialist dissidents and that it was open to 'antifascist' Spaniards from a wide political spectrum determined to fight against General Franco's dictatorship. He also claimed that he was not the president of the FELN. But some of Álvarez del Vayo's boastful declarations, such as his claim that the FELN was the "armed wing of the Spanish Third Republic Movement" (III República) —a then largely defunct Spanish republican organization formerly based in Algiers—, were disputed by other Spanish exiles.

FELN published first FELN (FELN : órgano del Frente Español de Liberación Nacional), followed by ¡Frente!; both publications were crudely printed.

The success of the student demonstrations of May 1968 in France inspired a new vision in the FELN that brought about the creation of a new radical group together with the Communist Party of Spain (Marxist–Leninist) and Vanguardia Socialista, an obscure group led by Alberto Fernández. This vision led to the foundation of the Revolutionary and Patriotic Antifascist Front (FRAP). A more high-profile group, FRAP would continue the anti-Francoist struggle into the 1970s and Álvarez del Vayo would become the leader of the Permanent Committee of the new radical organization.

=== The Caso Montenegro ===
Owing to its scant activity, the Spanish National Liberation Front remained relatively obscure throughout its existence. But in 1964 the Caso Montenegro, in which the FELN was involved, hit the headlines of the Spanish press. Even so, in press statements and newspaper articles within Spain, the name of the organization was withheld from the public.

The most high-profile Spanish National Liberation Front activist was Andrés Ruiz Márquez, nicknamed Coronel Montenegro, member of an FELN commando and a former lieutenant of the Francoist Army who excelled in skiing. Starting 10 May 1964 he set up small bombs (actually large firecrackers) in different places across Madrid city center. Some of the explosions occurred near buildings that harbored institutions of the Francoist State, as well as the American Embassy and the Hilton Hotel. Finally Ruiz Márquez was arrested on 23 June by the Spanish police in the downtown Calle de Serrano while he was carrying three of his firecrackers.

On 7 July Ruiz Márquez was condemned to death by a consejo de guerra, in what became known as the "Caso Montenegro". The trial would draw public attention in its day because the list of crimes imputed to Coronel Montenegro had been blown out of proportion, including being charged with the planting of a series of explosive devices that had gone off in Madrid in September 1963. Later Ruiz Márquez saw his sentence commuted to life in prison, in a gesture designed to make the dictator look magnanimous according to exiled Spanish republicans. Ruiz Márquez would remain in jail until 1977, two years after Franco's death, becoming the first Spaniard accused of terrorism having served such a long term in prison.

== See also ==
- Revolutionary Antifascist Patriotic Front
- Organisation of Marxist–Leninists of Spain
- Tribunal de Orden Público
- Capital punishment in Spain
