= Superior Police Corps =

Spanish national police force

Superior Police Corps Cuerpo Superior de Policía
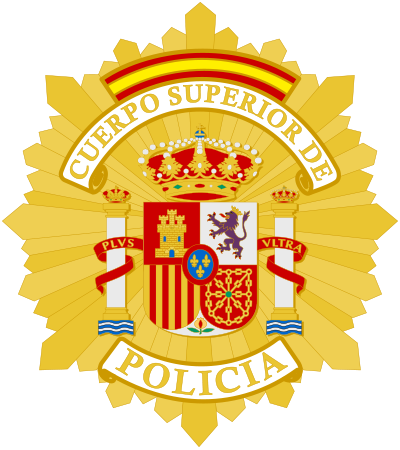
- The emblem of the CSP
- Abbreviation: CSP

Agency overview
- Formed: 4 December 1978
- Preceding agency: Cuerpo General de Policía
- Dissolved: 13 March 1986
- Superseding agency: Cuerpo Nacional de Policía

Jurisdictional structure
- National agency: Spain
- Operations jurisdiction: Spain
- Governing body: Ministry of the Interior
- General nature: Civilian police

Operational structure
- Overseen by: Directorate-General for Security
- Headquarters: Madrid

The Superior Police Corps (Spanish: Cuerpo Superior de Policía, CSP) was a law enforcement force of Spain created during the Spanish transition to democracy and predecessor of the present-day National Police Corps. It was also known colloquially as "the Secret Police" or simply "the Secret". They came to be called contemptuously (especially within the police circles) "the badges", by the way they identified themselves by showing their badge.

== History ==
The origins of CSP are in the General Police Corps (CGP) of the Francoist Spain, which on 4 December 1978 was renamed as "Superior Police Corps". The CSP inherited much of the staff from the old CGP, and also maintained its structure with slight modifications. Organically it depended on the Ministry of the Interior, although directly it did it through the Directorate-General of Security (DGS).

In the middle of 1980s the CSP was affected by the existence of a mafia network (known as the "police mafia") composed of several policemen who acted outside the law and in collusion with criminals to the organization of robberies to jewelry stores; Later, the corrupt policemen took over the stolen property and sold it illegally. This corrupt network was discovered following the statements to the justice of a jeweler, Federico Venero, which would lead to the dismantling of the network and the prosecution of those involved. This plot was also related to the disappearance of Santiago Corella (alias "Nani"), a common criminal who disappeared without a trace after being arrested by the policemen involved in the organization of robberies. His disappearance ended up becoming a media scandal.

The CSP also suffered from significant organizational deficiencies, disorganization and the need for internal modernization, which impeded optimal performance in its functions. This forced the first government of Felipe González to undertook an internal reorganization of the police to improve its functioning.

The Superior Police Corps was dissolved on 13 March 1986 with the enactment of Organic Law of Security Forces and Corps, which created the National Police Corps (CNP), on the basis of the former police forces in existence then in Spain, the SPC and the NPC, which were fused into one.

== Rank insignia ==
Although the CSP was a civilian institution, its members could wear uniforms with the rank of their category for official events.

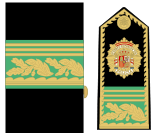
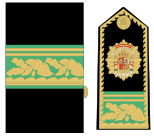
Categories	Command Ranks
Spain
Spain	Principal Commissioner	Commissioner

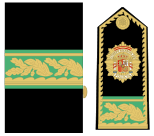
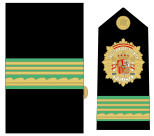
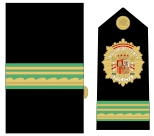
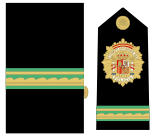
Categories	Executive Ranks
Spain
Spain	Subcommissioner	1st rank Inspector	2nd rank Inspector	3rd rank Inspector

== See also ==
- Armed Police Corps
- General Police Corps
- National Police Corps
