= Political-Social Brigade =

Secret police in Francoist Spain

- Brigada Político-Social

Agency overview
- Formed: 1941
- Preceding agency: División de Investigación Social
- Dissolved: 1978
- Superseding agency: Brigada Central de Información
- Type: Police
- Jurisdiction: Francoist Spain
- Headquarters: Madrid
- Parent agency: Cuerpo General de Policía

The Political-Social Brigade (Spanish: Brigada Político-Social, BPS), officially the Social Investigation Brigade (Spanish: Brigada de Investigación Social, BSI), was a secret police in Francoist Spain in charge of persecuting and repressing opposition movements. The brigade was a section of the General Police Corps (CGP). During the Spanish transition to democracy, it was restructured and replaced by the Central Information Brigade (BCI). Among the anti-Franco opposition, it was known colloquially as "the Social", "the Secret" or "the Brigade".

== History ==
=== Origins ===
The Political-Social Brigade originated at the beginning of the 20th century, with the creation of the Information Brigade and the Brigade of Anarchism and Socialism as units to combat anarchism and the growing labor movement. At the end of the dictatorship of Miguel Primo de Rivera, the Social Investigation Division was created by General Emilio Mola and headed by Commissioner Santiago Martín Báguenas.

The brigade's immediate roots were in the Nationalist faction during the Spanish Civil War. A 24 June 1938 decree created a bureau for "the control of matters in political action" and the "prevention and repression" of any activities which "obstruct or deviate" the "general guidelines of the government". Many of its first members came from the Information and Military Police Service (SIPM), the Francoist secret service during the war which was led by General José Ungría Jiménez. In 1940, during his visit to Spain, Nazi leader Reichsführer-SS Heinrich Himmler ensured that Paul Winzer, an officer in the Schutzstaffel (SS) and the Gestapo who was stationed in Spain, would train the new Spanish secret police. Winzer instructed new agents of the Political-Social Brigade until 1944.

It was created in 1941 with the Law on the Operation of the Superior Police Headquarters and the Law on Surveillance and Security. In addition to its own investigative work, the brigade could count on reports from the Falange's Information and Investigation Service, which also functioned as a political police.

A 1949 British report described the brigade:

The activities of the Brigade are based on the Nazi model, ensuring systematic surveillance of all suspected enemies of the state. All political cases fall within the Brigade, which acts by order of the Chief of Police. The interrogation of a prisoner may include the use of cruel methods, tending to force statements later called "confessions". As they receive an extra money, the poorly paid police officers tend to use increasingly violent methods and to prolong as much as possible the isolation of the prisoners to obtain a confession.

Blas Pérez González, Minister of Governance from 1942 to 1957, was the main organizer of the brigade and the Francoist police.

=== Repression ===
Commissioner Roberto Conesa, appointed to head the brigade during the last years of Francoism and the transition to democracy, was notorious among the clandestine left-wing sector for his brutal methods of interrogation and torture. A prominent police officer, Melitón Manzanas (head of the brigade in Guipúzcoa), was also known for brutal torture during interrogation. Manzanas was assassinated in 1968 by ETA. Another police officer who stood out for violent methods during interrogations at Directorate-General of Security (DGS) headquarters was Antonio González Pacheco (known as "Billy the Kid"). González Pacheco became Conesa's lieutenant in the brigade.

Antoni Batista and the Democratic Justice group of judges, prosecutors and lawyers deepened the Political-Social Brigade's repression. Democratic Justice reported that police torture was practiced with impunity and civil rights were suspended during multiple states of emergency from the 1960s to Francisco Franco's death in 1975, primarily in three regions: the Basque Country, Catalonia and Madrid. According to the reports, the brigades presented their reports and petitions for a judge's signature with undue haste. The possibility that a judge would refuse was remote; although they could investigate complaints by detainees and victims of torture, the judges were also subject to the brigades.

No judge would dare to excuse torture in a resolution, but some systematically close their eyes to all signs of torture and subscribe to the argument of the need for torture as a method of investigation so as not to leave the state unarmed.

Torture, ill-treatment and humiliation of detainees (including "beatings with a baton and wet towels, cigarette burns and cuts with razor blades") were still frequently carried out in BPS offices as late as 1975, near the end of the Francoist Spain.

=== Dissolution ===
The powers of the BPS were restricted by decrees which were approved in 1976, 1977 and 1981. The last decree was issued after the 1981 Spanish coup d'état attempt.

Although the brigade was restructured and replaced by the Central Information Brigade (BCI) in 1978, but its dissolution was not completely formalized until Organic Law 2/1986, of March 13, of Security Forces and Corps was approved during the first government of Felipe González. The transition did not include debriefing former members of the brigade; after it was disbanded, many its members continued their careers with the Spanish police (including commissioner Roberto Conesa, head of the newly created BCI). Brigade members known for their brutality, however, tended to be assigned to background positions or were encouraged to leave the force.

According to some sources, the Ministry of the Interior archives contain about 100,000 political files from the Franco era (including Political-Social Brigade files). Other archives, such as those identifying members of the secret police responsible for the surveillance and monitoring of opposition members, were presumably destroyed.

== Structure and function ==
The brigade was integrated within the General Commissariat of Public Order, dependent on the General Police Corps (CGP). This, in turn, depended on the Directorate-General of Security (DGS) and the Ministry of Governance. During its early years of history, it also had Falangist elements. When the Civil Guard operated in cities, it was integrated into the brigade. Spanish Maquis guerrilla activity, such as the 1944 urban guerrilla warfare in Granada. occasionally triggered intervention by special BPS units. (Note: This intervention took place after the death in strange circumstances of the inspector Julio Romero Funes, during a shooting with republican guerrillas (Aróstegui & Marco, 2008, p. 162).)

Its agents depended on the governors and the Ministry of Governance, and its repression was directed at opposition to the Spanish state and based on the Law of Political Responsibilities and similar statutes. Their actions consisted of surveillance (including wiretapping), unregulated control of private and business correspondence, indefinite government detention, confiscation of property, and torture as an instrument of interrogation and punishment. The Fuero of the Spaniards (which theoretically guaranteed fundamental rights) remained in effect without enforcement. The Spanish government was also allowed to suspend the Fuero for long periods of time in specific regions. Police housing records were a common (and feared) BPS practice. Many of the brigade's activities were examined by two courts created specifically for political repression: the Tribunal Especial para la Represión de la Masonería y el Comunismo and the Tribunal de Orden Público (TOP). Other courts and judges knew little about the brigade's activities.

== See also ==
- Geheime Staatspolizei (Gestapo) of Nazi Germany
- Organizzazione per la Vigilanza e la Repressione dell'Antifascismo (OVRA) of Fascist Italy and the RSI
- Kempeitai of the Empire of Japan
- Polícia Internacional e de Defesa do Estado (PIDE) of Estado Novo (Portugal)
- Centro Superior de Información de la Defensa (CESID) of democratic Spain
