= Santa Bárbara, Madrid =

Roman Catholic church in central Madrid, Spain

Church of St Barbara
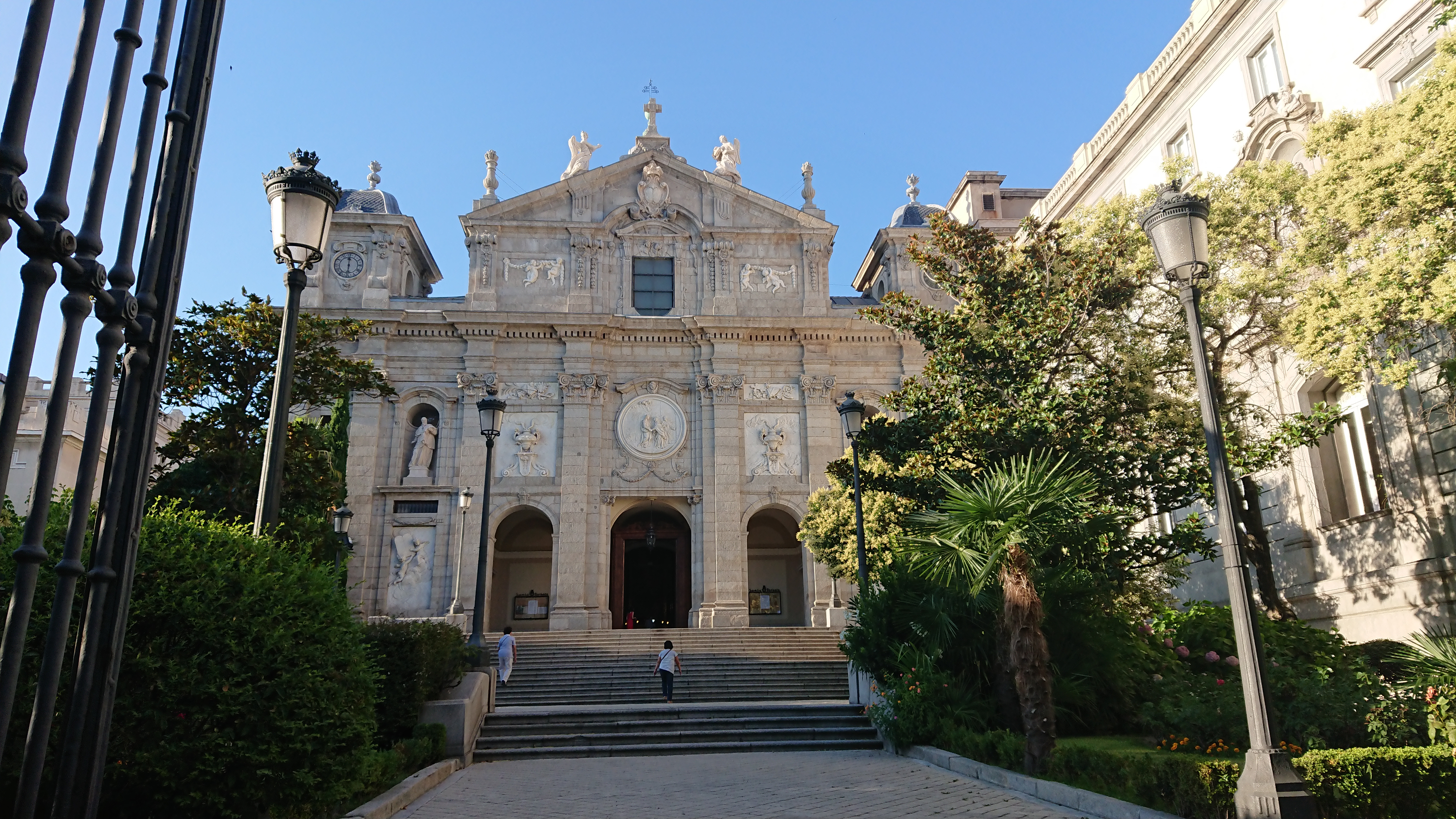
- Main facade of the church

Religion
- Affiliation: Roman Catholic
- Diocese: Centro
- Region: Community of Madrid
- Ecclesiastical or organisational status: Parish church
- Status: Church: active.

Location
- Municipality: Madrid
- State: Spain
- Interactive map of Church of St Barbara
- Coordinates: 40°25′28.3″N 3°41′37.94″W

Architecture
- Architect: François Carlier
- Groundbreaking: 1750
- Completed: 1758

The Santa Barbara, also known as Church of the Monastery of the Salesas Reales, is a Catholic church, built in Neoclassic style, in central Madrid, Spain. It is one of a number of Spanish churches dedicated to St Barbara.

== History ==
This church was built in 1757 for the Convent of the Salesas Reales, housing nuns belonging to the order of St. Francis de Sales. (The order is also known as the Order of the Visitation of Holy Mary). The convent was founded in 1748 by the Queen Bárbara de Braganza, wife of Ferdinand VI of Spain. The church, which stood next to the convent, was designed by Francisco Carlier in collaboration with Francisco Moradillo. In 1870, the monastery was closed, and the government used the monastery as the Palace of Justice, now as the Supreme Court. In 1891, the church was open to parish worship.

== Overview ==
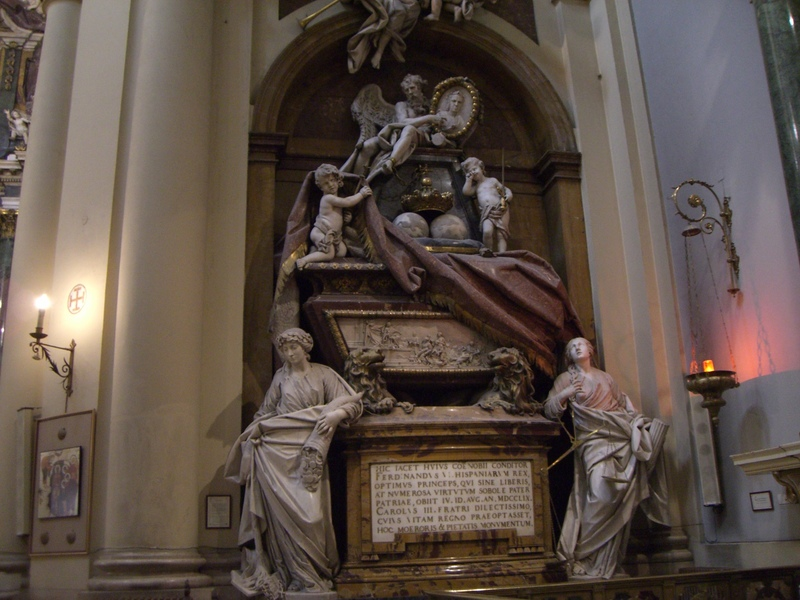
Tomb of Ferdinand VI of Spain

The exterior is noted for the statues of St. Francis de Sales and St Jeanne de Chantal, founders of the Order, sculpted by Alfonso Giraldo Vergaz. In the interior, are the burial tombs of Ferdinand VI and his wife. These were commissioned by Charles III of Spain and completed by the architect Francisco Sabatini and the sculptor Francisco Gutiérrez. In addition, it holds the tomb of the general Leopoldo O´Donnell, first duke of Tetuán, work of Jeronimo Suñol.

== See also ==
- Catholic Church in Spain
- List of oldest church buildings
