= Communist Youth of Spain (Marxist–Leninist) =

Communist Youth of Spain (Marxist–Leninist) Juventud Comunista de España (marxista-leninista)
- Founded: 1970
- Headquarters: Madrid
- Ideology: Communism; Marxism–Leninism; Antifascism
- Mother party: Communist Party of Spain (Marxist-Leninist)
- International affiliation: Student union affiliation
- Newspaper: Joven Guardia

Communist Youth of Spain (Marxist–Leninist) (Spanish: Juventud Comunista de España (marxista-leninista), JCE (ml)) was a communist youth organization in Spain, connected to the Communist Party of Spain (Marxist-Leninist).

JCE (ml) emerged in the 1970s as a clandestine organization. It published Joven Guardia. In 1974 JCE (ml) was one of the organizations contributing to the founding of FRAP (Revolutionary Antifascist Patriotic Front).
