= Communist Party of Spain (Reconstituted) =

Communist Party of Spain (Reconstituted) Partido Comunista de España (Reconstituido)
- Founder: Manuel Pérez Martínez 'Arenas'
- Founded: 1975
- Banned: 2000s
- Preceded by: Organisation of Marxist–Leninists of Spain
- Headquarters: France and Spain
- Newspaper: Antorcha
- Armed wing: First of October Anti-Fascist Resistance Groups
- Ideology: Marxism-Leninism; Republicanism; Maoism (historic)
- Colors: Red, Yellow and Murrey (Spanish Republican colors)

Party flag

The Partido Comunista de España (Reconstituido) (English: "Communist Party of Spain (Reconstituted)", PCE(r)) is a Spanish clandestine Marxist-Leninist party that broke away from the Communist Party of Spain (PCE). The general secretary of the PCE(r) is Manuel Pérez Martínez ('Comrade Arenas') who was in prison from 2000 to March 2025 for terrorist activities.

== History ==
It was formed in 1975, by the remnants of the Organization of Spanish Marxist-Leninists (OMLE) which was dissolved that year. OMLE, which was operating from exile, had been formed through a 1968 split in the Communist Party of Spain (PCE).

Following the famous revolts in Paris in 1968, certain groups of leftist Spanish exiles were disappointed with the staunchly pro-Soviet and “frozen” stance of the Spanish Communist Party, the PCE and its leader Santiago Carrillo. This led in September of the same year to the foundation of the Organización de Marxistas Leninistas Españoles (OMLE) (Organization of Spanish Marxist-Leninists) in Brussels. In 1974 Organización Obreira, a Galician organization, joined the OMLE.

During the following years, this splinter group of Spanish Communists was inspired by ETA’s rise and by the military coup in Portugal that led to the Carnation Revolution. Thus it accumulated a number of sympathizers and well-wishers, especially among left-wing circles in the Spanish youth. Franco’s illness was also interpreted as an omen for a wide-open future and a promise of success for the PCE(r)'s ambitions and goals.

The OMLE renamed itself “Partido Comunista de España Reconstituido” in June 1975. Two months after Franco’s death, in January 1976, during the Spanish political transition from dictatorship to democracy, the PCE(r) began a "revolutionary struggle" against the political reforms of the newly established monarchy of King Juan Carlos I. In order to carry about its struggle, the PCE(r) restructured itself into different commissions. The party also established various "sectorial organizations", including a student union (Organización Democrática de Estudiantes Antifascistas), a prisoner-support group (Asociación de Familiares y amigos de Presos) and an "antirrepresie" organization (Socorro Rojo).

Despite its initial successes, the PCE(r) became increasingly a marginal group after certain key-measures were adopted by the transitional Spanish government. Foremost of these were the 1977 amnesty for political prisoners, the democratic normalization, and the growing success of the newly introduced measures adopted by the Spanish police and the Spanish courts to combat terrorism.

After the issuing of a new law concerning political parties in 2002, the Spanish authorities severely curtailed the activities of the PCE(r) in 2003. Currently the party is outlawed, although still exists as a clandestine organization.

Historically, the strongholds of the party have been Vigo, Cádiz, A Coruña and El Pozo del Tio Raimundo.

== Ideology ==
Originally the party was Maoist, advocating a people's war in Spain. Since the late 1990s the party abandoned Maoism in favour of more classic Marxist-Leninist positions.
