= Communist Party of Spain (Marxist–Leninist) =

Communist Party of Spain (Marxist–Leninist) Partido Comunista de España (marxista–leninista)
- Founded: 2006
- Headquarters: Madrid
- Newspaper: Octubre
- Youth wing: Communist Youth of Spain (Marxist–Leninist)
- Ideology: Communism; Marxism–Leninism; Stalinism; Hoxhaism; Anti-revisionism; Republicanism
- Political position: Far-left
- International affiliation: ICMLPO
- Colors: Red

Party flag

Website
- www.pceml.info

The Communist Party of Spain (Marxist–Leninist) (Spanish: Partido Comunista de España (marxista–leninista)) is an anti-revisionist Marxist–Leninist communist party in Spain, founded in 2006 by the Statewide Coordination of Communist Organizations (CEOC) and former PCE(ml) members.

First issue (November 2006) of "Octubre" as organ of the PCE (m–l)

PCE (m–l) publishes Octubre every month and is an active member of the International Conference of Marxist–Leninist Parties and Organizations (Unity & Struggle).

== See also ==
- List of anti-revisionist groups
