= May 1979 Madrid bombing =

Terrorist incident in Spain

During the evening of 26 May 1979, a bomb exploded in Madrid, Spain. Its detonation in the basement washroom of the California 47 café killed 10 people, injured another 40 and severely damaged the building. No group claimed responsibility, but the far-left First of October Anti-Fascist Resistance Groups (GRAPO) are believed to have been the perpetrators. Police found a second, unexploded bomb in the café.
