= Organisation of Marxist–Leninists of Spain =

Organisation of Marxist–Leninists of Spain Organización de Marxistas-Leninistas de España (OMLE)
- Founded: 1968
- Dissolved: 1975
- Split from: Communist Party of Spain
- Merged into: PCE (R), GRAPO
- Headquarters: Belgium
- Newspaper: Bandera Roja and Antorcha
- Ideology: Marxism-Leninism; Anti-Francoism; Mao Zedong Thought; Republicanism
- Colors: Red

Party flag

Organisation of Marxist–Leninists of Spain, in Spanish: Organización de Marxistas-Leninistas de España, (OMLE) was a Spanish communist group. OMLE was formed in Brussels in September 1968 by various nuclei that had left the Communist Party of Spain (PCE). OMLE denounced PCE as revisionist.

OMLE was a clandestine group along its existence owing to the pervasive activity of the Francoist police. It had its bases in a few urban pockets such as Cádiz and Vigo.

== History ==
The OMLE held its first conference in June 1973. It was listed as a secret subversive group by the Francoist information services.

In 1974 a sector of Organización Obreira joined the OMLE.

In October 1975 OMLE convened the founding congress of the Communist Party of Spain (Reconstituted) (PCE(r)), which together with the First of October Anti-Fascist Resistance Groups (GRAPO) acted as the continuation of OMLE.

== Publications ==
OMLE published Bandera Roja from 1969 onwards as its central organ and Antorcha as its theoretical organ. El Gallo Rojo was published by the Andalusia Regional Committee of OMLE.

The organization's directing committee issued a 9-page declaration that was published in 1974.

== See also ==
- Communist Party of Spain (Marxist–Leninist) (historical) (PCE (m-l))
- Spanish National Liberation Front (FELN)
