= First of October Anti-Fascist Resistance Groups =

Spanish far-left militant group (1976–2007)

First of October Anti-Fascist Resistance Groups Grupos de Resistencia Antifascista Primero de Octubre (GRAPO)
- Flag of the PCE(r) and the GRAPO, based on the Spanish Republic flag
- Dates active: 20 January 1976 – 6 June 2007 (31 years, 137 days)
- Country: Spain
- Allegiance: Communist Party of Spain (Reconstituted)
- Ideology: Communism; Marxism–Leninism; Maoism; Anti-revisionism; Socialism; Republicanism; Anti-imperialism; Anti-fascism; Anti-Western sentiment Anti-capitalism
- Status: Inactive

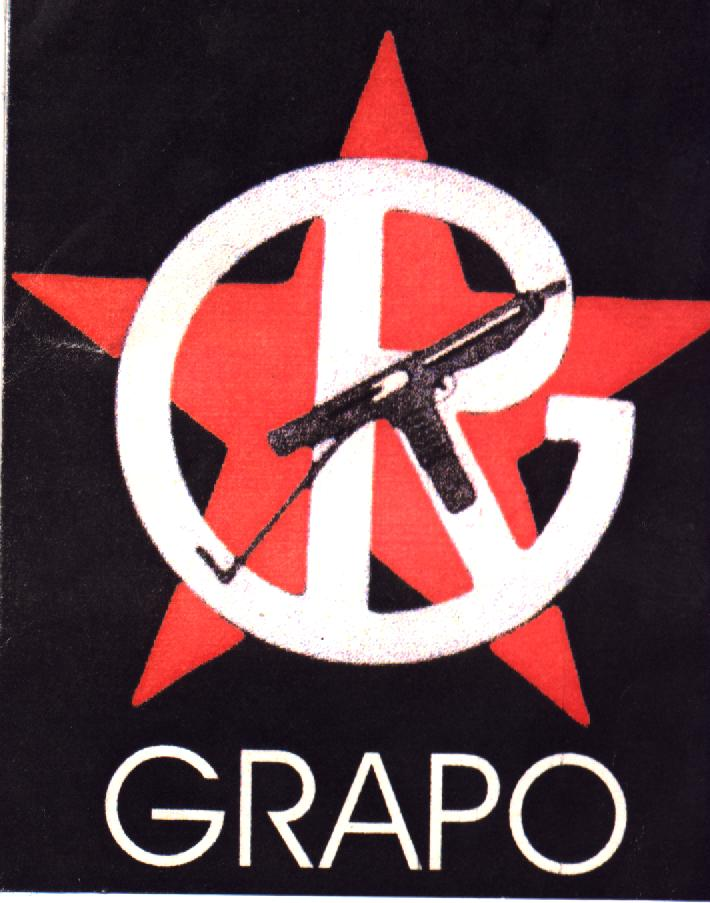
GRAPO main logo

The First of October Anti-Fascist Resistance Groups (Spanish: Grupos de Resistencia Antifascista Primero de Octubre, GRAPO) was a Spanish clandestine Marxist–Leninist group aiming for the formation of a Spanish Republican state.

The group was anti-capitalist, anti-imperialist, and strongly opposed Spain's membership in NATO.

GRAPO's last attack was in 2006. After having been fairly active in the late 1970s and early 1980s, a dwindling number of its militants along with police actions allowed Spanish officials to claim a number of times to have disbanded the GRAPO after the remaining militants were captured. According to the Spanish police, GRAPO was disbanded after six of its militants were arrested in June 2007 but formally, the group has not announced its dissolution.

GRAPO is included in the European Union's list of terrorist organisations.

== History ==
GRAPO has its origins in the Organisation of Marxist–Leninists of Spain (OMLE), which dissolved itself in its first congress in 1975. At the beginning of 1976, two months after General Francisco Franco's death, during the Spanish transition to democracy from dictatorship, the Communist Party of Spain (Reconstituted) (PCE-r) began a struggle against the political reforms. The PCE(r) restructured itself into different commissions; one of these was a "front against fascism", founded by Juan Carlos Delgado de Codex, which became the GRAPO.

This newly born movement was named after the killing of four Spanish policemen on 1 October 1975, the first violent action of the PCE(r). The "Antifascist Resistance Groups October First" (GRAPO) took this date as a starting point as a terrorist organization. Only five months later, after five workers were killed by the Spanish police during demonstrations in Vitoria-Gasteiz, the PCE(r) told its sympathizers to take up arms and create the nucleus of a future Spanish "Red Army" which would be directed by a central command. A number of explosive devices were detonated in different locations in Spain on 18 July 1976, and GRAPO claimed responsibility for the coordinated explosions in the press, becoming well-known overnight.

After the high-profile kidnapping of wealthy politician Antonio María de Oriol y Urquijo in 1976 and General Villaescusa in 1977 as well as the killing of more Spanish policemen, GRAPO became established as an urban guerrilla group, in a similar manner as Revolutionary Antifascist Patriotic Front (FRAP) had been in Francoist Spain.

GRAPO increased its activity from 1979 onwards, including the bombing of a café in Madrid on 26 May 1979, which killed nine people. However, the group's level of support waned during the 1980s. The transitional democratic regime was not destabilized as the group had promised.

In 1984 the Spanish authorities issued an anti-terrorist law inspired by the Italian model which facilitated police operations against GRAPO, and many arrests followed. GRAPO reacted by simplifying its structure while "waiting for better times". It continued its clandestine activities at a lower level by means of mobile militants, which easily formed and easily split up, becoming difficult to detect.

Police work caused serious blows to GRAPO's structure. Currently the group is inactive yet not formally self-dissolved.

== Summary of GRAPO's activity ==
Since its inception in 1975 until its last-known activity in 2006, it killed 84 people, including police, military personnel, judges, and civilians via bombings and shootings. A number of its militants were killed during bank robberies committed to raise funds for the organization. The group has also committed a number of kidnappings, initially for political reasons and later on for ransom. Its last attack was in 2006, when GRAPO shot dead Ana Isabel Herrero, the owner of a temporary work agency in Zaragoza.

In 2000 GRAPO's leader Manuel Pérez 'Arenas' was sentenced in a French court for criminal conspiracy with terrorist intent. Spain issued a request for his immediate extradition. He was released in 2025.

== Notable members ==
Spanish Paralympian Sebastián Rodríguez was a member of GRAPO .

== Supporters ==
In October 2011 Spanish hip hop artist Pablo Hasel was arrested for condoning terrorism after he saluted one of GRAPO's imprisoned members in a music video. He was soon released from jail, but the charges were not dropped. Ten years later on 16 February 2021, Hasel was arrested and imprisoned again on similar charges by the social democrat PSOE-UP government, leading to anti-fascist groups staging mass demonstrations across the country demanding the release of Hasel and other jailed PCE(r) and GRAPO members.

In February 2014 a Twitter user was convicted of glorifying terrorism for tweets praising GRAPO.
