= Julio Álvarez del Vayo =

Spanish politician, journalist, and writer (1891–1975)

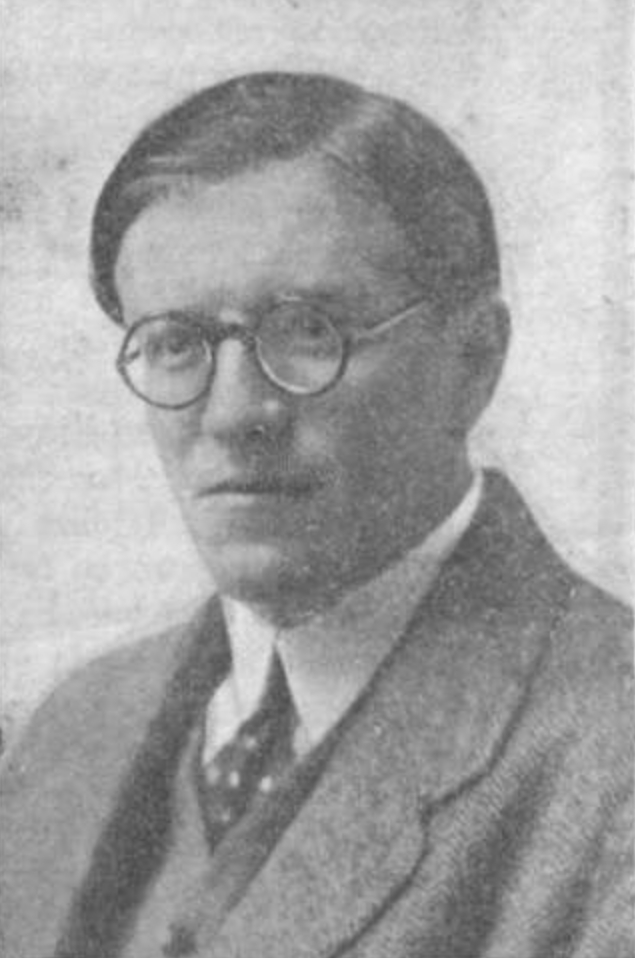
- Julio Álvarez del Vayo in 1927

Minister of State
- In office 4 September 1936 – 17 May 1937
- Preceded by: Augusto Barcía Trelles
- Succeeded by: José Giral
- In office 5 April 1938 – 31 March 1939
- Preceded by: José Giral
- Succeeded by: Francisco Gómez-Jordana Sousa

Personal details
- Born: Julio Álvarez del Vayo y Olloqui; 9 February 1891 Villaviciosa de Odón, Spain
- Died: 6 May 1975 (aged 84) Geneva, Switzerland
- Party: PSOE; USE; FELN; FRAP
- Education: University of Madrid; University of Valladolid; London School of Economics
- Occupation: Jurist, journalist, diplomat

Julio Álvarez del Vayo y Olloqui (9 February 1891– 3 May 1975) was a Spanish socialist politician, jurist, journalist, diplomat and writer.

== Biography ==
Julio Álvarez del Vayo y Olloqui was born in to an aristocratic family of a former army general. He studied Law at the Universities of Madrid and Valladolid and he did postdoctoral work at the London School of Economics. He joined the Spanish Socialist Workers' Party (PSOE) at a very young age and he opposed to the collaboration of that party with the dictatorship of Primo de Rivera (1923–1930). He wrote for the newspapers La Nación of Argentina, El Liberal and El Sol of Spain, and The Guardian of Britain. He visited the United States, the European Fronts during the First World War and the Soviet Union as a journalist.

In 1930, he conspired for an armed uprising against the monarchy. When the Second Republic was proclaimed he was appointed ambassador to Mexico and to the Soviet Union, and he was later elected as a member of the Parliament. He followed the PSOE's revolutionary wing led by Largo Caballero.

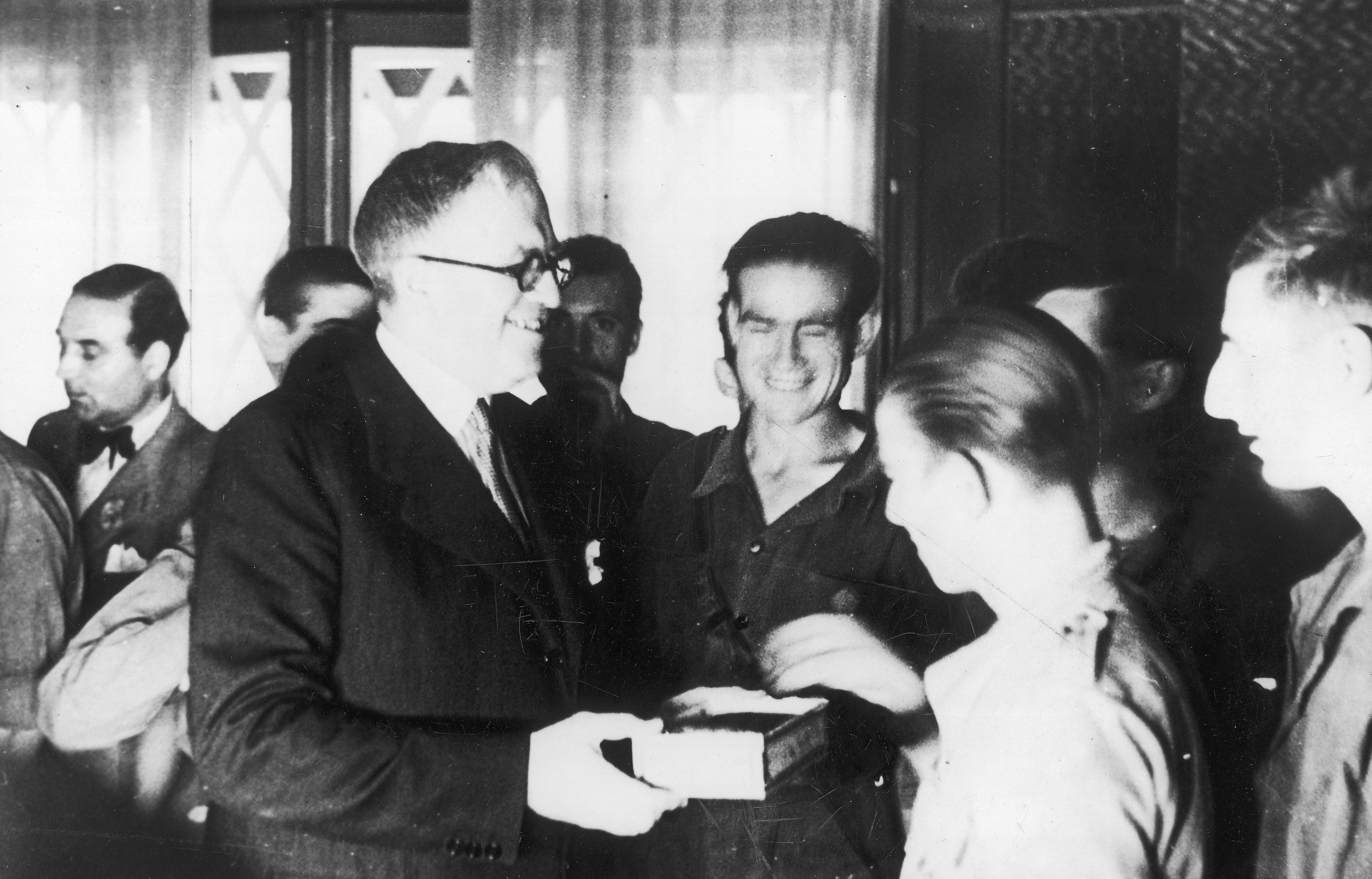
Álvarez del Vayo decorating Republican soldiers after the Battle of the Ebro

During the Spanish Civil War, Vayo held several political offices on the Republican side: he was twice minister of Foreign Affairs, delegate to the League of Nations and commissar and general of the Army. He was a member of the peace commission which monitored the dispute between Bolivia and Paraguay in 1933, at the peak of the Chaco War.

In his role as Foreign Minister, Vayo had repeatedly requested refuge for Spaniards fleeing Franco's Nationalist forces throughout Spain. In 1939 he wrote to Georges Bonnet to ask for the safe harbouring of over 150,000 Spanish Republicans in France. Bonnet declined "owing to the financial and other technical difficulties involved". After the Francoist conquest of Catalonia though the majority of the Republican leaders decided to remain in France, he returned to the Republican zone and led the last attacks against the Francoist troops. He fled by airplane from the base in Monòver, Alicante. shortly before the armistice.

In 1939, Vayo began writing for The Nation. He moulded much of the magazine's editorial tone on US foreign policy throughout World War II and the early Cold War as a member of the board of editors under Freda Kirchwey's editorship from 1941 to 1955. He was identified with the left wing of the Spanish Socialist Party and was reviled by the anti-Stalinist and liberal left, from Dwight Macdonald to Arthur Schlesinger for his sympathy for the Soviet Union.

During the 1940s and the 1950s, Vayo lived in exile in Mexico, the United States and Switzerland. He radicalized his political positions and was expelled from the PSOE. He then founded the Unión Socialista Española, which was very close to the Communist Party of Spain. In 1963, after the abandoning of armed struggle by the Communist Party and the waning of the activity of the Spanish Maquis, Vayo felt the need for a pro-Republican movement carrying out the armed struggle within Spain and established the Spanish National Liberation Front (FELN). However, the FELN as a group remained small and its activity was very limited owing to the effectiveness and fierceness of the Spanish police network. Finally in 1971 Álvarez del Vayo's FELN was integrated into the Revolutionary Antifascist Patriotic Front (FRAP). Vayo was the acting president of FRAP at the time of his death, which occurred on 3 May 1975 after suffering a cardiac failure on 26 April.

He was buried alongside his wife Louise. The mortuary concession ran out at the end of 2015. In 2016, the Association of Former Guerrillas in France (AAGEF-FFI), informed that his tomb was about to be destroyed, decided to take over the concession, as a precautionary measure, paid the €1,484 required for five years, an objective that was achieved.

== Writings ==
- La nueva Rusia. En camión por la estepa. Las dos revoluciones, siluetas..., Madrid: Espasa-Calpe, 1926
- La senda roja, Madrid: Espasa-Calpe, 1928
- La guerra comenzó en España: lucha por la libertad, Mexico City: Séneca, 1940
- Freedom's Battle, New York: Knopf, 1940
- The Last Optimist, New York: Viking, 1950
- Reportaje en China. Presente y futuro de un gran pueblo, Mexico City: Grijalbo, 1958
- China vence, Paris: Ruedo Ibérico, 1964
- Give Me Combat, Boston: Little Brown, 1973 (memoir)
- The March of Socialism, New York: Hill and Wang, 1974
