= Court of Public Order =

Tribunal de Orden Público
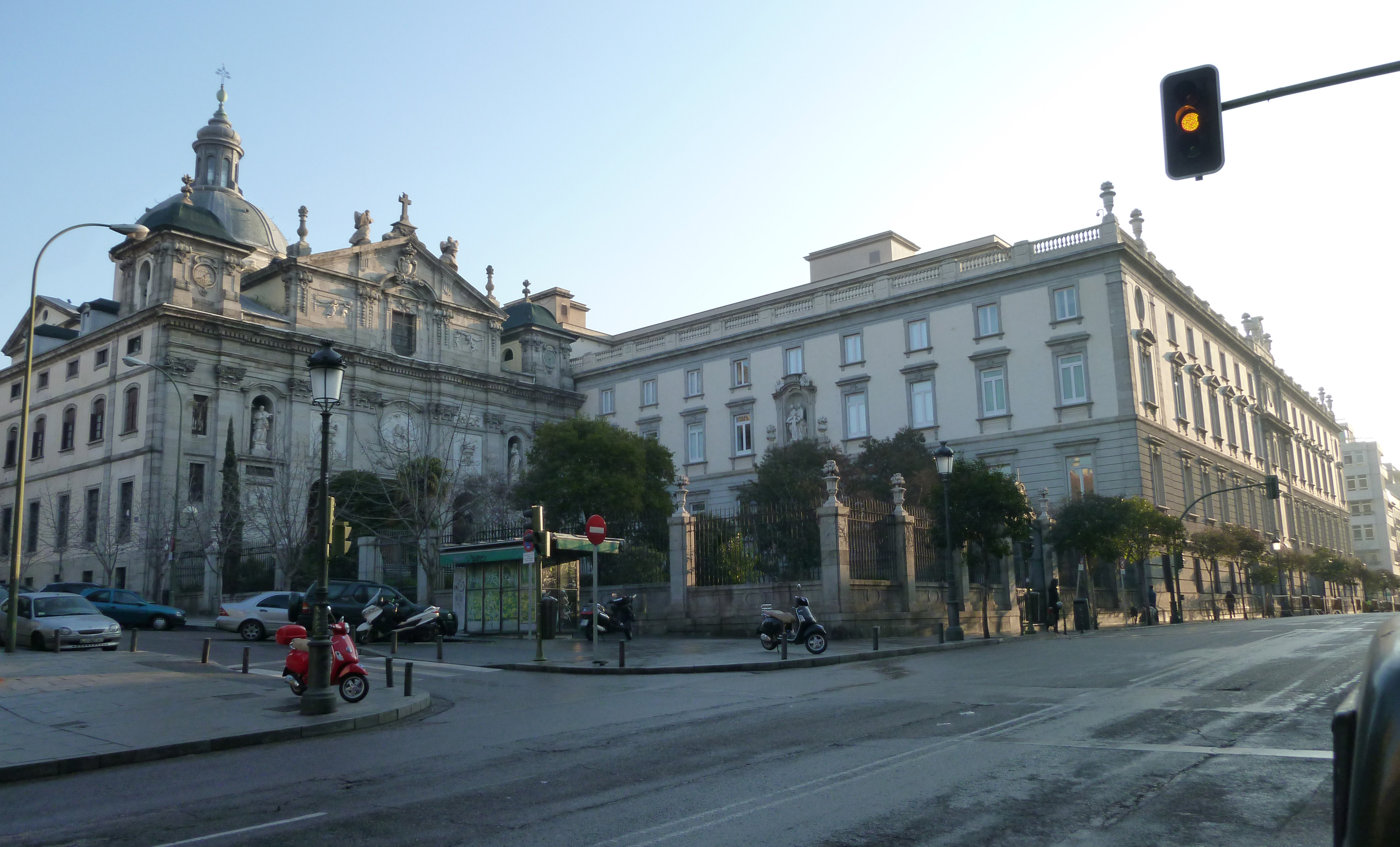
- The Convent of the Salesas Reales, headquarters of the Public Order Court
- Interactive map of Tribunal de Orden Público
- 40°25′28.3″N 3°41′37.94″W
- Established: December 1963
- Dissolved: January 1977
- Location: Madrid
- Coordinates: 40°25′28.3″N 3°41′37.94″W

The Court of Public Order (Spanish: Tribunal de Orden Público) was a court created in Francoist Spain to deal with most political crimes. It was instated as the supreme body in the newly created Public Order Jurisdiction, which also comprised an additional court, the Public Order Examination Court. This jurisdiction was considered an additional branch of the ordinary judiciary (thereby it was not considered to be special or exceptional by legal standards), together with the criminal, civil, administrative and social jurisdictions. It was not part of the military courts system. Nonetheless, the Court and its jurisdiction were always considered to be a special court.

Similar to the German People's Court in its goals, the court allowed for a rather fair process, leading on many occasions to the acquittal of the convict. Despite being considered a politically-oriented, biased court, the members of the court were all senior judges, many of them not members of the official party, and their decisions were made according to the then existing laws. There were instances, however, where many arbitrary decisions were taken.

It was established in December 1963, following Julián Grimau's execution by firing squad, replacing the Tribunal Especial para la Represión de la Masonería y el Comunismo. It was based in the Convent of the Salesas Reales in Madrid.

Though its main goal was to repress political crimes in Spain, the Court could not issue death penalties, as these could only be issued by military courts. Therefore, the most serious political and terrorist crimes were dealt with by the military courts, whose death sentences had to be signed by Franco personally.

== History ==
The Public Order Court's purpose was to guarantee the stability of the public order as defined by the Francoist State, by punishing within Spanish territory "those crimes whose characteristic was to subvert the basic principles of the state or to wreak havoc in the national conscience".

Some of the high-profile cases handled by the Tribunal de Orden Público during Franco's rule include the Caso Montenegro in 1964, following a string of explosions in Madrid, and the Proceso 1001 in 1973, in which the leaders of the Workers' Commissions (CCOO) trade union were imprisoned.

The Public Order Tribunal ceased operations by Royal Decree in 1977, two years after Franco's death. The Audiencia Nacional, one of the bodies established during the Spanish transition to democracy was created the same day in order to take charge of certain non-political crimes considered nationwide like terrorism.
