= José de Viera y Clavijo =

Spanish intellectual (1731–1813)

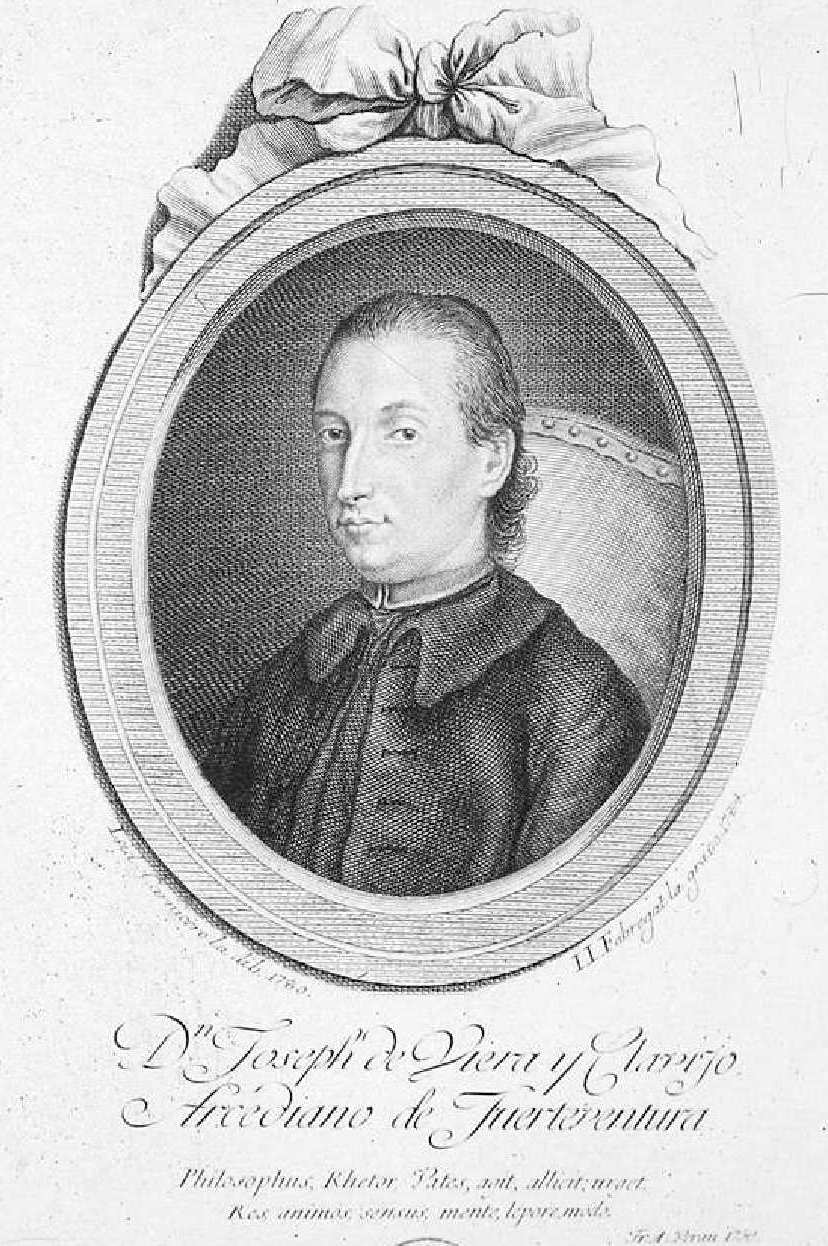
- Born: 28 December 1731; Realejo Alto, Canary Islands, Bourbon Spain
- Died: 21 February 1813 (aged 81); Las Palmas, Canary Islands, Napoleonic Spain
- Occupation: Intellectual
- Years active: 1756–1813
- Notable work: Historia de Canarias

Signature
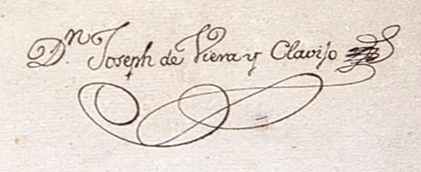

José de Viera y Clavijo (28 December 1731 – 21 February 1813), was a Spanish, of Portuguese descent, Enlightenment ecclesiastic, poet, historian, botanist, ethnographer, and professor. He is best known for his exhaustive History of the Canary Islands (Historia de Canarias), which took 20 years of work. He was assisted by Fernando de Molina Quesada, José Vandewalle, and others. The first volume was published in 1773, the second in 1774, the third in 1775, and the fourth in 1781. He recognized the Canaries as belonging to Africa and was a proponent of atlantonationalism. He recorded various expeditions from the Canaries in search of Saint Brendan's Island that occurred from 1487 to 1759. He investigated the influence of maritime activities in the Atlantic Ocean on the development of the islands. In this pursuit he also covered sailors such as Blas Zabala y Moreno, Francisco Díaz Pimienta, José Fernández Romero, José González Cabrera Bueno, and Tomé Cano. He was an admirer of Benito Jerónimo Feijóo y Montenegro and Voltaire, having been considered by scholarship after his time the "spiritual son" of the former.

== Biography ==
Viera was born in Realejo Alto, on the island of Tenerife, and was baptized at the Parroquia Matriz del Apóstol Santiago. He was the son of notary and town mayor, Gabriel Álamo y Viera and his wife Antonia María Clavijo. As a child, his family moved to La Orotava, where he was educated in scholastic theology at the convent of Santo Domingo. As stated in his memoir, it was here he grew fond of Benito Jerónimo Feijóo y Montenegro's work. At 18 years old, he received his minor orders in La Laguna; at 24 he got a preaching license; at 25 he entered major orders as a priest in Las Palmas.

In 1756, he began service as a priest at Los Remedios Church in La Laguna, residing there for 14 years. He was a member of the Tertulia de Nava, where he came in contact with rationalist Spanish Enlightenment ideas and local figures such as Cristóbal del Hoyo Solórzano y Sotomayor. Here he also pursued a wide variety of poetry: funeral prayers, loas, odes, and panegyrics. In 1770, he moved to Madrid and became the aide and preceptor of José Joaquín de Silva-Bazán's son, Francisco de Asís, receiving his patronage in return. For 14 years, he traveled Europe with the marquis and met scientific and literary thinkers such as Félix de Azara, Francisco Javier Lampillas, Jean le Rond d'Alembert, Pietro Metastasio, and Voltaire; from these traveling introductions he befriended Charles Messier, Jérôme Lalande, and Antonio José Cavanilles. Cavanilles taught him personal courses in chemistry and natural history, in turn affecting his writing. He became a corresponding member of the Real Academia de la Historia in 1774 and was made supernumerary by Pedro Rodríguez, Count of Campomanes in 1777.

In 1783, he returned to the Las Palmas Cathedral as archdeacon, never leaving the island afterwards and dying on 21 February 1813 in the city. His remains were put in the cathedral. He is commemorated in the name of the Jardín Botánico Canario Viera y Clavijo.

== Works ==
- Vida del noticioso Jorge Sargo, 1745
- Papel Hebdomadario, 1758 and 1759
- Memoriales del Síndico Personero, 1764
- Gacetas de Daute, 1765
- Carta filosófica sobre la Aurora boreal, 1770
- Historia de Canarias (4 volumes), 1773, 1774, 1775, and 1781
- El segundo Agatócles Cortés en la Nueva España, 1778
- Elogio de Felipe V, 1779
- Elogio de Don Alonso el Pintado, 1782
- El Hyerotheo, o Tratado Histórico de los antiguos honores y derechos del Presbiterio, 1799
- Diccionario de Historia natural de las Islas Canarias, 1799
- Noticias de la Tierra, 1807
- Noticias del cielo, 1811
- Los Vasconautas, undated
- Tragedia de Santa Genoveva, undated

== Bibliography ==
- Álvarez Santos, Javier Luis (2021). "África y el Atlántico a través de las islas Canarias durante la agregación portuguesa a la Monarquía Hispánica - Africa and the Atlantic through the Canary Islands during the Portuguese Integration into the Hispanic Monarchy: espacios de frontera y construcción atlántica". Estudios de Asia y Africa. 56 (2 (175)): 297–324. doi:10.24201/eaa.v56i2.2664. hdl:10362/119928. ISSN 0185-0164. JSTOR 27006095. S2CID 234836186.
- Freitag, Barbara (2013). Hy Brasil -- the metamorphosis of an island : from cartographic error to Celtic Elysium. Amsterdam: Rodopi. ISBN 9789401209106.
- Guimerá Ravina, Agustín (2017). "El mar en la obra histórica de Viera y Clavijo". Anuario de Estudios Atlánticos (63): 1–13. ISSN 2386-5571.
- Pérez Hernández, Nayra (2010). "África, materia para la definición de la literatura canaria". Afro-Hispanic Review. 29 (1): 135–152. ISSN 0278-8969. JSTOR 41349319.
- Santana, Yolanda Arencibia. "José de Viera y Clavijo | Real Academia de la Historia". dbe.rah.es. Real Academia de la Historia.
- (in Spanish)
