= Shrine of Our Lady of Mount Carmel (Los Realejos) =

Church in Los Realejos, Spain

Coordinates: 28°23′17″N 16°35′10″W

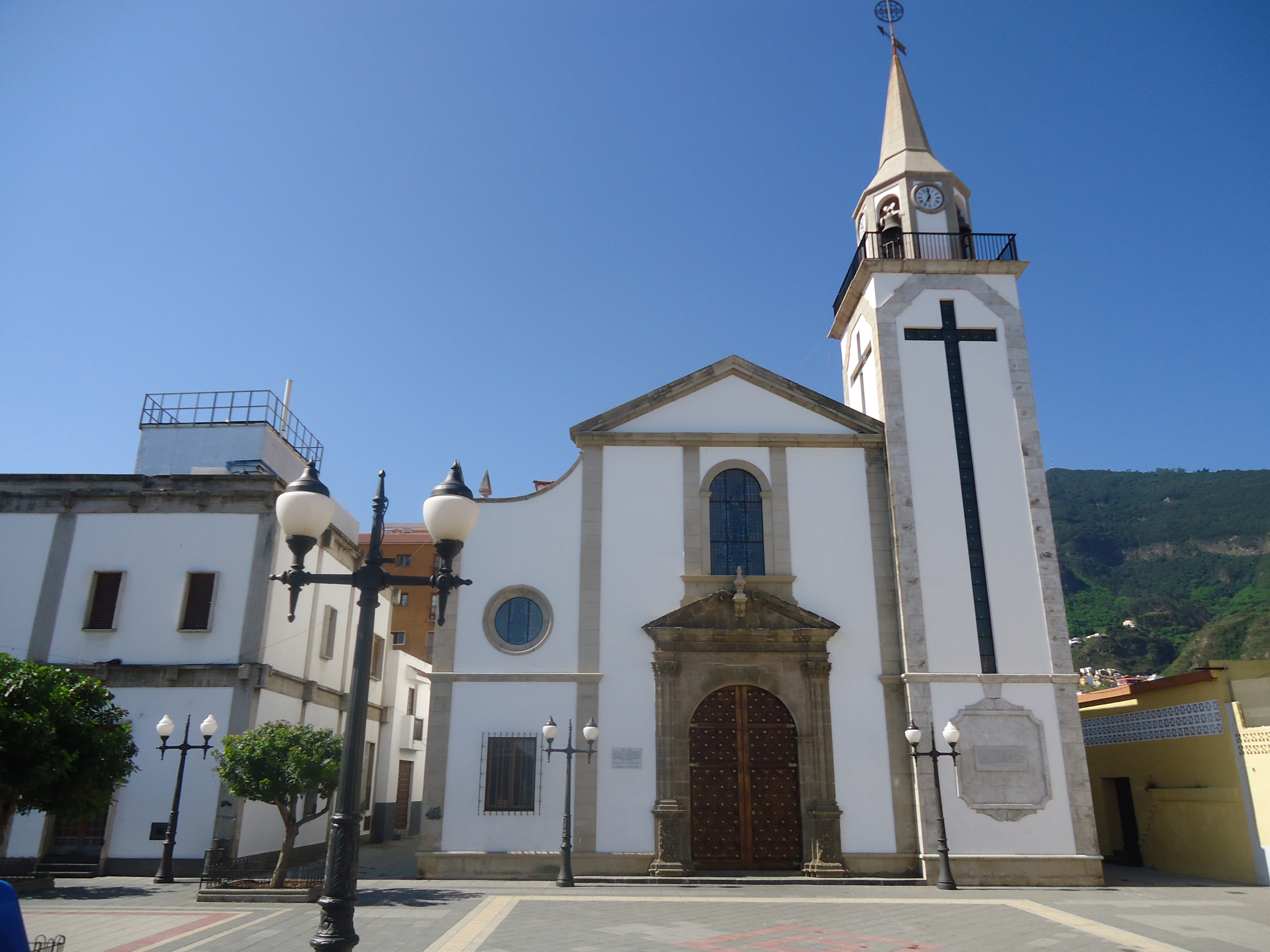
- Facade of the Shrine.

Religion
- Affiliation: Roman Catholic
- Diocese: Diocese of San Cristóbal de La Laguna
- Province: Archdiocese of Seville
- Ecclesiastical or organisational status: Marian shrine
- Year consecrated: 1965

Location
- Location: Los Realejos, Tenerife, Spain.
- Interactive map of Shrine of Our Lady of Mount Carmel

Architecture
- Architect: Tomás Machado
- Type: church
- Style: Neoclassicism
- Groundbreaking: 1955
- Completed: 1965

The Shrine of Our Lady of Mount Carmel (Spanish: Santuario de Nuestra Señora del Carmen) is a Roman Catholic church located in Los Realejos, in the north of the island of Tenerife (Canary Islands, Spain). It is located in the district of San Agustín.

It is considered the most important Marian shrine in the north of the island of Tenerife. The Our Lady of Mount Carmel is the patron of the La Orotava Valley.

== History ==
In the place where the present church the Convent of San Andrés and Santa Mónica (which belonged to the Augustinians) was. The February 21, 1952 a fire destroyed the convent. The July 24, 1955 was held the ceremony of blessing of the first stone of the new Shrine, the building was designed by Tomás Machado in 1953 and remained open for worship July 25, 1965.

The July 18, 1982, the image of the Virgin of Mount Carmel was one of the first images of the island Canonical Coronation.

Since 1999, the Shrine and its surroundings are considered of cultural interest of the Canary Islands (BIC).

The July 25, 2015, under the 50th anniversary of the consecration, the temple was declared a Shrine with the title of Bishop of the Diocese of Tenerife, Bernardo Álvarez Afonso.

== See also ==
- Roman Catholic Diocese of San Cristóbal de La Laguna
- Los Realejos
- Our Lady of Mount Carmel
