= Elevador de Aguas de Gordejuela =

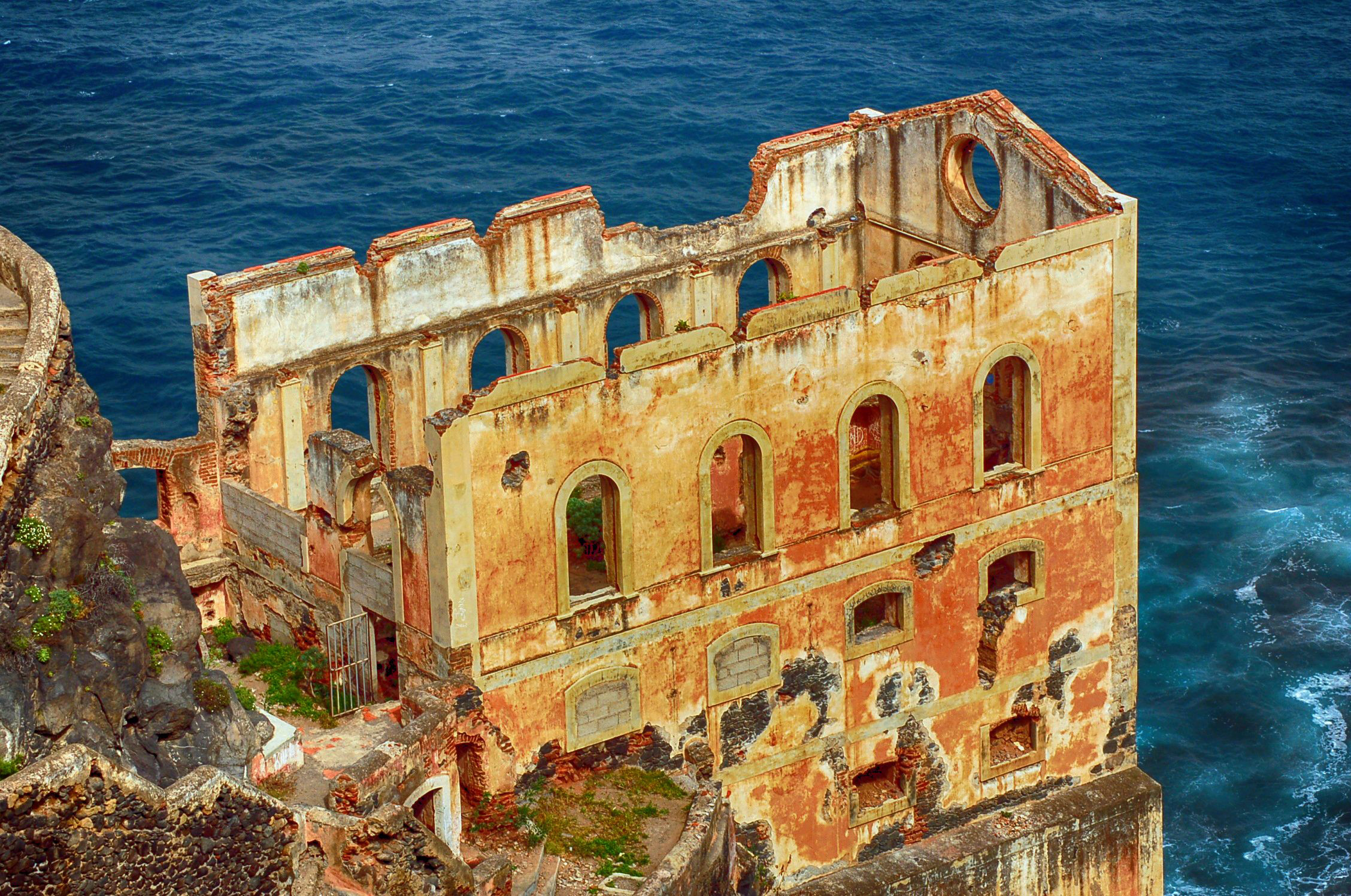

- Location within Tenerife

General information
- Status: ruins
- Type: pumping station
- Location: Los Realejos, Tenerife, Canary Islands, Spain
- Coordinates: 28°23′56″N 16°35′09″W
- Opened: 1903

El Elevador de Aguas de Gordejuela, also known as Casa Hamilton, is an industrial ruin near Los Realejos, Tenerife. It was built in 1903 by the Hamilton company to pump water from the Gordejuela springs to banana plantations in the Orotava Valley. The system used the first steam engine on Tenerife.

== Creation ==
It was built on the former location of the Juan de Gordejuela mill, adjacent to the Gordejuela waterfalls. In 1902 the British company Hamilton House (Casa Hamilton) bought all of the shares of the Gordejuela water society, of which it had been the main investor since 1898, and started the construction of the water lift. The system was designed by José Galván Balaguer, a military engineer, along with León de Torres and León Huerta.

The system was designed to raise water from the Gordejuela springs to the top of the cliff, some 200 metres (660 ft) above sea level, so that the fresh water could be used in banana plantations in the Orotava Valley, as well as to power a flour mill.

The construction of the complex cost around 1 million Spanish pesetas, and included the installation of the first steam engine on Tenerife.

== Layout ==
The facility originally had three buildings, as well as a warehouse and a chimney, along with connecting water-carrying structures. The building at the top of the cliff was designed to house workers. It is a one-storey rectangular building, with loadbearing walls supporting a gable roof on metal trusses. The western wall is attached to the ravine slope. A path leads to the rectangular building that held the boilers, of which only the west wall now remains. This building housed the steam engine, and had a 43 metres (141 ft) tall chimney, which no longer exists.

Around 80 metres (260 ft) vertical distance, 100 metres (330 ft) direct distance, or 175 steps away from the boiler building is the main building of the complex, located about 40 metres (130 ft) above sea level. The rectangular building is around 27 metres (89 ft) tall, with five floors. The foundation is built onto the cliff rock, and has a large block of mortared basalt in the lowest floor, with an east-west passageway. The second floor has two machinery rooms along with ventilation. The third floor has four rooms, two of which have now been buried by the collapse of the vaults. The fourth floor is the main entrance level, with lighter walls and arched openings. The fifth floor housed the main machine of the pumping station, with the remains of crane rails on the walls. It was once one of the largest buildings on Tenerife.

The water was stored in a reservoir around 2 kilometres (1.2 mi) away, at 290 metres (950 ft) above sea level, which had a capacity of 12,000 cubic metres (420,000 ft^{3}). A 12 kilometres (7.5 mi) aqueduct then took the water to the plantations.

== Decline ==
Casa Hamilton started losing money due to competition in the banana trade, and tried to sell water to other parts of the island, but this was not successful. It was leased to Elders and Fyffes in 1910, and it was sold in 1919 to the Fyffes company, and later entered the public domain. Water is still extracted from the springs, but it is now moved by electric motors.

It is now a ruin, without roof, doors or windows. Some of the arches and the floors have collapsed. In 2000 there was a proposal to restore the building and surrounding area for public use, but nothing subsequently happened. It was added to Lista Roja (Red List) on 31 January 2019 due to its state of abandonment, which could lead to a more substantial collapse of the structure. It is a popular tourist destination, with a walkway to the ruins, although the closest walkway is closed as of 2019. It is "one of the most spectacular abandoned buildings in Tenerife", and is surrounded by native flora including palm trees, tabaibas and dragon trees.
