= Luis Francisco Benítez de Lugo y Benítez de Lugo =

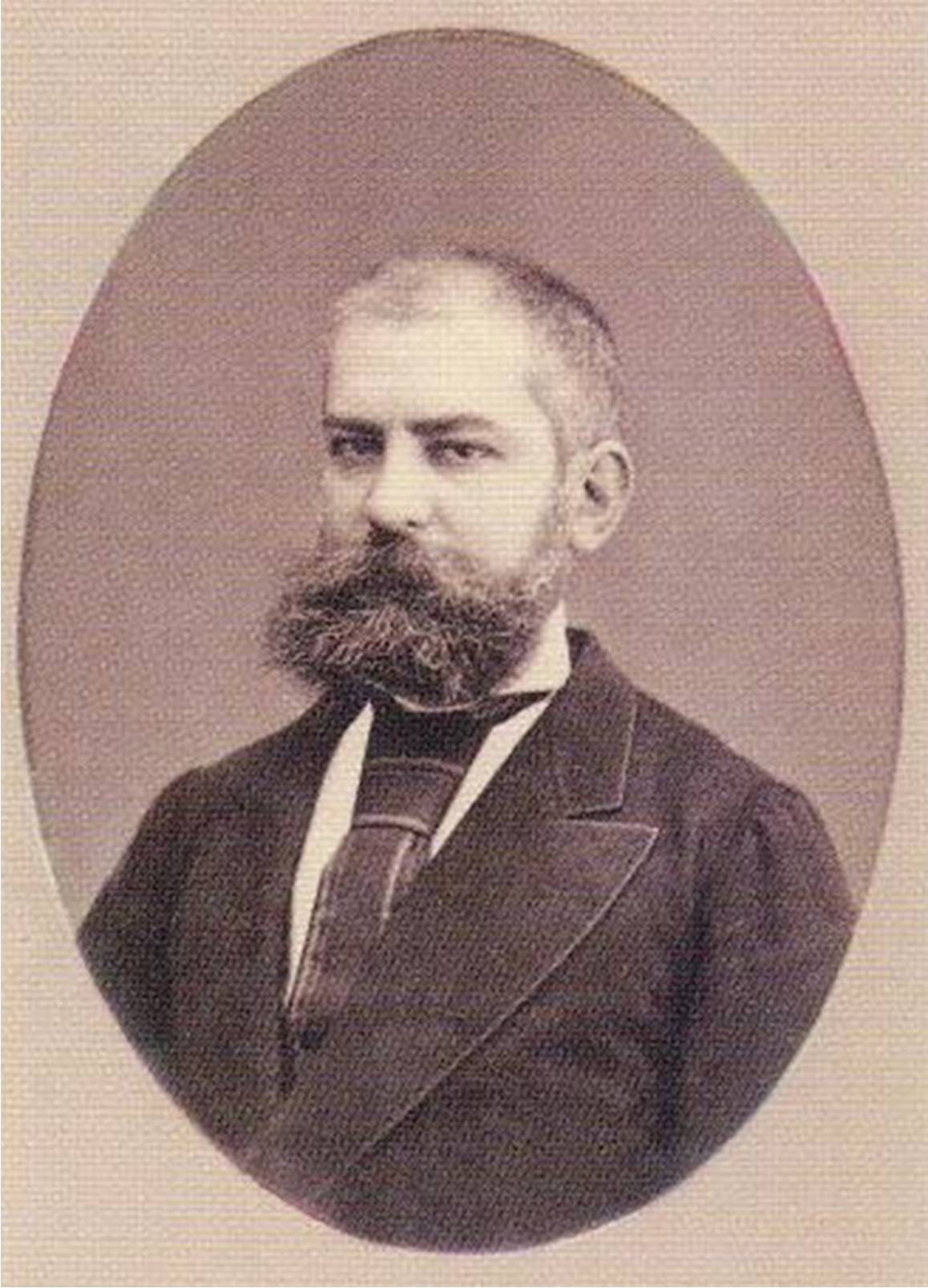
- Photography of Luis Francisco Benítez de Lugo.
- Born: 1 April 1837; La Orotava, Spain
- Died: 3 May 1876 (aged 39); Santa Cruz de Tenerife, Spain
- Occupation: Political
- Known for: Submit a bill to carry out the official teaching of Spiritism.

Luis Francisco Benítez de Lugo y Benítez de Lugo (La Orotava, Tenerife, April 1, 1837-Santa Cruz de Tenerife, May 3, 1876) was a Spanish politician, VIII Marquis of Florida and X Lord of Algarrobo and Bormujos. Elected deputy for the district of La Orotava in the elections of August 1872, he was re-elected in the elections held in May 1873, after the proclamation of the First Spanish Republic. Freemason and pioneer of Spiritualism in Spain.

== Biography ==
He studied at the Provincial Institute of the Canary Islands in the city of San Cristóbal de La Laguna. In 1859 he went to Madrid where he studied Law and Philosophy and Letters at the Central University of Madrid (current Complutense University).

In 1860 he joined the Progressive Party, while he began his literary work by collaborating in various newspapers. In 1863 he obtained the bachelor's degree in Administrative Law and in 1864 the bachelor's degree in Civil and Canon Law. His intense participation in politics increased at this time, and he was appointed Canarian representative in the Central Committee of the Progressive Party.

In 1871 Luis Francisco Benítez de Lugo entered Freemasonry, also being considered one of the great pioneers of Spiritism in Spain. Benítez de Lugo presented a bill for the official teaching of Spiritism, reading it on August 26, 1873.

He was part of the majority in the last courts of the reign of Amadeo I of Spain. Years later, Benítez de Lugo led a fiery protest when the United States Government wanted to buy the island of La Graciosa for 20 million reais.

He died at the age of 39 on May 3, 1876, in Santa Cruz de Tenerife. He was buried in the San Rafael and San Roque Cemetery in this city and later his remains were transferred to the Santa Lastenia Cemetery in the same city.

== See also ==
- Freemasonry
- Spiritism
