= British School of Tenerife =

International school in Tenerife, Spain

Coordinates: 28.38808°N 16.58117°W

Information
- Established: 1967
- Age: 18 months to 18 years
- Language: English
- Website: https://www.britishschooltenerife.com/

British School of Tenerife is a British international school in Tenerife, Spain.

== Structure ==
The school serves levels early years through sixth form college. There is a playgroup for students from 18 months old. The school has campuses in La Orotava and Los Realejos.

== History ==
It was founded in 1967.
