= Matías de Escobar y Llamas =

Spanish monk

- Born: 25 February 1680 or 1688; La Orotava, Tenerife, Spain
- Died: 1748; Morelia, Mexico
- Occupations: Friar, speaker and writer
- Notable work: Americana Thebaida (1724)

Matías de Escobar y Llamas (25 February 1680/1688 – 1748) was a Spanish religious of the Order of Saint Augustine. He is known for his work Americana Thebaida (1724), one of the most important treatises of Mexican colonial historiography.

== Biography ==
Born in La Orotava, in the north of the island of Tenerife (Canary Islands). In his youth, he emigrated with his parents to New Spain. In 1706 he received the religious habit in the convent of Yuririapúndaro; on 25 May 1714 he was ordained priest.

Later, he studied to teach theology and worked as a teacher between 1719 and 1727.

His most famous work is Americana Thebaida, written in 1724 and published in 1729. The book describes the province of Michoacan, and a study of ethnic groups living in the region before the conquest, especially the Tarascan ethnic and traditional images of Jesus Christ made in cornmeal. The work the origin of the Order of the Augustinians in Mexico and his arrival in Michoacan also recounts.

Fray Matias was a speaker reputation for what was ordained a priest in various communities and cities. In 1729, he was appointed provincial Augustinian chronicler of Michoacan.

In 1748, he died in Valladolid (now Morelia), where he was provincial prior.
