= Orotava Valley =

Coordinates: 28.37°N 16.54°W

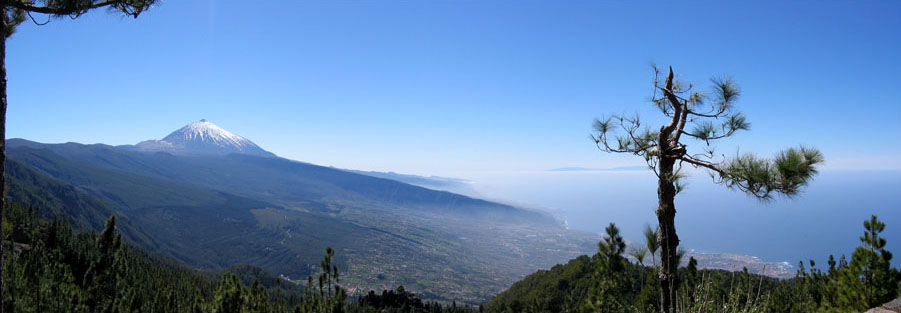
Orotava Valley, view towards Pico de Teide

The Orotava Valley (Spanish: Valle de la Orotava) is an area in the northern part of the island of Tenerife, Canary Islands, Spain. The valley measures 10 kilometres (6.2 mi) by 11 km, and stretches from the north coast to about 2,000 m elevation, at the northern foot of Pico del Teide.

== Background ==
To the west and east, the valley is delimited by two steep escarpments, respectively the Ladera de Tigaiga and the Ladera de Santa Ursula. The Orotava valley formed as the result of a large landslide some 560,000 years ago. The valley takes its name from La Orotava, the largest town in the area. Other towns are Los Realejos and Puerto de la Cruz. In the era of the Guanches, before the conquest by the Spanish in 1496, the valley was known as Taoro.

It was here the conquest of Tenerife ended on July 25, 1496, with the Treaty of Los Realejos between the Taoro mencey and Alonso Fernández de Lugo. It was in honor of the cessation of hostilities that the first Christian church, Parroquia Matriz del Apóstol Santiago, in honor of the patron saint of Spain, was built.

== See also ==
- Tigaiga
