= Casa de los Balcones =

Museum in the Canary Islands

Coordinates: 28°23′18″N 16°31′33″W

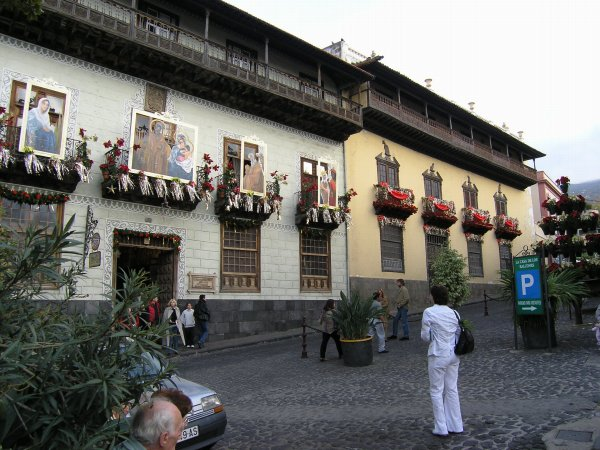
The front of the La Casa de los Balcones

La Casa de los Balcones (Spanish for "the house of the balconies") is a historic house and a museum in La Orotava on the island of Tenerife in the Canary Islands.

== History ==
It was first built in 1632. It offers a great variety of typical Canarian products which one of then includes artwork, embroideries ceramics and more. The building has three stories, it features five balconies and at the second story, they are made out of wood. The patio features plants.

It has an artwork complex which is the most famous in the Canary Islands. It also has a training centre. Thousands of people visit the building in numerous departments. In the Casa de los Balcones has the crafts of Eladia Machado. In various living rooms, it features artwork. It became a tourist attraction of northern Tenerife.
