= Tertulia de Nava =

Canary Islands Enlightenment circle

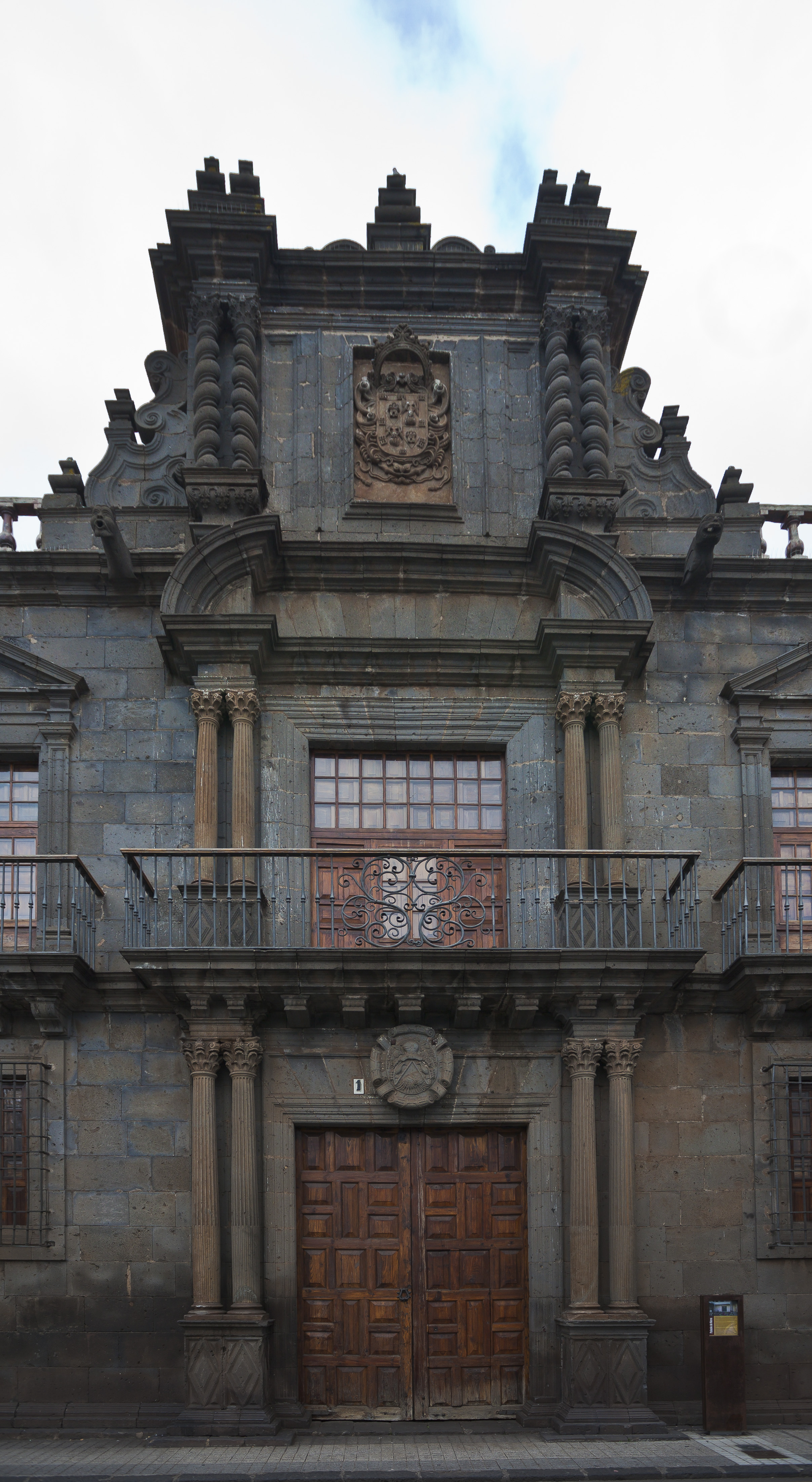
Nava Palace

The tertulia de Nava was a Spanish Enlightenment intellectual circle in San Cristóbal de la Laguna that regularly met at Nava Palace. From its creation by Tomás de Nava-Grimón y Porlier to its heyday under his son Alonso de Nava y Grimón, the union brought together grand personalities from Tenerife and the rest of the Canary Islands, such as Fernando de la Guerra y del Hoyo-Solórzano, Fernando de Molina y Quesada, Lope Antonio de la Guerra y Peña, Juan Antonio de Urtusáustegui, José de Llarena y Mesa, Agustín de Betancourt, and others. José de Viera y Clavijo was the major promoter and architect of the tertulia as he was integral to the culture of the Canary Islands during the 18th century.
