= La Orotava =

- Municipality
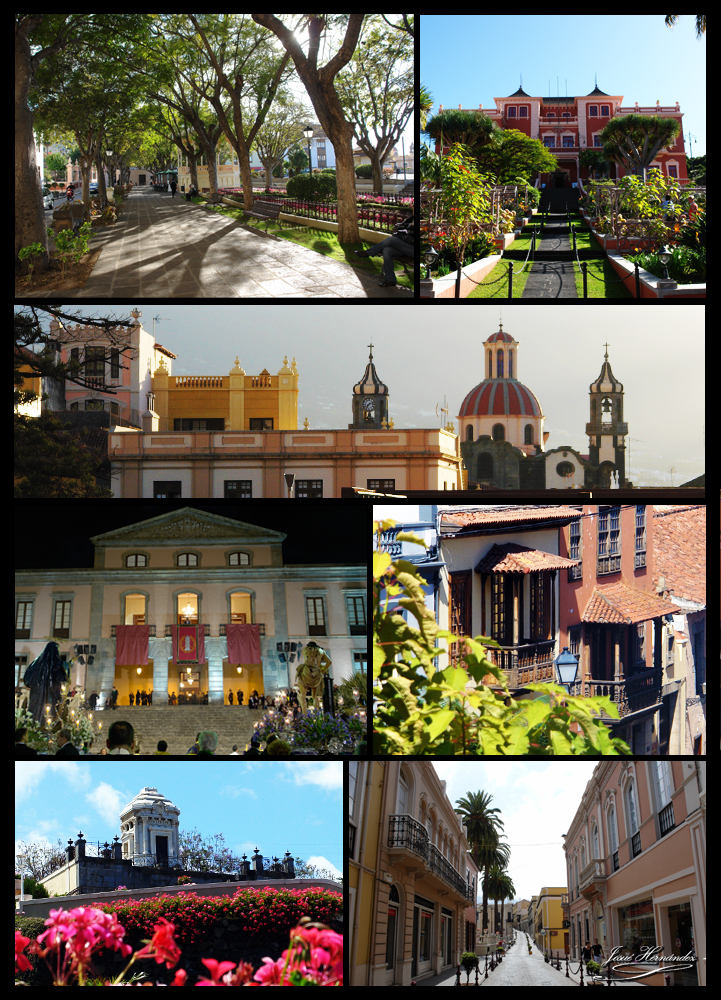
- La Orotava

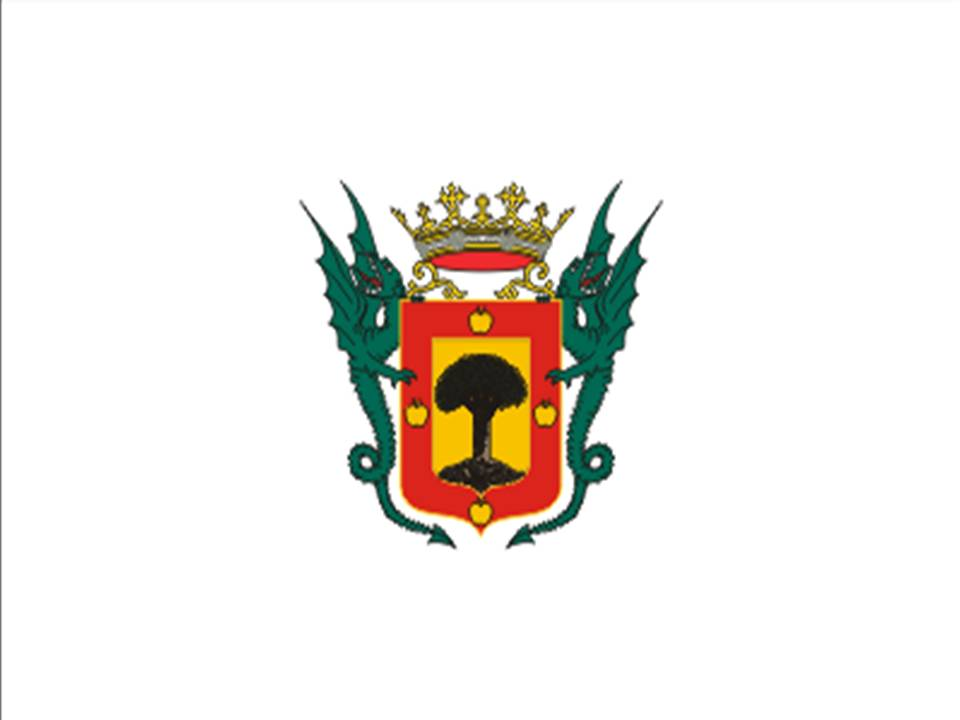
- Flag Coat of arms
- Interactive map of La Orotava
- Location within Tenerife
- Coordinates: 28°23′26″N 16°31′29″W
- Country: Spain
- Autonomous community: Canary Islands
- Province: Santa Cruz de Tenerife
- Island: Tenerife

Government
  - Mayor: Francisco Linares (CC)

Area
  - Total: 207.31 km^{2} (80.04 sq mi)

Population (2025-01-01)
  - Total: 42,514
  - Density: 205.07/km^{2} (531.14/sq mi)
- Time zone: UTC+0 (GMT)
- Post Code: 38300
- Climate: Csb
- Website: www.villadelaorotava.org

La Orotava is a town and a municipality in the northern part of Tenerife, one of the Canary Islands of Spain. The area of the municipality stretches from the north coast to the mountainous interior, and includes the summit of the Teide volcano, Canary Islands' and Spain's highest point at 3,718 m. At 207.31 km^{2}, it is the largest municipality of the island of Tenerife. The population is 41,255 (2013).

The town La Orotava, which is the administrative centre of the municipality and also its largest settlement, is situated near the north coast, at about 400 m elevation in the Orotava Valley. It is 4 km southeast of Puerto de la Cruz and 28 km southwest of the island's capital, Santa Cruz de Tenerife. The TF-5 motorway passes through the north of the municipality.

The coat of arms of La Orotava was adopted by Alfonso XIII in 1906, the dragoons escorting the drago and the tree of golden apples refers to the mythology of the Garden of Hesperides, believed was located in La Orotava. In gastronomy, La Orotava was honored for the Denominación de Origen Valle de La Orotava or the Denomination of the Origin of the Orotava Valley (Valle de La Orotava) in wines.

The historic center of La Orotava was declared Conjunto histórico in 1976 and is included in the Inventory of the European Cultural Heritage Protection and Monumental. Also noteworthy is that much of the Teide National Park (a World Heritage Site in 2007) is located within the municipality. La Orotava is also the highest town of Spain and steepest, the municipality comes from sea level up to 3718 meters the Teide (the highest peak in Spain).

== Toponymy ==
It is not known what the origin of the town's name is, but the vast majority of researchers say it probably originated from the language of the Guanches, who called the area Arautaba or Arautápala. Taking linguistics into account, Orotava probably came from a corrupted form of a Guanche word that was then borrowed into the Spanish language.

== History ==
The Guanches lived primarily in coastal areas and in the vicinity of the largest canyons and hillsides in the valley. In these places food and means of subsistence were easily found. For the Guanches, the highest peak in Spain (Mount Teide), which is situated in this township, was regarded as a place of worship.

On the arrival of the Spanish conquistadores, such as Alonso Fernández de Lugo, the people of Tenerife resisted. Tenerife was the last of the Canary Islands to be conquered, in 1496. The origin of La Orotava goes back to the 1502 when the land and water were portioned out among the men who had taken part in the conquest.

== Economy ==
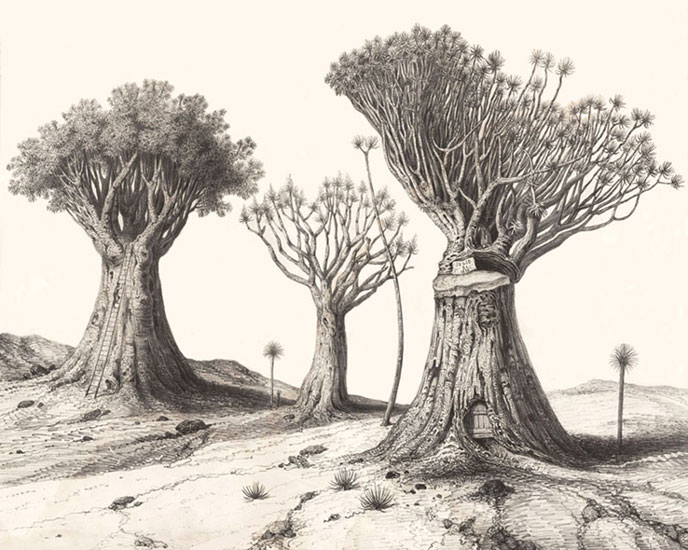
Engraving realized by the French naturalist Sabin Berthelot of the dracaena draco located in the garden of the House Franchy, in La Orotava. Published in his work Histoire Naturelle des Iles Canaries in 1838

The export economy established by the European settlers after the conquest in the 15th century spawned large commercial and passenger movements that were to last for decades. The first foreign visitors quickly felt drawn to the clemency and beneficial qualities of weather conditions found in the Taoro Valley.

La Orotava has a rich land for farming and its economy has been based on agriculture for centuries, with products such as wine, tomatoes, bananas and others that were exported mainly to Europe and the UK.

It was not until beginning of the 19th century that the tourism industry broke through. The natural environment of La Orotava helped attract many researchers and exclusive high-class groups from Europe. At this stage La Orotava was a leading cultural center accommodating many travellers and writers, among others William Wilde and Alexander von Humboldt.

Nowadays, La Orotava is visited by Northern Europeans all year round, specially during the winter months when the climate is quite mild, and over Christmas and New Year.

== Subdivisions ==
The Orotava Valley stretches from the sea up to the mountains at 2,000 m which begins near Las Cañadas up to Pico del Teide at 3,718 m is Spain's tallest mountain. The valley includes the municipalities of Los Realejos, Puerto de la Cruz and La Orotava, with a combined population of 111,606 as at the start of 2023.

La Orotava is subdivided into various locations such as El Rincón, La Florida, La Perdoma, San Antonio, La Luz or Aguamansa, among others

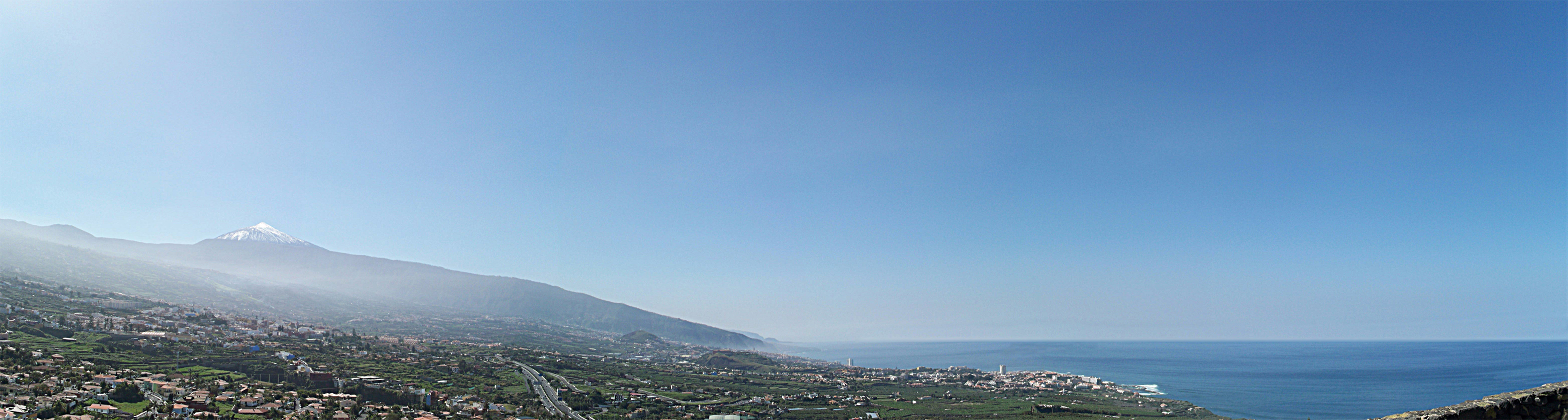
Panorama of Valle de La Orotava

== Historical population ==
Year	Population
1991	35,142
1996	35,642
2001	38,670
2002	39,095
2003	39,876
2004	39,909
2011	41,706
2013	41,255

== Education ==
The British School of Tenerife has its La Luz Campus in La Orotava.

== Sites of interest ==
- El Ayuntamiento (town hall)
- Mirador Humboldt, after Alexander von Humboldt, from the greatest panoramic attraction over the valley.
- Casa Molina
- Plaza de San Francisco
- La Casa de los Balcones
- El Teide, which is Spain's highest mountain
- Iglesia de La Concepción (church), one of the best examples of Baroque era in the Canary Islands
- Sociedad Liceo de Taoro

== Photos ==
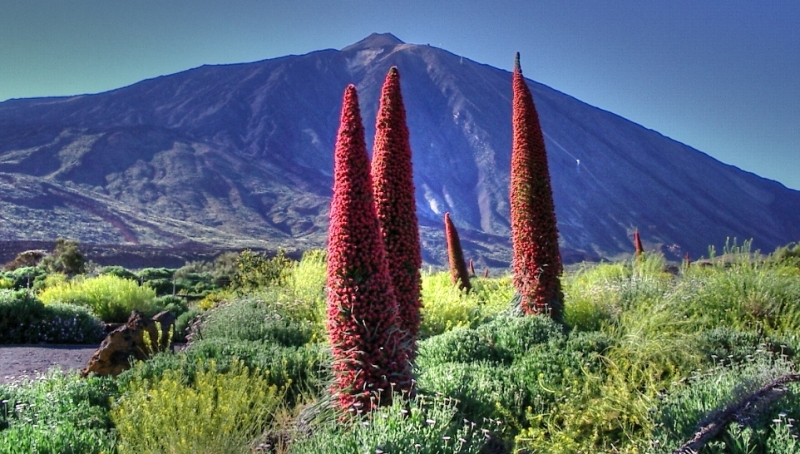
Teide

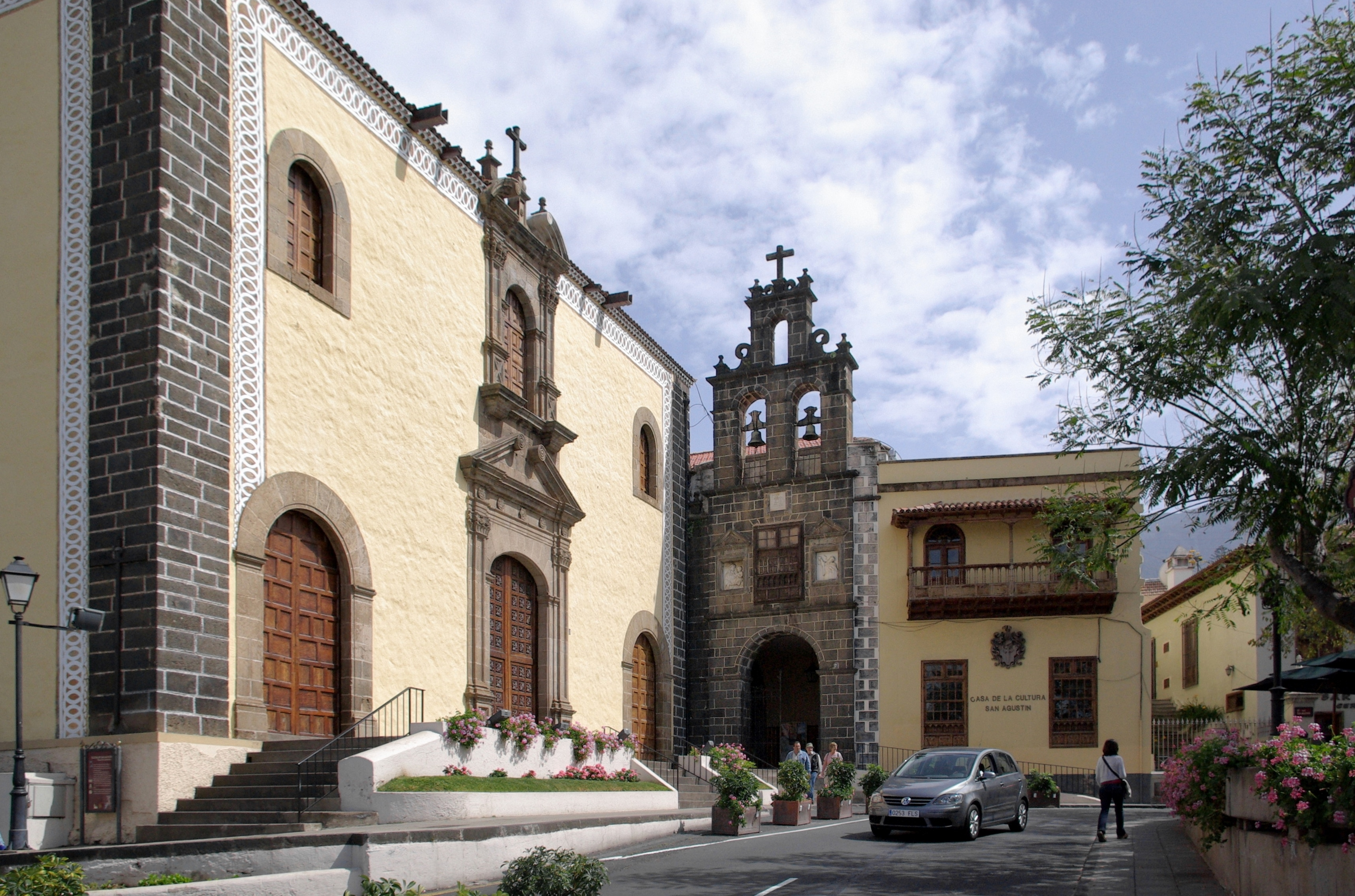
San Agustin

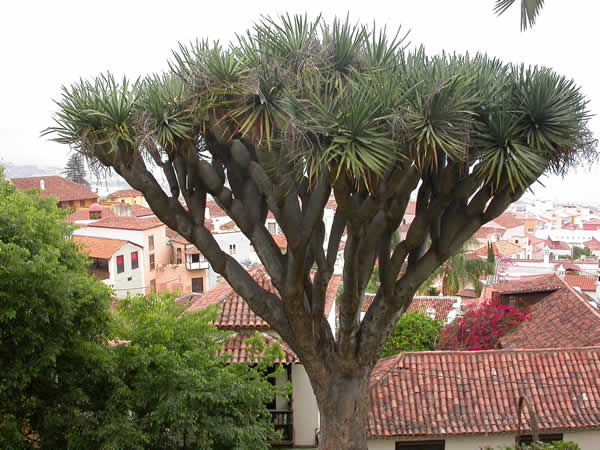
Drago in La Orotava

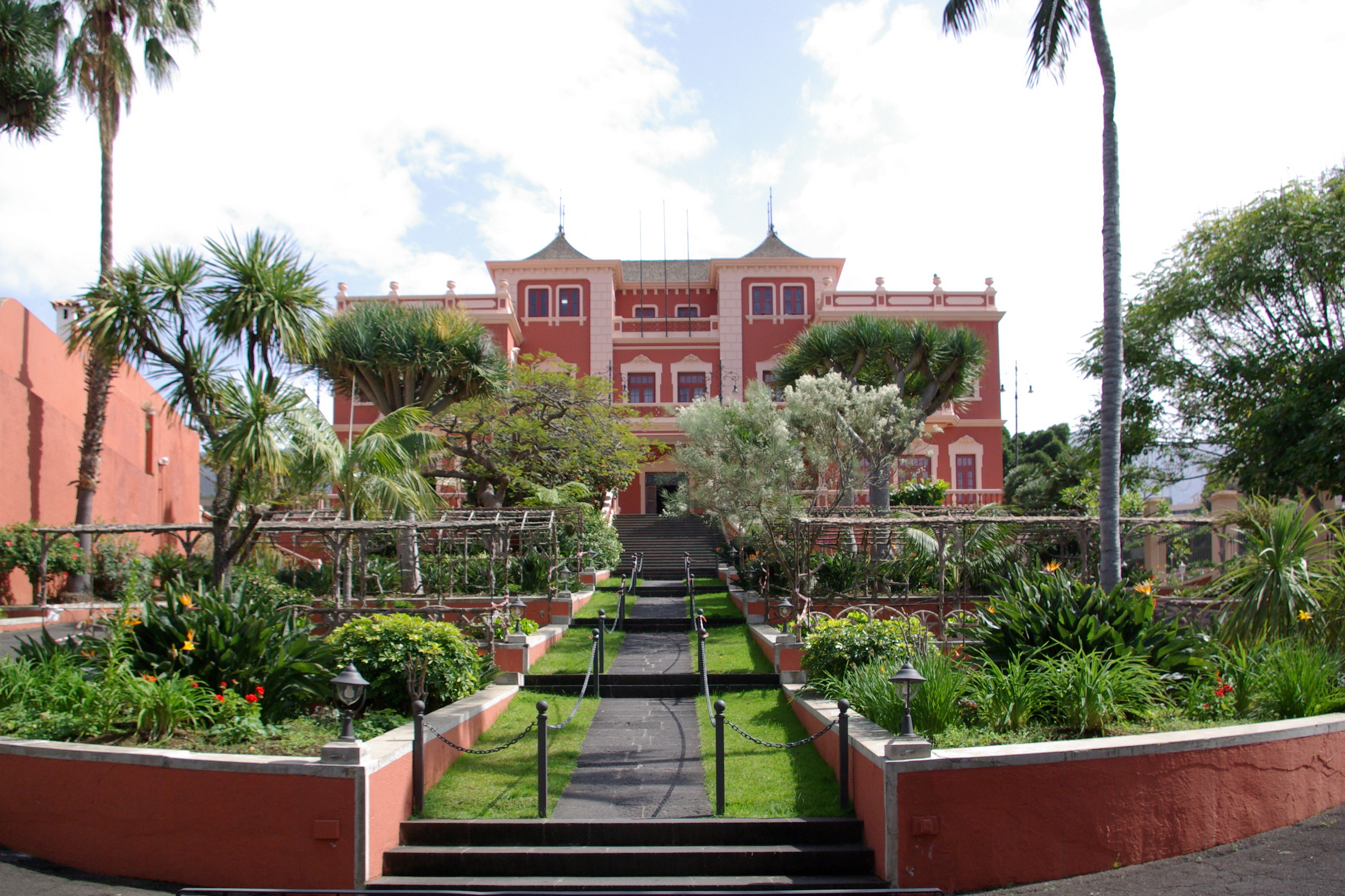
Liceo de Taoro

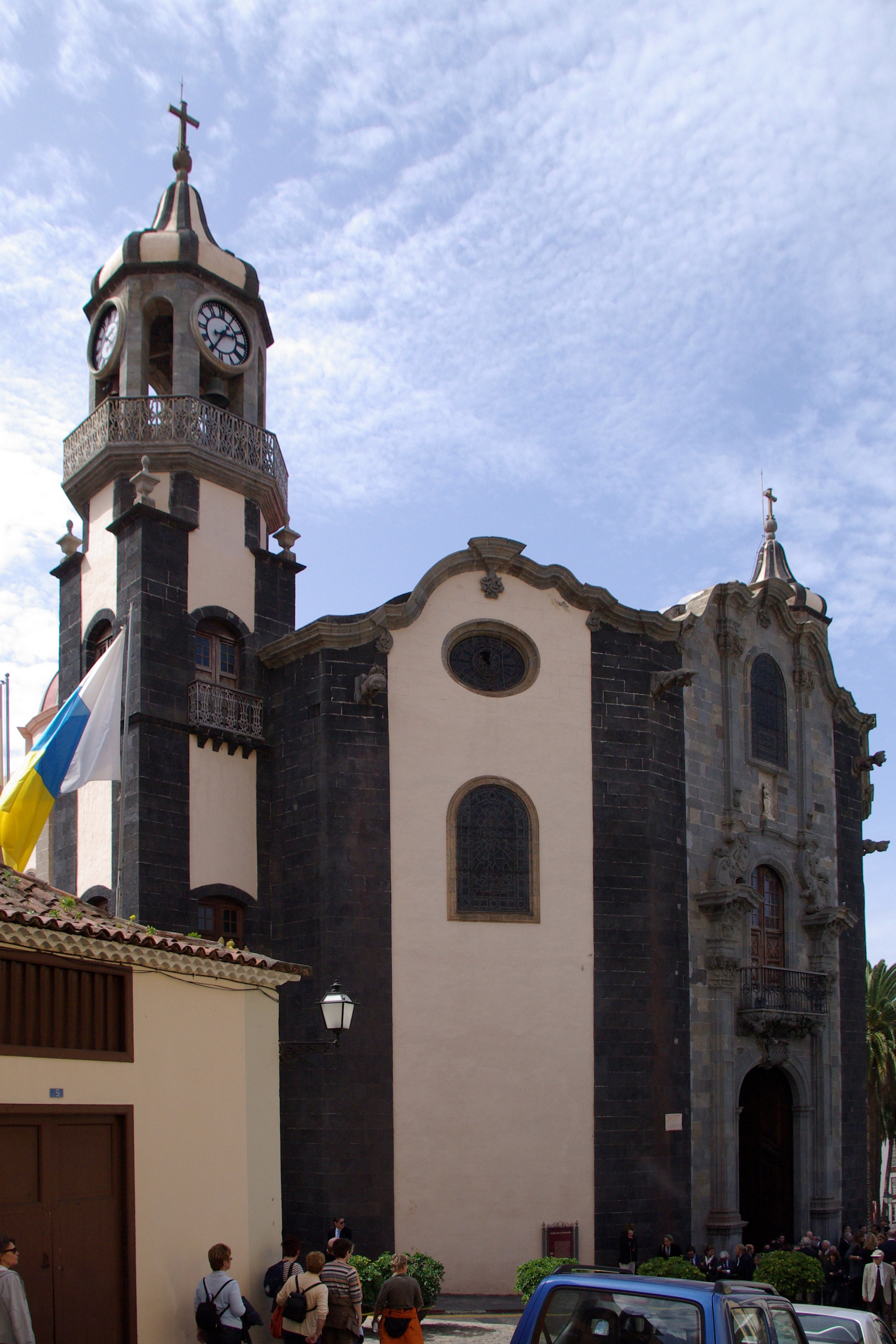
Church Nuestra Señora de la Concepción

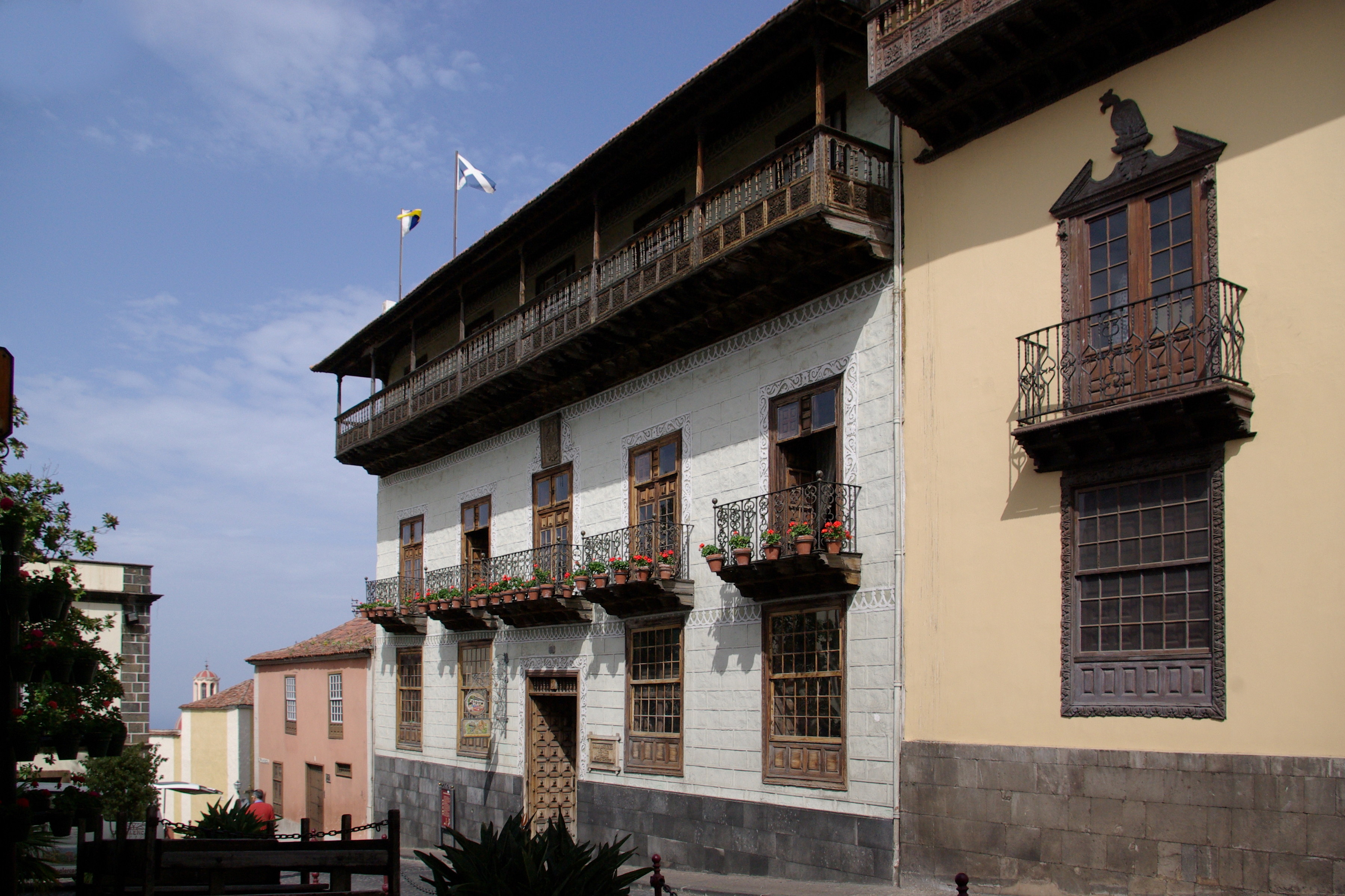
Casa de los Balcones

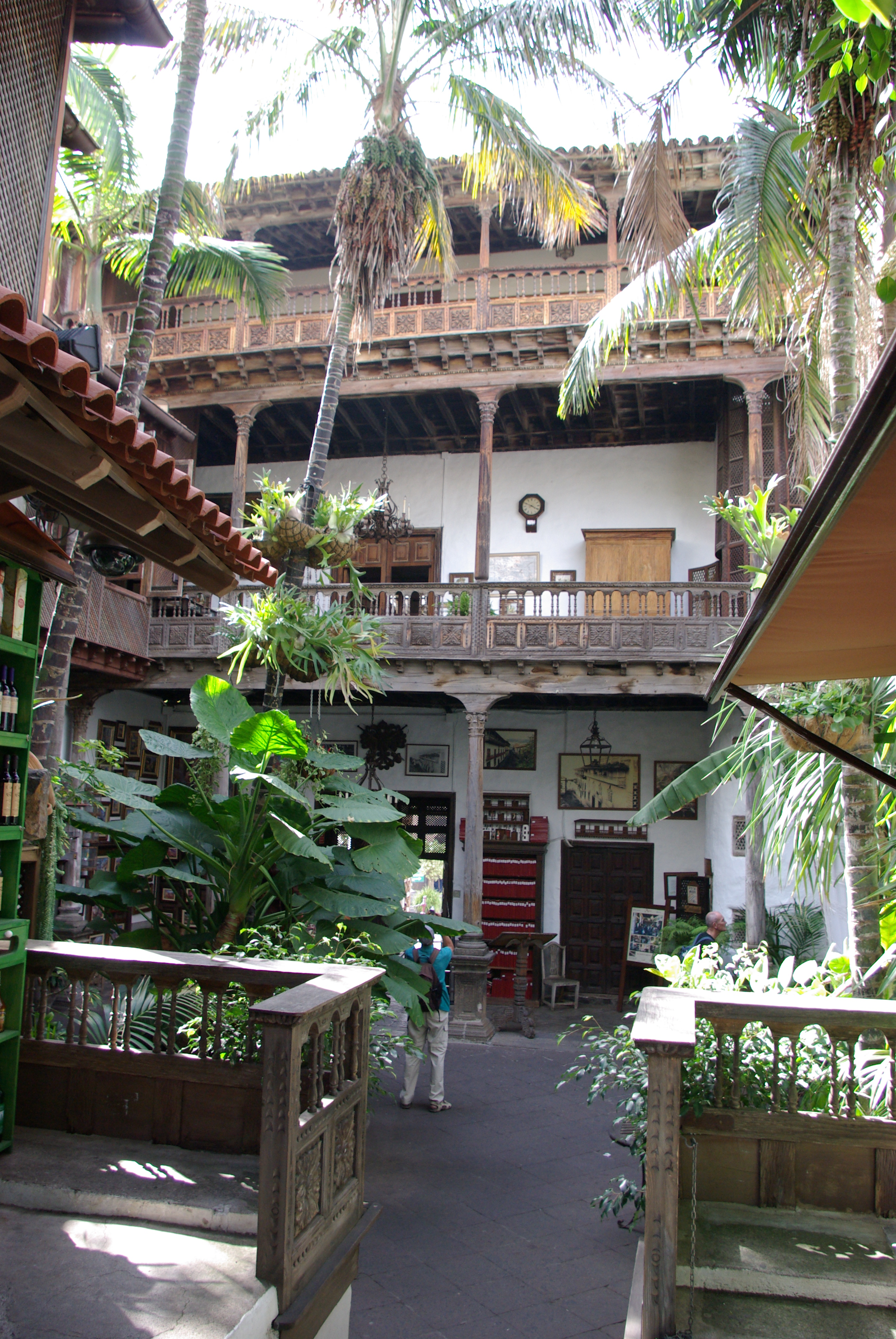
Casa de los Balcones, Patio

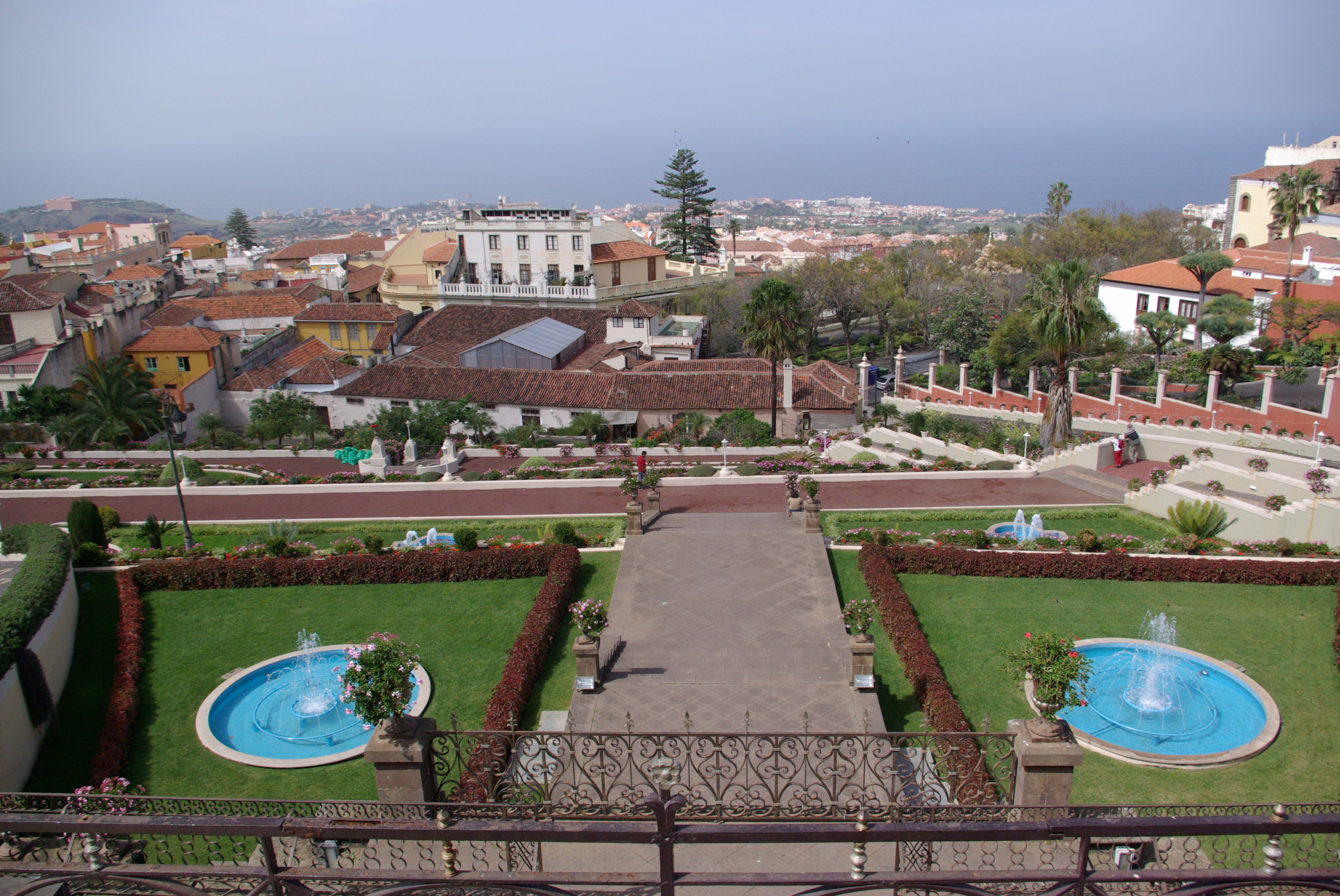
Jardines Marquesado de la Quinta Roja

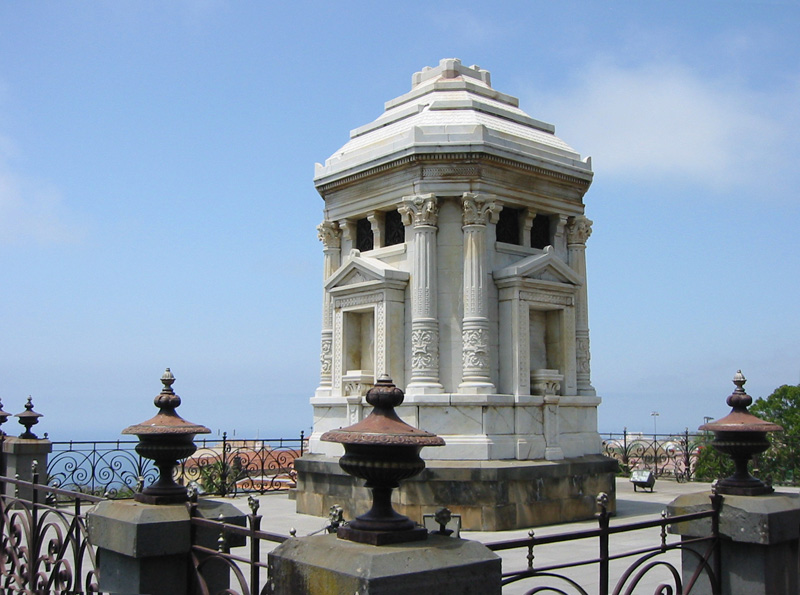
Mausoleum Jardines Marquesado de la Quinta Roja

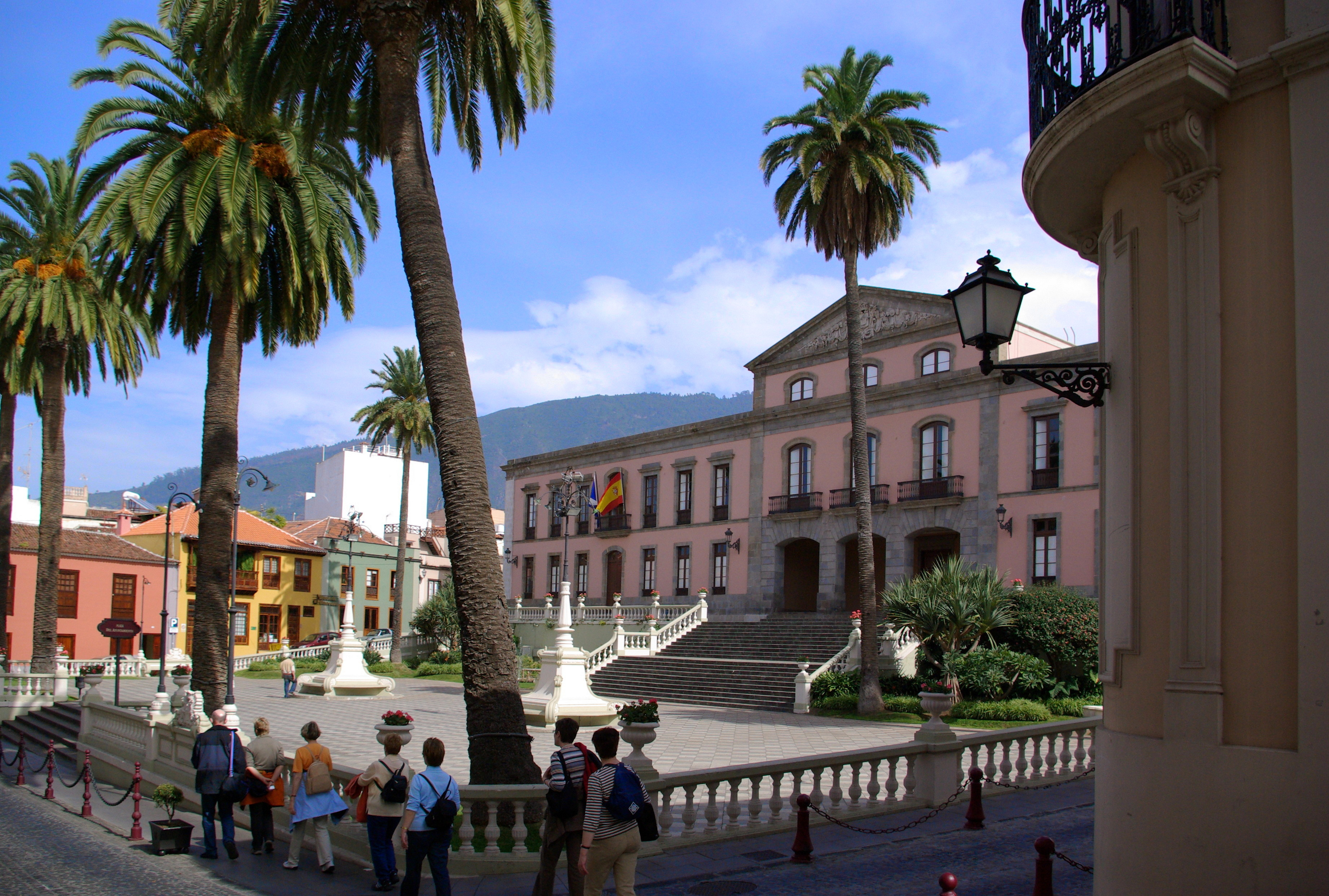
Plaza del Ayuntamiento

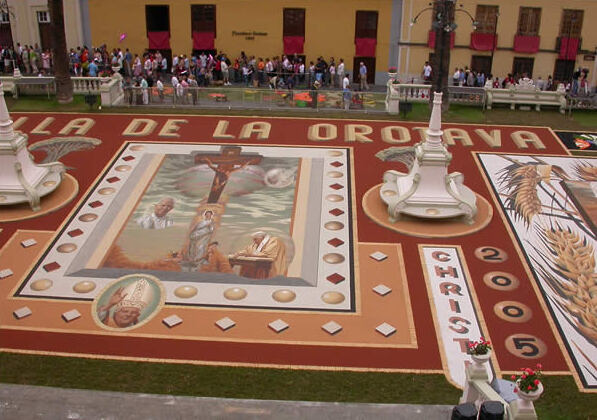
Corpus Christi in La Orotava

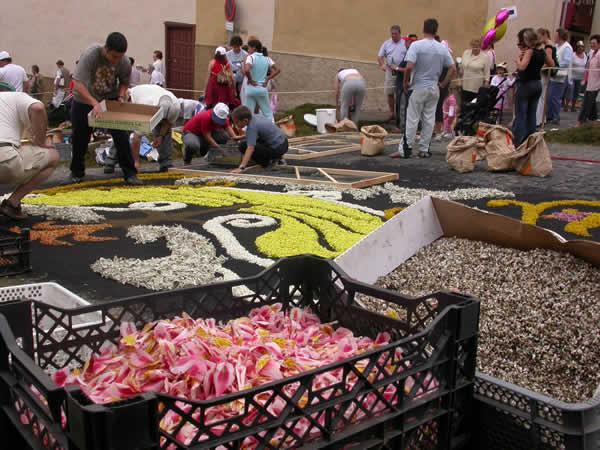
Flower carpets

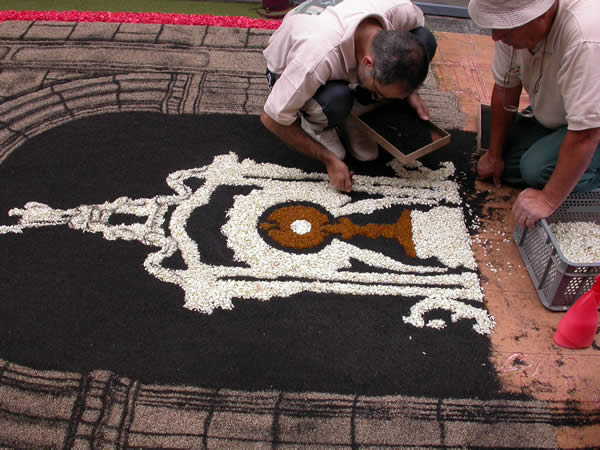
Flower carpets

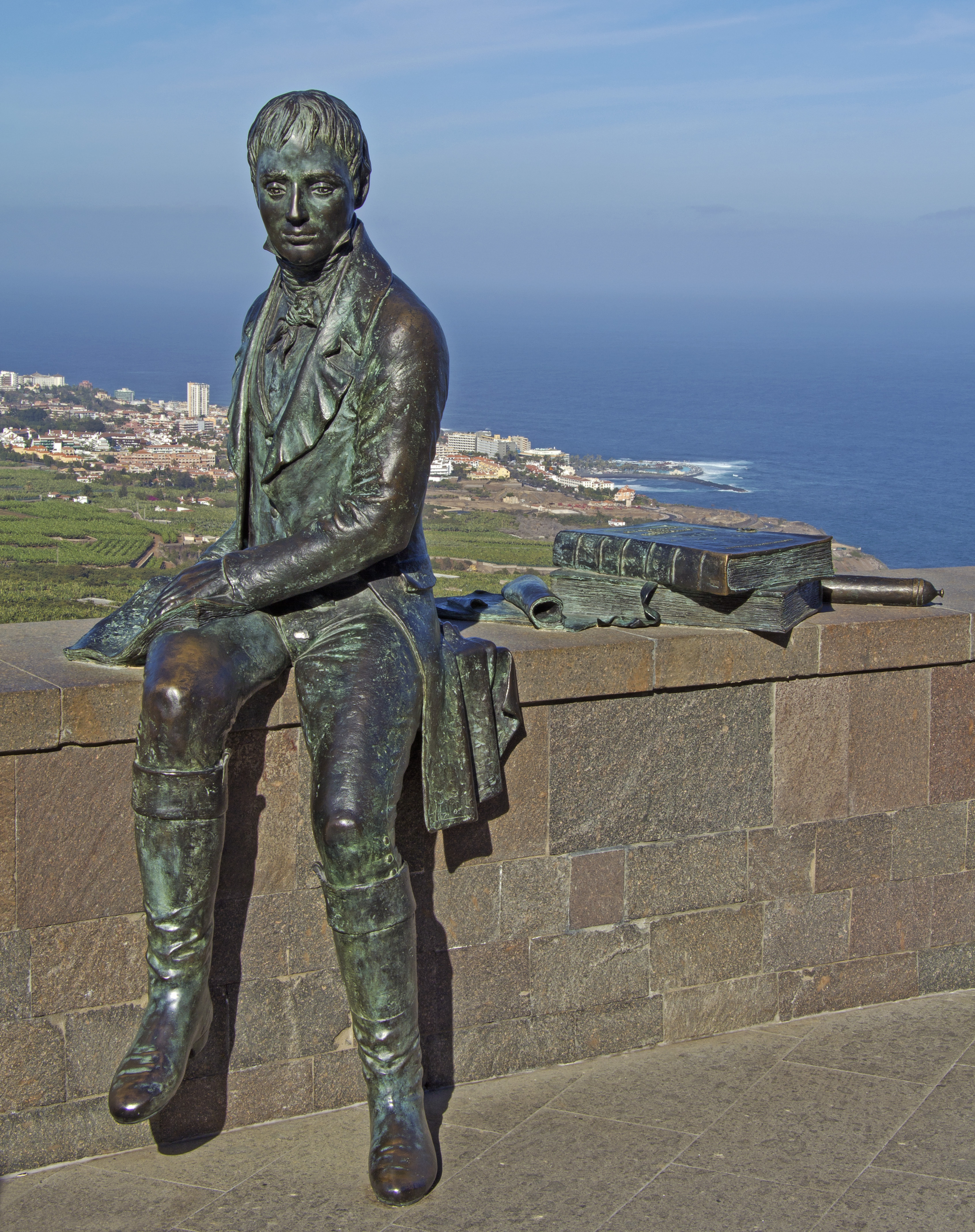
The bronze sculpture by the artist Ana Lilia Martín, born in La Palma (Canarias) in 1963, depicts the natural scientist Alexander von Humboldt. The sculpture has been on the terrace of the Humboldblick viewpoint in La Orotava since 2009

== Persons ==
- Fernando Estévez – sculptor.
- Dr. George V. Perez (1861–1920), Anglo-Spanish Physician who settled in this area and became a renowned local physician and later, a botanist.
- Matías de Escobar y Llamas – friar, speaker and writer.
- Diego Rodríguez Fernández – footballer (CD Tenerife, Real Betis, Sevilla FC, Spain)
- Carlos Benites Franquis de Lugo (1691–?) – governor of Spanish Texas between 1736 and 1737.
- Luis Francisco Benítez de Lugo y Benítez de Lugo (1837–1876) – politician. Freemason and pioneer of Spiritualism in Spain.
- Irene González Hernández (1969–2014), researcher and astrophysicist.

== In literature ==
The English author Christopher Isherwood describes completing his novel Mr Norris Changes Trains in La Orotava in the summer of 1934 in chapter 10 of his autobiography Christopher and His Kind.

The English author Radclyffe Hall in chapter 37, section 3, of her novel "The Well of Loneliness" has her character Stephen Gordon state to her love interest Mary Llewellyn,"I'd like to get you right away for a bit, the weather seems pretty awful in Paris. Puddle once told me about Teneriffe, she went there ages ago with a pupil. She stayed at a place called Orotava; it's lovely, I believe – do you think you'd enjoy it?"

== See also ==
- List of municipalities in Santa Cruz de Tenerife
- Universidad Europea de Canarias
