= Los Realejos =

Town on Tenerife

- Municipality
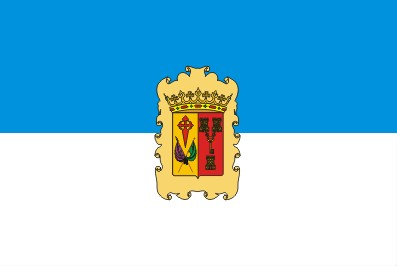
- Flag Coat of arms
- Interactive map of Los Realejos
- Location within Tenerife
- Coordinates: 28°21′N 16°36′W
- Country: Spain
- Autonomous Community: Canary Islands
- Province: Santa Cruz de Tenerife
- Island: Tenerife

Government
  - Mayor: Manuel Domínguez (PP)

Area
  - Total: 57 km^{2} (22 sq mi)
- Elevation (AMSL): 420 m (1,380 ft)

Population (2025-01-01)
  - Total: 37,867
  - Density: 660/km^{2} (1,700/sq mi)
- Time zone: UTC+0 (CET)
  - Summer (DST): UTC+1 (CEST (GMT +1))
- Postal code: 38410\34418
- Area code: +34 (Spain) + 922 (Tenerife)
- Website: www.losrealejos.es

Los Realejos is a town and a municipality in the northern part of the island of Tenerife, which is the biggest town in the Canary Islands. It is part of the province of Santa Cruz de Tenerife, Spain. The town is located 2 km (1.2 mi) from the north coast, 5 km (3.1 mi) southwest of Puerto de la Cruz, 6 km (3.7 mi) west of La Orotava, and 34 km (21 mi) southwest of the island's capital Santa Cruz de Tenerife. The inhabitants are known in Spanish as realejeros.

The latest population count consists of 37,970 (2013), its density being 670/km^{2} (1,700/sq mi) and the area is 57.08 km^{2} (22.04 sq mi). The highest peak is 420 m (1,380 ft). Los Realejos is the western terminus of the TF-5 motorway.

== Background ==
The town is split into two distinct areas or districts:

- Realejo Alto (Upper Realejo)
- Realejo Bajo (Lower Realejo)

These areas are distinct from each other in terms of their geography (a large deep ravine splits both) and their history (during the Spanish conquest of the island, the indigenous people Guanches had a settlement in the lower area of the town. In contrast, the Spaniards occupied the upper area). Furthermore, each area has its own Baroque church, both of which were built shortly after completing the Spanish conquest. The municipality was originally founded and known as Realejo de Arriba.

The town governed by its local council also includes other smaller villages such as Palo Blanco, Cruz Santa, Mocan, Icod de Alto, and Tigaiga. Over the years, an increase in population and housing have merged into what appears to be one big town nowadays.

Los Realejos also has a few beaches of note, Playa de El Socorro being the most popular one, not only with the locals but also with tourists. Other beaches like Playa de Castro and Playa de Fajana are worthy of mention, albeit they are slightly less accessible than El Socorro. Los Realejos is the home of the English language newspaper the Tenerife News. Los Realejos boasts the Shrine of Our Lady of Mount Carmel, which is the main Marian shrine in northern Tenerife.

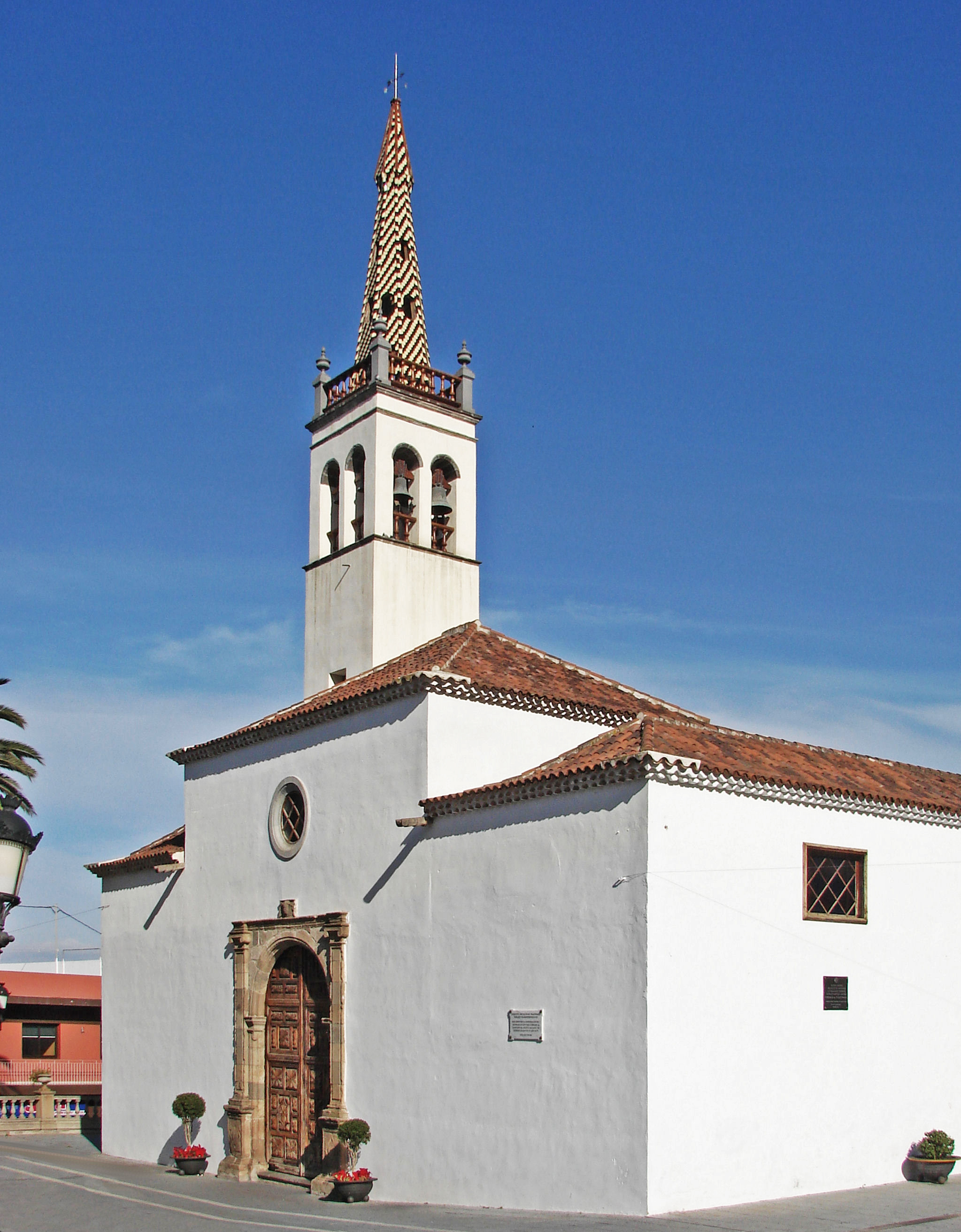
Church of St James, Los Realejos

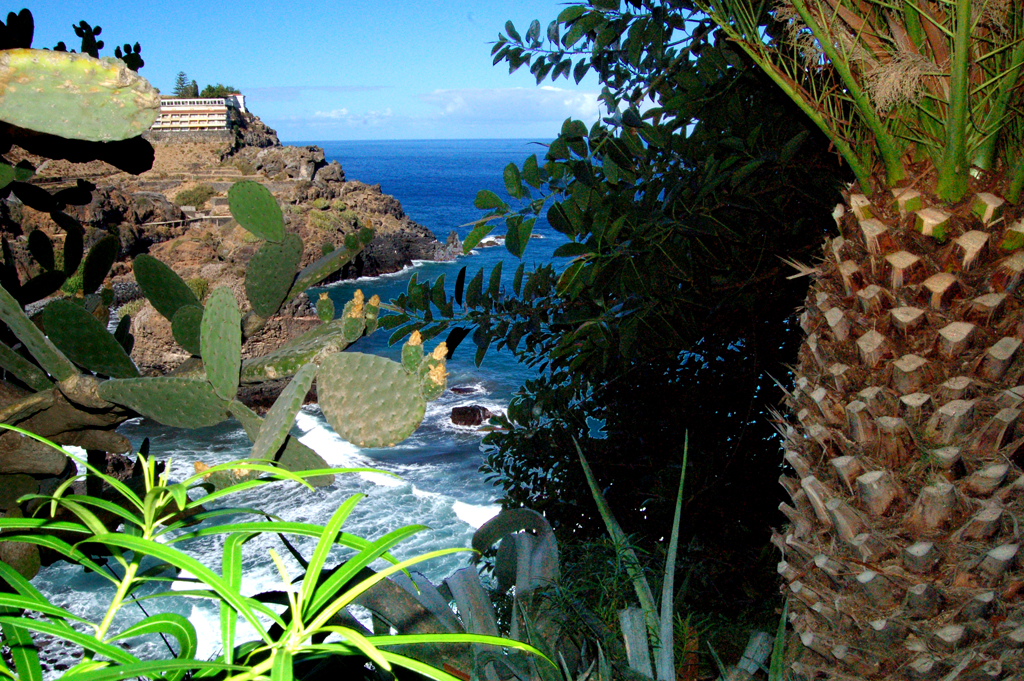

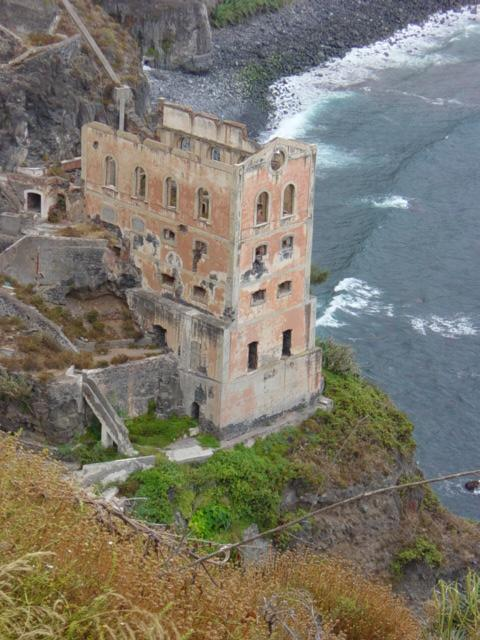
Water elevator

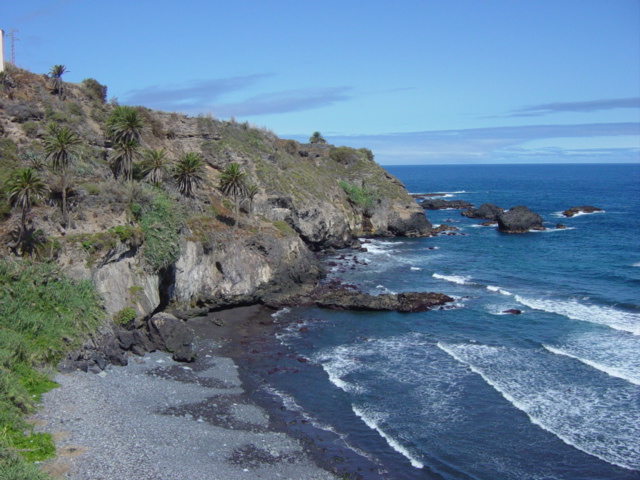
Playa de Castro

== Historical population ==
Year	Population
1991	29,829
1996	32,599
2001	33,438
2002	35,299
2003	35,799
2004	35,756
2009	37,559
2013	37,970
2014	36,860
2015	36,276
2016	36,149
2017	36,218
2018	36,405
2019	36,402

== Education ==
The British School of Tenerife has its Trinity Campus in Los Realejos.

== Natives of Los Realejos ==
- José Viera y Clavijo (December 28, 1731, Las Palmas de Gran Canaria - February 21, 1813), a writer, botanist, and a historian.

== See also ==
- List of municipalities in Santa Cruz de Tenerife
- Mother Parish of the Apostle Santiago
