= Church of St James, Los Realejos =

Roman Catholic minor basilica in the Canary Islands

- Parroquia Matriz del Apóstol Santiago
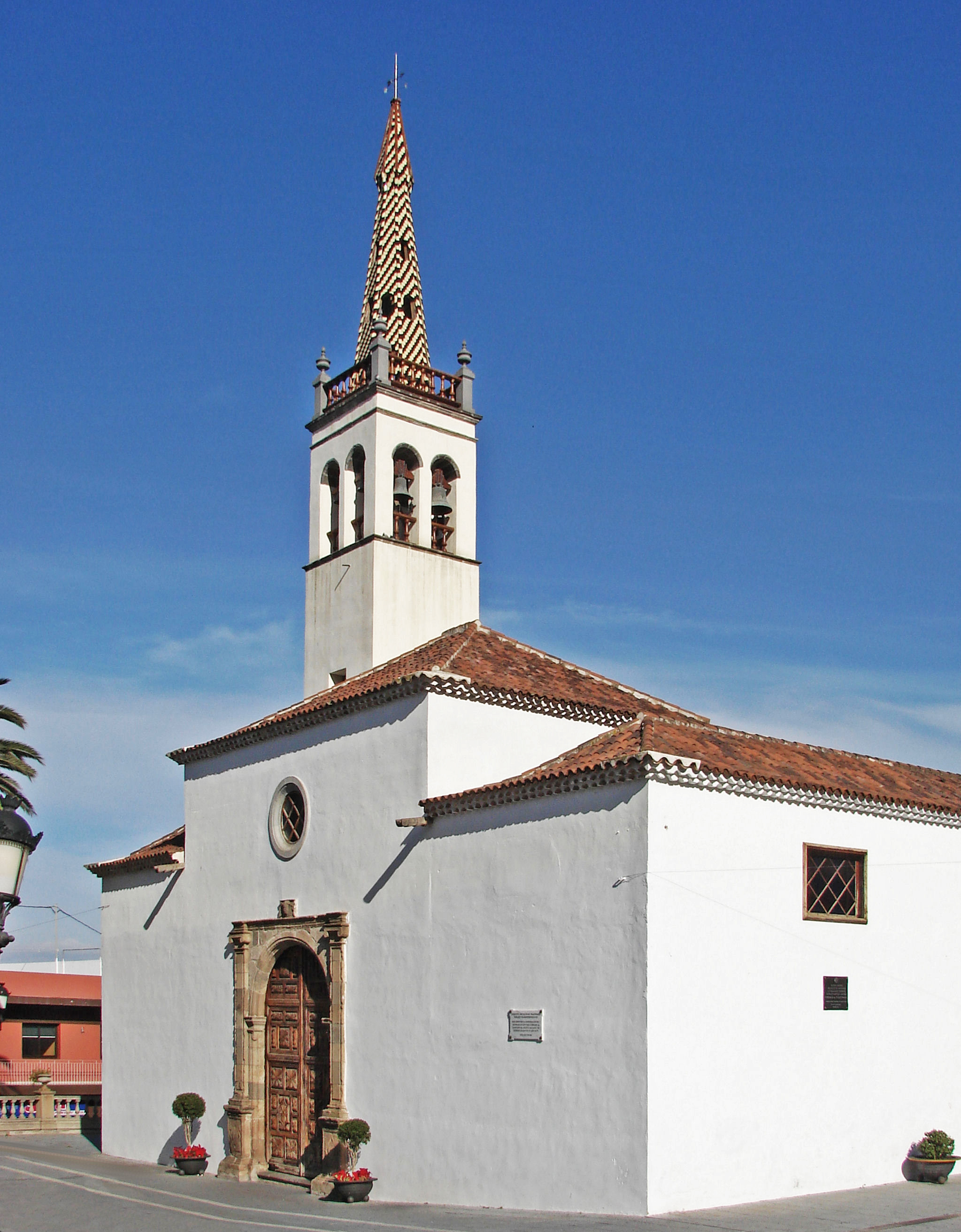
- Church of St James, Los Realejos

Religion
- Affiliation: Roman Catholic
- Province: Diocese of San Cristóbal de La Laguna
- Ecclesiastical or organizational status: Parish

Location
- Location: Los Realejos, Spain
- Interactive map of Church of St James, Los Realejos
- Coordinates: 28.380833°N 16.585°W

Architecture
- Groundbreaking: 1496

The Church of St James (Spanish: Parroquia Matriz del Apóstol Santiago) is a Roman Catholic parish church located in the town of Los Realejos, Tenerife, Spain. Founded in 1496, it was declared a national monument of Spain by Royal decree of Spain 598 (February 2, 1983) (B.O.E. N.º 69). It is dedicated to Saint James the Great, the patron saint of Spain.

== Background ==
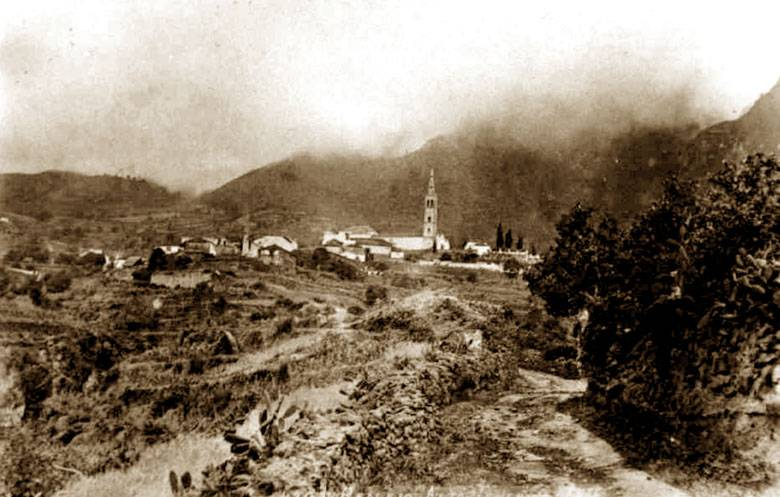
The Realejo de Arriba in the 19th century

Founded in 1496, the church was one of the first religious buildings in Tenerife after the military stage of the Reconquista had ended. After the Conquest of the Canary Islands, Alonso Fernández de Lugo decided to build a shrine to Saint James the Apostle as a token of gratitude. Also, as seen by their heraldry, towns like Gáldar on the islands already had an affinity for Saint James.

On July 25, 1496, on the Feast of Saint James, nine Gaunche kings were baptized. Among them were Adjona, Añaterve, and Beneharo. The church is mentioned in the 1542 writings of bishop Diego de Muros who mentions the donations of lands to the church of "...Santiago del Realejo de arriba" becoming for the benefit of the Taoro region.

Records from the period no longer exist, but it is believed that in 1496, a simple structure covered with a straw roof was erected, making it the first Christian church on Tenerife. The current door on the north face of the church dates to 1570. Carved by Juan Benítez, it is referred to as the "Jacobean doorway."

An inventory of the church from 1591 lists three main altars. The largest held a primitive image of the Apostle James as a pilgrim; the second was of Bartholomew the Apostle, Benedict of Nursia and Anthony of Padua. There was also one for Our Lady of Los Remedios. Also listed were paintings of Saint Sebastian and Saint Michael. Along with the paintings were numerous pieces of gold and silverware. The inventory also describes a wooden choir, organ and pulpit.

== History ==
The construction of the temple as it stands today since the 17th century. Since the 16th-century building was in a dilapidated state at the beginning of that century, in 1604 the same master who had made the first stonework doorway in 1570, was commissioned to dismantle what became known as the "Old church" and build the new one. The design expanded the single nave and opened the chapels on both sides of the transept. Some of the materials from the main chapel were used with new stone would brought from the quarries of Tigaiga.

In 1610 the "nave del Evangelio" (English: nave of the Gospel) was completed on the north side of the church, presided over by Our Lady of the Rosary in her own chapel. What was once the main door to the nave became the entrance to this chapel.

The south side of the "nave de la Epístola" (English: nave of the Epistle) was completed in 1626. Manuel Penedo, a Portuguese stonemason, demolished the corresponding exterior wall and built the new nave with stone from the quarries of Acentejo. With the rebuilding of the chancel in 1667, all remnants of the old church had disappeared.

The roof was made with wood from Tigaiga, accentuation the importance of the main nave. It was designed with a cross frame divided into eight frames and covered with coffers, and an elongated harness from which two pendants hang. The gold and polychrome used to decorate it were the work of the master Andrés Gómez. The roofs of the side chapels were designed similar to the nave, but with greater simplicity. The church tower situated on the left façade was built in 1774, replacing the original. The tower's spire is covered in mujedar syle ceramic tile.

At the end of the 18th century, what is now the current configuration was completed. It shares the same design characteristics as other churches in the Canary Islands: three naves of equal height, topped by separate roofs, and covered by traditional mujedar art.

The statues of Our Lady of Remedies (Los Realejos), by sculptor Fernando Estévez, and El Nazareno (Los Realejos) by Martín de Andújar Cantos are on display in the church.

In 1922, because of deterioration, all the stonework in the arches and columns was replaced with new concrete ones featuring ionic capitals. In the 1960s the nave was expanded and two new side chapels were added.

== See also ==
- Historical information on parish priests
- Fiestas de la Cruz
- Sebastián Fernández Méndez
- Treaty of Los Realejos
