= Sebastián Fernández Méndez =

Spanish sculptor

Sebastián Fernández Méndez (1700, San Cristóbal de La Laguna - after 1774) was a Spanish sculptor of the 18th century from Tenerife. He is considered one of the island's most noted sculptors.
