= Torday =

Torday is a surname. Notable people with the surname include:

- Daniel Torday, American writer
- Emeric Tauss Torday, Hungarian painte
- Emil Torday (1875–1931), Hungarian anthropologist
- Paul Torday (1946–2013), British writer
- Piers Torday (born 1974), British writer, son of Paul
- Terry Torday, Hungarian actress
- Ursula Torday (1912–1997), English writer

== See also ==
- Tordai
