= Tordai =

Tordai is a surname. Notable people with the surname include:

- Árpád Tordai (born 1997), Romanian footballer
- Bence Tordai (born 1981), Hungarian politician, economist, and sociologist
- Oszkar Tordai Schilling, Hungarian artist
- Teri Tordai (born 1941), Hungarian actress

== See also ==
- Torday
