= Gerardo Diego =

Spanish poet (1896–1987)

The Most Excellent Gerardo Diego
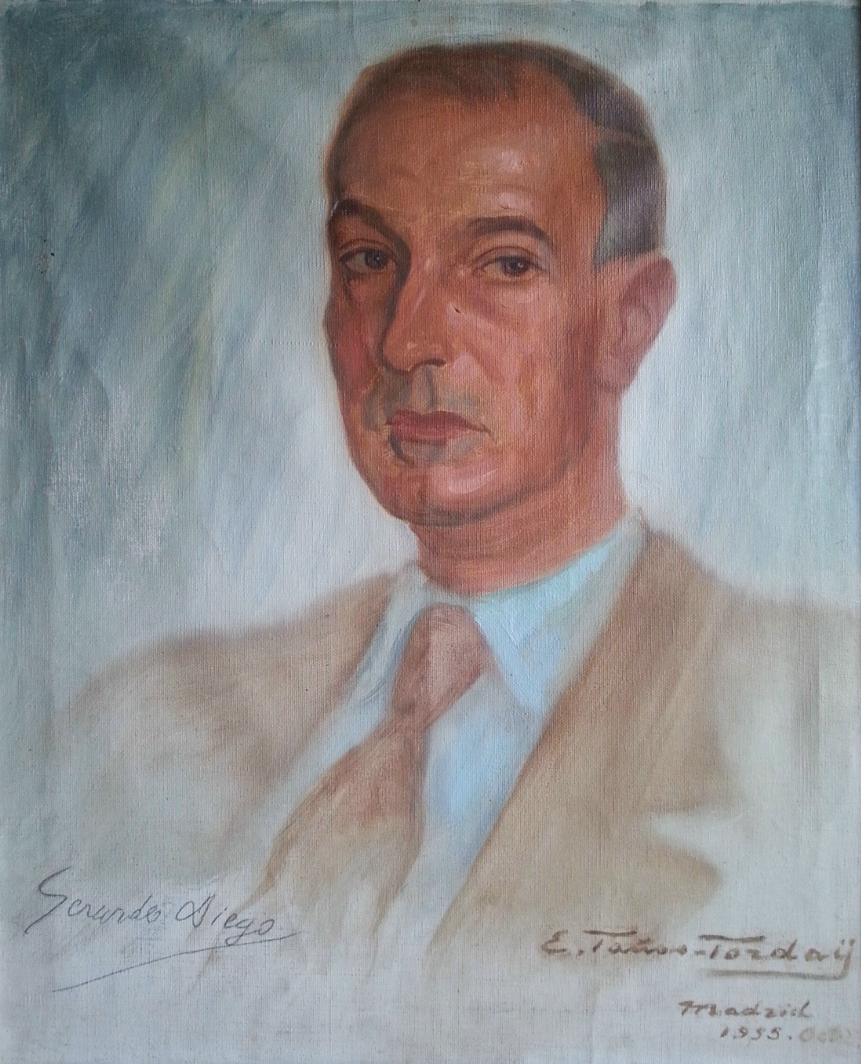
- Portrait by Emeric Tauss Torday
- Born: Gerardo Diego Cendoya; 3 October 1896; Santander, Spain
- Died: 8 July 1987 (aged 90); Madrid, Spain

Seat I of the Real Academia Española
- In office 15 February 1948 – 8 July 1987
- Preceded by: Blas Cabrera
- Succeeded by: Claudio Rodríguez

Gerardo Diego Cendoya (October 3, 1896 – July 8, 1987) was a Spanish poet, a member of the Generation of '27.

Diego taught language and literature at institutes of learning in Soria, Gijón, Santander and Madrid. He also acted as literary and music critic for several newspapers.

== Biography ==
Diego was born in Santander. He studied the subjects of Philosophy & Humanities at the University of Deusto, and later at the universities of Salamanca and Madrid, where he earned his doctorate. With Juan Larrea, he founded the Ultraísta Movement in 1919. He was professor of literature and music. He began his poetic work with El romancero de la novia (1920).

After discovering the Chilean poet Vicente Huidobro, founder of the Creationist movement, Diego became one of the most enthusiastic followers of Creacionismo. The extensive poetic work of Diego has always varied between the themes and expressions of Vanguardism and the more classical structures of poetry. In 1925, he was awarded the National Prize for Literature for his book Versos humanos. He began to publish the journal Carmen y Lola, of Vanguardist character, in 1927. In 1932 he published Poesía española contemporánea.

Diego was elected to seat I of the Real Academia Española, he took up his seat on 15 February 1948. His lifetime accomplishment was recognised with the Cervantes Prize in 1979.

He died in Madrid, in 1987, aged 90.

== Works ==
- Obras Completas, Edited by Francisco Javier Díez de Revenga y José Luis Bernal, Madrid: Alfaguara, 1997-2001, 9 vols.

=== Poetry ===
- El romancero de la novia, Santander, Imp. J. Pérez, 1920.
- Imagen. Poemas (1918–1921), M., Gráfica de Ambos Mundos, 1922.
- Soria. Galería de estampas y efusiones, Valladolid, Libros para amigos, 1923.
- Manual de espumas, M., Cuadernos Literarios (La Lectura), 1924.
- Versos humanos, M., Renacimiento, 1925.
- Viacrucis, Santander, Talleres Aldus, 1931.
- Fábula de Equis y Zeda, México, Alcancía, 1932.
- Poemas adrede, México, Alcancía, 1932.
- Ángeles de Compostela, M., Patria, 1940.
- Alondra de verdad, M., Escorial, 1941.
- Primera antología de sus versos, M., Espasa-Calpe, 1941.
- Romances (1918–1941), M., Patria, 1941.
- Poemas adrede, M., Col. Adonais, 1943 (Edición completa).
- La sorpresa, M., CSIC, 1944.
- Hasta siempre, M., Mensajes, 1948.
- La luna en el desierto, Santander, Vda F. Fons, 1949.
- Limbo, Las Palmas de Gran Canaria, El Arca, 1951.
- Visitación de Gabriel Miró, Alicante, 1951.
- Dos poemas (Versos divinos), Melilla, 1952.
- Biografía incompleta, M., Cultura Hispánica, 1953
- Segundo sueño (Homenaje a Sor Juana Inés de la Cruz), Santander, Col. Tito Hombre, 1953 (Xilografías de Joaquín de la Puente).
- Variación, M., Neblí, 1954.
- Amazona, M., Ágora, 1956.
- Égloga a Antonio Bienvenida, Santander, Ateneo, 1956.
- Paisaje con figuras, Palma de Mallorca, Papeles de Sons Armadans, 1956
- Amor solo, M., Espasa-Calpe, 1958
- Canciones a Violante, M., Punta Europa, 1959.
- Glosa a Villamediana, M., Palabra y Tiempo, 1961.
- La rama, Santander, La isla de los ratones, 1961.
- Mi Santander, mi cuna, mi palabra, Santander, Diputación, 1961.
- Sonetos a Violante, Sevilla, La Muestra, 1962.
- La suerte o la muerte. Poema del toreo, M., Taurus, 1963.
- Nocturnos de Chopin, M., Bullón, 1963.
- El jándalo (Sevilla y Cádiz), M., Taurus, 1964.
- Poesía amorosa 1918–1961, B., Plaza y Janés, 1965.
- El Cordobés dilucidado y vuelta del peregrino, M., Revista de Occidente, 1966.
- Odas morales, Málaga, Librería Anticuaria El Guadalhorce, 1966.
- Variación 2, Santander, Clásicos de Todos los Años, 1966.
- Segunda antología de sus versos (1941–1967), M., Espasa-Calpe, 1967.
- La fundación del querer, Santander, La isla de los ratones, 1970.
- Versos divinos, M., Alforjas para la poesía española (Fundación Conrado Blanco), 1971.
- Cementerio civil, B., Plaza y Janés, 1972.
- Carmen jubilar, Salamanca, Álamo, 1975.
- Cometa errante, B., Plaza y Janés, 1985.

=== Drama ===
- El cerezo y la palmera. Madrid: Alfil, 1964.

== See also ==
- Café Gijón (Madrid)
