= Emeric Tauss Torday =

Hungarian painter

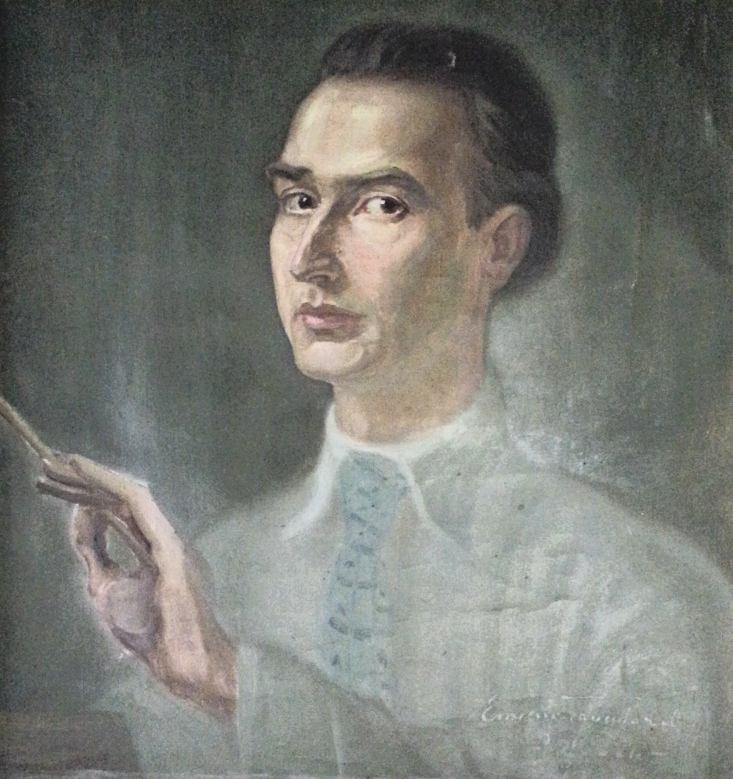
- Self-portrait
- Born: Tausz "Torday" Imre; 7 April 1897; Budapest, Austro-Hungarian Empire
- Died: 27 January 1987 (aged 89); París, France
- Known for: Painting

Emeric Tauss Torday (7 April 1897 – 27 January 1987) was a Hungarian painter trained in Budapest, Prague and Paris known for a number of paintings on display in museums both in Hungary and abroad.

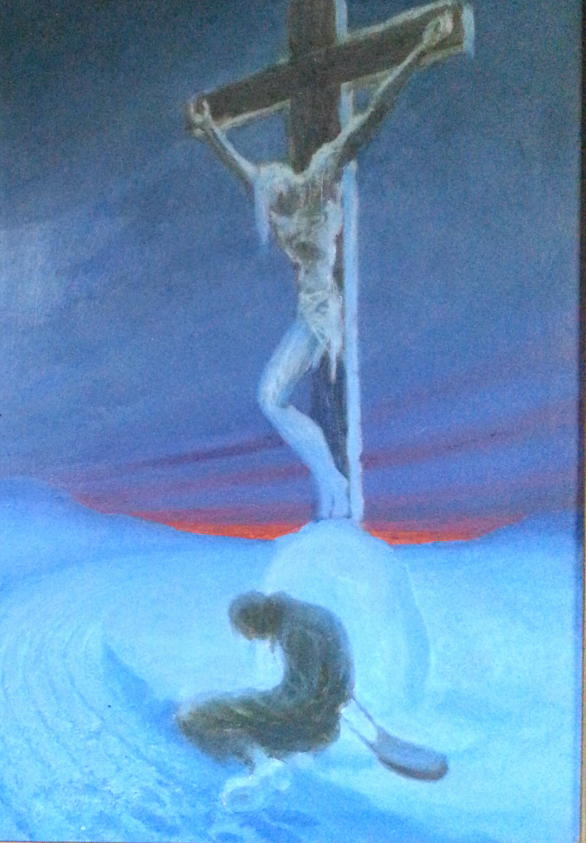
The last refuge

== History ==
Emeric Tauss Torday was born in Budapest. As an artist he was a disciple of the well-known Hungarian painter Fulop Laszlo. At the age of 17 he was awarded the Gold Medal of Artistic Merit in Budapest, which was bestowed upon him by the famous Spanish painter Ignacio Zuloaga.

In addition to being an eminent portraitist and landscape artist, Torday was an adjunct professor at The Sorbonne in Paris. He appears in the dictionary Le Benezit (Dictionnaire des peintres, sculpteurs, dessinateurs et graveurs), a directory of artists with works displayed in international museums.

Torday lived in Paris from 1934 until his death in 1987. In 1955 he travelled to Spain and painted a number of landscapes and portraits of notables such as Menendez Pidal and Gerardo Diego.

In 1946 Torday was part of an exposition of Hungarian painters organized by Jean Cassou, director of the Museum of Modern Art in Paris. One of Torday’s works that appears in this museum, titled L´homme au violon, was valued at that time at 1000 francs. The painting was a sold at auction on March 3, 1999 in Paris.

== Salons and galleries showing Torday´s work ==
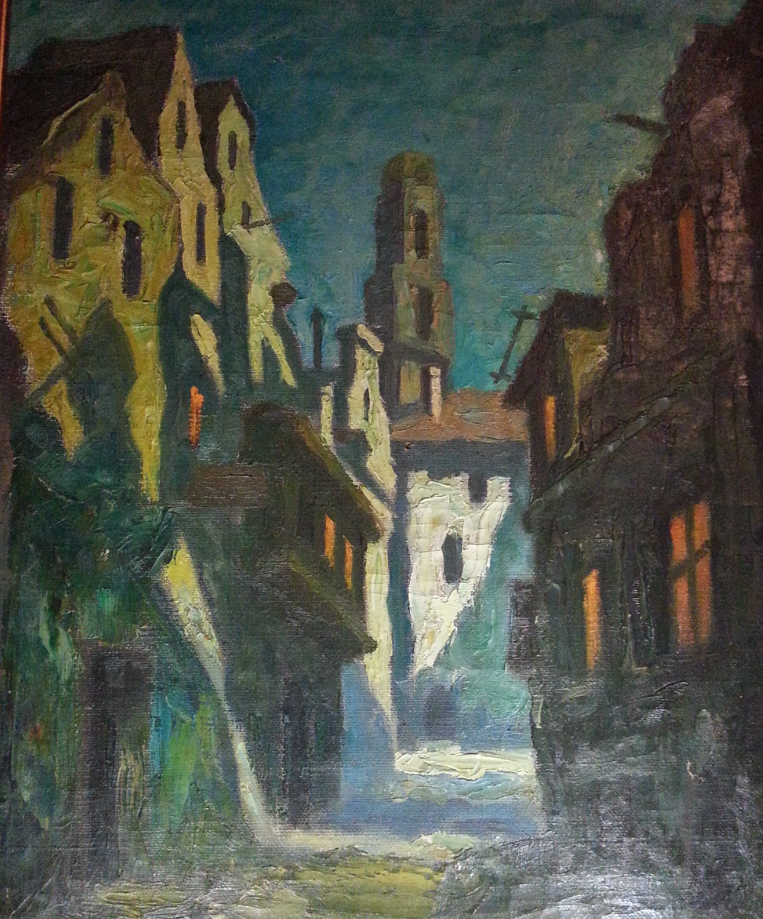
Sunset

- National Salon of Paris
- Salon d'Automne
- Galerie Attica des Beaux-Arts (Paris)
- Hungarian Embassy
- State Museum of France
- Déri Museum (Debrecen, Hungary)

== Portraits ==
- M. Ollivier, granddaughter of celebrated Hungarian composer Franz Liszt
- Jan Wils, architect of the Amsterdam Olympic Stadium
- General Maurin, former French Minister of War
- Count Karolyi, ex-president of the Hungarian Republic and Hungarian Ambassador to France, as well as his wife Countess Judith Karolyi
- Cesar Rodríguez and Ramon Areces, founders of El Corte Ingles

== Gallery ==
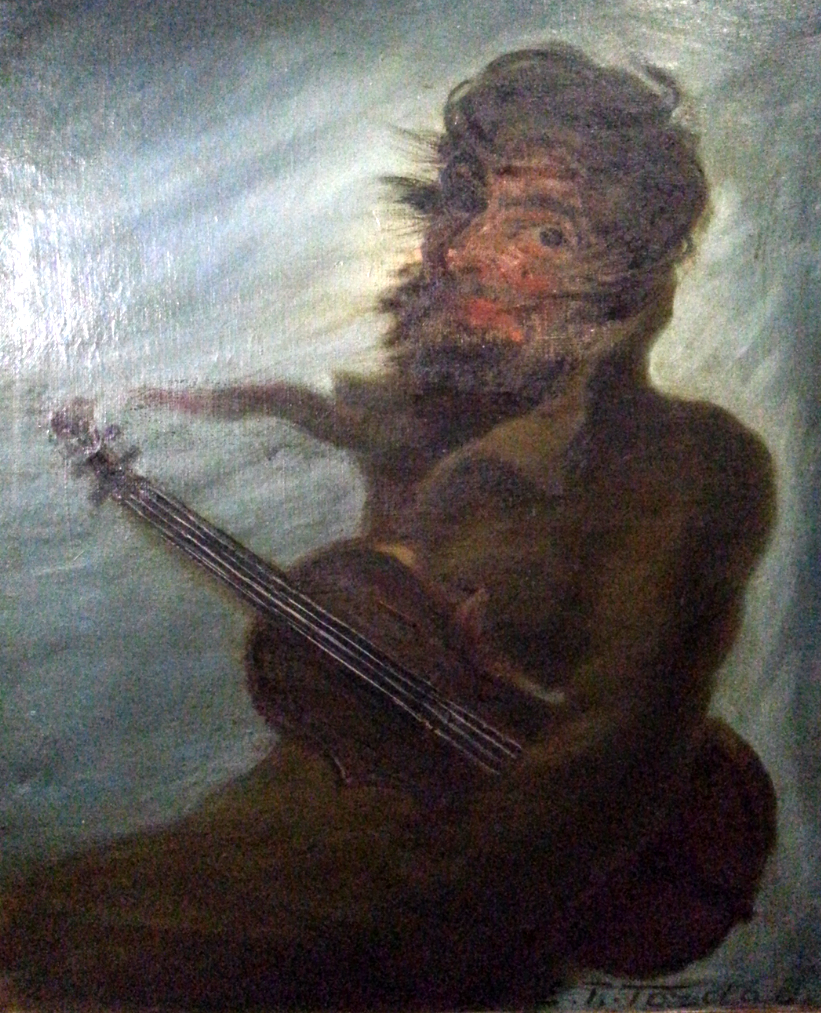
L`homme au violon

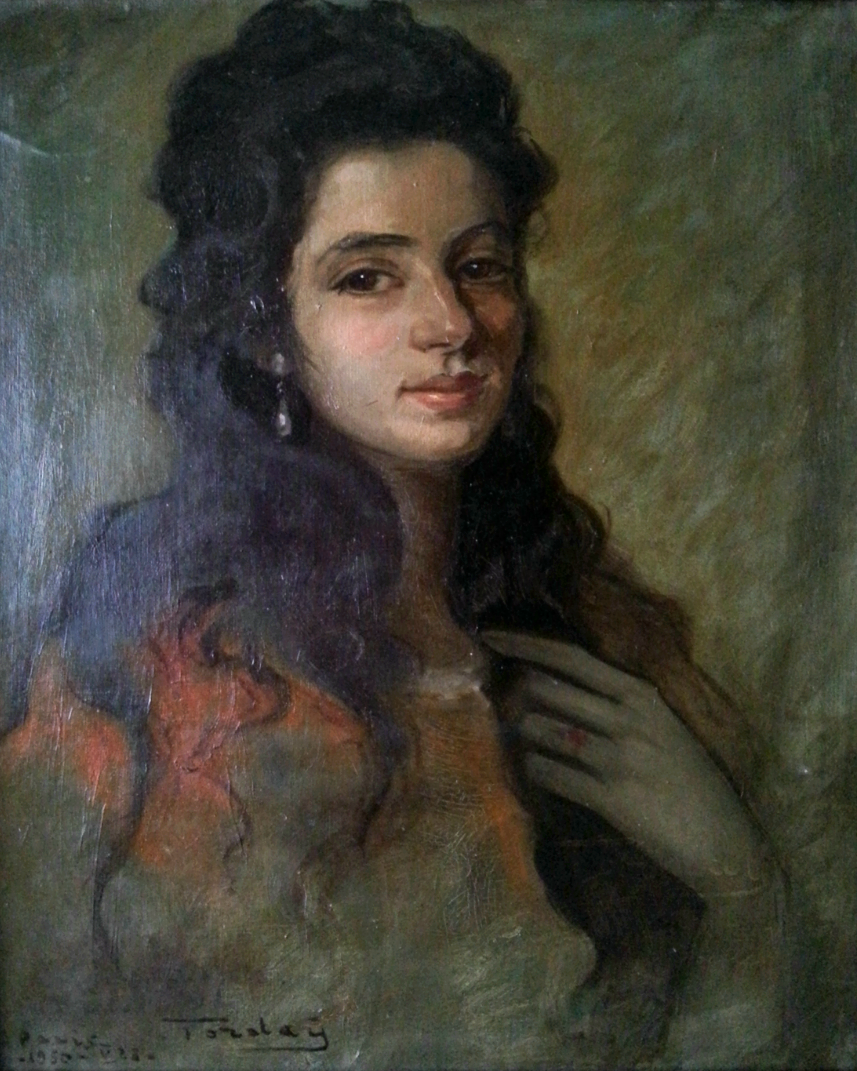
Jeune fille (1950)

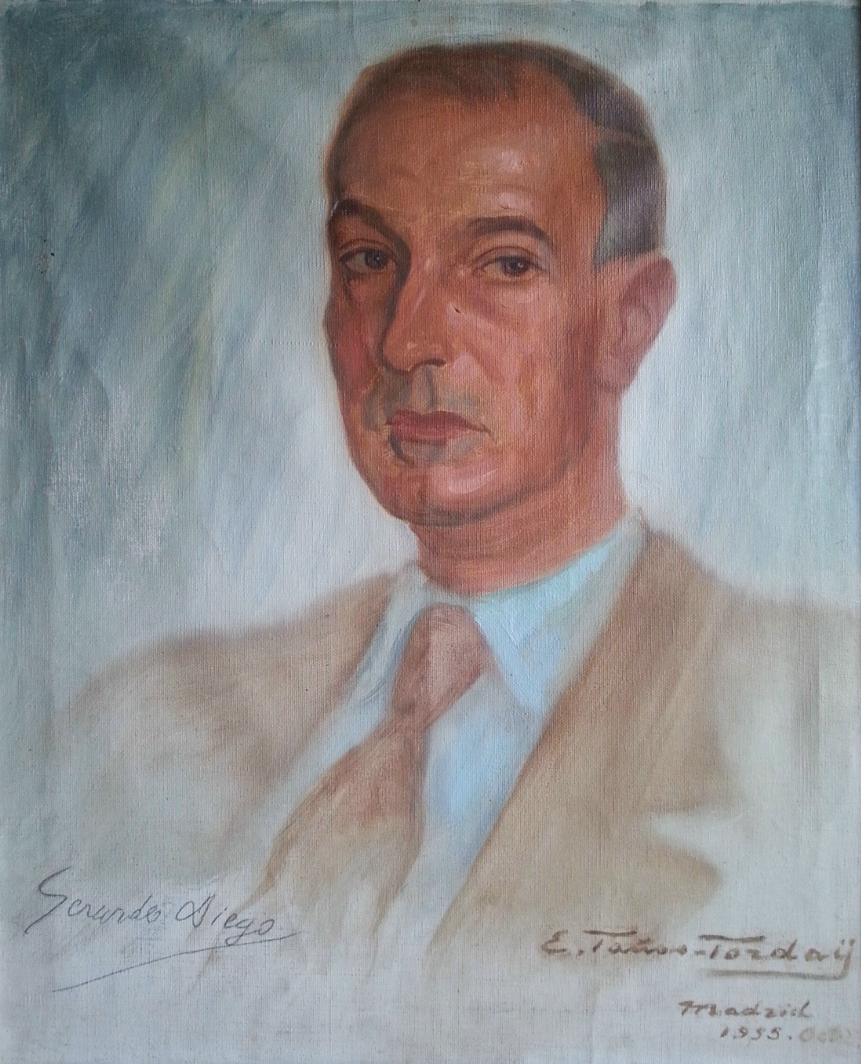
Gerardo Diego (1955)

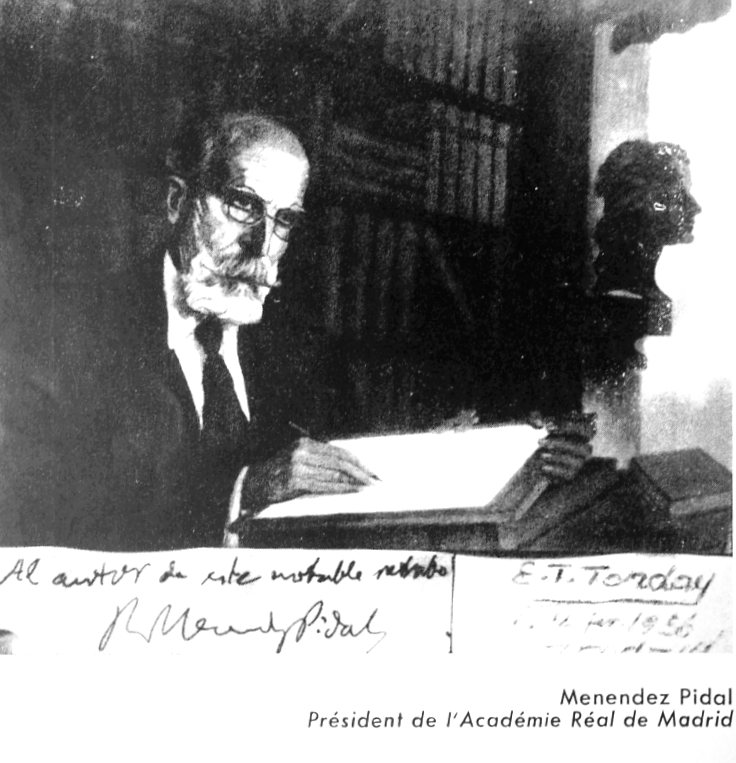
Menéndez Pidal (1955)

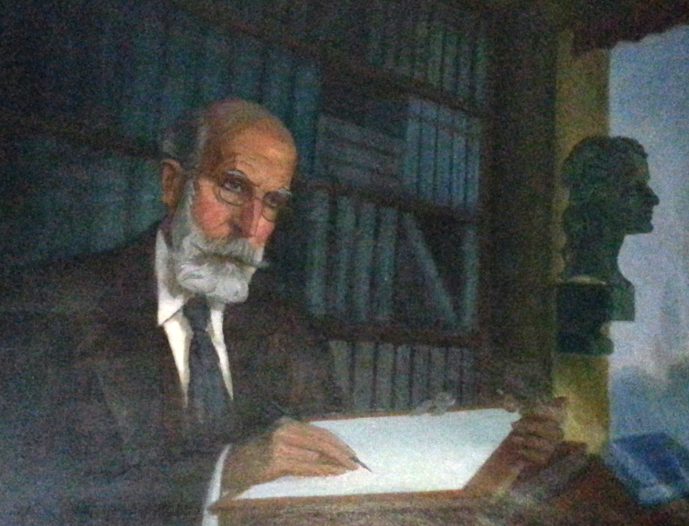
Menéndez Pidal (1955)

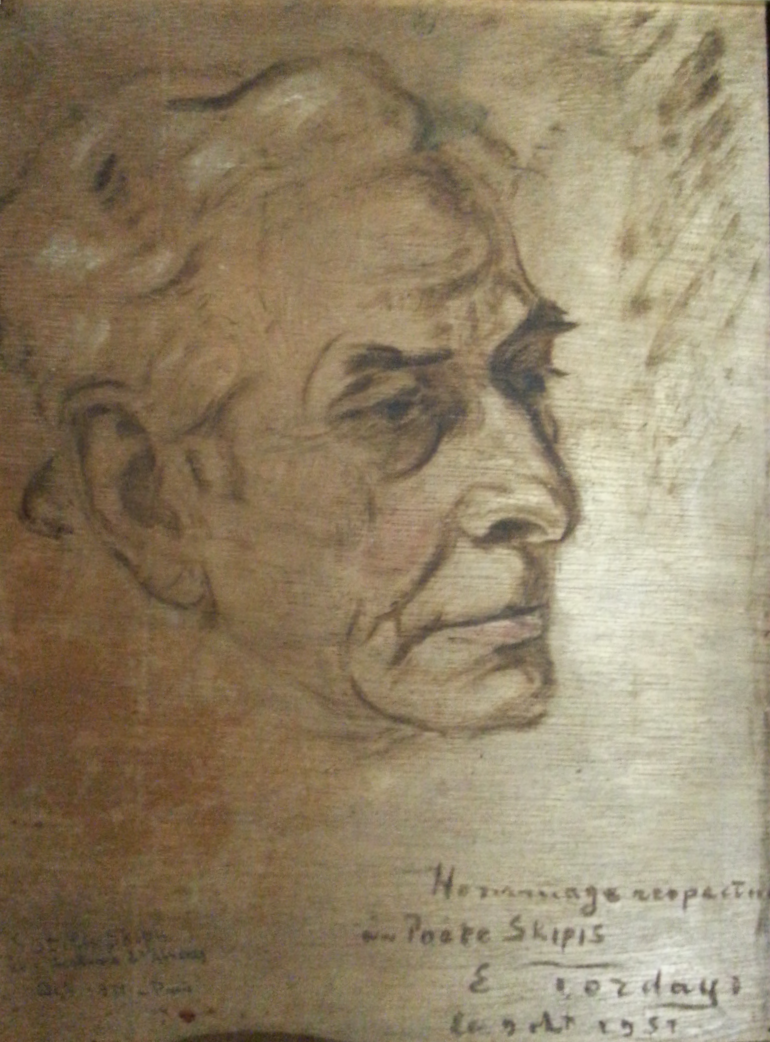
Sotíris Skípis

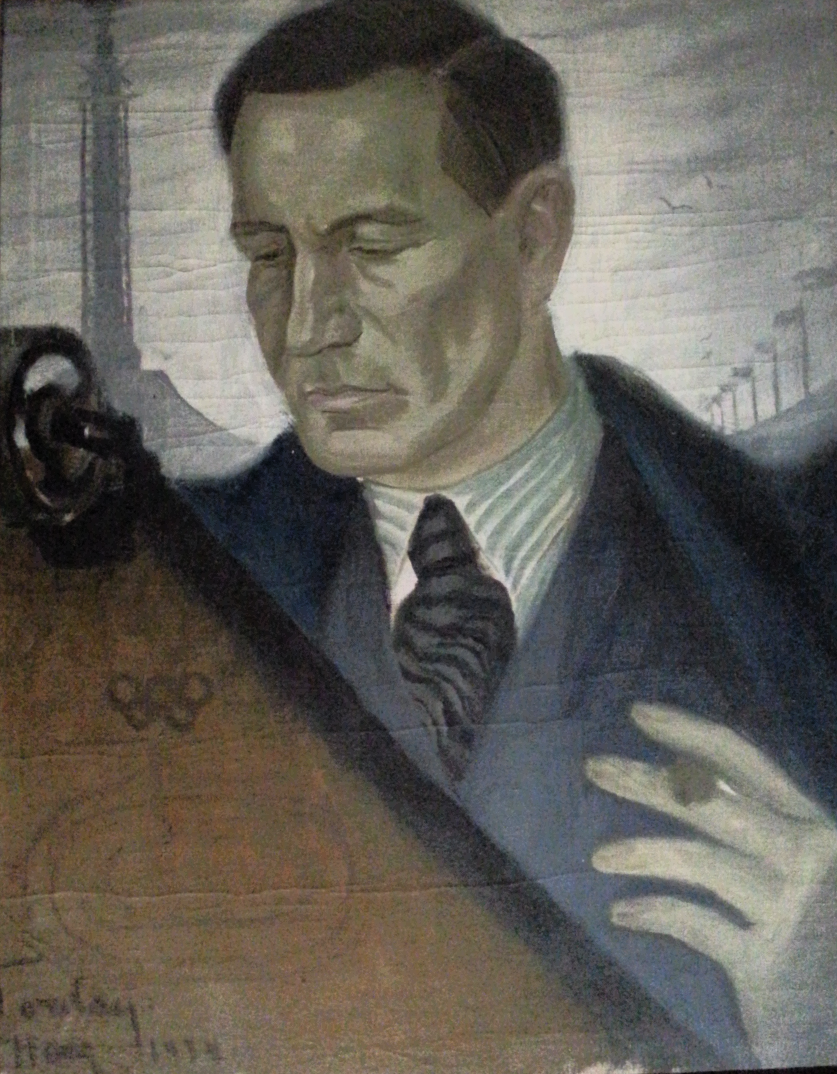
Jan Wils

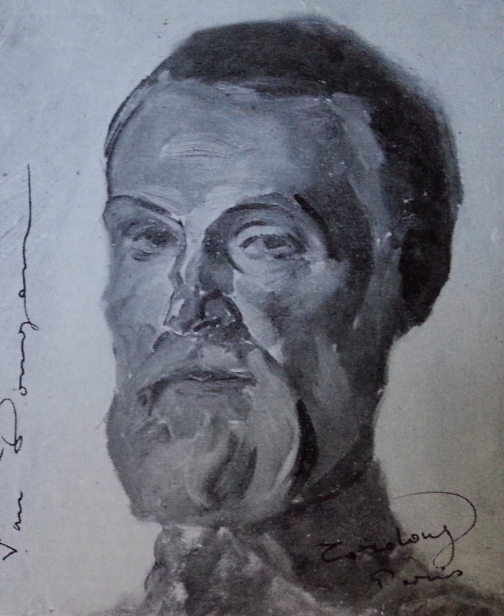
Kees van Dongen

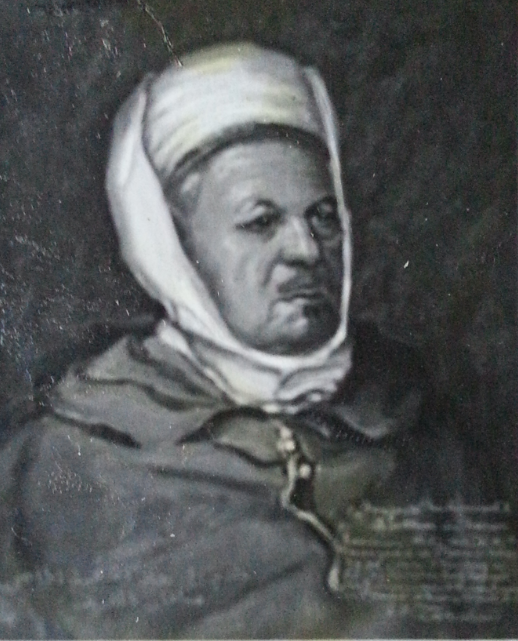

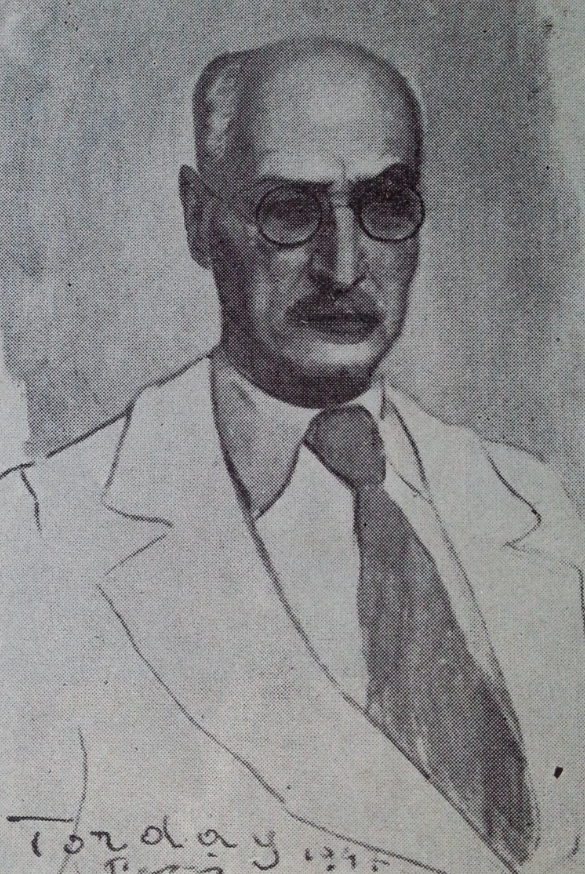
Count Károlyi

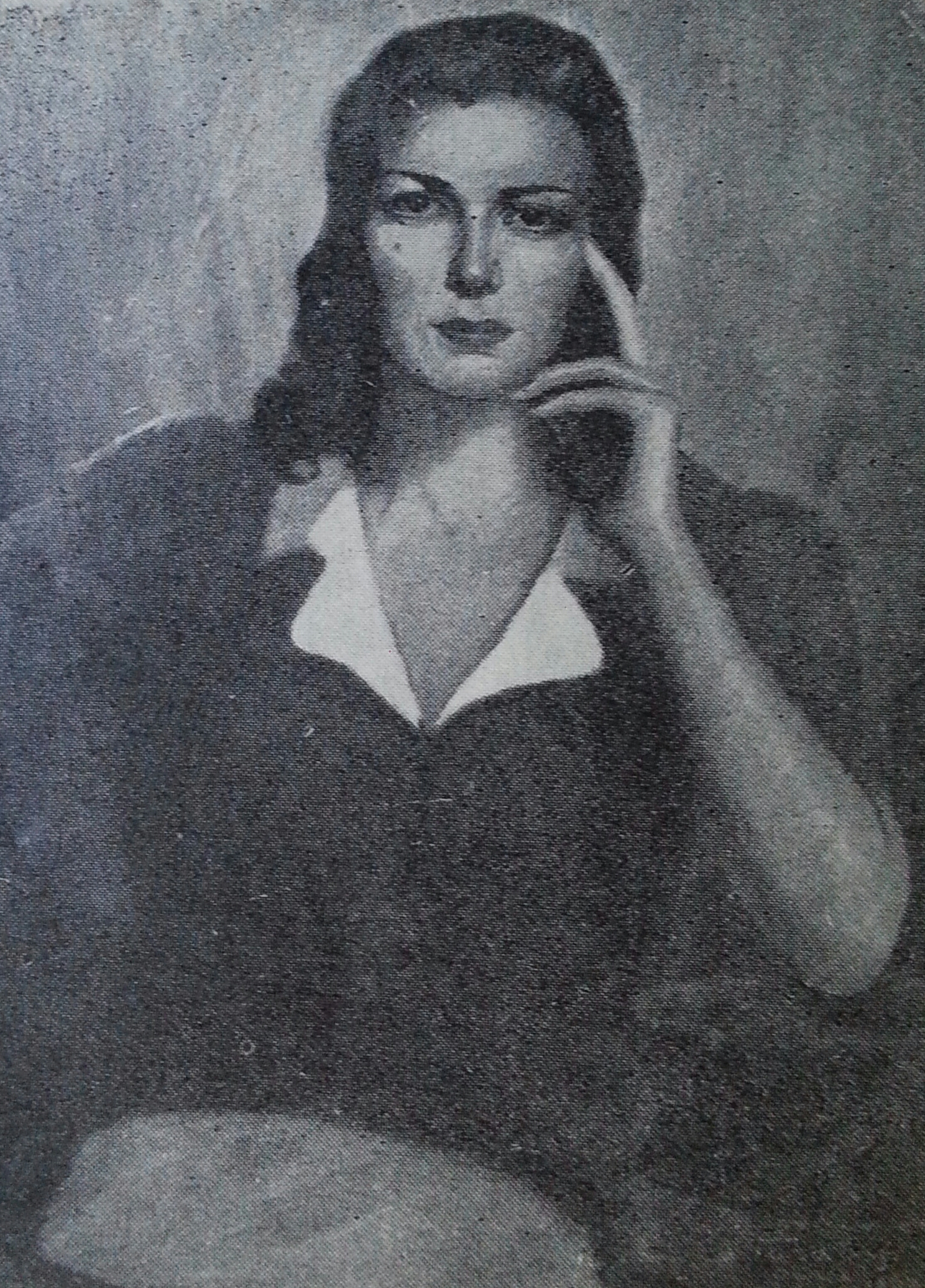
Countess Judith Károlyi

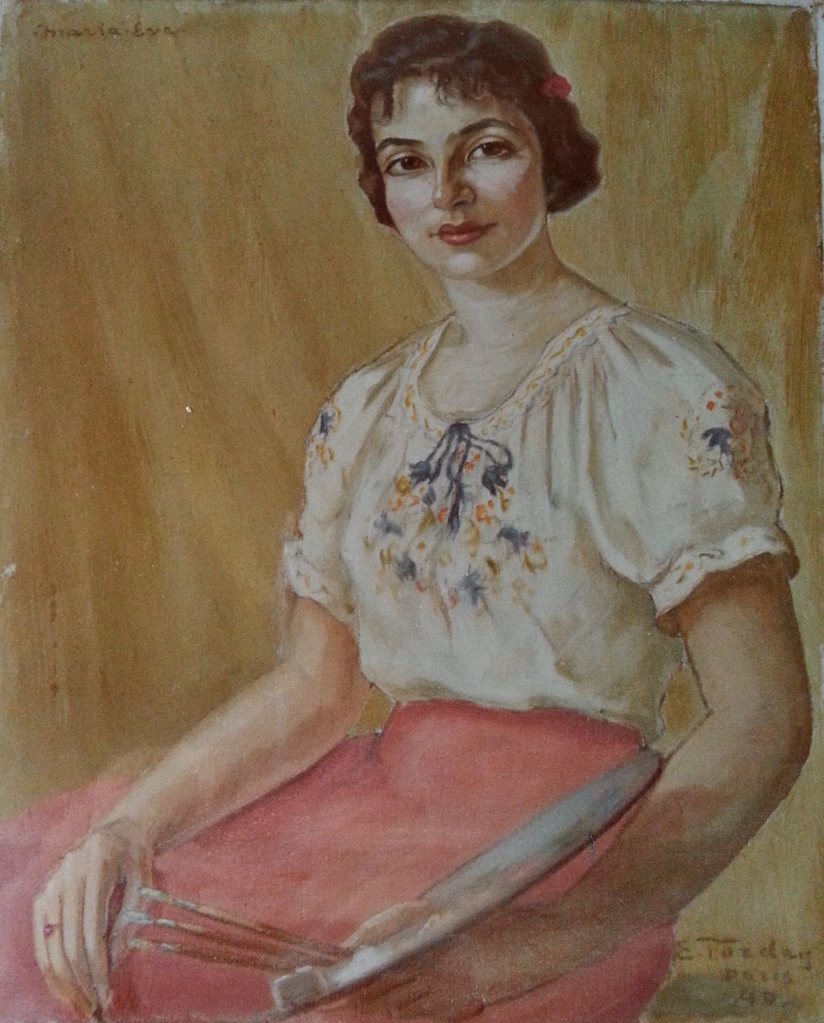
Young

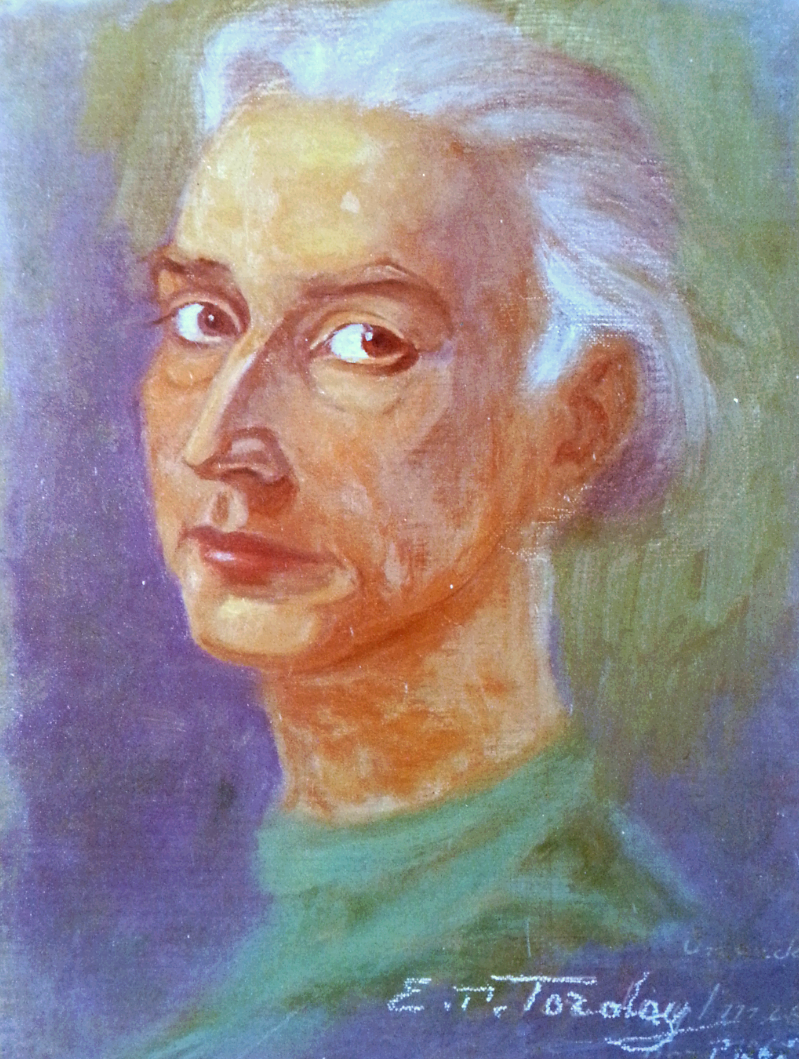
Self-portrait

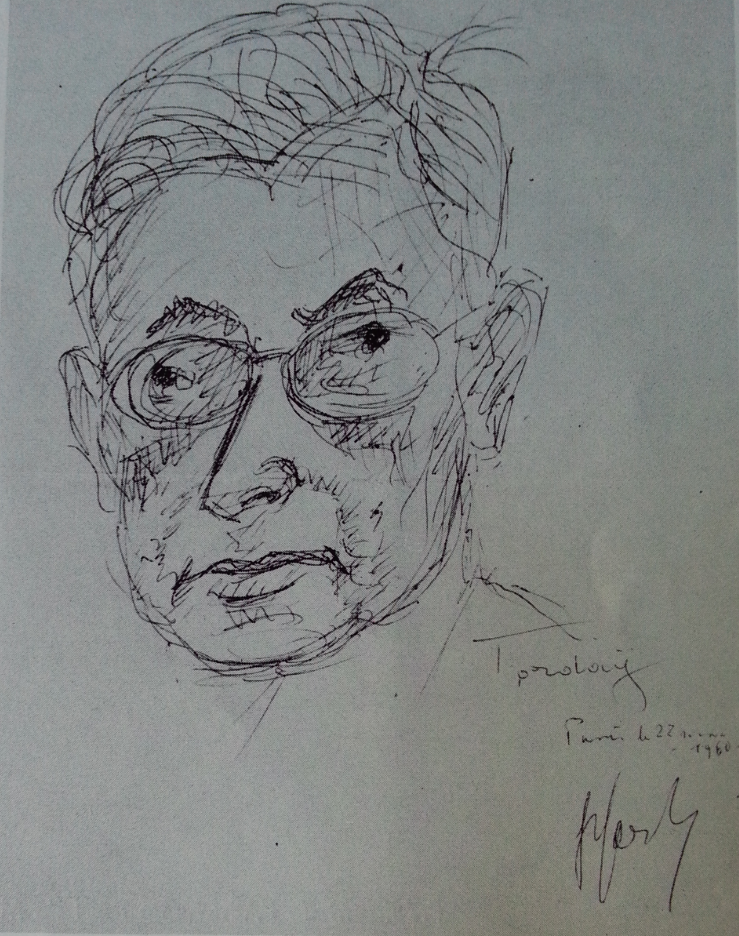
Jean-Paul Sartre

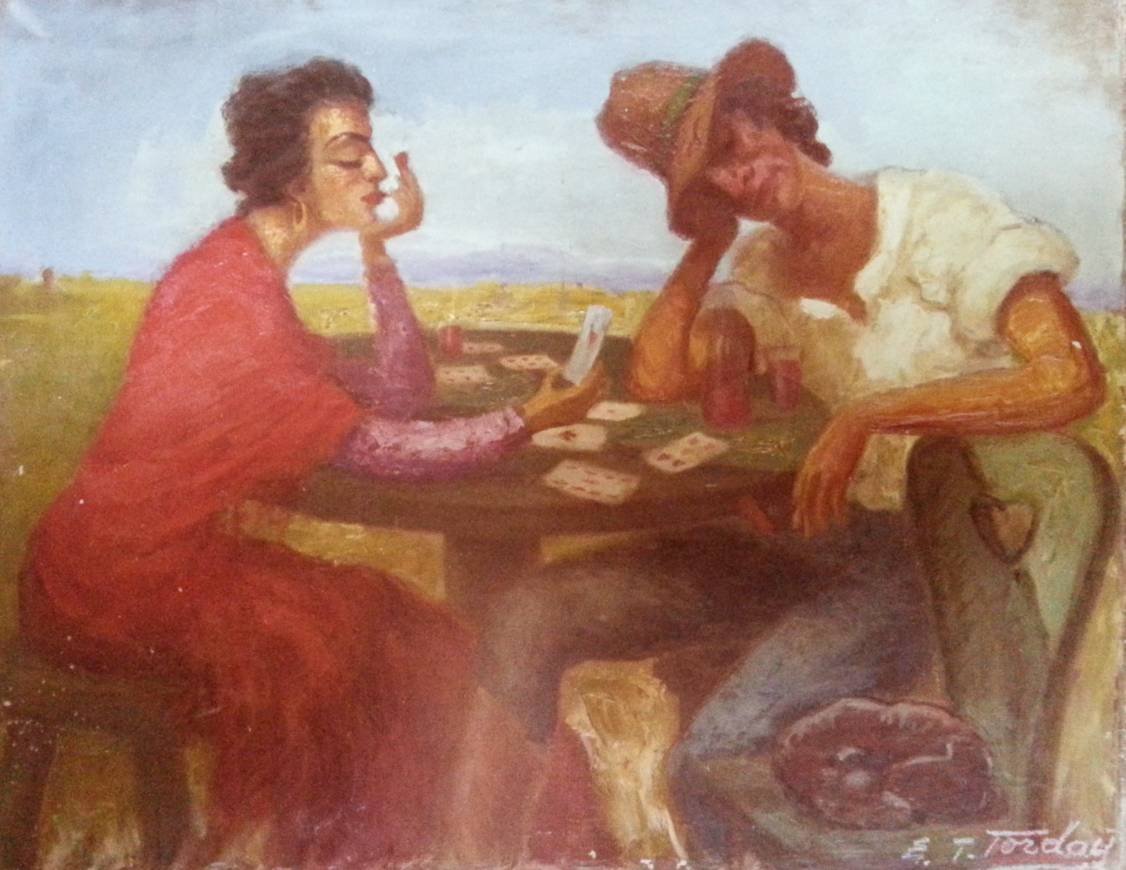
Chagrins d'amour

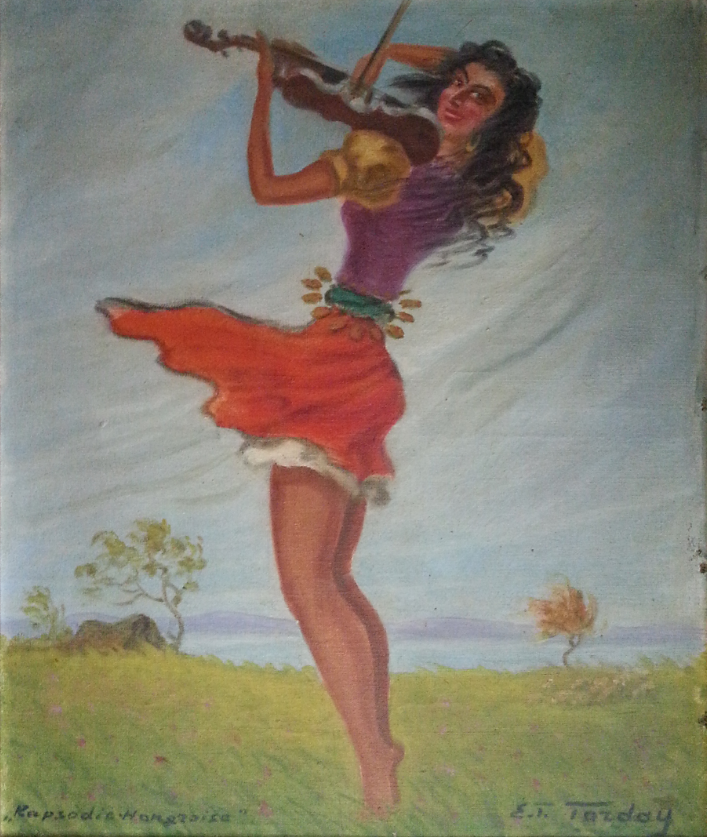
Hungarian Rhapsody

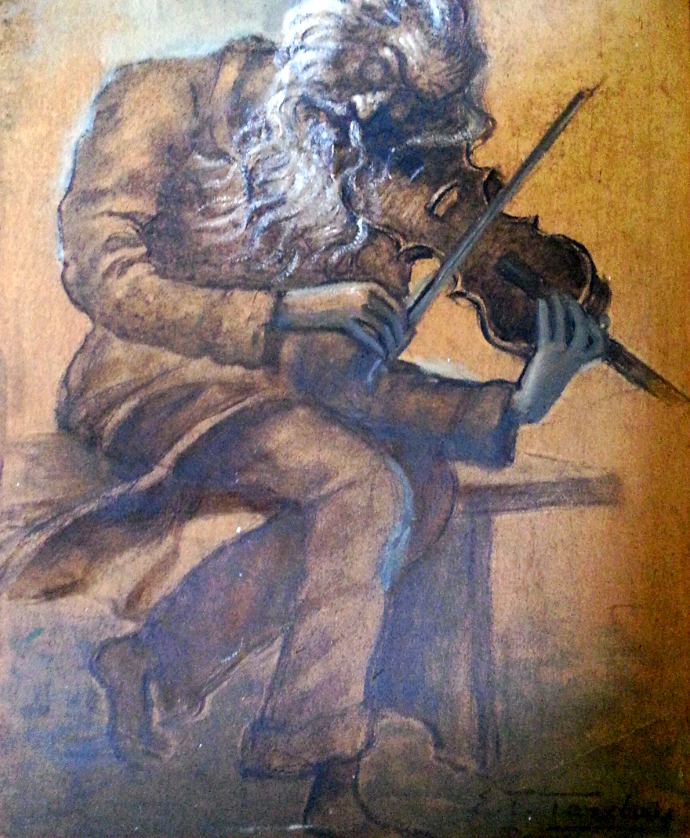
Violinist

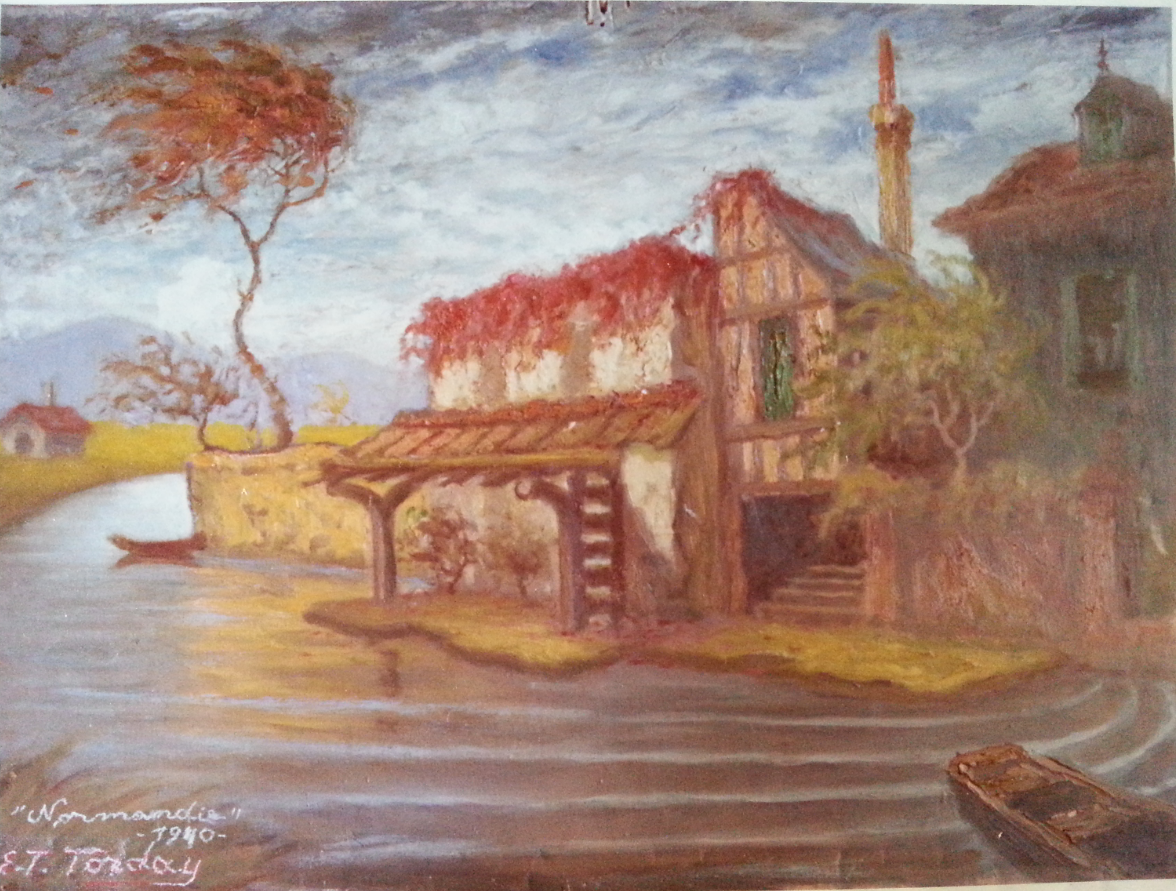
Normandy landscape

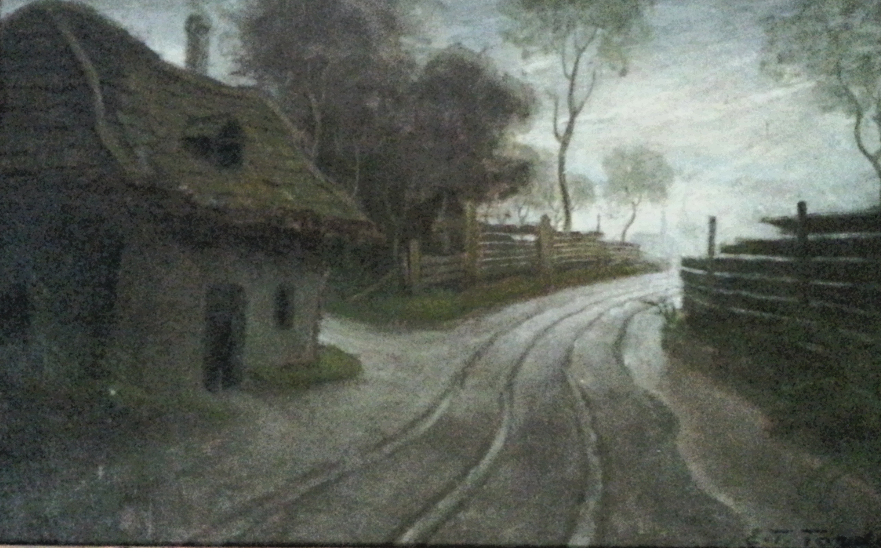
Normandy landscape

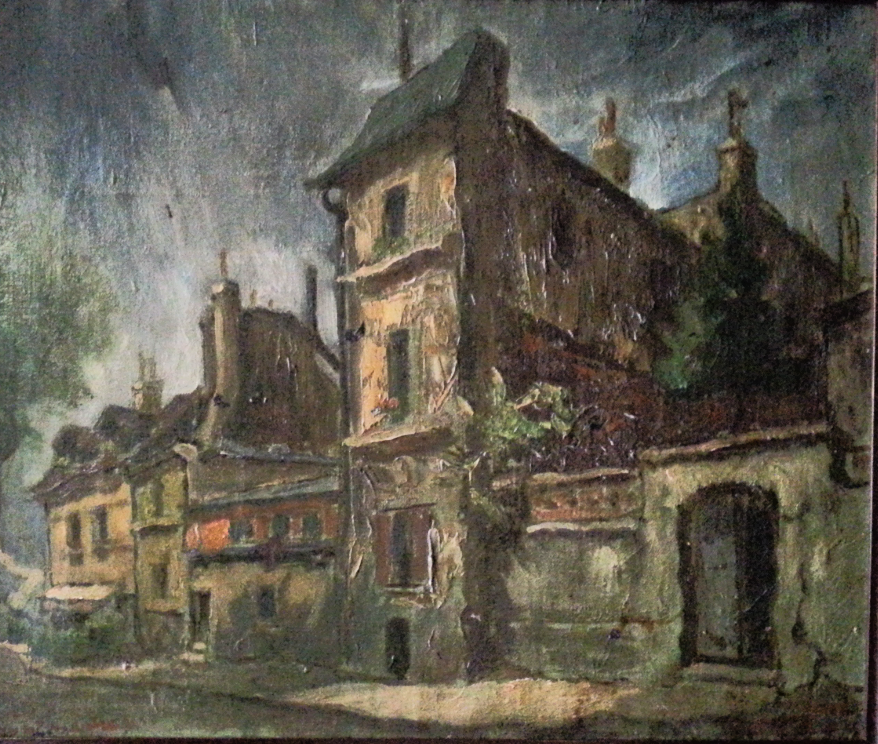
Montmartre

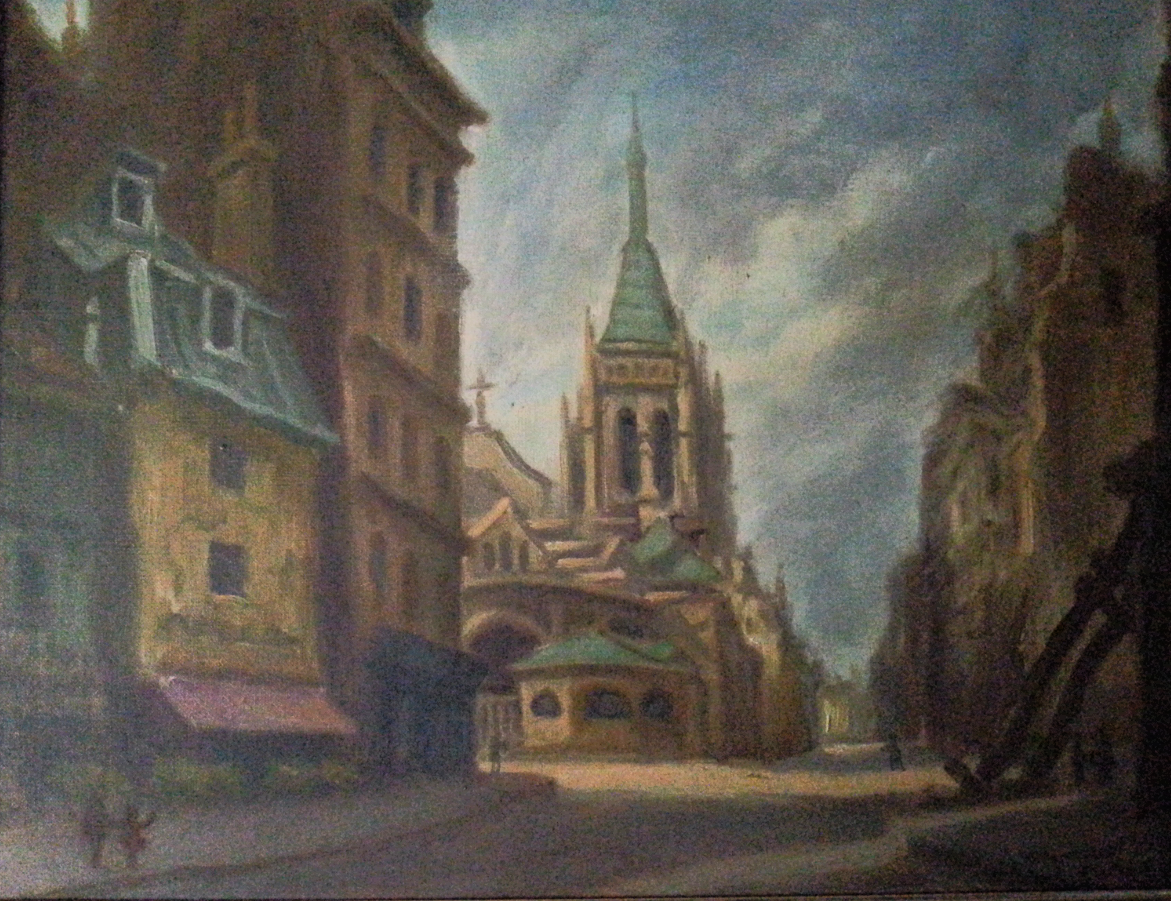
Paris landscape

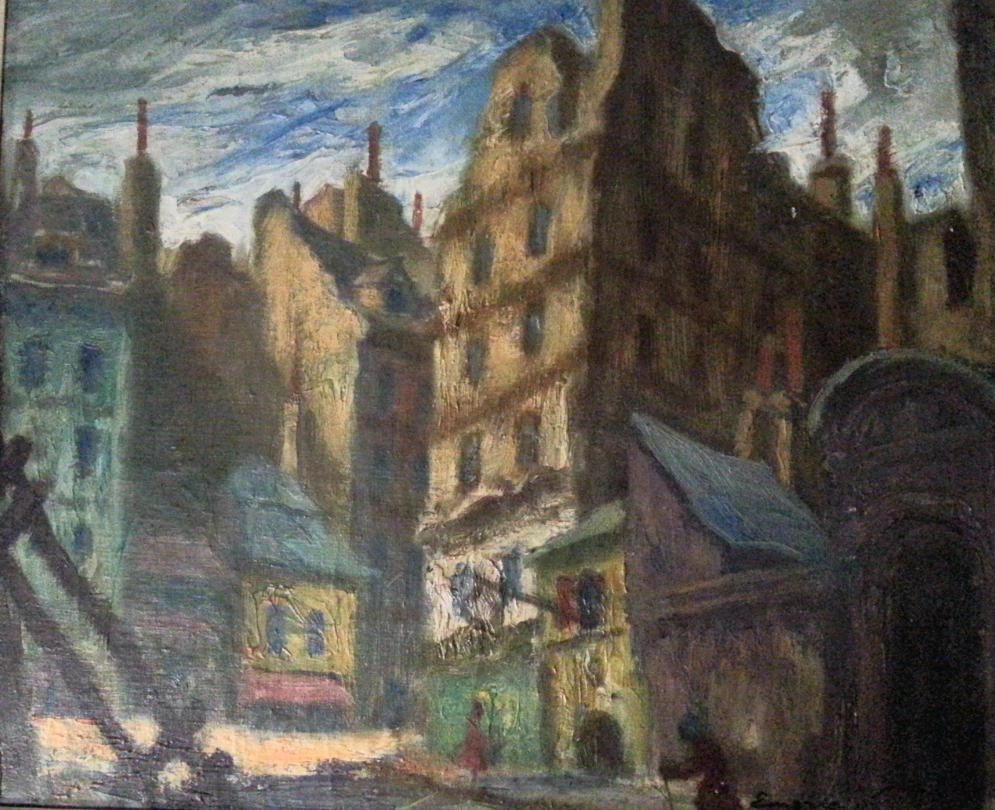
Paris landscape

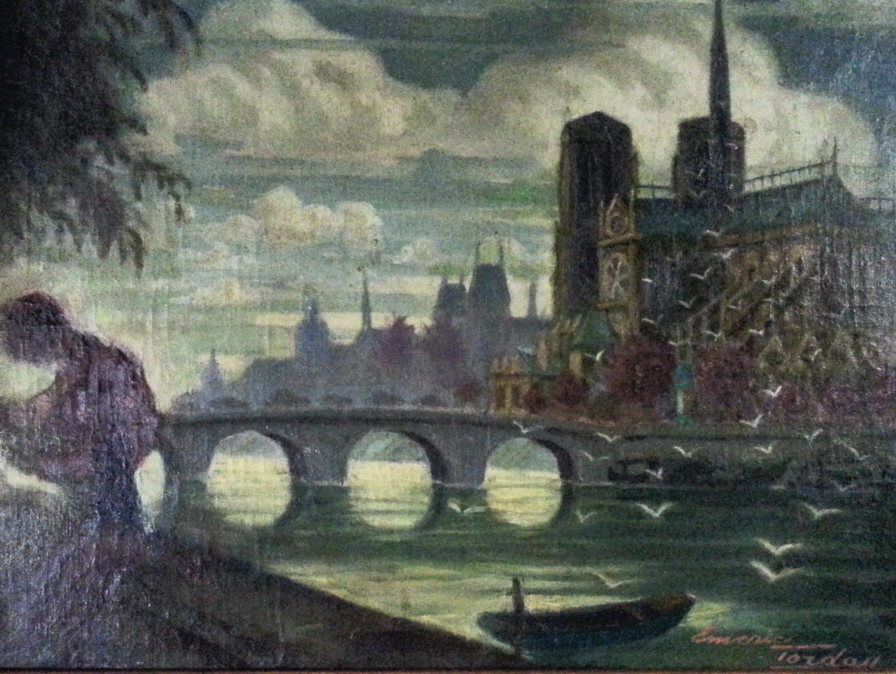
Notre-Dame de Paris
