= Basque conflict =

Spanish separatist conflict (1959–2011)

- Part of the European separatist movements in the Basque Country
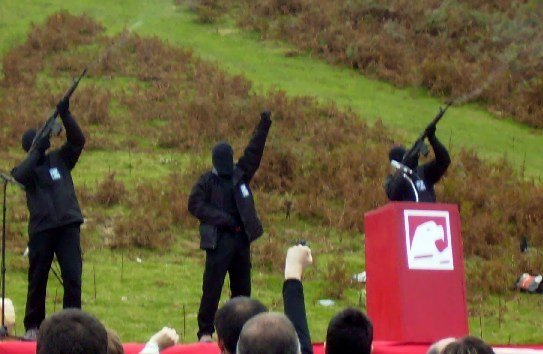
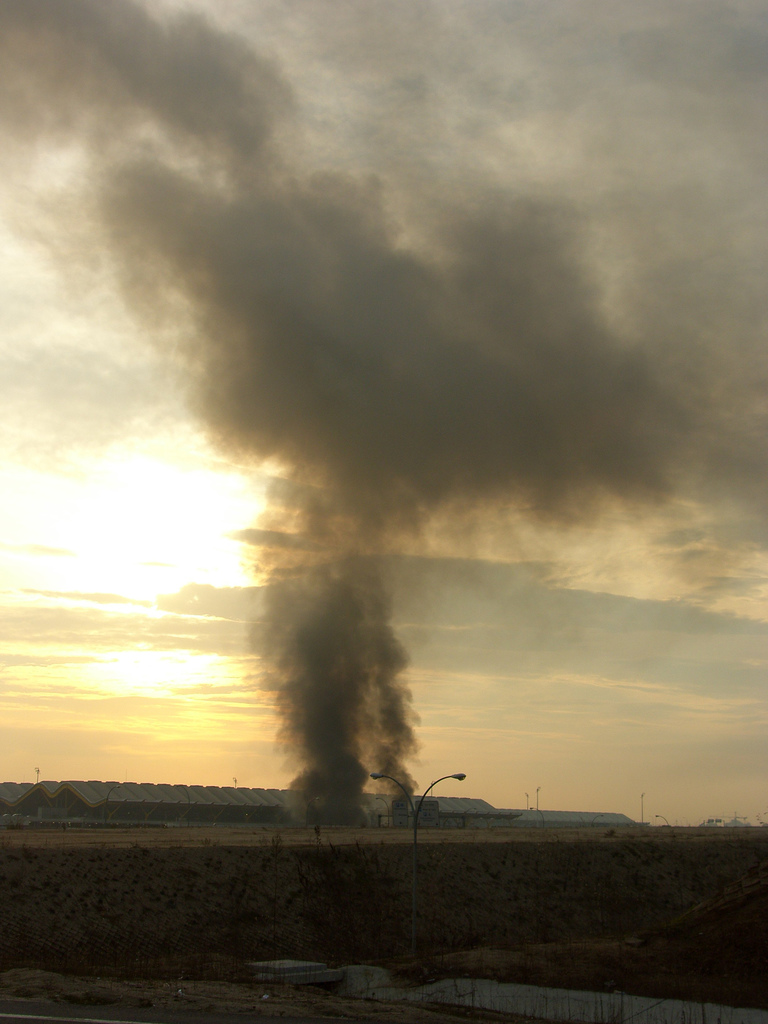
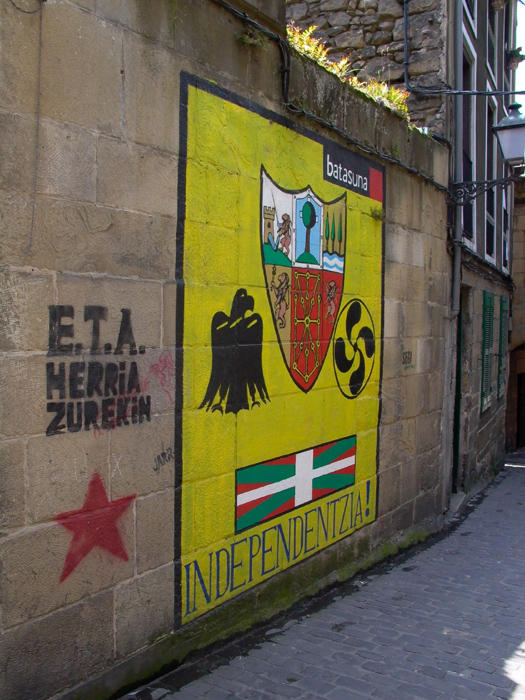
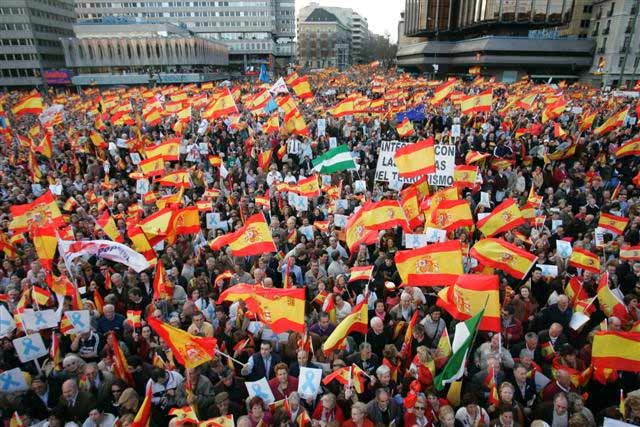
- Clockwise, starting at top left: ETA members at the 2006 Gudari Eguna in Oiartzun, Gipuzkoa; the Madrid Airport bombing; a demonstration against ETA in Madrid; pro-ETA graffiti in Pasaia.
Date	31 July 1959 – 20 October 2011 (52 years, 2 months, 2 weeks and 6 days)
Location	Greater Basque Country (Spain, France)
Result	Spanish-French victory: 2011: ETA declares definitive cessation of its armed activity; 2017: ETA fully disarms; 2018: group dissolves; Spanish and French governments maintain territorial integrity; Basque Autonomous Community regained broad self-government in 1979; Majority of Basques support peaceful political autonomy, not armed struggle

Belligerents
Spain; Ertzaintza; National Police Corps; Spanish Army; Civil Guard; Armed Police Corps; Anti-Terrorist Liberation Groups (GAL) (1983–1987); France; National Gendarmerie; National Police	Unaligned and anti-separatist paramilitary groups: Spanish Basque Battalion (1975–1981); Anti-Communist Apostolic Alliance (1976–1983); Spanish Armed Groups (1979–1980); Warriors of Christ the King (1968–1980); Spanish National Action (unknown); ETA Anti-Terrorism (1970s); Anti-Marxist Commandos (unknown); Falange y Tradición (2009)	Basque National Liberation Movement: Euskadi Ta Askatasuna (1959–2018); Iparretarrak (1972–2000); Iraultza (1982–1996); Autonomous Anti-Capitalist Commandos (late 1970s–1980s); Irrintzi (2005–2009); Kale borroka (1990s–2000s); Hordago (1980s); Euskal Zuzentasuna (1977–1979)

Casualties and losses
387 Spanish law enforcement agents killed; 120+ off-duty Spanish soldiers killed; 1 French policeman killed; Spanish civilians killed by ETA attacks: Between 340 and 450 (including minors); 2,400 wounded and 1,325 permanently incapacitated	Unknown	140 militants killed by law enforcement agencies; 101 militants killed in criminal cases involving various parties; 44 militants killed by their own explosives; 4,250 wounded; c. 30,000 arrested; 5,000+ officially verified cases of torture
- 800 killed in total by ETA

The Basque conflict, also known as the Spain–ETA conflict, was an armed and territorial conflict from 1959 to 2011 between Spain and the Basque National Liberation Movement, a group of social and political Basque organizations which sought independence from Spain and France. The movement was built around the separatist organization ETA, which had launched a campaign of attacks against Spanish administrations since 1959. ETA had been proscribed as a terrorist organization by the Spanish, British, French and American authorities at different moments. The conflict occurred mainly in Spain but also affected parts of France, where ETA often found refuge. It was the longest running violent conflict in modern Western Europe. It has been sometimes referred to as "Europe's longest war".

While ETA officially began its armed campaign in 1959, the roots of the Basque conflict trace back to the repressive policies of the regime of Francisco Franco, which suppressed the Basque language, culture, and political expression. During the Spanish Civil War, the Luftwaffe carried out the bombing of Guernica (Gernika) on behalf of Franco's forces in 1937—a traumatic event that symbolized the brutal repression of Basque identity. This historical suppression of Basque autonomy created fertile ground for resistance movements, including ETA, which later took up arms to fight for independence.

The terminology surrounding the conflict remains highly contested. While the term "Basque conflict" is preferred by many Basque nationalist groups, including those opposed to ETA's violent methods, others reject the framing of the situation purely as a "conflict," viewing it instead as a struggle for Basque self-determination.

Several Basque scholars and political leaders argue that, in spite of the struggle falling short of securing full independence, the Basque people succeeded in obtaining substantial autonomy, cultural recognition, and democratic rights within Spain.

Conversely, some Spanish commentators and officials emphasize the role of state institutions in defeating ETA, presenting the outcome as a triumph of the rule of law and counterterrorism measures.

The conflict had both political and military dimensions. Its participants included political actors, militants, and civil society figures on both sides. On one side were the abertzale left—the Basque nationalist left advocating for self-determination—and, on the other, the Spanish and French governments and their respective security forces, which conducted counterinsurgency operations against ETA and other related groups. These operations also targeted smaller youth and grassroots movements such as those involved in the kale borroka (urban youth protests and sabotage). Far-right paramilitary groups, often operating with tacit or covert support during the Spanish transition to democracy, were active in the 1970s and 1980s, carrying out attacks against Basque nationalists and suspected ETA sympathizers.

Although the debate over Basque independence dates back to the 19th century, armed conflict did not begin until the formation of ETA in 1959. Between 1959 and the end of the conflict in 2011, over 1,000 people were killed, including members of the Spanish Armed Forces, police, private security personnel, politicians, journalists, civilians, and ETA members. Thousands more were injured, and dozens were kidnapped. The prolonged violence, political tensions, and repression led to significant social disruption, with tens of thousands of Basques—particularly during the Francoist period and the height of the conflict, reportedly leaving the region either in fear of violence or to avoid prosecution.

On 20 October 2011, ETA announced a "definitive cessation of its armed activity". With the end of ETA's campaign of violence, the Spanish and French governments regained control over the Basque Country. However, the broader Basque nationalist movement continues politically, focusing on regional autonomy rather than armed independence. Spanish premier José Luis Rodríguez Zapatero described the move as "a victory for democracy, law and reason," reflecting the end of violence and the return to peaceful political engagement.

== Definition of the conflict ==
The term "Basque conflict" is used either to define:

1. the broad political conflict between a part of Basque society and the initially Francoist and later Constitutional model of the Spanish decentralized state
2. exclusively describe the armed confrontation between the separatist group ETA and the Spanish state
3. a mixture of both perspectives

France was not initially involved in the conflict with ETA nor was it ever targeted by the organization, and the French only slowly began to cooperate with Spanish law enforcement, beginning in 1987, regarding the conflict. Unlike the British participation in the conflict in Northern Ireland, the Spanish armed forces were never deployed or involved in the Basque conflict, although they represented one of ETA's major targets outside the Basque Country.

José Luis de la Granja, Santiago de Pablo and Ludger Mees argue that the term Basque conflict, while technically correct in several languages as equivalent of 'question' or 'problem', should not give the impression of a war between Euskal Herria and the states of Spain and France, preferring the terms problema or cuestión (problem or question), that would encompass both the problems in the integration of the Basque territories in the contemporary Spanish state and also the secular problems of cohabitation among the Basques themselves.

According to Paddy Woodworth in a 2009 article in The New York Times,

The core issue is whether there is a "Basque conflict" at all. Spanish public opinion, on both left and right, generally denies that there is, and sees the problem as akin to smashing a criminal mafia. But Basque nationalists, including a big majority who abhor ETA's methods, believe there is a deep underlying political conflict about Basque self-determination. They want this question to be addressed with the same imagination and courage as the British and Irish governments used in talking to the IRA. However, even raising this issue has become almost taboo among most Spaniards. They regard the Basque country, in the words of one pro-Spanish Basque politician I have interviewed, as "not just a part of Spain, but the heart of Spain."

According to Gaizka Fernández Soldevilla, the narrative of the existence of a secular conflict between Basques and Spaniards has been one of the most used tropes by ETA and the abertzale left as pretext for the activity of the former. José Antonio Pérez Pérez points out that the perception of a war between an occupying Spain and a Basque people defending themselves from genocide would have served as justifying framework of the ETA's armed activity. According to Luis Castells and Fernando Molina, the formulation of the existence of two symmetric violences, that would allow for a split of responsibilities between ETA and the states of Spain and France, carrying therefore a dilution of the responsibility of ETA, is a narrative heavily espoused by the Abertzale left, that also would present ETA as an inevitable historic response to the secular conflict. According to Fernández Soldevilla, in spite of the end of the armed activity, the narrative of the basque conflict, fixed and divulgated by abertzale organic intellectuals such as historians Francisco Letamendia and Jose Mari Lorenzo, publicists such as Iñaki Egaña or Eduardo Renobales or journalists such as Luis Núñez Astrain, would be still useful as suggestive message in order to delegitimize the current democratic system, mixing victims with victimaries and equating the Basque case to real conflicts such as those of South Africa and Northern Ireland.

This idea has been rejected, for example, by José Maria Ruiz Soroa and by the main constitutionalist Spanish parties. Some politicians have gone as far as rejecting the existence of even a political conflict and refer only to the action of a terrorist organisation against the rule of law. A group of Basque historians argued that, rather than a Basque Conflict, the situation in the Basque Country was one of "ETA totalitarianism." In 2012, Antonio Basagoiti, the head of the Basque branch of the People's Party admitted the existence of a Basque conflict, but stated that it was a political one between different entities in the Basque country. Joseba Louzao and Fernando Molina argue that the idea of pluralism used by a part of Basque historiography relates more to a particular state of the public sphere ('plurality') rather than to a positive engagement of the several political and social actors ('pluralism'); according to them, the appeal to pluralism finally led to its conceptual voidment and banalization, allowing for it to be subsumed within the metanarrative of the basque conflict.

Amaiur Senator Urko Aiartza and Julen Zabalo have written that

There is no unanimous agreement when it comes to determining the reasons for the so-called Basque conflict. According to different sources, it is either a long conflict with historical roots, an instrument of Basque nationalist politics, an attempt to impose a privilege, or evidence of the state's obstinacy. Whichever of these may be the case, an understanding of the historical relations between the Basque provinces and the Spanish and French states is indispensable in order to explain the present conflict.

== Background ==
The Basque Country (Basque: Euskal Herria) is the name given to the geographical area located on the shores of the Bay of Biscay and on the two sides of the western Pyrenees that span the border between France and Spain. Nowadays, this area roughly belongs to three different political structures: the Basque autonomous community, also known as Euskadi; Navarre in Spain; and the three Northern Basque historical provinces (Labourd, Lower Navarre and Soule), administratively part of the French department of Pyrénées-Atlantiques. Approximately 3,000,000 people live in the Basque Country.

The Basques have managed to preserve their own identifying characteristics such as their own culture and language throughout the centuries and today a large part of the population shares a collective consciousness and a desire to be self-governed, either with further political autonomy or full independence. For instance, the football club Athletic Bilbao, maintains a signing policy of only recruiting Basques born or raised players. Over the centuries, the Basque Country has maintained various levels of political self-governance under different Spanish political frameworks. Nowadays, Euskadi enjoys the highest level of self-governance of any nonstate entity within the European Union. However, tensions about the type of relationship the Basque territories should maintain with the Spanish authorities have existed since the origins of the Spanish state and in many cases have fuelled military confrontation, such as the Carlist Wars and the Spanish Civil War.

Following the 1936 coup d'état that overthrew the Spanish republican government, a civil war between Spanish nationalist and republican forces broke out. Nearly all Basque nationalist forces, led by the Basque Nationalist Party (PNV) sided with the Republic, even though Basque nationalists in Álava and Navarre fought along Basque Carlists on the side of Spanish nationalists. The war ended with the victory of the nationalist forces, when General Francisco Franco established a dictatorship that lasted for almost four decades. During Franco's dictatorship, Basque language and culture were banned, institutions and political organisations abolished (to a lesser degree in Alava and Navarre), and people killed, tortured and imprisoned for their political beliefs. Although repression in the Basque Country was considerably less violent than in other parts of Spain, thousands of Basques were forced to go into exile, usually to Latin America or France.

Influenced by wars of national liberation such as the Algerian War or by conflicts such as the Cuban Revolution, and disappointed with the weak opposition of the PNV against Franco's regime, a young group of students formed ETA in 1959. It first started as an organization demanding the independence of the Basque Country, from a socialist position, and it soon started its armed campaign. According to Xosé Manoel Núñez Seixas, ETA became a socialist and revolutionary organization using violence after inner struggles related both to the difficulties found in applying a Third World model of national liberation in an already industrialized territory and the division between purely nationalist stances (such as the Branka splinter group) and the revolutionary ones.

== Timeline ==
=== 1959–1979 ===
ETA's first attacks were sometimes approved of by a part of the Spanish and Basque societies, who saw ETA and the fight for independence as a fight against the Franco administration. In 1970, several members of the organization were condemned to death in the Burgos trials (Proceso de Burgos), although international pressure resulted in commutation of the death sentences. ETA slowly became more active and powerful, and in 1973 the organisation was able to kill the president of the Government and possible successor of Franco, Luis Carrero Blanco. From that moment on, the regime became tougher in their struggle against ETA: many members died in shootouts with security forces and police carried out big raids, such as the arrest of hundreds of members of ETA in 1975, after the infiltration of a double agent inside the organisation.

In mid-1975, a political bloc known as Koordinadora Abertzale Sozialista (KAS) was created by Basque nationalist organisations. Away from the PNV, the bloc comprised several organisations formed by people contrary to the right-wing Franco's regime and most of them had their origins in several factions of ETA, which was part of the bloc as well. They also adopted the same ideology as the armed organisation, socialism. The creation of KAS would mean the beginning of the Basque National Liberation Movement.

In November 1975, Franco died and Spain started its transition to democracy. Many Basque activists and politicians returned from exile, although some Basque organizations were not legalized as had happened with other Spanish organizations. On the other side, the death of Franco elevated Juan Carlos I to the throne, who chose Adolfo Suárez as Prime Minister of Spain. Following the approval of the Spanish constitution in 1978, a Statute of Autonomy was promulgated and approved in referendum. The Basque Country was organized as an Autonomous Community.

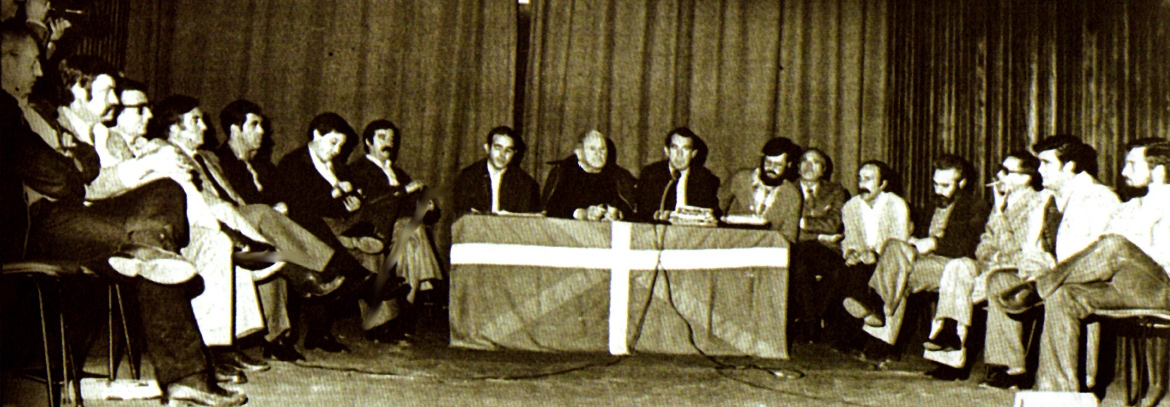
The Alsasua meeting is considered to be the beginning of Herri Batasuna and the Abertzale left

The new Spanish constitution had overwhelming support around Spain, with 88.5% voting in favour on a turnout of 67.1%. In the three provinces of the Basque Country, these figures were lower, with 70.2% voting in favour (the lowest result in the country) on a turnout of 44.7%. This was due to the call to abstention by EAJ-PNV and the creation of a coalition of Abertzale left organisations brought together to advocate for "no" in the referendum, as they felt that the constitution did not meet their demands for independence. The coalition was the beginning of the political party Herri Batasuna, which would become the main political front of the Basque National Liberation Movement. The coalition had its origins in another one made two years before, named Mesa de Alsasua. ETA also felt that the constitution was unsatisfactory and intensified their armed campaign: 1978 to 1981 were ETA's bloodiest years with more than 230 people killed. Around 1975, the first far right paramilitary organizations (to which former OAS members joined) that fought against ETA and its supporters had been created, such as the Triple A (Alianza Apostólica Anticomunista), Guerrilleros de Cristo Rey, Batallón Vasco-español (BVE) and Antiterrorismo ETA (ATE); (Note: There was a lapse of 17 months between the end of the attacks by these groups and the start of the activities of the GAL in October 1983 with the killing of Lasa and Zabala, already under the government of Felipe González.) 41 deaths and 36 wounded have been reported in attacks blamed on paramilitary far-right organisations in the 1977–1982 period.

Also in the late 1970s, several Basque nationalist organizations, such as Iparretarrak, Hordago or Euskal Zuzentasuna, started to operate in the French Basque Country. An anarchist breakaway of ETA, Comandos Autónomos Anticapitalistas, also started carrying out attacks around the Basque Country. A similar but smaller organization to ETA, Terra Lliure, appeared demanding independence for the Catalan Countries. The Basque conflict had always had an influence on the Catalan society and politics, due to the similarities between Catalonia and the Basque Country.

=== 1980–1999 ===
During the process of electing Leopoldo Calvo-Sotelo as Spain's new president in February 1981, Civil Guards and army members broke into the Congress of Deputies and held all deputies at gunpoint. One of the reasons that led to the coup d'état was the increase in ETA's violence. The coup failed after the King called for the military powers to obey the Constitution. Days after the coup, ETA's faction politiko-militarra started its disbanding, with most of its members joining Euskadiko Ezkerra, a leftist nationalist party away from the Abertzale left. General elections were held in 1982, and Felipe González, from the Socialist Workers' Party became the new president, while Herri Batasuna won two seats. In the Basque Country, Carlos Garaikoetxea from the PNV became lehendakari in 1979. During those years, hundreds of members of Herri Batasuna were arrested, especially after some of them sang the Eusko Gudariak in front of Juan Carlos I.

After Felipe González's victory, the Grupos Antiterroristas de Liberación (GAL), death squads established by officials belonging to the Spanish government, were created. Using state terrorism, the GAL carried out dozens of attacks around the Basque Country, killing 27 people. It targeted ETA and Herri Batasuna members, although sometimes civilians were also killed. The GAL were active from 1983 until 1987, a period referred to as the Spanish Dirty War. ETA responded to the dirty war by intensifying its attacks. These included the Plaza República Dominicana bombing in Madrid - which killed 12 police officers, the Hipercor bombing in Barcelona - which killed 21 civilians and the Zaragoza barracks bombing - which killed 11 people. After the Hipercor bombing, most of the Spanish and Basque political parties signed many pacts against ETA, such as the Madrid pact or the Ajuria-Enea pact. It was during this time that Herri Batasuna got its best results: it was the most voted party in the Basque autonomous community for the European Parliament elections.

While talks between the Spanish government and ETA had already taken place in the late 1970s and early 1980s, which had led to the dissolution of ETA politiko-militarra, it was not until 1989 that both sides held formal peace talks. In January, ETA announced a 60-day ceasefire, while negotiations between ETA and the government were taking place in Algiers. No successful conclusion was reached, and ETA resumed violence.

After the end of the dirty war period, France agreed to cooperate with the Spanish authorities in the arrest and extradition of ETA members. These would often travel between the two countries, using France as a base for attacks and training. This cooperation reached its peak in 1992, with the arrest of all ETA leaders in the town of Bidart. The raid came months before the 1992 Olympic Games in Barcelona, with which ETA tried to gather worldwide attention with massive attacks around Catalonia. After that, ETA announced a two-month ceasefire, while they restructured the whole organisation and created the kale borroka groups.

In 1995, ETA tried to kill José María Aznar, who would become prime minister of Spain one year later, and Juan Carlos I. That same year, the organisation made a peace proposal, which was refused by the government. The following year, ETA announced a one-week ceasefire and tried to engage in peace talks with the government, a proposal that was once again rejected by the new conservative government. In 1997, a young councillor, Miguel Ángel Blanco, was kidnapped and killed by the organisation. The killing produced a widespread rejection by Spanish and Basque societies, massive demonstrations and a loss of sympathisers, with even some ETA prisoners and members of Herri Batasuna condemning the killing. That same year, the Spanish government arrested 23 leaders of Herri Batasuna for allegedly collaborating with ETA. After the arrest, the government started to investigate Herri Batasuna's ties with ETA, and the coalition changed its name to Euskal Herritarrok, with Arnaldo Otegi as their leader.

In the 1998 Basque elections, the Abertzale left got its best results since the 1980s, and Euskal Herritarrok became the third main force in the Basque Country. This increase of support was due to the declaration of a ceasefire by ETA one month before the elections. The ceasefire came after Herri Batasuna and several Basque organisations, such as the PNV, which at that time was part of the PP's government, agreed to the Lizarra pact, aimed at putting pressure on the Spanish government to make further concessions towards independence. The Basque nationalist forces agreed in defining the Basque conflict as having a political nature and in presenting ETA and the Spanish State as the two conflicting parties. Influenced by the Northern Ireland peace process, ETA and the Spanish government engaged in peace talks, which ended in late 1999, after ETA announced the end of the ceasefire.

=== 2000–2009 ===
In 2000, ETA resumed violence and intensified its attacks, especially against senior politicians, such as Ernest Lluch. At the same time, dozens of ETA members were arrested and the Abertzale left lost some of the support it had obtained in the 1998 elections. The breaking of the truce provoked Herri Batasuna's dissolution and its reformation into a new party called Batasuna. Following disagreements over the internal organization of Batasuna, a group broke away to form a separate political party, Aralar, present mainly in Navarre. In 2002, the Spanish government passed a law, named Ley de Partidos (Law of Parties), which allows the banning of any party that directly or indirectly condones terrorism or sympathises with a terrorist organisation. As ETA was considered a terrorist organisation and Batasuna did not condemn its actions, the government banned Batasuna in 2003. It was the first time since Franco's dictatorship that a political party had been banned in Spain. That same year, Spanish authorities closed the only newspaper written fully in Basque, Egunkaria, and journalists were arrested, due to allegations of links with ETA which were dismissed by a Spanish justice seven years later. In 1998, another newspaper, Egin, had already been closed on similar grounds that were also dismissed eleven years later.

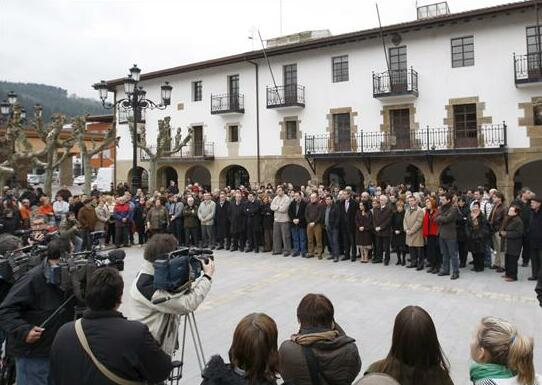
Demonstrations after every ETA attack were common around Spain

After the government falsely accused ETA of carrying out the 2004 Madrid train bombings, the conservative government lost the elections to the Socialist Workers' Party, and José Luis Rodríguez Zapatero became the new Prime Minister of Spain. One of Zapatero's first actions was to engage in new peace talks with ETA. In mid-2006, the organisation declared a ceasefire, and conversations between Batasuna, ETA and the Basque and Spanish governments started. Despite the claims of peace talks ending in December, when ETA broke the truce with a massive car bomb at Madrid-Barajas Airport, a new round of conversations took place in May 2007. ETA officially ended the ceasefire in 2007, and resumed its attacks around Spain. From that moment on, the Spanish government and police intensified their struggle against both ETA and the Abertzale left. Hundreds of members of the armed organisation were arrested after the end of the truce, with four of its leaders being arrested in less than one year. Meanwhile, the Spanish authorities banned more political parties such as Basque Nationalist Action, Communist Party of the Basque Homelands and Demokrazia Hiru Milioi. Youth organisations such as Segi were banned, while members of trade unions, such as Langile Abertzaleen Batzordeak were arrested. In 2008, Falange y Tradición, a new Spanish far-right nationalist group, appeared and carried out dozens of attacks in the Basque Country. The organisation was dismantled in 2009.

=== 2010-2011 ===
In 2009 and 2010, ETA suffered even more blows to its organization and capacity, with more than 50 members arrested in the first half of 2010. At the same time, the banned Abertzale left started to develop documents and meetings, where they committed to a "democratic process" that "must be developed in a complete absence of violence". Due to these demands, ETA announced in September that they were stopping their armed actions.

The final declaration of the Donostia-San Sebastián International Peace Conference, read by Bertie Ahern, with Basque language subtitles.

On 17 October 2011, an international peace conference was held in Donostia-San Sebastián, aimed at promoting a resolution to the Basque conflict. It was organized by the Basque citizens' group Lokarri and included leaders of Basque parties, as well as six international personalities known for their work in the field of politics and pacification: Kofi Annan (former UN Secretary-General), Bertie Ahern (former Taoiseach of Ireland), Gro Harlem Brundtland (international leader in sustainable development and public health, former Prime Minister of Norway), Pierre Joxe (former Interior Minister of France), Gerry Adams (president of Sinn Féin and member of the Irish Parliament) and Jonathan Powell (British diplomat who served as the first Downing Street Chief of Staff). Tony Blair (former Prime Minister of the UK) could not be present due to commitments in the Middle East, but he supported the final declaration. Former US President Jimmy Carter and former US senator George J. Mitchell (involved in the Northern Ireland peace process) also backed this declaration.

The conference resulted in a five-point statement that included a plea for ETA to renounce any armed activities and to demand instead negotiations with the Spanish and French authorities to end the conflict. It was seen as a possible prelude to the end of ETA's violent campaign for an independent Basque homeland.

Three days later – on 20 October – ETA announced a "definitive cessation of its armed activity". They said they were ending their 43-year armed campaign for independence and called on Spain and France to open talks. At this time ETA was believed to have no more than 50 active members capable of organizing an attack. Spanish premier José Luis Rodríguez Zapatero described the move as "a victory for democracy, law and reason".

=== Aftermath ===
In 2016 French police made a declaration warning that ETA had made no steps towards dissolution. In March 2017 ETA declared that it would disarm completely by 8 April. On that date, civilian 'go-betweens' (Artisans of Peace) handed a list of 8 coordinates to the authorities which showed the locations of weapons caches in southwestern France used by the group. The caches were reported to have contained 120 firearms, about 3 tonnes of explosives and several thousand rounds of ammunition, which were seized by the Spanish and French authorities. The Spanish government stated that ETA will gain no impunity for their disarmament, and urged the group to dissolve formally. On 3 May 2018, during a ceremony held at the Centre for Humanitarian Dialogue in Geneva, Switzerland, the ETA released a statement announcing its permanent dissolution, which was distributed by the centre's director. Following this announcement, a ceremony was organized in Northern Basque Country, in Cambo-les-Bains (Basque: Kanbo) where the "declaration of Arnaga" was pronounced.

== Casualties ==
Estimates of the total number of conflict-related deaths vary and are highly disputed. The number of deaths caused by ETA is consistent among different sources, such as the Spanish Interior Ministry, the Basque government, and most major news agencies. According to these sources, the number of deaths caused by ETA are 829. This list does not include Begoña Urroz, killed in 1960 when she was 22 months old. Although this killing was attributed by Ernest Lluch to ETA in 2000, as revealed in El País, the attack was committed by the DRIL (Directorio Revolucionario Ibérico de Liberación).

Some organizations such as the Colectivo de Víctimas del Terrorismo en el País Vasco raise the death toll of ETA's victims to 952. This is due to the inclusion to the list of several unresolved attacks such as the Hotel Corona de Aragón fire. The Asociación de Víctimas del Terrorismo also includes the victims of the Corona de Aragón fire on its list of ETA's deaths. Sources have suggested ETA responsibility in the crash of Iberia Airlines Flight 610 at Monte Oiz (Bilbao) on 19 February 1985 with 148 killed

Regarding the Basque National Liberation Movement side the Euskal Memoria foundation, linked to the Abertzale left, and born in 2009 with the proclaimed purpose of having a database in order to "counter the lies from the State", list the number of deaths on their side as 474 in the period between 1960 and 2010. News agency Eusko News states that at least 368 people died on the Basque nationalist side. Most of the lists also include an undefined number of suicides caused by the conflict, coming from former ETA members, tortured people or policemen. Additional death causes in the Euskal Memoria list such as deaths to natural illnesses, a death of an ETA member due to a stroke suffered while having sexual relations, deaths due to the accidental activation of ETA bombs by ETA members, deaths in car and plane accidents, the death of common criminals, the death of a football fan killed by rivals, and deaths abroad such as a death in a mine in Nicaragua, a missionary killed by guerrilla in Colombia, two Uruguayans in Uruguay, two guerrilla collaborators in El Salvador and a protester in Rome have been claimed.

=== Responsibility ===
Responsibility for killing
Responsible party	No.
Euskadi Ta Askatasuna	829
Paramilitary and far-right groups	72
Spanish security forces	169
Other cases	127
Total	1197

=== Status ===
ETA deaths by status of victim
Status	No.
Civilian	343
Members of security forces	486
of whom:
Guardia Civil	203
Cuerpo Nacional de Policía	146
Spanish Army	98
Policia Municipal	24
Ertzaintza	13
Mossos d'Esquadra	1
French National Police	1

== Prisoners ==
The Spanish and French law enforcement agencies have convicted a number of people for terrorist activities (primarily murder or attempted murder), or for belonging to ETA or organizations subservient to this organization. A small minority have been imprisoned for "enaltecimiento del terrorismo" which literally translates as "glorification of terrorism". The number of people incarcerated reached a peak of 762 in 2008. These prisoners are jailed in prisons all over France and Spain "to make it difficult for ETA to communicate with them," according to non-revealed sources. There have officially been 5,500 claims or complaints of torture or mistreating in police custody in the Basque Autonomous Community, but some sources and Spanish authorities claim that many of those claims are false because ETA used to instruct their militants to systematically denounce torture by the Spanish Forces.

For the Abertzale left this is one of the most emotive issues relating to Basque Nationalism. Demonstrations calling for their return to the Basque region often involve thousands of people. Currently there is a highly publicised campaign calling for the return of these dispersed prisoners to the Basque Country. Its slogan is "Euskal presoak- Euskal Herrira" ("Basque prisoners- to the Basque Country").

Some groups such as Etxerat have been calling for a general amnesty, similar to that which took place in Northern Ireland in 2000. The Spanish government has so far rejected moves to treat all prisoners in the same way. Instead they opened the 'Via Nanclares' in 2009 which is a way for individual prisoners to get better conditions, and eventually gain limited release. It involves individuals' asking for forgiveness, distancing themselves from ETA and paying compensation.

== See also ==
- Politics in the Basque Country
- List of conflicts in Europe
- List of films about the Basque conflict
- International Contact Group (Basque politics)
- History of the Basque people
- The Troubles – Conflict in Northern Ireland
- Corsican conflict – Conflict over Corsica, France
- Insurgency in Aceh - Conflict over Aceh, Indonesia

== Bibliography ==
- Castells Arteche, Luis; Molina Aparicio, Fernando (2013). "Bajo la sombra de Vichy: el relato del pasado reciente en la Euskadi actual". Ayer. 89 (1): 215–227. ISSN 1134-2277.
- Fernández Soldevilla, Gaizka (2016). "Mitos que matan: La narrativa del «conflicto vasco» (y sus consecuencias)". La voluntad del gudari: génesis y metástasis de la violencia de ETA. Madrid: Editorial Tecnos. pp. 23–62. ISBN 978-84-309-6844-2.
- Mata, José Manuel (2005). "Terrorism and nationalist conflict: the weakness of democracy in the Basque Country". In Sebastian Balfour (ed.). The Politics of Contemporary Spain. London and New York: Routledge. pp. 81–105. ISBN 0-415-35677-6.
- Granja, José Luis de la; Pablo, Santiago de; Mees, Ludger (2011). "La cuestión vasca en el hispanismo internacional: The Basque question in the international Hispanism". Historia Contemporánea. 42 (42). Bilbao: Universidad del País Vasco-Euskal Herriko Unibertsitatea: 429–470. ISSN 1130-2402.
- Molina, Fernando; Louzao, Joseba (2014). "El pluralismo vasco: política e historiografía". Historia y política (32). Madrid: 301–328. ISSN 1575-0361.
- Núñez Seixas, Xosé M. (2007). "Nuevos y viejos nacionalistas: la cuestión territorial en el tardofranquismo, 1959-1975". Ayer (68). Asociación de Historia Contemporánea and Marcial Pons Ediciones de Historia: 59–87. ISSN 1134-2277. JSTOR 41325308.
- Pérez Pérez, José Antonio (2015). "Historia, memoria y víctimas de la violencia política" (PDF). Huarte de San Juan. Geografía e Historia. 22. Pamplona: Universidad Pública de Navarra / Nafarroako Unibertsitate Publikoa: 89–116. ISSN 2341-0809.

=== Further reading ===
- ETA. Historia política de una lucha armada by Luigi Bruni, Txalaparta, 1998, ISBN 84-86597-03-X
