= International Verification Commission (Basque Country) =

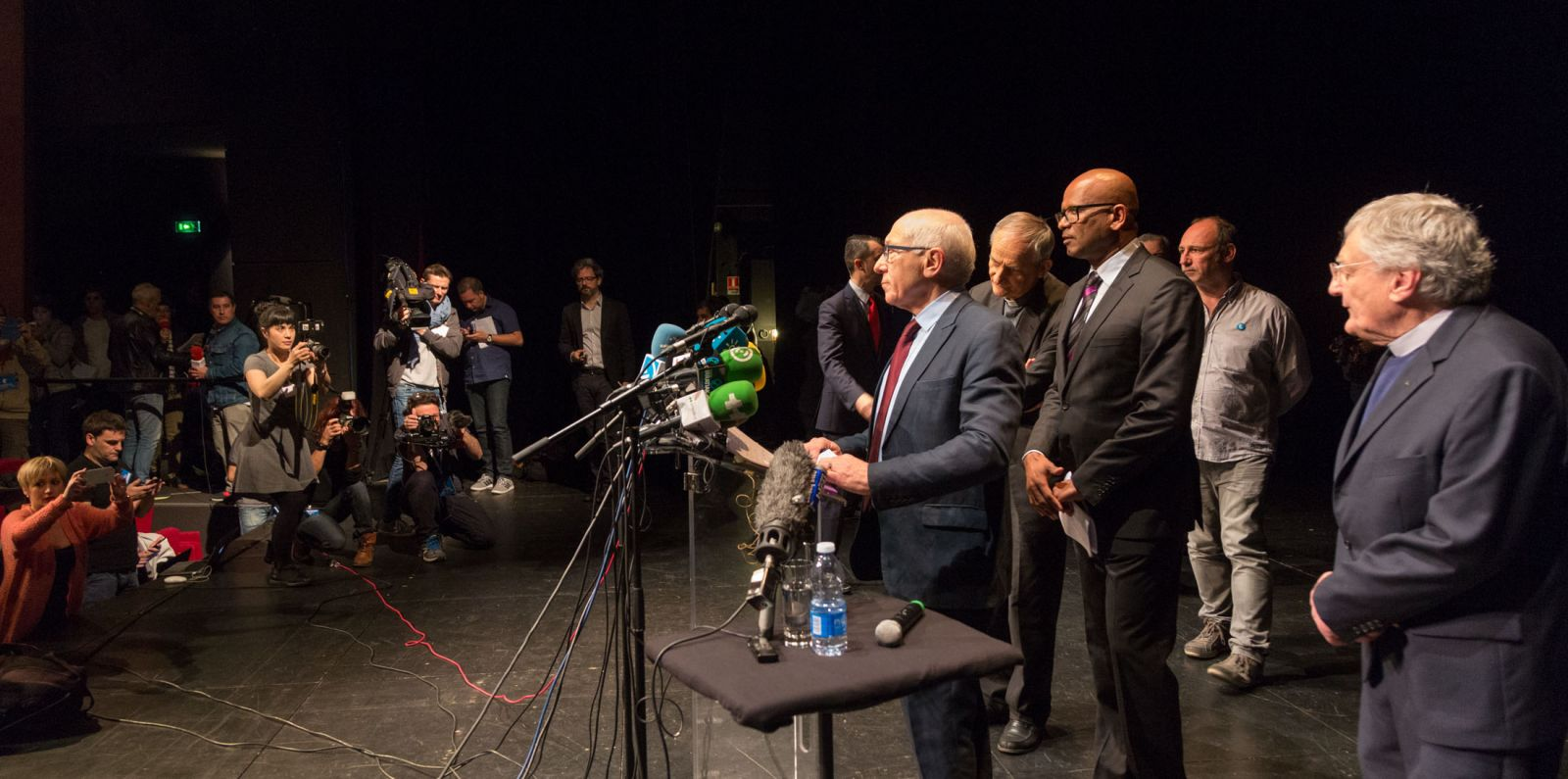
Ram Manikkalingam, chairman of the IVC participating in the press conference in Baiona on 8 April 2017

The International Verification Commission (IVC) for the peace process in the *Basque Country was created on 28 September 2011 to verify ETA's declaration of a definitive end of violence. Since 2011 to 2017, the Commission, together with Basque institutions and Basque civil society, worked towards achieving an orderly end of violence.

The Commission, after the disarmament day on 8 April 2017, verified that ETA has fulfilled its commitment to cease all violent actions. The regional parliaments of the Basque Autonomous Community and Navarre in Spain confirmed their support to the mission of the Commission in late March and early April.

The Commission members are listed below:

- Ram Manikkalingam, Chairman of the Commission. Director of Dialogue Advisory Group and Professor at Amsterdam University, he was also Adviser to the President of Sri Lanka for negotiations with the Tamil Tigers.
- Ronald Kasrils, anti-apartheid activist, former Minister of Intelligence and Deputy Defense Minister of South Africa.
- Satish Nambiar, former Deputy Chief of the Indian Army and former Commander and Head of Mission of the UN Protection Force in former Yugoslavia in 1992 and 1993.
- Christopher Maccabe, former Political Director of the Northern Ireland Office of the United Kingdom, and a former British Joint Secretary of the British–Irish Intergovernmental Conference.
- Fleur Ravensbergen, Assistant Director of Dialogue Advisory Group.
- Aracelly Santana, former Deputy Special Representative of the Secretary-General and Deputy Head of Mission, United Nations Mission in Nepal (UMIN) and former Director of America's Office in the United Nations Department of Political Affairs.

== See also ==
- Donostia-San Sebastián International Peace Conference
- International Contact Group (Basque politics)
- Artisans of Peace
- Brian Currin
