= Artisans of Peace =

Activist group in the Northern Basque Country, France

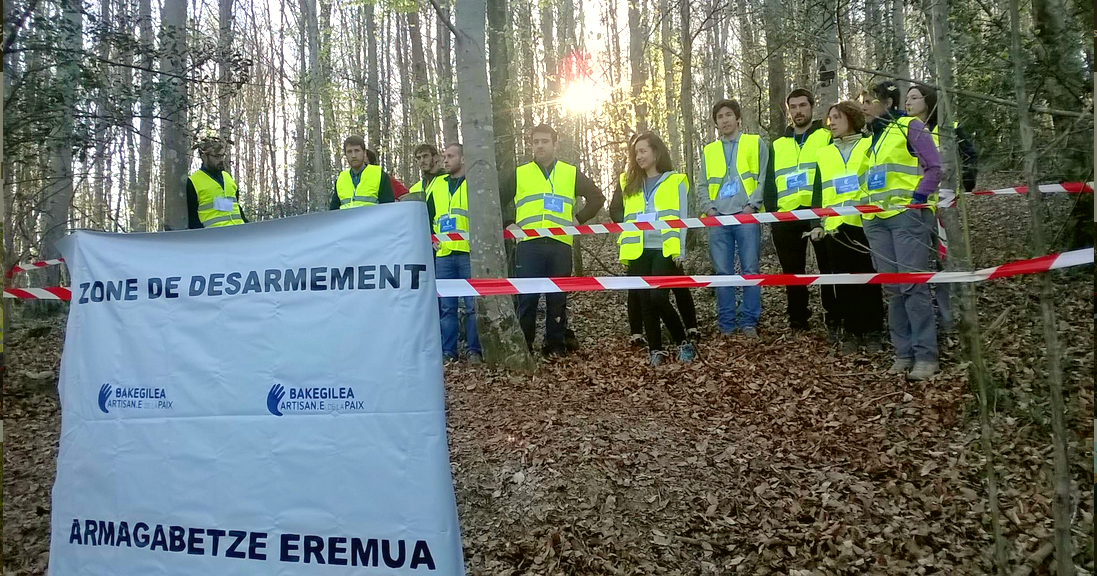
"The Artisans of Peace" worked as peace brokers in order to obtain the disarmament of the separatist group ETA. In the picture some of them waiting for the French Police to arrive to one of the weapons dumps, 172 new artisans remained next to caches as custodians and observers. (2017-04-08)

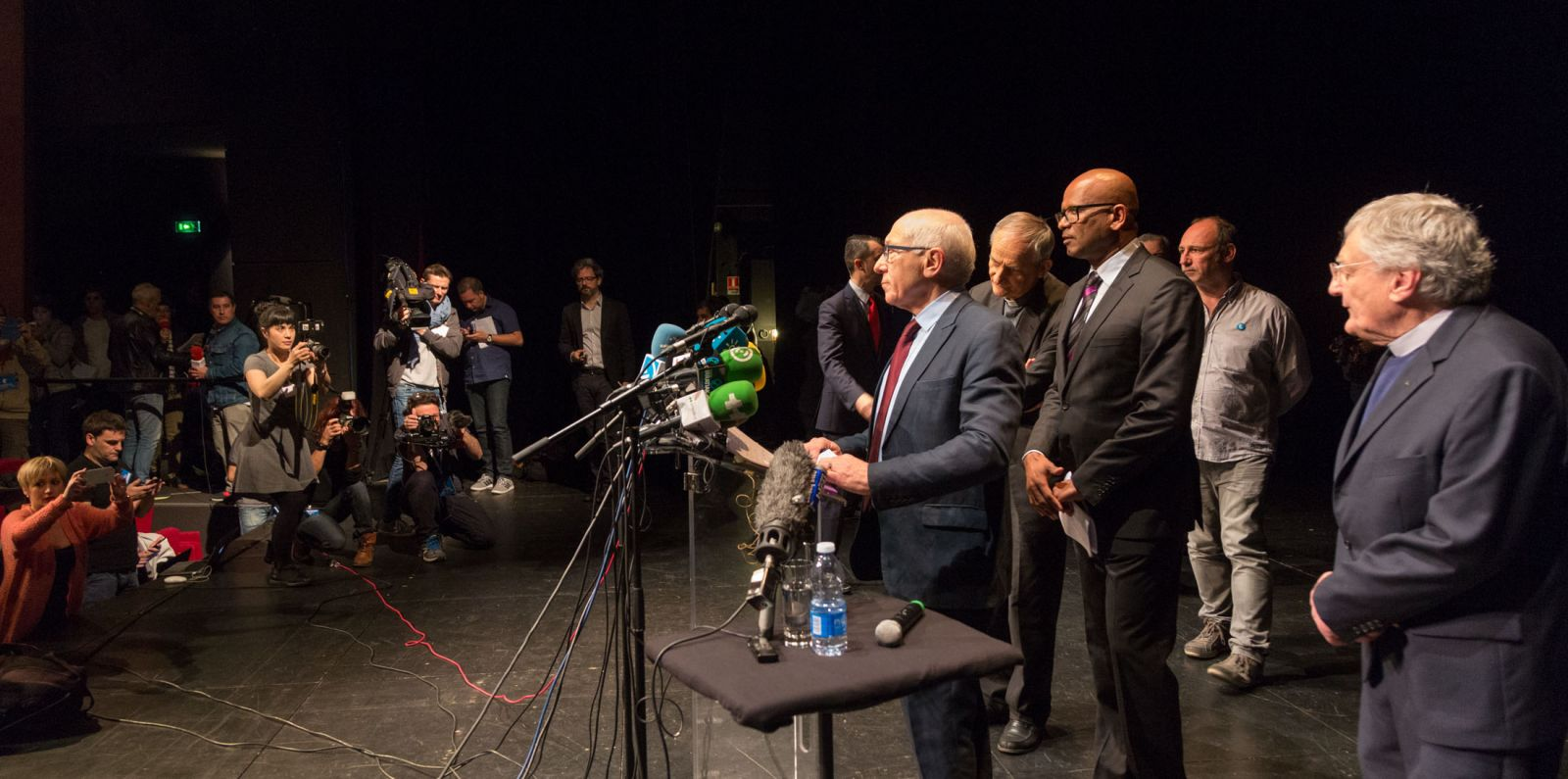
Press conference in Baiona, April 8th, 2017

Artisans of Peace (French: Artisans de la paix, Basque: Bakearen artisauak) is a group of civilian activists and union members from the Northern Basque Country in France, who came to prominence during 2016 and 2017 when they worked as peace brokers in order to obtain the disarmament of the separatist group ETA through disobedience with the French government.

In December 2016 five activists were arrested and released four days later. Their activism comes in the aftermath of ETA's 2011 permanent ceasefire and its announced disarmament. Thanks to their work, on 8 April 2017 ETA pinpointed the position of their remaining arm caches located across the western Pyrenees, and were in turn confiscated by the police in presence of the Artisans of Peace.

== The Artisans of Peace ==
The members are well known personalities from previous work as activists in environmental, social and labour movements. The six following people listed were the first coming to be known as the 'Artisans of Peace' in the Basque Country:

- Jean Noel Etcheverry (Txetx Etxeberri): Ecologist and activist in Demo and Bizi activist organizations.
- Mixel Berhokoirigoin: Former president of the Euskal Herriko Laborantza Ganbera (EHLG, it can be translated as 'Chamber of Agriculture of the Basque Country').
- Michel Tubiana: Honorary president of the League of Human Rights in France.
- Beatrice Molle-Haran: Journalist at Mediabask and Radio Euskadi.
- Stephane Etxegarai: Freelance cameraman.
- Mixel Bergouignan: Winegrower from Baigorri.

All of them were arrested on 16 December 2016 at Louhossoa/Luhuso, except for Michel Tubiana, since he happened to be absent that day.

== 2011-2016: Ceasefire of ETA with hidden weapons ==
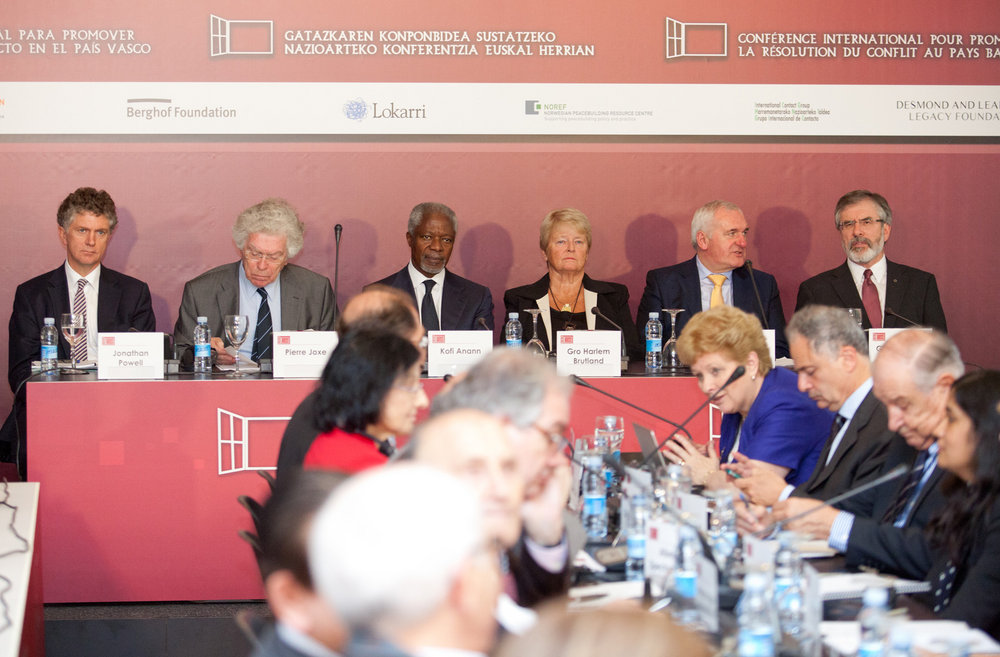
In Donostia-San Sebastián International Peace Conference, from left to right: Jonathan Powell, Pierre Joxe, Kofi Annan, Gro Harlem Brundtland, Bertie Ahern eta Gerry Adams.

On 5 September 2010, ETA declared a new ceasefire. One year later, on 17 October 2011, six international leaders, including Kofi Annan, Jonathan Powell, Bertie Ahern, Gro Harlem Brundtland, Pierre Joxe and Gerry Adams, presented a road map for the resolution of the armed conflict in the Basque Country. Finally ETA three days later, on 20 October, they announced a "permanent cessation of its armed activity". Since then the disarmament of ETA has become a common objective for Basque society.

During the next five years ETA gave several steps towards its disarmament; in February 2014 a small quantity of weapons were delivered to the international committee of verification. ETA declared in July 2014 that they had dismantled their military structure. All these steps were always carried out unilaterally, without any agreement with the Spanish or French governments. During these years, these governments continued to arrest ETA activists, including in several cases those members of the internal structure of ETA responsible for the disarmament.

Faced with this impasse, three civil society figures in the Northern Basque Country contacted with ETA, and offered themselves to carry out the process of decommissioning.

== 2016: Artisans of Peace arrested ==
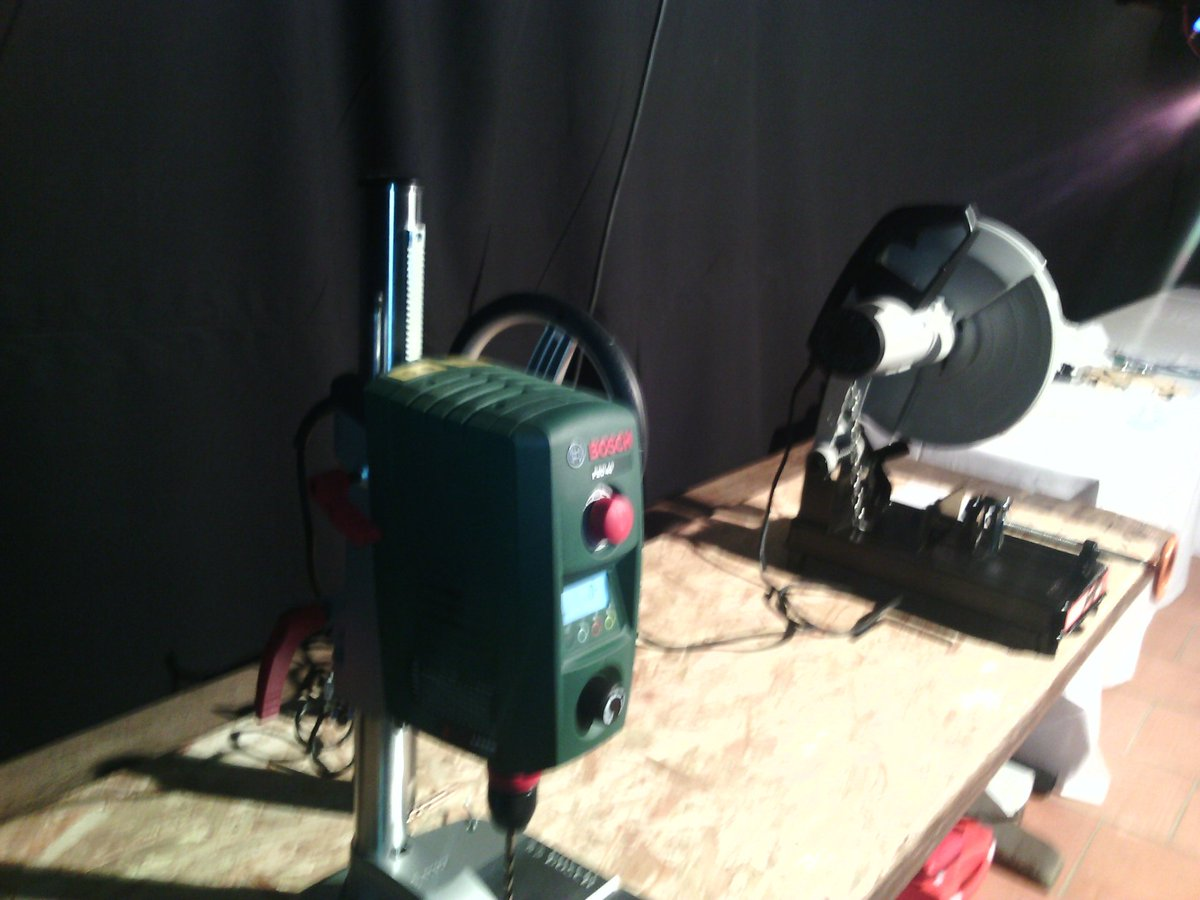
The workshop the Artisans of Peace prepared in the village of Louhossoa/Luhuso to destroy ETA weapons (2016-12-16)

The incipient decommissioning process was thwarted on 16 December 2016, at Louhossoa/Luhuso, when five civilian activists were preparing the deactivation of an important quantity of weapons, about the 15% of ETA's arsenal, and were arrested. Attorneys of the arrested denounced that they were being subject to a 'political manoeuvre' to foil a peace initiative, as well as claiming that they actually planned to neutralize the weapons in order to hand them over to the authorities.

The police operation ignited protests by thousands who took to the streets of Bayonne, Louhossoa/Luhuso, Saint-Jean-de-Luz/Donibane-Lohizune and Saint-Jean-Pied-de-Port/Donibane-Garazi to show their support to the activists in demonstrations spareheaded in Bayonne by Jean-René Etchegaray, president of the Basque Municipal Community, flanked by other 20 MPs, a senator, and local councillors; they declared their "unswerving commitment to peace". On 23 December, more than 600 elected representatives of the Northern Basque Country (right-wing, left-wing, ecologist, Basque nationalists, etc.) demanded the French government «to get involved in the disarmament process and in the global resolution». It was during those days that the media started to mention the name 'Artisans of Peace'.

This headline can summarize the common feeling shared by many citizens in Northern Basque Country: Kafka in the land of the Basques: five arrested for destroying ETA's arsenal. Four days later, the judge left them free, imposing certain constraints such as not meeting each other, or the obligation to remain in France. Regardless, three months later, the peaceworkers along with dozens of new activists who had joined them unveiled via Le Monde newspaper from Paris a scheduled surrender of its arms caches due on 8 April.

== 2017: Disarmament in the presence of activists ==
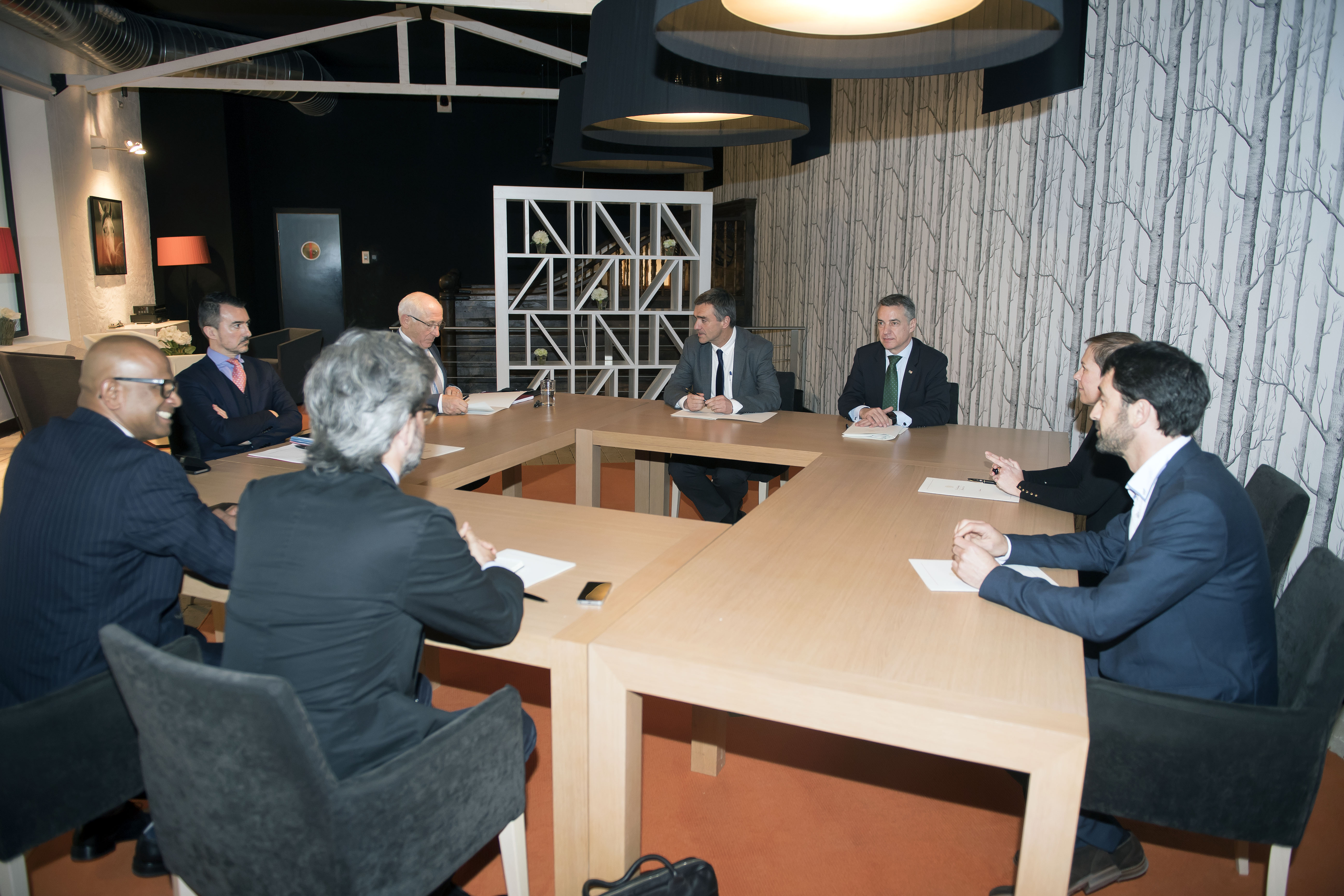
Tripartite meeting of the three main Basque institutional representatives with peace broker Ram Manikkalingam

On 8 April 2017, ETA revealed details of weapons dumps to The Guardian and to French police via the Artisans of Peace, and ETA became a disarmed organization. The International Verification Commission (IVC), established on 28 September 2011 to verify ETA's declaration of a permanent end of violence, after six years, received from Jean-Noël Etcheverry, an artisan of peace, information regarding the location of ETA’s weapons, ammunition and explosives. This information was immediately conveyed to the relevant French authorities. The Commission believed that this step constitutes the disarmament of ETA. On the night of the 8 April, ETA became a completely disarmed organization.

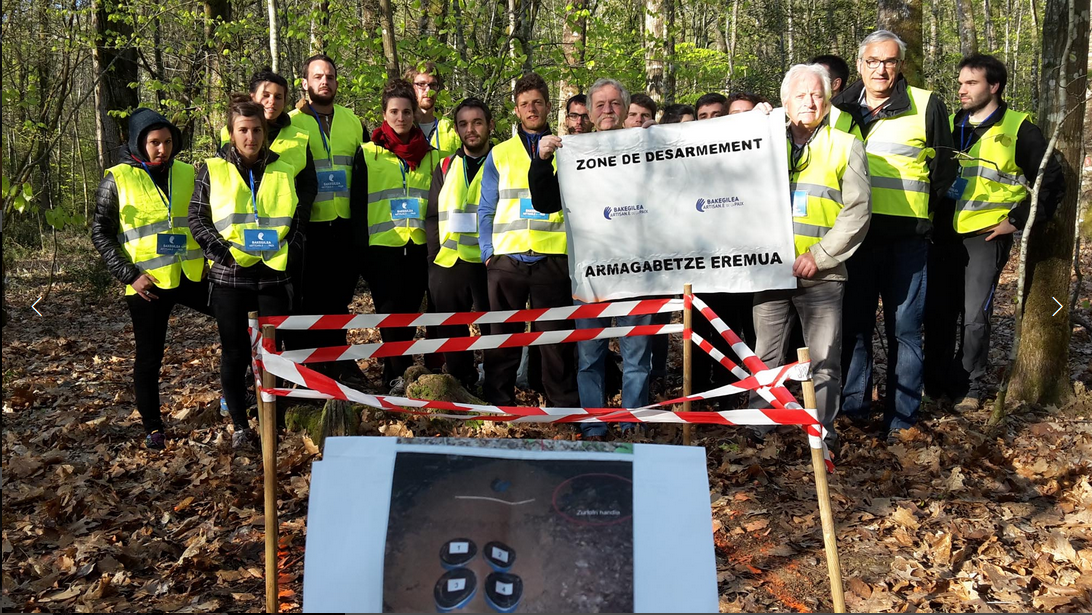
Some of "the Artisans of Peace" waiting for the French Police to arrive to one of the weapons dumps (2017-04-08)

Waiting for the French Police to arrive to all the weapons dumps, 172 new artisans remained next to caches as custodians and observers, even though that work a priori was not strictly correct from the point of view of law. The week ahead of the deadline was full of expectations, contacts, public statements and debate programs in the media. On 8 April, the civil society turned out to the streets in support of ETA’s decision to hand over arms and celebrate peace, with thousands of people attending a mass rally in central Bayonne. Some days before, a secret tripartite meeting was held reuniting the three chief Basque institutional representatives and peace broker Ram Manikkalingam.

== See also ==
- Donostia-San Sebastián International Peace Conference
- International Contact Group (Basque politics)
- International Verification Commission (Basque Country)
- Brian Currin
- Basque Country
- Spain
- France
