= John Blelloch =

Sir John Niall Henderson Blelloch KCB (24 October 1930 – 1 August 2017) was a British civil servant who was Permanent Under Secretary of State at the Northern Ireland Office from 1988 to 1990.

Blelloch was born in Edinburgh on 24 October 1930, and was educated at Fettes College in Edinburgh and Gonville and Caius College, Cambridge. He graduated in 1954 and joined the Civil Service as Assistant Principal Officer at the War Office. He then served as Private Secretary to two Parliamentary Under-Secretaries, and in 1958 was promoted to Principal Officer. In 1968, he was promoted to Assistant Secretary in the Ministry of Defence, and in 1976 to Assistant Under-Secretary of State at the Ministry of Defence, working on matters of national security.

He served as a Deputy Secretary in the Northern Ireland Office Office from 1980 to 1982, while resident in Northern Ireland. He held the posts of Deputy Secretary (Policy) and then Second Permanent Under Secretary at the MOD between 1982 and 1988 when he took up his post as Permanent Under Secretary of State at the Northern Ireland Office, an appointment he held until 1990.

From 1998, he was the co-chair of the Northern Ireland Sentence Review Commission, along with Brian Currin. He was Vice-Chairman of The Automobile Association and held a number of other appointments on government committees and with voluntary organisations.

== Death ==
Sir John Blelloch died on 1 August 2017, aged 86.

== Sources ==
- Blelloch, Sir John (Niall Henderson), Who's Who 2014, A & C Black, 2014; online edn, Oxford University Press, 2014

Government offices
Preceded by Sir Ewen Broadbent	Second Permanent Secretary of the Ministry of Defence; 1984–1988	Succeeded by Sir Kenneth Macdonald
