= Enrique Casas =

Enrique Casas may refer to:

- Enrique Casas García (fl. 1950s), Chilean politician
- Enrique Casas Vila (1943–1984), Spanish politician assassinated by the Comandos Autónomos Anticapitalistas
- Enrique Casas (footballer), managed Real Oviedo
