= List of films about the Basque conflict =

Below is an incomplete list of feature films, television films or television series which include events of the Basque conflict. This list does not include documentaries, short films.

== 1970s ==
Year	Country	Main title (Alternative title)	Original title (Original script)	Director	Subject
1977	Spain	Txikia Command: Death of a president	Comando Txikia: Muerte de un presidente	José Luis Madrid	Drama. Assassination of Luis Carrero Blanco
1979	Italy; Spain	Ogro	Operación Ogro	Gillo Pontecorvo	Drama, Thriller. Assassination of Luis Carrero Blanco

== 1980s ==
Year	Country	Main title (Alternative title)	Original title (Original script)	Director	Subject
1981	Spain	The escape from Segovia	La fuga de Segovia	Imanol Uribe	Crime, Drama. Segovia prison break
1983	Spain	Overdose	El pico	Eloy de la Iglesia	Drama.
1983	Spain	The reporters	Erreporteroak	Iñaki Aizpuru Zubitur	
1984	Spain	The Death of Mikel	La Muerte de Mikel	Imanol Uribe	Crime, Drama.
1984	Spain; Mexico	Goma-2		José Antonio de la Loma	Action, Drama.
1984	Spain	The Almería Case	El caso Almería	Pedro Costa Musté	Drama.
1985	Spain	Bay of Biscay	Golfo de Vizcaya	Javier Rebollo	
1985	Spain	A hundred meters	Ehun metro	Alfonso Ungría	
1987	Spain	The Russian	La rusa	Mario Camus	Thriller.
1987	Spain	The love of now	El amor de ahora	Ernesto del Río	Drama, Romance.
1989	Spain	Process to ETA	Proceso a ETA	Manuel Macià	
1989	Spain	The White Dove	La blanca paloma	Juan Miñón	Action, Drama, Romance.
1989	Spain	Ander and Yul	Ander y Yul	Ana Díez	Comedy, Drama.

== 1990s ==
Year	Country	Main title (Alternative title)	Original title (Original script)	Director	Subject
1990	Spain	Days between smoke	Ke arteko egunak	Antonio Eceiza	
1991	Spain	How to lift 1000 kilos	Cómo levantar 1000 kilos	Antonio Hernández	Comedy, Crime.
1991	Spain	Anything for Bread	Todo por la pasta	Enrique Urbizu	Action, Adventure, Crime, Thriller.
1991	Spain	The Longest Night	La noche más larga	José Luis García Sánchez	Drama, War.
1992	Spain	Love in off	Amor en off	Koldo Izaguirre	
1993	Spain	Shadows in a Conflict	Sombras en una batalla	Mario Camus	Drama, Thriller.
1994	Spain	Running Out of Time	Días contados	Imanol Uribe	Crime, Drama, Thriller.
1997	Spain	Blinded	A ciegas	Daniel Calparsoro	Action, Adventure, Crime, Romance, Thriller.

== 2000s ==
Year	Country	Main title (Alternative title)	Original title (Original script)	Director	Subject
2000	Spain	Arian's journey	El viaje de Arián	Eduard Bosch	Drama, Thriller, Action.
2000	Spain	Yoyes		Helena Taberna	Drama.
2001	Spain	His Master's Voice	La voz de su amo	Emilio Martínez-Lázaro	Crime, Drama.
2001	Chile		Antonia	Mariano Andrade	Drama.
2002	Spain	The greyhound beach	La playa de los galgos	Mario Camus	Drama.
2006	Spain	We are all invited	Todos estamos invitados	Manuel Gutiérrez Aragón	Drama, Romance, Thriller.
2006	Spain	GAL		Miguel Courtois	Drama, Thriller.
2007	Spain	Clandestine	Clandestinos	Antonio Hens	Crime, Drama, Romance.
2008	Spain; France	Bullet in the Head	Tiro en la cabeza	Jaime Rosales	Drama.
2008	Mexico	Every day is yours	Todos los días son tuyos	José Luis Gutiérrez Arias	Mystery, Thriller.
2009	Spain	Hot Moon	Luna caliente	Vicente Aranda	Drama, Thriller.
2009	Spain; France	Cell 211	Celda 211	Daniel Monzón	Action, Crime, Drama, Thriller.
2009	Spain	Perfect happiness	Zorion perfektua	Jabi Elortegi	Drama.
2009	Spain	My father's house	La casa de mi padre	Gorka Merchán	Drama.

== 2010s ==
Year	Country	Main title (Alternative title)	Original title (Original script)	Director	Subject
2012	Spain	Dragon Hunter	Dragoi Ehiztaria	Patxi Barko	Drama.
2014	Spain	Fire	Fuego	Luis Marías	
2014	Spain	Relaxed and spacious	Lasa eta Zabala	Pablo Malo	Thriller. Killing of Lasa and Zabala
2014	Spain	Deal maker	Negociador	Borja Cobeaga	Comedy, Drama.
2015	Spain	Far from the sea	Lejos del mar	Imanol Uribe	Drama, Thriller.
2016	Spain	249. The night an intern found Emiliano Revilla	249. La noche en que una becaria encontró a Emiliano Revilla	Luis María Ferrández	Drama. Kidnapping of Emiliano Revilla
2017	Spain	Bomb Scared	Fe de etarras	Borja Cobeaga	Comedy.
2018	Spain; Argentina	When you stop loving me	Cuando dejes de quererme	Igor Legarreta	Crime, Drama, Mystery, Thriller.
2018	Spain	The accordionist's son	El hijo del acordeonista	Fernando Bernués	Drama.

== 2020s ==
Year	Country	Main title (Alternative title)	Original title (Original script)	Director	Subject
2020	Spain	Ane Is Missing	Ane	David Pérez Sañudo	Drama.
2021	Spain	Maixabel		Icíar Bollaín	Biography, Crime, Drama, Thriller.
2021	Spain	Once Upon a Time in Euskadi	Érase una vez en Euskadi	Manu Gómez	Drama.
2022	Spain	The diner	El comensal	Ángeles González-Sinde	Drama.
2023	Spain	The approaching winter	Negu Hurbilak	Ekain Albite; Mikel Ibarguren; Nicolau Mallofré; Adrià Roca	Drama.
2024	Spain	Undercover	La infiltrada	Arantxa Echevarría	Thriller. Aranzazu Berradre Marín, Comando Donosti
2025	Spain	She Walks in Darkness	Un fantasma en la batalla	Agustín Díaz Yanes	Drama, History, Thriller.
2027	Spain	Blanco		Félix Viscarret	Drama, History. Miguel Ángel Blanco

== Science fiction, fantasy and horror ==
Year	Country	Main title (Alternative title)	Original title (Original script)	Director	Subject
2004	Spain	The Wolf	El Lobo	Miguel Courtois	Action, Adventure, Crime, Drama, Horror, Thriller. Mikel Lejarza

== Television films ==
Year	Country	Main title (Alternative title)	Original title (Original script)	Director	Subject
2005	Spain	Those Skies	Zeru Horiek	Aizpea Goenaga	Drama.
2009	Spain	A bullet for the King	Una bala para el Rey	Pablo Barrera	Thriller
2011	Spain	Tarancón, the fifth commandment	Tarancón, el quinto mandamiento	Antonio Hernández	Drama.
2013	Spain	Orphans	Umezurtzak	Ernesto del Río	Drama, Family, History.
2014	Spain	Hello Joshua	Aupa Josu	Borja Cobeaga	Comedy.
2015	France; Spain	Sanctuary	Sanctuaire	Olivier Masset-Depasse	Drama, History, Thriller.

== Television series ==
Year	Country	Main title (Alternative title)	Original title (Original script)	Director	Subject
2008	Spain	Future: 48 hours	Futuro: 48 horas	Manuel Estudillo	Drama, Thriller.
2011	Spain	The murder of Carrero Blanco	El asesinato de Carrero Blanco	Miguel Bardem	History. Assassination of Luis Carrero Blanco
2011	Spain	The price of freedom	El precio de la libertad	Ana Murugarren	Drama, Thriller. Mario Onaindia
2016	Spain	Cain's father	El padre de Caín	Salvador Calvo	Drama.
2018	Spain	Alleged guilty	Presunto culpable		Thriller.
2020	Spain	The invisible line	La línea invisible	Mariano Barroso	Drama, History.
2020	Spain	Patria		Félix Viscarret; Óscar Pedraza	Drama.
2021	Spain	Parot		Gustavo Ron; Rafael Montesinos	Crime, Mystery, Thriller.
2024	Spain	The Executioners	Verdugos	Daniel Guzmán; Andrea Jaurrieta	Thriller, Drama.
2025	Spain	The Border	La frontera	María Pulido; Yolanda Centeno	Action, Drama, Thriller.
