= Ronald Noble =

American law enforcement officer

Ronald K. Noble
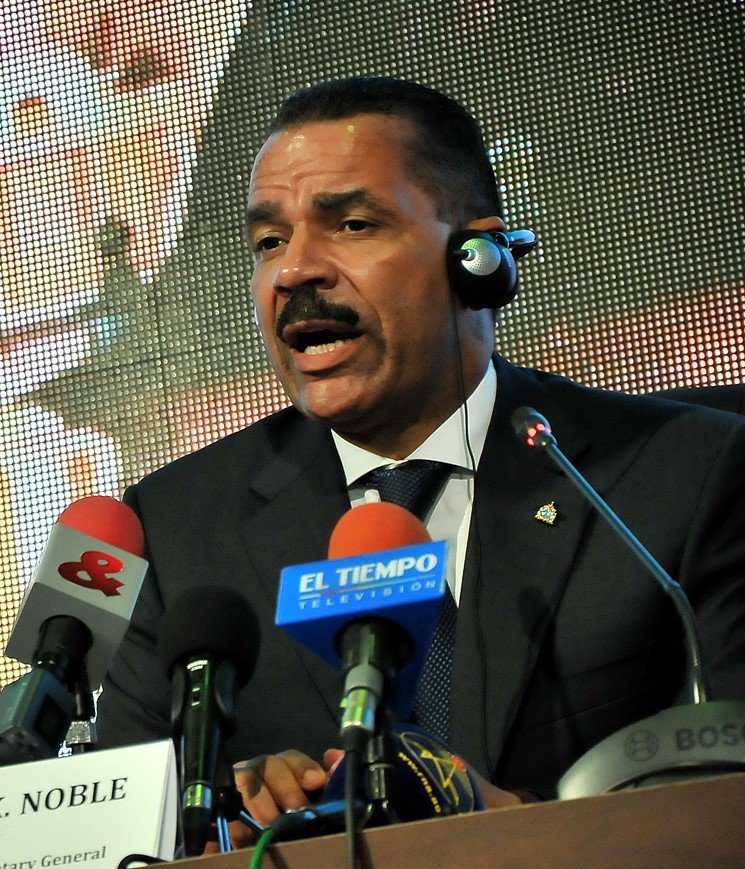

Secretary General of Interpol
- In office 3 November 2000 – 7 November 2014
- President: Jesús Espigares Mira; Jackie Selebi; Arturo Herrera Verdugo (Acting); Khoo Boon Hui; Mireille Ballestrazzi
- Preceded by: Raymond Kendall
- Succeeded by: Jürgen Stock

Personal details
- Born: Ronald Kenneth Noble; September 24, 1956 (age 70) Fort Dix, New Jersey, U.S.
- Party: Democratic
- Education: University of New Hampshire, Durham (BA); Stanford University (JD)
- Awards: Darjah Utama Bakti Cemerlang; Hilal-e-Pakistan; Order of St. Gregory the Great; Chevalier of the Legion of Honour

Ronald K. Noble (born September 24, 1956) is an American law enforcement officer who served as the secretary-general of the International Criminal Police Organization (Interpol) from 2000 to 2014. He was the organization's first American and youngest secretary-general at the time of his appointment. Noble previously worked as a public servant in various U.S. government agencies, including the District Court for the Eastern District of Pennsylvania, the Department of Justice and the Treasury.

== Early life and education ==
Noble was born in Fort Dix, a United States Army post south-east of Trenton, New Jersey, to an African-American father and a German mother. He was raised in nearby Jobstown, where his father worked as a janitor after serving as a master sergeant in the army. Noble attended Northern Burlington County Regional High School before graduating from the University of New Hampshire in 1979 with a bachelor's degree in economics and business administration. He later attended Stanford Law School, serving as an editor on the Stanford Law Review and graduating cum laude in 1982.

== Career ==
Noble began his career as a law clerk for A. Leon Higginbotham Jr., a judge at the United States Court of Appeals for the Third Circuit, who persuaded him to enter public service. In 1984, he became an assistant U.S. Attorney for the Eastern District of Pennsylvania under Edward S. G. Dennis. He then moved to the Department of Justice in Washington, D.C. in 1988 to work as a deputy assistant Attorney General and chief of staff for Dennis, who had been appointed the assistant Attorney General for the Criminal Division.

In 1993, Noble was appointed the Under Secretary of the Treasury for Enforcement, being placed in charge of the Secret Service, the Bureau of Alcohol, Tobacco, and Firearms (ATF), the Customs Service Office of Enforcement, the Federal Law Enforcement Training Center, the Office of Foreign Assets Control and the Financial Crimes Enforcement Network. He was head of the department's "Waco Administrative Review Team", which produced a report on the ATF's actions against the Branch Davidians, leading to the Waco siege.

In 1994, following a plane crash on the south lawn of the White House carried out by Frank Eugene Corder, Secretary of the Treasury Lloyd Bentsen directed Under Secretary Noble and Secret Service director Eljay B. Bowron to conduct an investigation into the circumstances leading to the crash. In 1995, a public report of the White House Security Review was published; President Bill Clinton accepted all of its recommendations and announced the closure of the portion of Pennsylvania Avenue in front of the White House on May 21, 1995, restricting movement to pedestrian traffic to eliminate the threat of car bomb or truck bomb attacks.

In 1996, Noble returned to New York University School of Law to continue working as a tenured professor. In 1998, he participated as a witness for the defense during the trial for the impeachment of Clinton.

=== Interpol ===
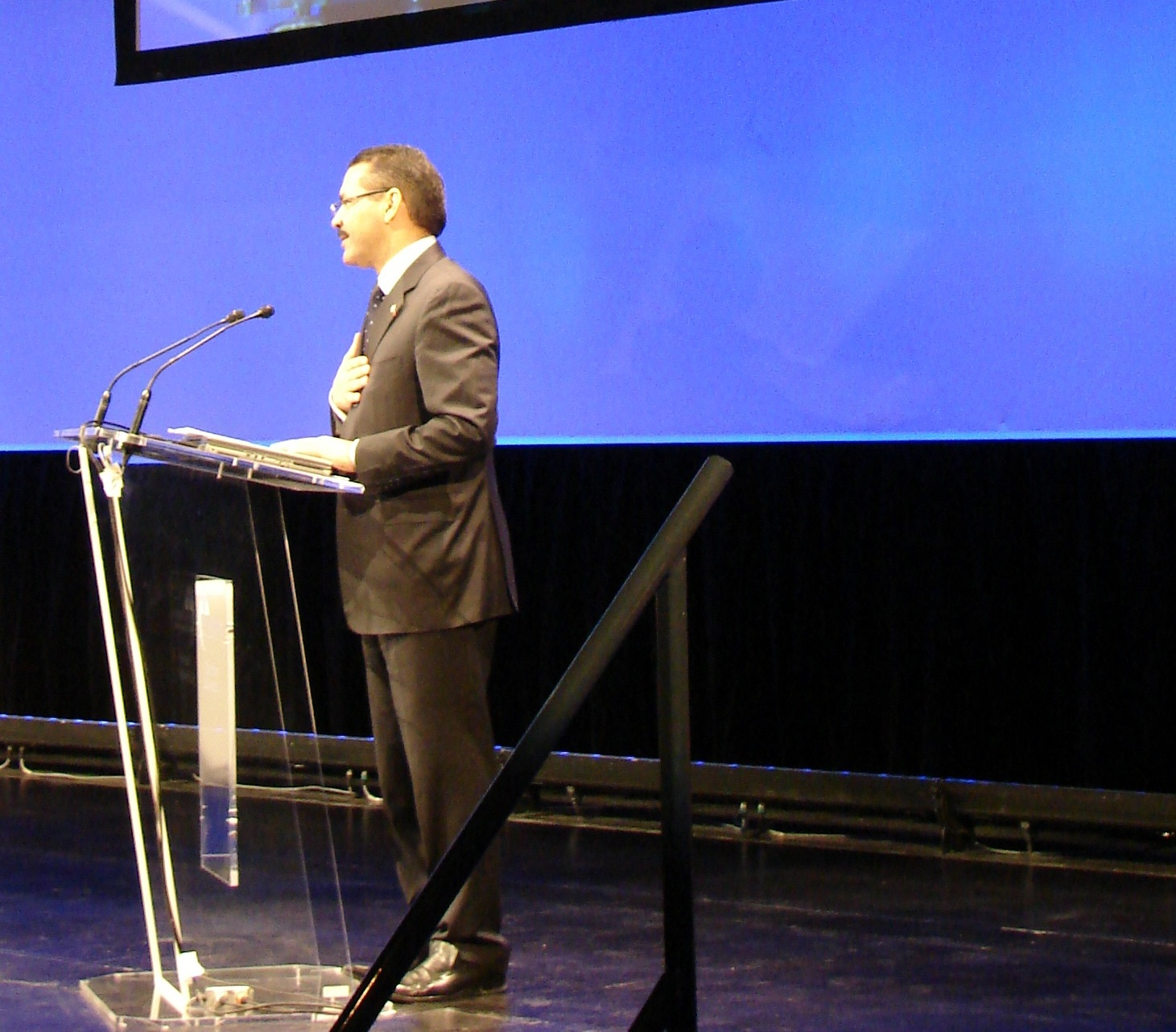
Noble at the 6th Global Congress about combating piracy and counterfeiting in 2011

In 1998, with the support of Attorney General Janet Reno and FBI director Louis Freeh, Noble applied to become the secretary-general of Interpol and succeed incumbent Raymond Kendall. Noble was nominated for the post by the organization's Executive Committee the previous year, and on September 20, 2005, during Interpol's 74th General Assembly in Berlin, he was re-elected for a second five-year term. On November 9, 2010, Noble was re-elected for a third term as secretary-general during the organization's 79th General Assembly in Doha, Qatar. On November 7, 2014, he resigned from the role and was succeeded by Jürgen Stock, who was unanimously elected during Interpol's 83rd General Assembly in Monaco.

Noble's endorsement of the Belarusian state investigation into the April 2011 bomb explosion in the Minsk Metro was questioned in 2012 in a BBC documentary by journalist John Sweeney about torture in the 21st century. Following Belarusian dictator Alexander Lukashenko's announcement in April of the suspects' arrests and vowing that they would be shot, and pre-empting their eventual trial by several months, Noble held a May 11 press conference in Minsk, praising the "high professionalism" of the police, Ministry of Internal Affairs officials, and other government officials for the KGB-led investigation's quick completion. According to Sweeney, Noble endorsed the CCTV footage used in the investigation, the credibility of which was later questioned. The BBC reported that the suspects were severely beaten to extract a confession prior to their trial. Responding to the BBC following the suspects' executions, Noble defended the professionalism of the investigation and accused the BBC of "advancing one-sided false claims" that would "undermine public confidence in the media"; Interpol said the BBC documentary was based on "biased speculation".

In December 2017, an Argentine judge alleged that while at Interpol, Noble along with former Argentine President Cristina Fernandez de Kirchner had been involved in a cover-up of Argentina's alleged attempt to cancel INTERPOL Red Notices that had been issued against former Iranian government officials for the July 1994 terrorist attack of the AMIA Jewish center in Buenos Aires. Noble refuted the claim of a cover-up, calling the judge's report "false, misleading and incomplete".

=== Security consultancy ===
After leaving Interpol, Noble founded a multinational security consultancy firm called RKN Global DWC LLC, which is headquartered in Dubai, UAE. In February 2016, the firm announced plans to build a security printing plant in Banská Bystrica, Slovakia, a project that would have invested €89 million in the country and employed up to 1,200 people, paired with a subsidy of €18 million from the Government of Slovakia. However, in June 2016 however, the firm withdrew the plans following political opposition to the project and uncertainty created by the UK's decision to leave the EU.

== Personal life ==
Noble is married and has one son. As well as English, he speaks French, Spanish and German.

== Honors ==
Awards

- United States Department of the Treasury, Alexander Hamilton Award: 1996
- New York University, Great Teacher Award: 1998
- President's Medal of Distinction (Cameroon): 2009
- Ellis Island Medal of Honor: 2016

Orders, decorations and medals

- Chevalier (Knight) of the Legion of Honour
- Hilal-e-Pakistan (Crescent of Pakistan)
- Knight Commander with Star of the Order of St. Gregory the Great
- Darjah Utama Bakti Cemerlang (Distinguished Service Order)
- Grand Officer, Military Medal of the Ministry of National Defense (Colombia)

Diplomatic posts
Preceded by Raymond Kendall	Secretary General of Interpol; 2000–2014	Succeeded by Jürgen Stock
