= Iparretarrak =

Basque nationalist paramilitary organization

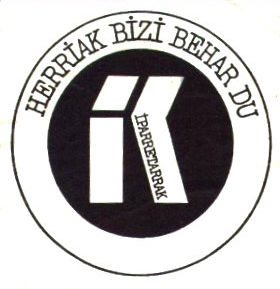
Logo

Iparretarrak (meaning "the Northerners" in Basque), commonly known as IK, was a Basque nationalist and revolutionary socialist paramilitary organization operating in the French or Northern Basque Country, founded in 1973 by Philippe Bidart and other Basque activists. 1982 was their most active year, with 32 attacks. IK mostly targeted tourist developments but also assassinated a number of French police personnel. In 1984, they attacked the Biarritz airport before the arrival of the French president François Mitterrand, who was accused by IK of "not respecting the Basque culture and national rights".

Despite sharing the same goals and methods, it held an uneasy relation with ETA, a more powerful organization based in the Southern Basque Country, mostly because ETA has used the French Basque Country as a safe haven and did not want to provoke the French Government in this regard.

In 1998 it declared a unilateral truce, which broke when in 2000 it attacked a police station in Lecumberry and a tourism site in Bayonne. To date, it has not claimed any more actions, but another group, Irrintzi (probably numbering no more than one cell), followed IK's path in the French Basque Country by starting an on-off campaign against tourist targets.

In 2007 Philippe Bidart, the leader and founder of IK, was set free after serving a prison term since 1988.

== See also ==
- Politics of France
- Terrorism in France

== Bibliography ==
- Iparretarrak Histoire d'une organisation politique armée, Eneko Bidegain, 2007, Gatuzain, ISBN 978-2-913842-55-7.
