= Raymond Kendall =

Raymond Edward Kendall

6th Secretary-General of Interpol
- In office October 1985 – October 2000
- Preceded by: André Bossard
- Succeeded by: Ronald Noble

Raymond Edward Kendall, QPM (born 5 October 1933), is a British law enforcement officer and former Interpol Secretary-General.

== Biography ==
Kendall commenced military service in the Royal Air Force in 1951, serving in the Federation of Malaya (now part of Malaysia). He joined the Metropolitan Police in 1962, spending most of his service in Special Branch and became Deputy Assistant Commissioner. In 1971, he joined ICPO-Interpol and became assistant director of drugs. In 1975, he was promoted to Director. He served three terms as Secretary-General of Interpol from 1985 until his retirement in 2001. He was elected in October 1985 at the 54th session of the General Assembly, Washington, D.C., and was re-elected in October 1990 at the 59th session of the General Assembly, Ottawa and again in October 1995 at the 64th session of the General Assembly, Beijing.

He was a member of the International Contact Group working with the Basque separatist group ETA to establish contacts with France and Spain. He is now Honorary Secretary General and Chairman of Brighterion.

He studied at the University of Oxford, graduating with an honours degree in modern languages and Master of Arts.
