= Mixel Berhokoirigoin =

French farmer and activist (1952–2021)

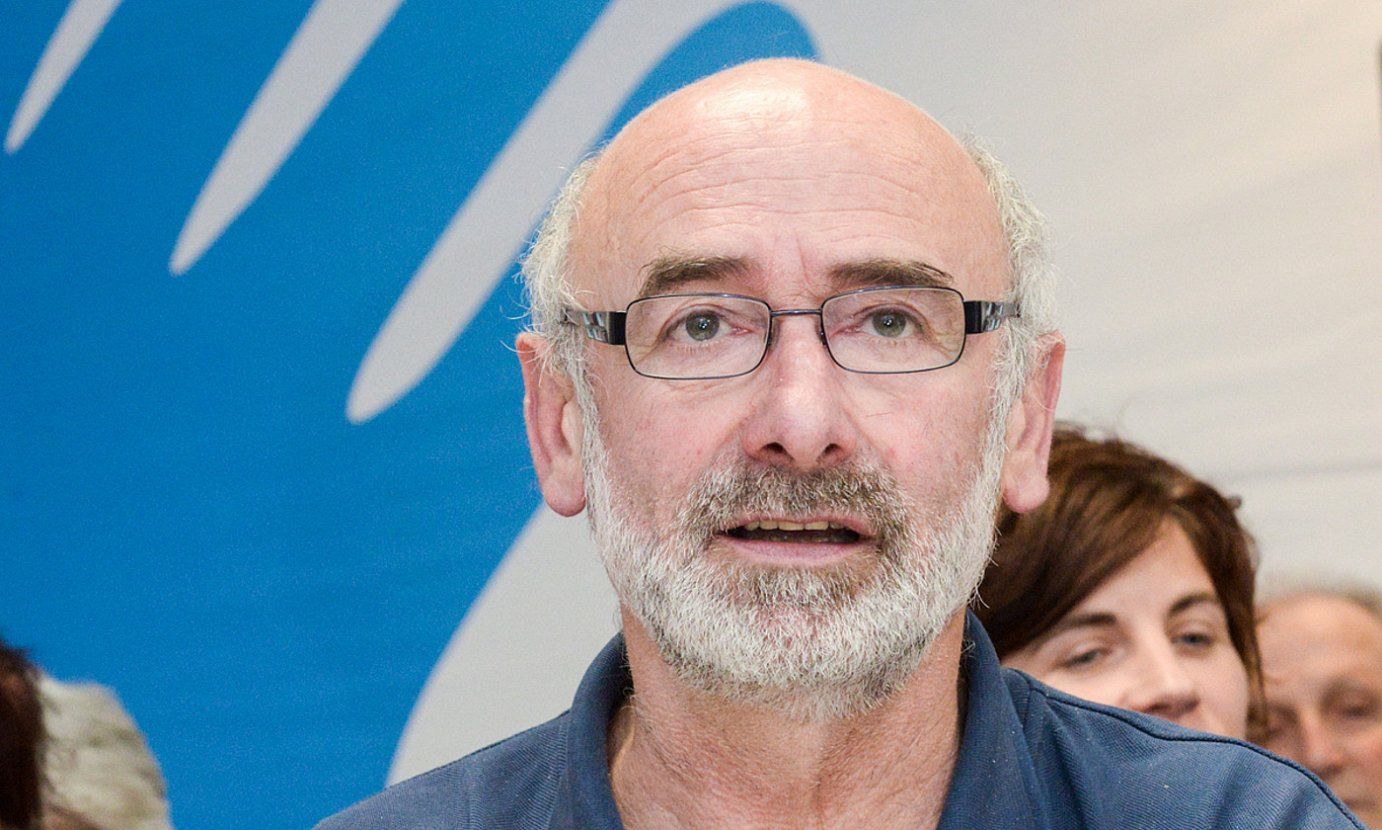
- Berhokoirigoin in 2017
- Born: August 16, 1952; Gamarthe, Basses-Pyrénées, Nouvelle-Aquitaine, France
- Died: May 7, 2021 (aged 68); Gamarthe, Pyrénées-Atlantiques, Nouvelle-Aquitaine, France
- Occupations: Farmer, activist

Mixel Berhokoirigoin (16 August 1952 – 7 May 2021) was a Basque farmer and activist. He was the spokesperson for the self-styled group "Artisans of Peace" that promoted an act of disarmament of ETA in the Basque-French town of Baiona. He was part of a delegation of dialogue with the French Government.

He was born in Gamarte.

Berhokoirigoin died on 7 May 2021 after fighting a "serious illness".

== Biography ==
A farmer by trade in his hometown of Gamarthe, Michel Berhocoirigoin became involved in the agricultural labor movement through the Catholic Agricultural Youth. In 1982, he helped found the union Euskal Herriko Laborarien Batasuna (ELB), a splinter group of the FDSEA with which he disagreed: breaking with the productivist model, ELB promotes environmentally friendly small-scale farming that supports the survival of small farms producing for local markets. Michel Berhocoirigoin was also active in the National Confederation of Farm Workers’ Unions, to which ELB was affiliated, and later in the Confédération Paysanne following its founding in 1987.
