= Elkarri =

- Successor: Lokarri
- Formation: 1992
- Dissolved: 2006

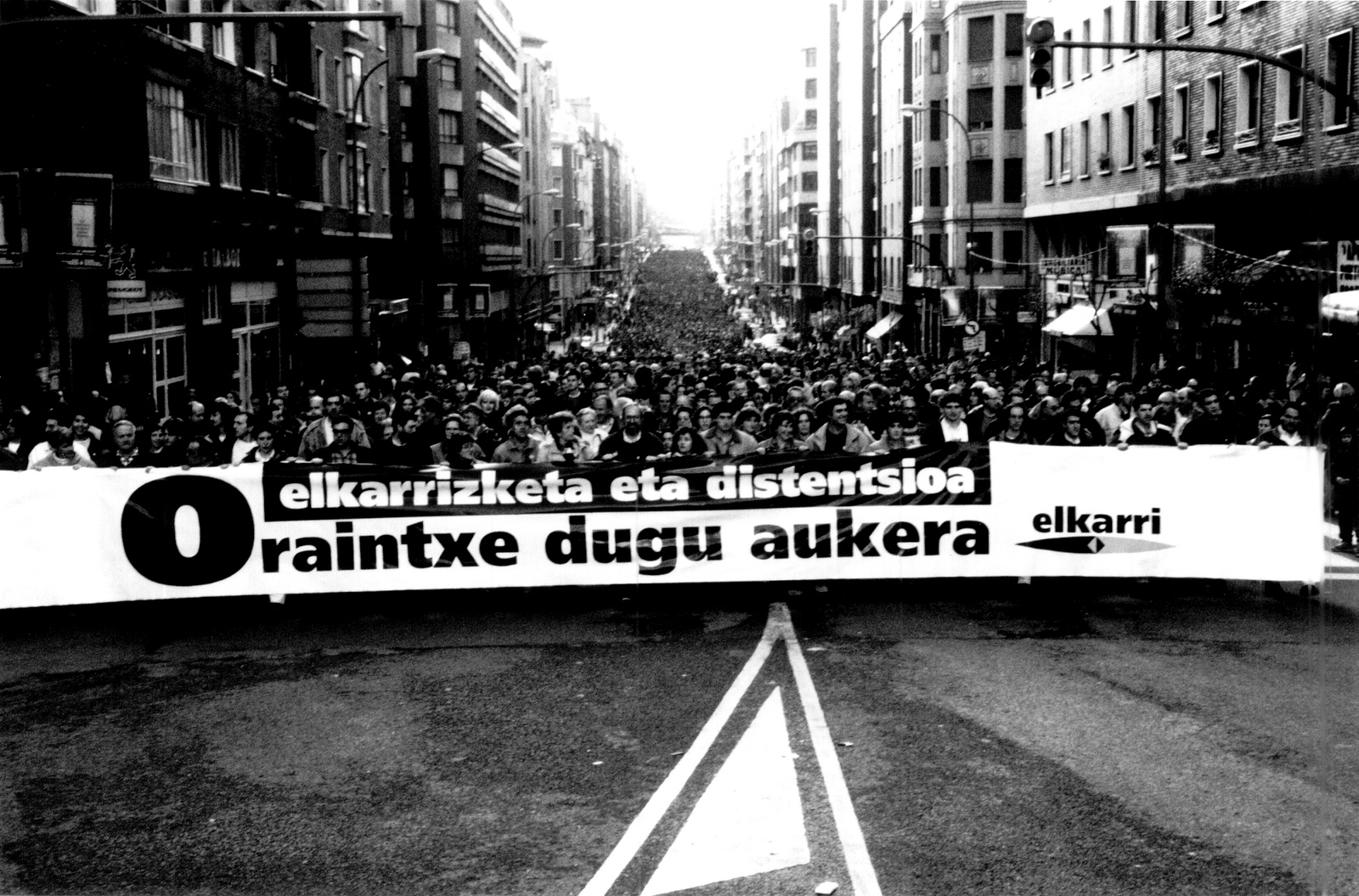
Elkarri banner at a 1994 protest in Bilbao

Elkarri (Basque: "One to the Other" or "Mutually") was an organization that sought a peaceful resolution of the Basque conflict.

== Background ==
Formed in 1992, its founders were members of the Basque National Liberation Movement who had become disillusioned with political violence. As its membership grew, it encompassed other political viewpoints, eventually moving towards the moderate nationalism of the Basque Nationalist Party and Eusko Alkartasuna. In 2000 Elkarri had about 2500 members and 13 full-time employees.

Elkarri argued that the Basque conflict had deep historical roots and could only be resolved through a political settlement between ETA and the Spanish government.

In 2006 Elkarri split into two organizations: Lokarri and Baketik. Lokarri organized the 2011 Donostia-San Sebastián International Peace Conference that led to ETA's "definitive cessation of its armed activity." It disbanded in 2015.

== See also ==
- Gesto por la Paz

== Sources ==
- Argomaniz, Javier. Civil Action Against ETA Terrorism in Basque Country in D. Avant, M. Berry, E. Chenoweth, R.A. Epstein, C. Hendrix, O. Kaplan and T. Sisk (eds.) Civil Action and the Dynamics of Violence (New York: Oxford University Press, 2019)
