= Sentence Review Commission =

The Sentence Review Commission was established by the Northern Ireland (Sentences) Act 1998 (c. 35) and was co-chaired by Brian Currin, a South African human rights lawyer, and Sir John Blelloch, a retired senior Northern Ireland Office civil servant. The Sentence Review Commissioners in Northern Ireland were appointed to oversee and regulate the early release of certain prisoners convicted during the period of civil unrest known as the Troubles. It was established by the Belfast Agreement which allowed for up to 500 loyalist and republican prisoners sentenced before 10 April 1998 to be released by 28 July 2000.

This decision to release prisoners without serving their full sentences provoked moral outrage. Many people, especially unionists were aggrieved at this part of the Agreement, although it was seen as necessary to appease the paramilitary organisations, namely the Provisional IRA, Ulster Volunteer Force and the Ulster Defence Association. To be eligible for early release, the prisoner had to be affiliated to a paramilitary organisation that had established, and maintained, "a complete and unequivocal cease-fire". The Sentence Review Commission decided which prisoners should be released early and whether any were a threat to society and could re-offend. Each prisoner was released on a licence that could be revoked if the Commissioners and Secretary of State for Northern Ireland decided that they had rejoined a paramilitary organisation or supported paramilitary activity.

The early release of prisoners is one of the most difficult parts of the Good Friday Agreement. The Northern Ireland (Sentences) Act provides the framework for releases and includes important safeguards for the protection of the public. It ensures that prisoners who support organisations that have not established, or are not maintaining complete and unequivocal ceasefires will not be released early.

— Dr. Mo Mowlam, July 1998

== List of commissioners ==
Current commissioners are:

- Clodagh McGrory (chairperson)
- Adrian Grounds
- Prof John Jackson
- Timothy Thorne
- Anne Grimes
- Micaela Greenwood

Previous commissioners were:

- Sir John Blelloch (Co-chairman)
- David Bolton (Resigned to deal with Omagh bombing, replaced by Dr Duncan Morrow)
- Silvia Casale
- Peter Curran
- Brian Currin (Co-chairman)
- Ian Dunbar
- Mary Gilpin
- Duncan Morrow (Appointed 9 September 1998)
- Donal McFerran (Appointed in October 2002)
- Dave Wall (1998-2000)
