= Gesto por la Paz =

Peace movement in Basque Country, Spain

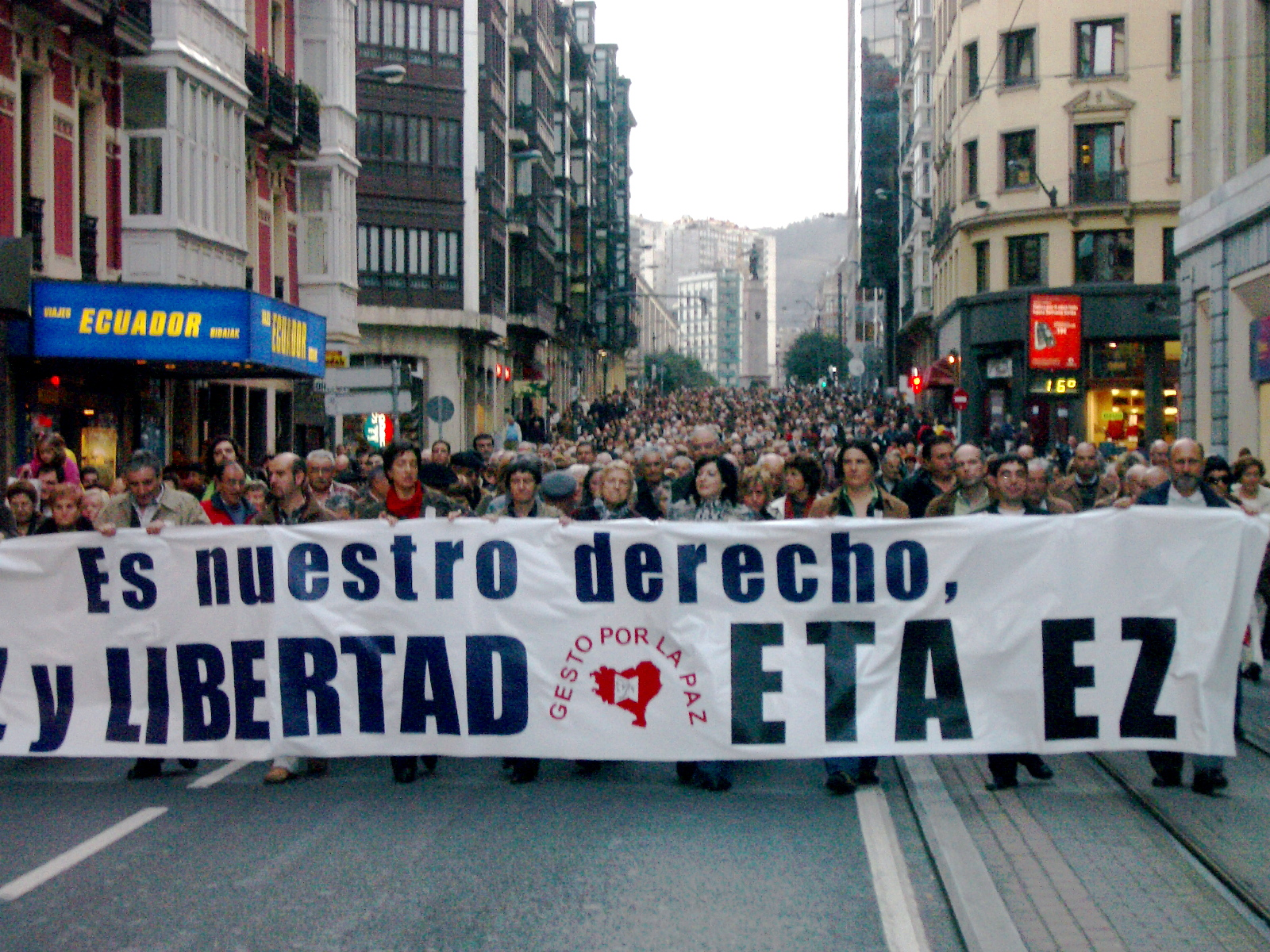
Gesto por la Paz banner at a 2007 march in Bilbao

Gesto por la Paz (Spanish: A Gesture for Peace) was a peace movement that was active in the Spanish Basque Country between 1985 and 2013. Gesto had its roots in an intitiave sponsored by the Catholic Church. It staged tens of thousands of protests over the course of its existence and had as many as 175 local chapters by the 1990s. Biscay was its stronghold. It included supporters from most of the Basque political parties, aside from Herri Batasuna and the People's Party of the Basque Country.

ETA was its main target, but it also protested against the use of extrajudicial violence and torture by the Spanish state. It also campaigned against the Spanish government's policy of dispersing ETA prisoners to prisons throughout the country, arguing that they should be housed closer to the Basque Country.

Gesto organized annual peace marches every January and 15-minute silent protests (Gestos) after incidents of political violence. These 15-minute protests were the most visible face of the organization. The first of these silent protests was held in Bilbao on November 26, 1985, after the killings of two Navy officers, Rafael Melchor García and José Manuel Ibarzabal. It was attended by around 200 people.

Gesto also held weekly protests during periods when ETA had kidnapped someone. A series of high-profile ETA kidnappings in the mid-1990s greatly increased Gesto's public profile. During that period Gesto was met by aggressive counter-protests from the Basque National Liberation Movement, sometimes pitting neighbors or family members against each other. Gesto also introduced the use of blue ribbons as an anti-violence symbol, which was adopted by many politicians. Gesto was awarded the Prince of Asturias Award for Concord in 1993.

Gesto disbanded in 2013, two years after ETA announced a permanent ceasefire.

== See also ==
- ¡Basta Ya!
- Elkarri

== Sources ==
- Argomaniz, Javier. Civil Action Against ETA Terrorism in Basque Country in D. Avant, M. Berry, E. Chenoweth, R.A. Epstein, C. Hendrix, O. Kaplan and T. Sisk (eds.) Civil Action and the Dynamics of Violence (New York: Oxford University Press, 2019)
