= Gamarthe =

Gamarthe Gamarte
- Commune
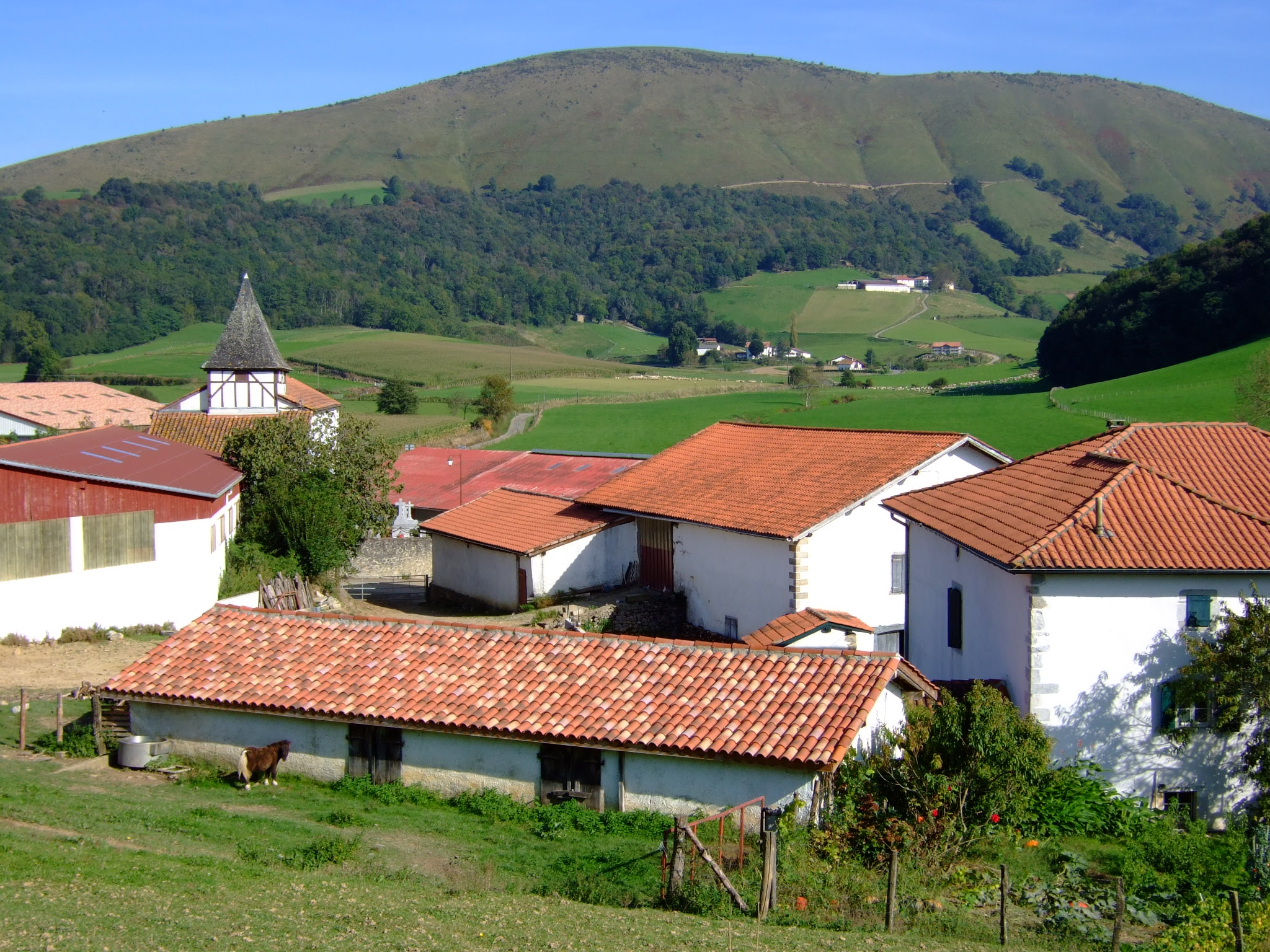
- The village of Gamarthe
- Location of Gamarthe
- Location within France Location within Nouvelle-Aquitaine
- Coordinates: 43°12′08″N 1°08′32″W
- Country: France
- Region: Nouvelle-Aquitaine
- Department: Pyrénées-Atlantiques
- Arrondissement: Bayonne
- Canton: Montagne Basque
- Intercommunality: CA Pays Basque

Government
  - Mayor (2020–2026): Jean-Michel Bicain
- Area^{1}: 9.91 km^{2} (3.83 sq mi)
- Elevation: 487 m (1,598 ft)
- Highest elevation: 642 m (2,106 ft)
- Lowest elevation: 196 m (643 ft)
- Population (2023): 125
  - Density: 12.6/km^{2} (32.7/sq mi)
- Time zone: UTC+01:00 (CET)
  - Summer (DST): UTC+02:00 (CEST)
- INSEE/Postal code: 64229 /64220
- ^{1} French Land Register data, which excludes lakes, ponds, glaciers > 1 km^{2} (0.386 sq mi or 247 acres) and river estuaries.

Gamarthe (French pronunciation: [ɡamaʁt]; Basque: Gamarte) is a commune in the Pyrénées-Atlantiques department in south-western France.

It is located in the former province of Lower Navarre.

== See also ==
- Communes of the Pyrénées-Atlantiques department
