= Ludger Mees =

German historian (born 1957)

- Mees in 2019
- Born: Ludger Karl Paul Mees; 1957 (age 68–69); Essen, West Germany
- Employer: University of the Basque Country

Academic background
- Education: University of Münster; Bielefeld University

Ludger Karl Paul Mees (born 1957) is a German historian and professor of history at the University of the Basque Country. His research focuses on the political history of the Basque Country during the 20th century.

== Biography ==
Mees was born in Essen. At the age of 15, he visited Guernica with his family, where he was first exposed to Basque culture. He received a PhD in history from Bielefeld University, where he worked as an assistant professor until 1991. He co-wrote El péndulo patriótico. Historia del Partido Nacionalista Vasco (1999) with Santiago de Pablo. Between 2004 and 2009, he served as vice-rector of the University of the Basque Country.

=== Personal life ===
Mees speaks German, English, French, Spanish, and Basque. He lives in Zarautz with his wife, who hails from Navarre. He is a fan of football club Real Sociedad.

== Selected bibliography ==
=== Books ===
- Mees, Ludger (1992). Nacionalismo vasco, movimiento obrero y cuestion social (in Spanish). Sabino Arana. ISBN 978-8488379009.
- Mees, Ludger (2003). Nationalism, Violence and Democracy: The Basque Clash of Identities. Palgrave Macmillan. ISBN 978-1403943897.
- Mees, Ludger; Klaus-Jürgen, Nagel; Puhle, Hans-Jürgen (2005). Kampf um den Wein: Modernisierung und Interessenpolitik im spanischen Weinbau Rioja, Navarra und Katalonien 1860-1940 (in German). Verlag für Geschichte und Politik. ISBN 978-3702804060.
- De Pablo, Santiago; Mees, Ludger (2005). El péndulo patriótico: historia del Partido Nacionalista Vasco, 1895-2005 (in Spanish). Editorial Crítica. ISBN 978-8484326854.
- Mees, Ludger (2006). El profeta pragmático: Aguirre, el primer Lehendakari (1939-1960) (in Spanish). Alberdania. ISBN 978-8496643031.
- Mees, Ludger (2019). The Basque Contention: Ethnicity, Politics, Violence. Taylor & Francis. ISBN 978-1857439632.

=== Journal articles ===
- Mees, Ludger (January 2000). "The Basque Peace Process, Nationalism and Political Violence". The Management of Peace Processes: 154–194. doi:10.1057/9780333993668_5.
- Mees, Ludger (January 2001). "Between votes and bullets. Conflicting ethnic identities in the Basque Country". Ethnic and Racial Studies. 24 (5): 798–827. doi:10.1080/01419870120063981.
- Mees, Ludger (June 2004). "Politics, economy, or culture? The rise and development of Basque nationalism in the light of social movement theory". Theory and Society. 33 (3–4): 311–331. doi:10.1023/B:RYSO.0000038602.33658.92. JSTOR 4144875.
- Mees, Ludger (January 2015). "Nationalist Politics at the Crossroads: The Basque Nationalist Party and the Challenge of Sovereignty (1998–2014)". Nationalism and Ethnic Politics. 21 (1): 44–62. doi:10.1080/13537113.2015.1003487.
- Elias, Anwen; Mees, Ludger (April 2017). "Between accommodation and secession: Explaining the shifting territorial goals of nationalist parties in the Basque Country and Catalonia". Revista d'Estudis Autonòmics i Federals (25): 129–165. doi:10.2436/20.8080.01.17.
- Mees, Ludger (July 2018). "Ethnogenesis in the Pyrenees: The Contentious Making of a National Identity in the Basque Country (1643–2017)". European History Quarterly. 48 (3): 462–489. doi:10.1177/0265691418777994.
