= Luis Núñez Astrain =

Spanish academic

Luis C. Nuñez Astrain is a linguist and sociologist, and was editor of the newspaper Egin.

He has a Bachelor of Arts in Linguistics and Sociology from the Sorbonne.

== Bibliography ==
- Así está la enseñanza primaria (1969)
- Euskara gaur (1971)
- Fonología consonántica de un dialecto del euskera de Zuberoa (1976) ISSN 0582-6152, Vol. 10, Nº. 1, 1976, pp. 153–198
- Clases sociales en Euskadi (1997), Txertoa ("Social Classes in Basque Country") ISBN 84-7148-032-8
- Opresión y defensa del euskera (1977), Txertoa ("Oppression and defense of the Basque language") OCLC 3479537
- La sociedad vasca actual (1977), Txertoa ISBN 84-7148-034-4
- Estatuto de la mayoria?, Punto y Hora, 1-8 Nov. 1979
- Euskadi Sur Electoral (1980) ISBN 84-85288-99-8
- Euskadi eta Askatasuna/Euskal Herria y la libertad (1993, 8 volumes), Txalaparta
- la razón vasca (1995), Txalaparta; foreword by Gilles Perrault. ISBN 84-8136-932-2
  - La Raó basca : el País Basc, un poble que ens amaguen (1997), Catalan, Txalaparta. ISBN 84-8136-059-7.
  - The Basques : their struggle for independence (1997), Welsh Academic Press, trans. from the French by Meic Stephens. Foreword by Ned Thomas
  - La ragione basca (1999), trans. Marco Alciati, Roberta Gozzi. Milano : Punto Rosso
- El euskera arcaico. extensión y parentescos (November, 2003), Txalaparta. ("The Archaic Euskera")
- Parentescos y antigua extensión del euskera (2003) ISSN 0214-624X, Nº. 17, 2003, pp. 9–300
- Antzinako euskaraz (2004) ISBN 84-89772-99-1

== See also ==
- Aquitanian language
