= Donostia-San Sebastián International Peace Conference =

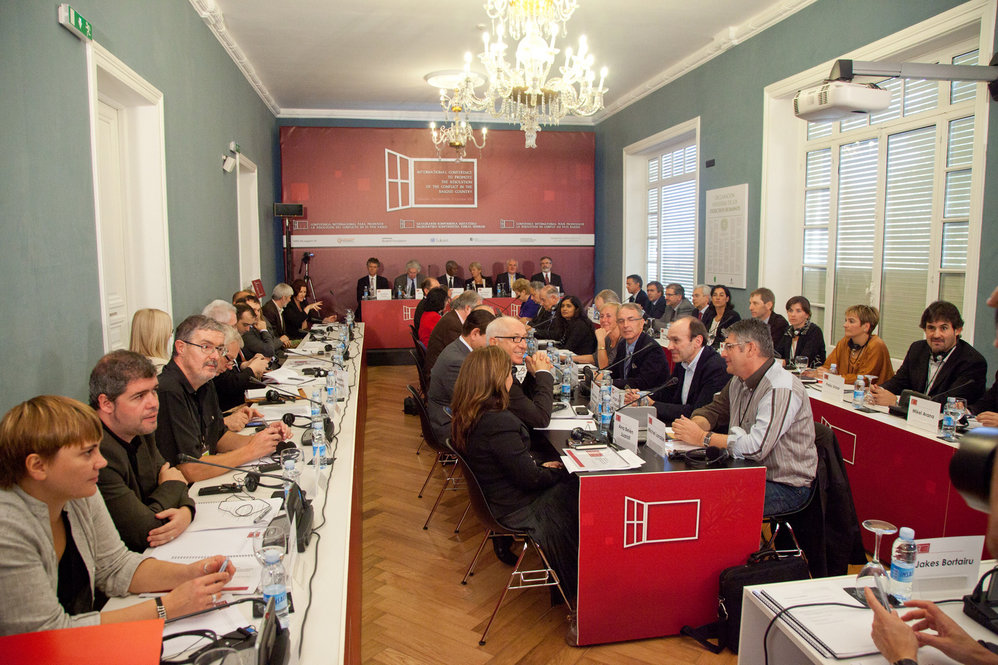
Prior to the conference, the international personalities are sitting at the table at the back, the organizers at the table at the center, and the Basque politicians, syndicalists and other social agents at the tables at the sides.

The International Conference to Promote the Resolution of the Conflict in the Basque Country — more widely known as the Donostia-San Sebastián International Peace Conference — was a conference aimed at promoting a resolution to the Basque conflict, which took place in San Sebastián (Basque Country) on October 17, 2011, at Aiete Palace. It was organized by the Basque citizens' group Lokarri, and included leaders of Basque parties, as well as six international personalities known for their work in the field of politics and pacification: Kofi Annan (former UN Secretary-General), Bertie Ahern (former Taoiseach of Ireland), Gro Harlem Brundtland (international leader in sustainable development and public health, former Prime Minister of Norway), Pierre Joxe (former Interior Minister of France), Gerry Adams (president of Sinn Féin, member of the Irish Parliament) and Jonathan Powell (British diplomat who served as the first Downing Street Chief of Staff). Tony Blair — former Prime Minister of the United Kingdom — could not be present due to commitments in the Middle East, but he supported the final declaration. The former US President Jimmy Carter (2002 Nobel Peace Prize) and the former US senator George J. Mitchell (former United States Special Envoy for Middle East Peace) also backed this declaration.

The conference resulted in a five-point statement that included a plea for ETA to renounce any armed activities and to demand instead negotiations with the Spanish and French authorities to end the conflict. It was seen as a possible prelude to the end of ETA's violent campaign for an independent Basque homeland, and three days later — on October 20 — ETA announced "definitive cessation of its armed activity".

== Final declaration ==
The final declaration, read by Bertie Ahern, with Basque language subtitles.

The Final declaration has five points, and it's written as follows:

1. We call upon ETA to make a public declaration of the definitive cessation of all armed action and to request talks with the governments of Spain and France to address exclusively the consequences of the conflict.
2. If such a declaration is made we urge the governments of Spain and France to welcome it and agree to talks exclusively to deal with the consequences of the conflict.
3. We urge that major steps be taken to promote reconciliation, recognize, compensate and assist all victims, recognize the harm that has been done and seek to heal personal and social wounds.
4. In our experience of resolving conflicts there are often other issues that, if addressed, can assist in the attainment of lasting peace. We suggest that non violent actors and political representatives meet and discuss political and other related issues, in consultation with the citizenry, that could contribute to a new era without conflict. In our experience third party observers or facilitators help such dialogue. Here, such dialogue could also be assisted by international facilitators, if that were desired by those involved.
5. We are willing to form a committee to follow up these recommendations.

== Aftermath ==
Three days after the conference — on October 20 — ETA announced "definitive cessation of its armed activity". They said they were ending their 43-year armed campaign for independence and called on Spain and France to open talks. The Spanish government insisted that it will not negotiate on demands for Basque self-determination until ETA disbands. Spanish prime minister Jose Luis Rodriguez Zapatero described ETA's announcement as "a victory for democracy, law and reason".

== See also ==
- Artisans of Peace (Basque conflict)
