= Irrintzi =

Basque nationalist paramilitary organization

- Founded: 2006
- Country: French Fifth Republic
- Active regions: Northern Basque Country
- Ideology: Basque nationalism
- Wars: Basque conflict

Irrintzi is an armed Basque nationalist group or cell that acts in the Northern Basque Country (Basque: Iparralde).

The first known action of Irrintzi was sabotage in 2006 around Bayonne (including a bomb against the summer house of the French Minister of the Interior Michèle Alliot-Marie). Since then, the organization has attacked railroads, tourist sites, and political party headquarters, mainly by bomb. The Monégasque chef Alain Ducasse, with a restaurant in Bidarray, was accused by Irrintzi of being a speculator and of "folklorising" the Basque Country, and was forced to leave the Basque Country due to the constant attacks that his restaurant suffered. Their declarations are usually closed by the slogan Euskal Herria ez da salgai (transl. the Basque Country is not for sale). This calling card was found in more than 30 attacks against tourist targets during 2007.
