= Comandos Autónomos Anticapitalistas =

Basque armed group in Spain

- Komando Autonomo Antikapitalistak
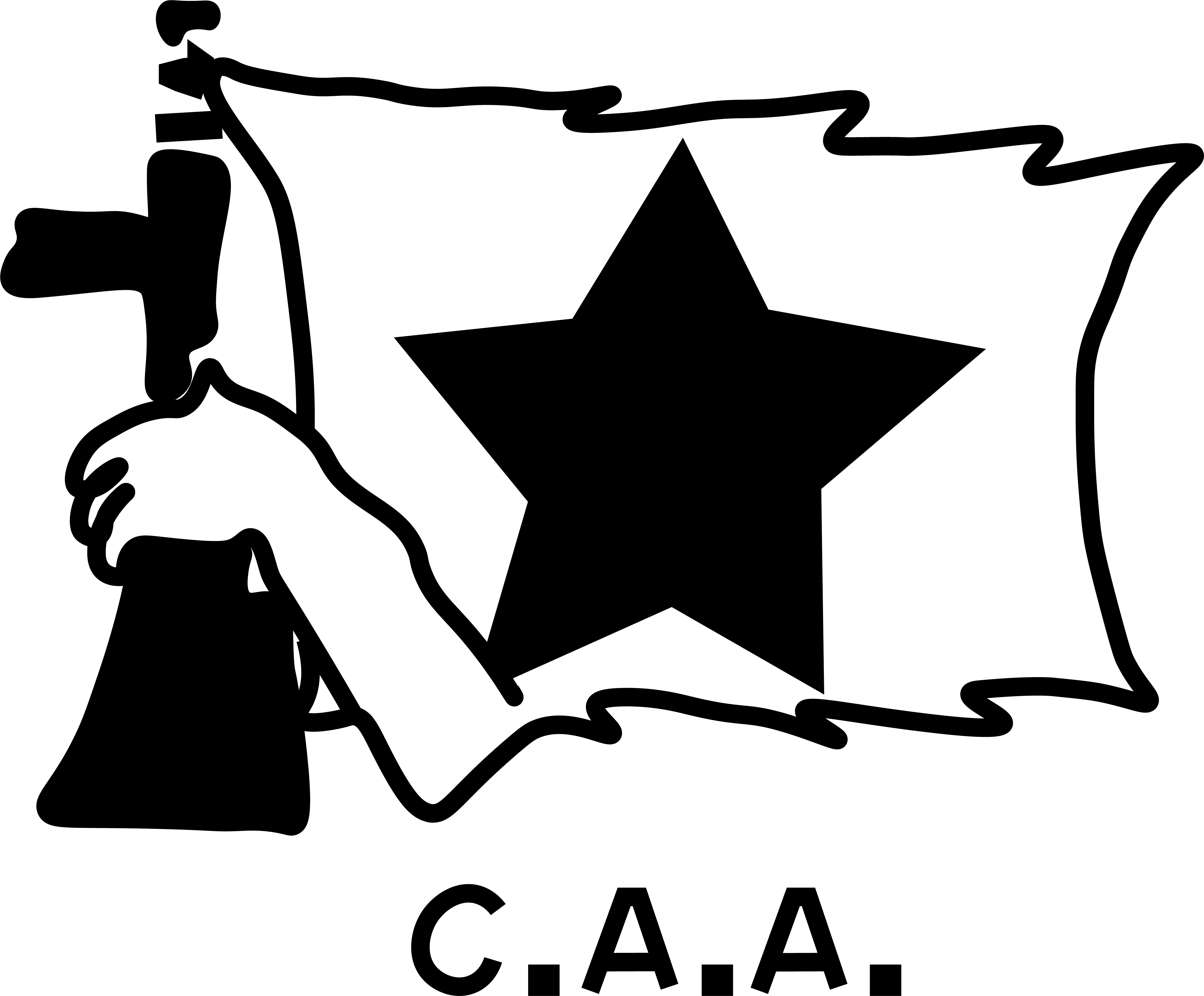
- Logo used by the CAA
- Dates active: Late 1970s – mid-1980s
- Country: Spain
- Active regions: Basque Autonomous Community, Navarre
- Ideology: Independentismo; Autonomism; Libertarian socialism Autogestión

The Comandos Autónomos Anticapitalistas (CAA or CCAA) (Basque: Komando Autonomo Antikapitalistak; "Autonomous Anticapitalist Commandos") were a Basque armed group in Spain with Autonomist Marxist politics, defined as an anarchistic breakaway of ETA.

The group was very active in the 1970s and 1980s. The most important attack was the assassination of Spanish Socialist Workers Party Senator Enrique Casas in 1984. The commandos who killed Casas were called Mendeku (revenge in Basque language). Soon after, one of the few operating CAA commandos was ambushed by the Guardia Civil at the bay of Pasaia, killing four – all but one.

The police tried to link another group they called Mendeku to the CAA, after an attack against the headquarters of the Spanish Socialist Workers' Party in Portugalete in 1987 where two people died.

The ambush at Pasaia is dealt with in a documentary film called "Pasaiako Badia". In this film, witnesses, relatives and others recount the arrest of Rosa Jimeno by the Spanish police, her torture and the trap set for the CAA, which included Rosa being tied up and a rendezvous with the members of CAA arranged. She was forced to set a date with CAA members near the harbor at Pasaia in March 1984. Once the CAA members arrived in the harbor the armed police, shot Pelu and Pelitxo, killing both, and arrested two, 'Txapas' and 'Kurro', who were tortured and killed. Joseba Merino and Rosa survived. The G.A.L. a paramilitary group including former Francoist officers which used public funds and participated in the Spanish state's war on terrorism was allegedly involved in the ambush.

== CAA members killed in action ==
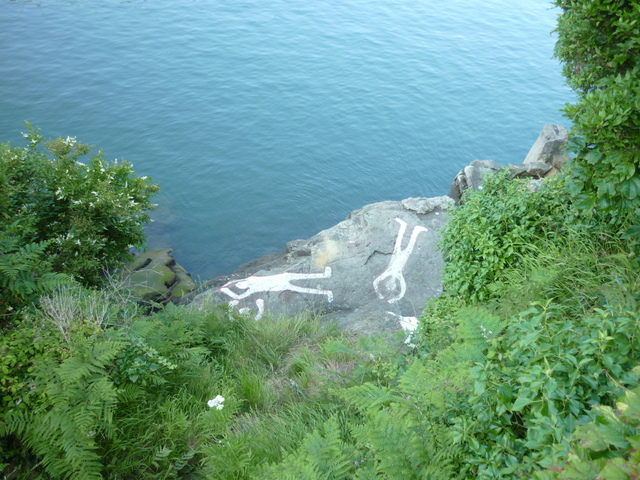
Painting in the coast of Pasaia where four members of CCAA were shot dead by Policía Nacional in April 1984

- Gregorio Fernández Riaño (1979)
- José Miguel Etxeberria, "Naparra" (1980)
- Javier San Martín Goikoetxea (1983)
- José Ignacio Segurola Maioz (1983)
- José Mari Izura (1984)
- Rafael Delas (1984)
- Pedro Mari Isart (1984)
- Dionisio Aizpurua (1984)

== See also ==
- Anarchism in Spain
