= Brian Currin =

South African lawyer

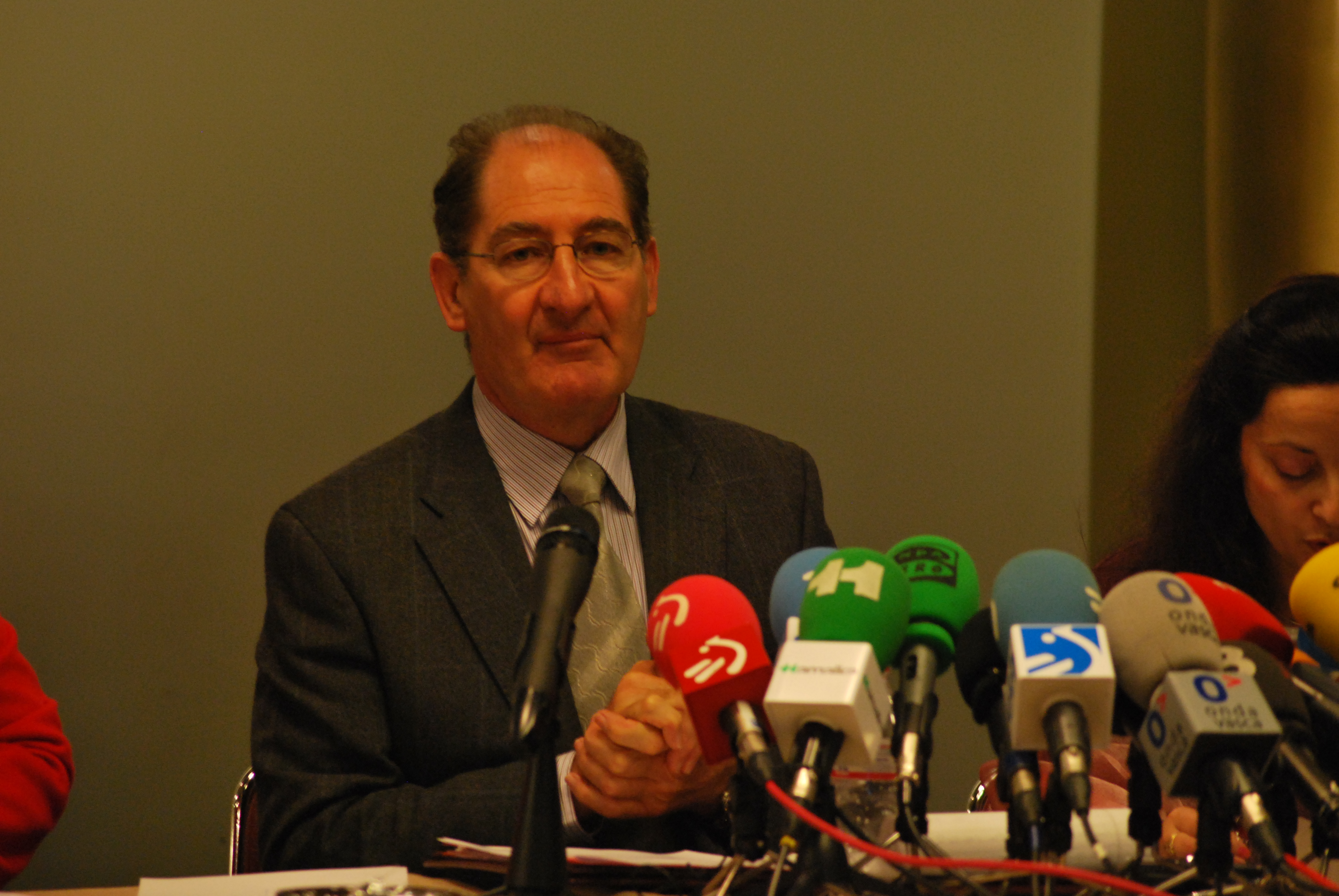
Brian Currin

Brian Currin (born 20 September 1950) is a South African lawyer who was instrumental in the establishment of the South African Truth and Reconciliation Commission.

Currin practiced law in Pretoria from 1977 to 1987, specializing in labour law and civil and human rights, and now works in mediation and institutional transformation. In 1994 he was appointed by South African President Nelson Mandela to chair a Prison Audit Committee and was subsequently involved in the creation of the Truth and Reconciliation Commission. In 1987 he founded the National Directorate of Lawyers for Human Rights which he headed for eight years.

He has worked in Sri Lanka, Rwanda and the Middle East on political transformation. Currin now co-chairs the Sentence Review Commission in Northern Ireland, which decides on the early release of prisoners who have committed terrorism-related offences.

In 2000, he became an independent mediator in the Drumcree parading dispute and said that he hoped he could achieve a breakthrough in the mediation role because he was a completely independent outsider. But he quit his role in December 2001, saying that as Portadown Orangemen had withdrawn from dialogue, he was "unable to take the process any further".

== Involvement in the Basque conflict ==
Currin was involved since 2004 in trying to help resolve the Basque conflict. His work was funded by the Joseph Rowntree Charitable Trust.

During the 2000s, Currin was part of an international mediators team involved in the search of a negotiated solution for the conflict in the Basque Country between the Basque terrorist group ETA (Basque Country and Freedom) and the Spanish and French governments. In November 2010 this group was officially set up as the International Contact Group for the Basque Country. The Group had as mandate "to expedite, facilitate and enable the achievement of political normalization in the Basque Country"

This mediators team was not recognized by either the Spanish or the French government. The main associations of victims of ETA asked Currin to stop his mediation role, which they viewed as inadequate and harmful. The biggest Spanish political parties at the time, People's Party and Spanish Socialist Workers' Party, criticized what they considered a lack of knowledge of the political reality in the Basque Country.
