= Mikel Lejarza =

Mikel Lejarza Eguía (born 1947 in Areatza, Spain) is a former member of the Spanish intelligence service. During the 1970s, he infiltrated the Basque separatist organisation ETA, providing safe houses in Spain to lodge their commandos. His secret service nickname was El Lobo (The Wolf).

His long-term infiltration concluded with a major police operation in 1975 which resulted in over 150 arrests. Two of them, after a summary trial, were among the last political prisoners condemned to death and executed under Franco's regime. Those condemned to prison terms were released when Juan Carlos I became king some months later.

A movie about his life, El Lobo, was made in 2004. His appearance has been surgically altered and, by the time when the film was released, he was still a target for ETA assassins.
