= International Contact Group (Basque politics) =

Presentation of the ICG; left to right Pierre Hazan, Brian Currin, Nuala O'Loan and Raymond Kendall

The International Contact Group (ICG) is a group promoted by Brian Currin aiming to "expedite, facilitate and enable the achievement of political normalization in the Basque Country". The members of the Group, presented on 14 February 2011 in Bilbao, are Silvia Casale, Pierre Hazan, Raymond Kendall, Nuala O'Loan and Alberto Spektorowski.

== Background ==
On 29 March 2010, Brian Currin issued in Brussels a Statement by International Leaders in Conflict Resolution and Peace Processes asking ETA for a permanent and internationally verifiable ceasefire.

Following ETA's announcement of cessation of offensive armed activities on 5 September 2010, Brian Currin visited the Basque Country and declared that ETA should give a positive response to the Brussels Declaration.

== Mandate and role ==
Their mandate and role were presented by Brian Currin on 12 November 2010. The ICG's mandate includes:

- To promote facilitate and enable the legalization of Abertzale Left;
- To encourage confidence building measures such as:
  overcoming special measures of restrictions on political activity and;
  adapting the penitentiary policy to the new transformed political situation;
- To encourage and assist the parties, for as long as required, with the preparation and development of an agenda for political dialogue;
- To encourage, facilitate and enable, for as long as required by the parties, all-inclusive multi-party talks and negotiations, which would be subject to the Mitchell Principles, without conditions and with no pre-determined outcome. The objective of the multi-party talks and negotiations would be the achievement of an all-Inclusive agreement to overcome the political conflict;
- To mediate, if called upon by the parties, In the event of deadlocks;
- To generally build confidence in the minds of the public that a successful peace process is indeed possible.

== Members ==
=== Silvia Casale ===
Independent consultant to HM Prisons Inspectorate, England and Wales since 1991; Northern Ireland Sentence Review Commissioner since 1998. Adviser to the Council of Europe Project on National Preventive Mechanisms since 2010.

Member in respect of the United Kingdom of the CPT (European Committee for the Prevention of Torture and inhuman or degrading treatment or punishment) 1997-2009 and President from 2000 to 2007.

Member in respect of the United Kingdom and Chairperson of the SPT (United Nations Subcommittee on Prevention of Torture and other cruel, inhuman or degrading treatment or punishment) 2007–2009.

Former member of the Parole Board for England and Wales. Trustee of the Prison Reform Trust and the Prisoners Advice and Care Trust.

=== Pierre Hazan ===
Pierre Hazan is teaching Transitional Justice in Sciences-Po Paris and in Geneva University. He is also the author of many books on International Criminal Justice and on Truth Commissions, including the acclaimed Judging War, Judging History, Behind Peace and Reconciliation, Stanford University Press, 2010 (PrizeGeorges Dreifuss). He also has collaborated in different capacities with the Office of the UN High Commissioner for Human Rights.

Pierre Hazan was a Senior Fellow at the United States Institute of Peace (Washington DC, 2006) and a Fellow at Harvard Law School (2005). Prior to that, he was a UN correspondent in Geneva with the French newspaper Libération and with the Swiss daily Le Temps. In this position, he has covered many international crises and conflicts including those in the Balkans, in the Great Lakes region of Africa, in the Middle East and others. Pierre Hazan is a Swiss national, he is married and has four children.

=== Raymond Kendall ===
Raymond Kendall: Honorary Secretary General of Interpol, born October 1933 at Canterbury, Kent, United Kingdom; educated at grammar school and Exeter College, Oxford 1953 to 1956; Master of Arts Degree in modern languages; military service in Royal Air Force 1951 to 1953 principally during emergency in Malaya Colonial police in Uganda from 1956 to 1962; Metropolitan Police New Scotland Yard 1962 to 1986 essentially in Special Branch terminating with rank of Deputy Assistant Commissioner; Secretary General of Interpol 1985 to 2000 when he retired; President of European Union Anti Fraud Office beginning 2000' holder of Queen's Police Medal and Chevalier of Legion d'Honneur (France); connected with activities of non-governmental organisations in drugs and security fields.

=== Nuala O'Loan ===
Baroness Nuala O’Loan is a member of the UK House of Lords. She is Ireland's Roving Ambassador for Conflict Resolution and Special Envoy to Timor Leste and for UNSCR 1325, Women, Peace and Security. She was a member of the International Group for Dialogue and Peace in the Basque Country. She chaired a Formal Investigation into Human Rights in England and Wales for the UK Equality and Human Rights Commission in 2009, and conducted a review in 2010, for the UK Home Office, of allegations of abuse against UKBA staff. From 2000 – November 2007 she was the Police Ombudsman for Northern Ireland, responsible for the investigation of all complaints of criminal and non-criminal misconduct against the police, and of other matters involving possible police wrongdoing not the subject matter of complaint. Baroness Nuala O’Loan is a qualified solicitor and held the Jean Monnet Chair in European Law at the University of Ulster.

She has held office as Chair of the Northern Ireland Consumer Committee for Electricity, and as a member of the Commission for Racial Equality's Formal Investigation into Racism in Policing in England and Wales, the Police Authority for Northern Ireland, the Northern Health and Social Services Board; the General Consumer Council for Northern Ireland, and a Legal Expert Member of the European Commission's Consumers Consultative Council. For seven years, Baroness O’Loan was also a custody visitor to police stations.

She has produced more than 70 articles and other publications, and acted in an advisory capacity to government agencies responsible for policing and police accountability, in India, Brazil, Indonesia South Africa, Malaysia, USA, Canada, Finland, The Netherlands, Macedonia, Romania, The Republic of Ireland, Portugal and throughout the United Kingdom. She has received honorary degrees of LL.D from the University of Ulster, the University of Ireland Maynooth, the Higher Education and Technical Awards Council, Ireland, and from Queen's University Belfast.

=== Alberto Spektorowski ===
Alberto Spektorowski is senior lecturer in political science at Tel Aviv University. Born in 1952, he was member of the strategic group created by former Israel Foreign affairs Minister Shlomo Ben-Ami, during the Camp David negotiations in 2000.

He has also taught at Columbia University (New York) the University of Wisconsin (Madison, USA), the Interdisciplinary College de Herztlia (Israel) and at the Hebrew University of Jerusalem.

He is a member of Israeli-Palestinian Civil Society Committee for Ceasefire.

== Official site ==
- Official website
