= Premiership of José María Aznar =

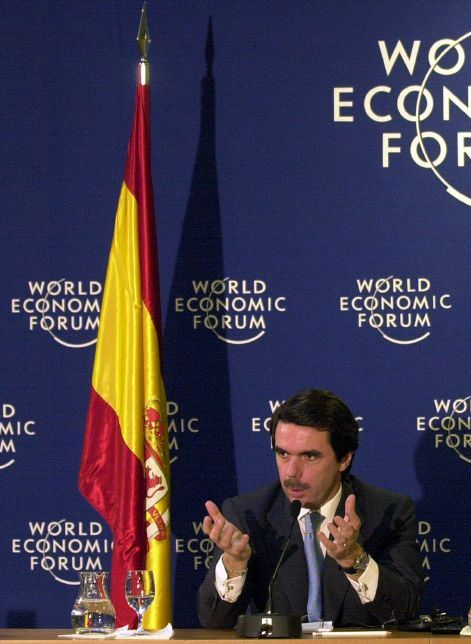
José María Aznar in 2000

The governments of José María Aznar (1996–2004) comprise the third period of the reign of Juan Carlos I of Spain. For 8 years, the People's Party (PP) held the government of Spain under the presidency of José María Aznar. In his first term (1996–2000), not having obtained an absolute majority, the PP had to rely on the Catalan nationalist CiU to govern, but in his second term (2000–2004) he had no need for agreements since he obtained an absolute majority in the general elections of March 2000.

During this second period of government, the PP faced greater opposition from the PSOE, which after the election of a new leadership team headed by José Luis Rodríguez Zapatero finally overcame a long crisis experienced after successive defeats in the 1996 and 2000 elections. Likewise, between 2000 and 2004, the PP had to face a major social opposition to some of its policies - such as the education policy or the National Water Plan that contemplated the transfer of the Ebro to Valencia, Murcia and Almeria - that reached its peak on June 20, 2002, with the general strike called by the two big unions CCOO and UGT to show their disapproval of the "decretazo" ("big decree" in English) that contemplated cuts in unemployment benefits, and that was finally revoked.

The street protests continued due to the government's management of the Prestige oil tanker spill - that in November 2002 had its hull damaged off the coast of Galicia, causing a part of the fuel oil it was carrying to spill into the sea, contaminating the Galician coast within a few days with tons of chapapote (English: tar, asphalt) - and above all in rejection of the war in Iraq, that was supported by the Aznar government.

== The "legislature of tension" ==
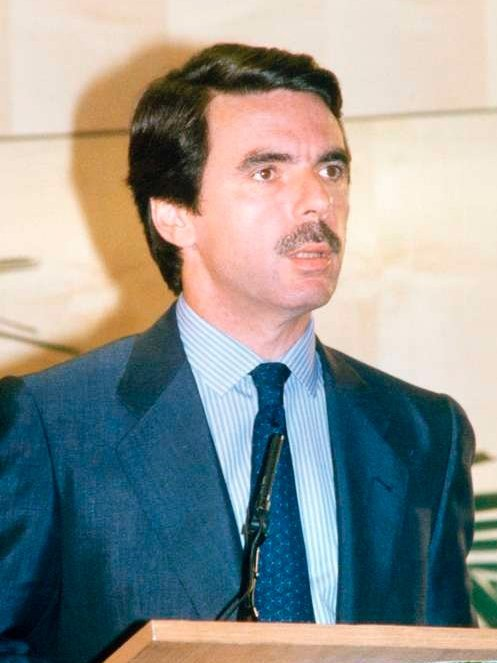
José María Aznar in 1996

A surprising result of the elections of June 1993 was that the PSOE won again and José María Aznar's People's Party - once confident of their victory - was defeated. However, the Socialists did not repeat the absolute majority they held since 1982 - they were down to 17 seats - so, in order to govern, Felipe González had to reach a parliamentary agreement with the Catalan and Basque nationalists.

Aside from dealing with the economic crisis initiated in the second half of 1992, the socialist government of Felipe González had to face the emergence of new scandals, resulting in a harsh confrontation with the opposition, both the Popular Party and United Left, which is why the fourth socialist mandate would be known as the "legislature of tension".

The most spectacular of the new scandals, and the one with the greatest popular and media impact, was the "Roldán case", named after Luis Roldán, the first non-military director of the Civil Guard in its history, who was arrested on charges of making a fortune by collecting illegal commissions from the Civil Guard's construction contractors and appropriating the reserved funds of the Ministry of the Interior and who, in April 1994, four months after his arrest, went on the run. Such scandals opened a new breach of trust in the Socialist government that resulted in demands for the resignation of the President by José María Aznar, leader of the People's Party, and Julio Anguita, general coordinator of United Left.

The 1994 European Parliament elections of June 1994 were held in this environment, with the Popular Party surpassing the PSOE in the number of votes for the first time - obtaining 40% of the votes versus 30% for the Socialists - leading to a demand for general elections, that Felipe González refused once confirmed that he still had the support of the CiU. From then on, José María Aznar adopted the "machacona invectiva" ("repetitive invective" in English) of "Váyase, señor González" ("Go away, Mr. González" in English) in every parliamentary intervention, cheered by the deputies of the "popular" parliamentary group.

A month before the European elections, Judge Baltasar Garzón - who left his seat as deputy in Congress for the PSOE and the position of Government Delegate for the National Plan on Drugs and returned to court at the National Court - reopened the GAL case and granted provisional freedom to policemen José Amedo and Michel Domínguez, who had been convicted in 1988 for their participation in several attacks attributed to the "Antiterrorist Liberation Groups" and who were willing to disclose everything they knew once the government did not approve their pardon as promised. Amedo and Domínguez's statements led to the arrest of several high-ranking officials of the Socialist administration for their alleged participation in the kidnapping and frustrated assassination of the French citizen Segundo Marey, mistaken for a member of ETA by a GAL commando.

Another major scandal related to the dirty war against ETA was uncovered in March 1995. The Civil Guard general Enrique Rodríguez Galindo was arrested by order of the National Court judge Javier Gómez de Liaño for his alleged involvement in the "Lasa and Zabala case", the kidnapping and subsequent murder of José Antonio Lasa and José Ignacio Zabala, alleged members of ETA captured in France by the GAL in 1983 and whose bodies, buried in quicklime, were found in Busot (Alicante) two years later.

A new GAL related scandal emerged shortly after - known as the "CESID papers" scandal - that would show, according to David Ruiz, the "unusual heights" reached by "the strategy of harassment of Felipe González' government." It was about the theft by the second chief of the secret service, Colonel Juan Alberto Perote, of a series of documents that apparently implicated more socialist politicians in the "GAL case" and that Perote, according to the newspaper El País, had delivered to Mario Conde to blackmail the high authorities of the State to neutralize the legal actions taken against him and Javier de la Rosa. Part of the documents were transcripts of illegal wiretaps, forcing the Vice President Narcís Serra, Minister of Defense at the time of the wiretaps, and his successor in office, Julián García Vargas, to resign.

Results of the 1996 general elections in Spain by province

In May 1995, municipal and autonomic elections were held in an atmosphere influenced by the attack perpetrated by ETA on April 20 - from which the leader of the opposition, José María Aznar, miraculously escaped unharmed - and the arrest and surrender in Laos of the fugitive Luis Roldán. The victory was once again for the People's Party, which was almost five points ahead of the PSOE (it obtained 35.2% of the votes cast compared to 30.8% for the Socialists). Almost all the provincial capitals and the cities with the largest populations were governed by the PP.

Faced with a series of scandals, the leader of CiU and president of the Generalitat of Catalonia, Jordi Pujol, withdrew parliamentary support from CiU deputies to the government, leaving it in a minority in the Cortes. The president of the government, Felipe González, had no choice but to call general elections for March 3, 1996.

The Popular Party won the elections but not by the expected wide margin, as it only surpassed the PSOE by 300,000 votes (9.7 million against 9.4 million) and was far from the absolute majority (it got 156 deputies, 15 more than the PSOE). In any case, the PP succeeded in its goal of ousting the Socialists from power, "after trying hard for more than a decade".

United Left, expecting to come close to the PSOE, and even surpass it, had to settle for 21 deputies.

== Socio-economic policy ==
=== Economic modernization ===
The immediate goals of the economic program implemented by the People's Party were:

- To improve the efficiency and competitiveness of the economy through the liberalization of the markets of certain sectors and the complete privatization of public companies, such as Telefónica or Repsol.
- To reduce inflation through the control of public spending and the consequent reduction of the budget deficit - until reaching a zero deficit - and "wage control" to be agreed with the trade unions.
- To make the labor market more "flexible" by promoting "social dialogue" to reduce severance payments and thus encourage permanent hiring. (Note: The agreement between the CEOE, UGT and CCOO and the government was actually signed in April 1997.)

=== Euro introduction ===
The ultimate purpose of these policies was to meet the requirements imposed by the European Union - inflation, public deficit, public debt, interest rates- in order to adopt the new common currency, the euro. And in this area, success was complete because the Spanish economy experienced strong growth, unemployment was reduced and inflation dropped to historic lows, so that in May 1998, Spain was able to join the group of eleven European Union countries that adopted the euro - although it was not until January 1, 2002, that euro bills and coins physically started to circulate.

One of the keys to this success was the policy of privatization of large public companies, which provided the State with enormous extraordinary revenues that served to reduce the public debt and the deficit.

=== The "property bubble" ===
The other side of the strong economic growth of these years was the property bubble it generated, since the main economic engine was housing construction and the demand for housing was due to the fact that many people did not buy them to live in them but as an investment to sell them later at a higher price, thanks to the constant increase in their value. In addition, the acquisition of housing became one of the most pressing problems for many people, especially for young people.

=== Welfare state preservation ===
The favorable economic situation made it possible to maintain social spending (education, health, pensions) while reducing the public deficit and lowering direct taxes. This dispelled the fears raised in certain sectors by the coming to power of the People's Party about the possible reduction of social benefits.

Regarding pensions, for example, the PP reaffirmed the validity of the Toledo Pact, signed in 1995, which guaranteed the preservation and viability of the public pension system based on the contributions of employers and workers. Moreover, thanks to the spectacular increase in the number of affiliates, the Social Security managed to overcome the deficit it had in 1995. This is what prompted the government to submit to Parliament a bill - which was passed in 1999 - for the automatic revaluation of pensions, which would be equal to the inflation registered each year.

=== The new immigration phenomenon ===
The Aznar government did not get the same support when it proposed the reform of the 1985 Immigration Law, which had become obsolete to deal with the new phenomenon of immigration, something completely new in Spain's recent history. Thus, in late 1999, a paradox occurred when the law finally approved by the Cortes did not have the support of the PP, since CiU voted with the opposition, but as soon as it obtained an absolute majority in the 2000 elections, the PP changed the law in order to restrict the entry of migrants and limit the rights of those who were not regularized - the so-called "sin papeles" ("no papers" in English), which in 2000 were about 250,000 out of a total of 800,000 migrants.

Additionally, the events occurred in El Ejido (Almeria) in early 2000 - dozens of Moroccans were attacked by a large group of neighbors in response to the murder of a woman attributed to a mentally ill man of Maghrebi origin - starkly highlighted the problem of xenophobia related to emigration.

During the Premiership of José María Aznar, Spain gave residency to more than 500,000 undocumented migrants in different amnesties in 1996, 2000 and 2001.

== Change in anti-terrorist policy and the "peripheral" nationalism ==
=== Anti-terrorist policy ===
The PP government developed an anti-terrorist policy based on an idea that no democratic government had defended until then: that only police measures could put an end to ETA. Thus, the only possible "dialogue" with ETA was the surrender of weapons.

The government achieved a resounding first success with the release in early July 1997 of José Ortega Lara, a prison officer and PP militant who had been held hostage by ETA for 532 days (the longest kidnapping in the history of democracy). But a few days later, on July 11, another event took place that would open a new chapter in the history of the "Basque conflict".

That day ETA kidnapped Miguel Angel Blanco, a young PP councilman from the Biscayan town of Ermua, and threatened to "execute" him if the government did not agree to transfer ETA prisoners to prisons in the Basque Country within 48 hours. Upon hearing the news, the largest social mobilization against terrorism in history took place, especially in the Basque Country and Navarre, which was even more significant, but after the deadline ETA assassinated Miguel Angel Blanco.

This only increased even more the rejection to ETA, which also extended to its "political arm", Herri Batasuna, who did not condemn the assassination - and in May 1998, Judge Garzón ordered the shutdown of the Abertzale nationalist newspaper Egin due to its alleged links with ETA. The press started using the term "spirit of Ermua" to explain that immense anti-terrorist social mobilization.

=== Reaffirmation of Spanish nationalism ===
The PP government's anti-terrorist policy went hand in hand with a reaffirmation of Spanish nationalism, since the PP did not consider Spain as "a nation of nations" and even less as a "plurinational state" but as a "single nation", although "culturally diverse".

As a result, the Aznar government developed a policy of "standardization" of the State of Autonomies which was opposed by the sub-state nationalist parties of Catalonia (CiU), the Basque Country (PNV) and Galicia (BNG) - that in July 1998 signed the Declaration of Barcelona, in which they agreed to carry out a joint policy for the recognition of their respective "national realities".

=== The Lizarra Pact and the ETA truce ===
The "spirit of Ermua" was interpreted by the PNV as a "Spanishist" offensive that sought to put an end to the hegemony that Basque nationalism held since the return to democracy. Thus, in March 1998, the lehendakari José Antonio Ardanza announced a "Pacification Plan" in which, based on the 1988 Ajuria Enea Pact, he declared the need to respond to the "civic-political dissidence of a significant portion of society that, revolving around "terrorism" [quotation marks in the original], is unwilling to accept the status quo".

To do so, he proposed that after achieving the cessation of ETA's violence, a dialogue should be opened between all the Basque political forces, the result of which should be accepted by the central government and the rest of the State institutions. Both the PP and the PSOE refused to participate in the proposed dialogue under these conditions, which meant "the demise of the Ajuria Enea Table, that would never meet again", as Charles Powell pointed out.

The failure of the Ardanza Plan led the leadership of the PNV - and of Eusko Alkartasuna - to contact the ETA leadership so that it would declare an indefinite truce and, in exchange, it would agree on an alternative with HB that would "go beyond" the framework of the 1979 Statute of Autonomy. On September 12, 1998, PNV, EA and HB - and also the United Left of the Basque Country - signed the Lizarra-Estella Pact, and four days later ETA announced the indefinite halt to violence. Thus, 1999 was the first year since 1971 in which there were no deaths as a result of ETA attacks, although the street violence of the kale borroka carried out by the youth organizations of the nationalist left did not disappear.

During the truce, the PP government even established contact with the ETA leadership but without making "political" concessions - although more than a hundred ETA prisoners were transferred to prisons in the Basque Country - and maintaining the idea expressed by the Minister of the Interior Jaime Mayor Oreja that it was a "trap truce" (tregua trampa), that is, that ETA had proclaimed the halt to violence only to reorganize itself after the heavy police defeats it had received.

In November 1999, ETA announced the breaking of the truce as no progress had been made in the Basque "national construction process" - neither PNV nor EA had accepted its proposal to set up a "sovereign constitutional Parliament" elected outside the Statute - and in January 2000, it perpetrated a new attack: the assassination of Lieutenant Colonel Antonio Gracia Blanco in Madrid. Another reason for ending the truce had been that the 1998 elections to the Basque Parliament had not resulted in an overwhelming victory of the parties supporting the Lizarra Pact against the "constitutionalist" parties - the PP and the PSOE, defenders of the validity of the 1982 Statute - and neither did the foral and municipal elections of June 1999, in which the "constitutionalists" also achieved a majority in the provincial council of Alava and in the city council of Vitoria, both governed from then on by the People's Party and Alavese Unity.

=== PP-PSOE anti-terrorism pact and PNV's "sovereigntist shift" ===
During 2000, ETA perpetrated several attacks against leaders and elected officials of the "constitutionalist" parties that had opposed the Lizarra Pact and the PP and the PSOE decided to sign an Anti-Terrorist Pact, which neither the PNV nor EA joined. This pact - together with the legal encirclement of Batasuna and the growing police effectiveness - weakened ETA to the point that the number of attacks was reduced. In 2003 there were only three with fatal victims and in 2004 there were none.

However, the confrontation between "nationalists" and "constitutionalists" did not diminish, since the former still maintained the validity of the "sovereignist shift" (giro soberanista) they had taken with the signing of the Lizarra Pact, although the pact was suspended when Batasuna refused to condemn the attack against the socialist leader Fernando Buesa. Maximum tension was reached in the Basque elections of May 2001, in which the "nationalist front" (frente nacionalista) triumphed, although by a narrow margin, which ensured the continuity of the Basque government of PNV's Juan José Ibarretxe, thanks to the support he received from United Left, led in the Basque Country by Javier Madrazo.

=== Illegalization of Batasuna and the "Ibarretxe Plan" ===
Following the relative failure of the "constitutionalist front" in the Basque elections of May 2001, the PP government proposed the illegalization of Herri Batasuna - then integrated in the Euskal Herritarrok coalition - for which it agreed with the PSOE and CiU a new Law of Political Parties. Thus, after ETA's attack in Santa Pola in August 2002 - that killed two people and that Batasuna did not condemn - the process of illegalization began, accompanied by the "suspension" of Batasuna's activities by order of Judge Garzón, who found evidence of its connection with ETA.

In early 2003, the Supreme Court declared Batasuna illegal, considering it to be the "political arm" of ETA, so that it could no longer present candidacies in the municipal and regional elections of May 2003, nor in the general elections of the following year. Both the new Law of Parties and the process of illegalization of Batasuna were strongly contested by the Basque nationalist parties and, as an alternative, the lehendakari Juan José Ibarretxe proposed a "pacification plan" based on the holding of a referendum regulating "the free association of Euskadi to the plurinational Spanish State". The proposal, known as the Ibarretxe Plan, further accentuated the confrontation between "nationalists" and "constitutionalists" and between the governments of Madrid and Vitoria.

=== The Carod case ===
In the Catalonian elections of November 2003, no party achieved an absolute majority, but thanks to the agreement reached between the PSC-PSOE, Republican Left of Catalonia (ERC, a pro-independence party that had experienced a meteoric rise), and Initiative for Catalonia Greens (a party associated with the United Left), the first left-wing government was formed in Catalonia since 1936, led by the socialist Pasqual Maragall (ousting CiU from the power it had monopolized for 23 years). The pacte del Tinell of the PSC-PSOE, IC and ERC (in which the tripartit's program was agreed, expressly excluding any agreement with the PP) was harshly criticized by Aznar's government and by the new PP leader Mariano Rajoy - who at the end of August 2003 had been proposed by Aznar to replace him as candidate in the following year's elections - because it meant the entry into the Catalan government of a pro-independence party such as ERC - in addition to the Basque "sovereigntist" challenge of the Ibarretxe Plan. There was also strong opposition voices against the tripartit within the PSOE.

In late January 2004, scandal broke out that caused the Catalonian government of the tripartite government to totter. In its edition of January 24, the newspaper ABC published that the leader of ERC Josep Lluís Carod Rovira, the Generalitat's minister in cap, had met in Perpignan with ETA's top leadership to negotiate a truce exclusively for Catalonia. Carod left the position of conseller en cap (and later the government) after recognizing that the meeting with ETA had taken place, but affirming that he had not negotiated anything, least of all a truce restricted to Catalonia. However, a few days later ETA declared a truce "only for Catalonia with effect from January 1, 2004".

President José María Aznar and PP candidate Mariano Rajoy then demanded that PSOE leader Rodríguez Zapatero immediately break the " Catalonian tripartite", but this did not happen and the new crisis was solved with the implicit resignation of Carod Rovira to return to the Catalonian government after the elections of March 14 - thus Maragall appointed a new conceller en cap, also a member of ERC, Josep Bargalló.

== Foreign policy shift ==
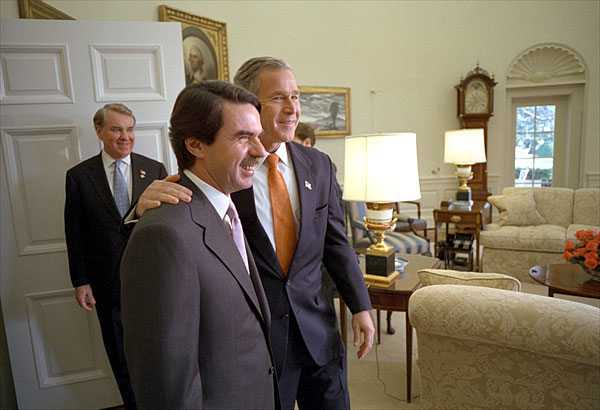
José María Aznar and George W. Bush in the Oval Office of the White House in November 2001

From the outset, the Aznar government was committed to greater Spanish involvement in international actions, as evidenced by the decision to integrate Spain into NATO's military structure as of January 1, 1997. As a result, the need to seek a new model for the Armed Forces that would make them more operational was raised, which together with the dramatic growth of conscientious objection, inclined the PP towards the formula of an exclusively professional army, thus ending compulsory military service - abandoning the mixed model implemented by the Socialists.

On the other hand, the PP opted for greater alignment with the United States, which was immediately reflected in European politics, especially when in 2003 the debate on the draft European Constitution was opened, to which the Spanish government - together with the Polish government - opposed by not accepting the proposed distribution of votes for the adoption of decisions in the European Councils. This policy of "international reaffirmation" was also reflected in the deterioration of relations with Morocco, which reached a peak of tension in the summer of 2002 due to the occupation by Moroccan police of the uninhabited Perejil island, close to Ceuta, which Spain considered to be under its sovereignty. The Spanish government sent several military units to evict the Moroccans from the islet and the conflict was only resolved because the United States intervened and imposed a return to the status quo ante - meaning that the Spanish troops would leave and the islet would remain uninhabited.

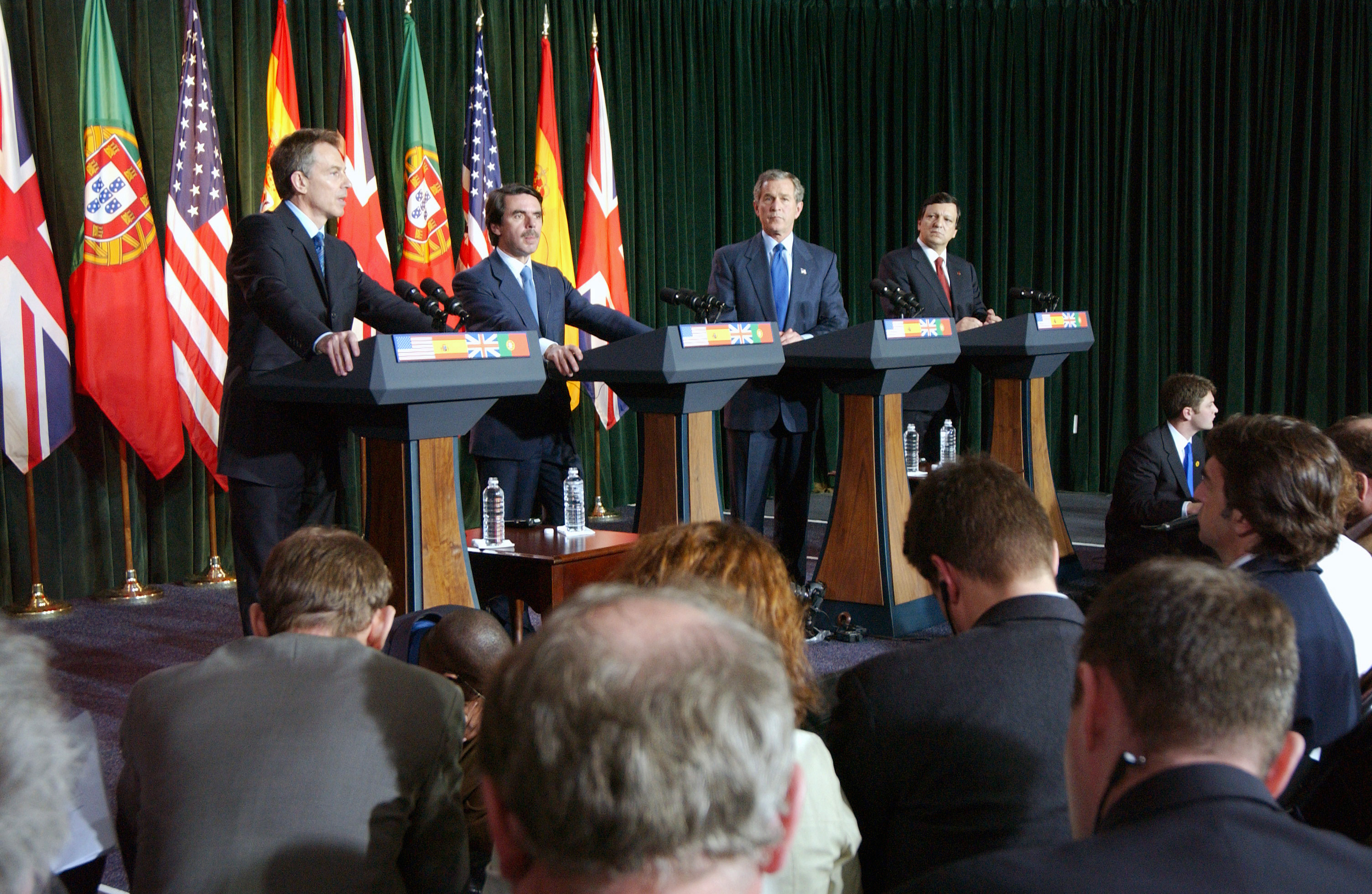
Tony Blair, José María Aznar, George W. Bush and Durão Barroso during a press conference in the Azores Islands on March 17, 2003, where they issued the ultimatum to Saddam Hussein which initiated the Iraq War

Aznar's government strongly supported the "war against terrorism" declared by President George W. Bush after the 9/11 attacks in New York and Washington, so that when the United States started the war in Afghanistan in October 2001 and in Iraq in March 2003, it had Aznar's support, even though public opinion was largely against the latter.

Thus, on March 16, 2003, José María Aznar, US President George W. Bush and British Prime Minister Tony Blair met in the Azores Islands, where the three leaders issued an ultimatum to Saddam Hussein to hand over the weapons of mass destruction he allegedly possessed and then called on all the countries of the world to join the new "Transatlantic Alliance" against terrorism.

Four days later, the invasion of Iraq began and Aznar sent a "joint humanitarian support unit", which arrived in Iraq one day after the fall of Baghdad, on April 9. Meanwhile, demonstrations against the war continued to take place - some led by the Socialist leader Rodríguez Zapatero - although this discontent did not translate into votes in the municipal and regional elections of May 2003 as these did not cause any setback for the People's Party - despite the fact that the PSOE outnumbered the PP in total votes for the first time since 1993.

After the elections, Aznar sent a military contingent to Iraq (1,300 soldiers) to collaborate in the "reconstruction" and "security" of that occupied country. Rodríguez Zapatero responded by announcing that if he won the general elections the following year he would send the troops back.

== 11-M attacks and 2004 March elections ==
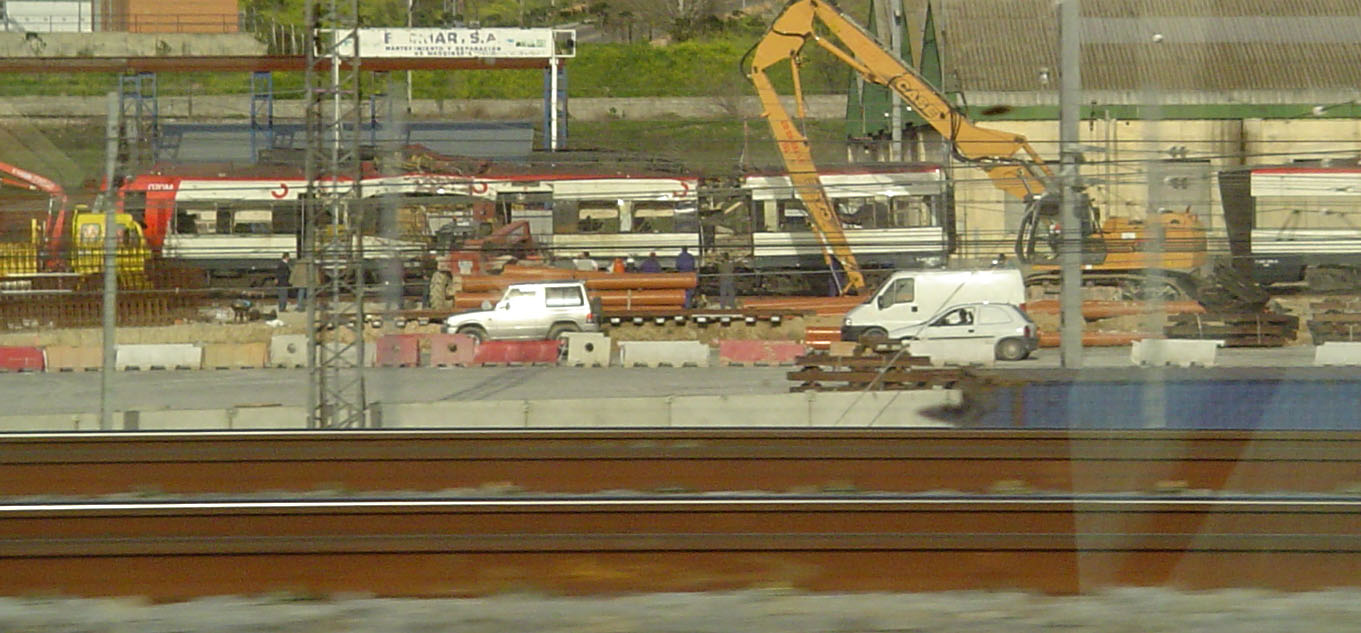
One of the commuter trains bombed the 11M in Madrid

On Thursday, March 11, 2004, three days before the date set for the general elections, ten bombs exploded in Madrid in four suburban trains, killing 192 people and injuring more than 1,755. It was the biggest terrorist attack in Spanish and European history and the political parties decided to end the electoral campaign. Initially it was thought to have been the work of ETA, a suspicion confirmed by the Minister of the Interior Angel Acebes a few hours later. However, the police investigation soon turned to the Islamist terrorism linked to Al-Qaeda - responsible for the 9/11 attacks - although the government maintained that the main hypothesis was still ETA. The confusion over the authorship of the attack was evident in the massive demonstrations of rejection of terrorism that took place the following day - the largest in the history of Spain, as an estimated 11 million people demonstrated that day, Friday, March 12 - with some of the attendees shouting ¿Quién ha sido? (who did it?), "Queremos saber la verdad" (we want to know the truth) and others "ETA asesina" (ETA murderer).

On the afternoon of Saturday, March 13, ''day of reflection'' for the elections of the following day, several thousand demonstrators gathered in front of the PP headquarters in the main cities accusing the government of ''hiding the truth'' and demanding ''to know the truth before voting'', as well as shouting " No to War''. At 8 PM, Minister Acebes made an appearance to inform of the arrest of five Moroccans as the presumed perpetrators of the attacks. ETA's alleged responsibility was definitively called into question when four hours later the minister appeared again to report that a video had been found claiming responsibility for the attack in which an individual appeared who, in Arabic with a Moroccan accent, said in the name of Al-Qaeda:

What has happened in Madrid... is a response to your collaboration with the Bush criminals and their allies... [and] to the crimes that you have caused in the world and specifically in Iraq and Afghanistan and there will be more, God willing.

On Sunday, March 14, 2004, the elections were held and at around 10 PM, it was confirmed that the PSOE had won 164 deputies - 12 short of an absolute majority - while the PP was left with 148. A month later, on April 16, the third changeover since the recovery of democracy in Spain took place: José Luis Rodríguez Zapatero was sworn in as the new President of the government, the fifth since 1977. In Congress, the deputies of his own party, the PSOE, plus those of Republican Left of Catalonia, the United Left-Initiative for Catalonia Greens, the Canarian Coalition, the Galician Nationalist Bloc and Chunta Aragonesista voted in favor. CiU, PNV, EA and Nafarroa Bai abstained. The PP voted against.

== See also ==
- First government of José María Aznar
- Second government of José María Aznar
- Governments of Felipe González
- Reign of Juan Carlos I of Spain
- Governments of Rodríguez Zapatero

== Bibliography ==
- García de Cortázar, Fernando; González Vesga, José Manuel (2012). Breve historia de España (in Spanish) (6th ed.). Madrid: Alianza Editorial. ISBN 978-84-206-7374-5.
- Juliá, Santos (1999). Un siglo de España. Política y sociedad (in Spanish). Madrid: Marcial Pons. ISBN 84-9537903-1.
- Powell, Charles (2002) [2001]. España en democracia, 1975-2000 (in Spanish) (1th Pocket ed.). Barcelona: Plaza & Janés. ISBN 84-9759-022-8.
- Ruiz, David (2002). La España democrática (1975-2000). Política y sociedad (in Spanish). Madrid: Síntesis. ISBN 84-9756-015-9.
- Tusell, Javier (1997). La transición española. La recuperación de las libertades (in Spanish). Madrid: Historia 16-Temas de Hoy. ISBN 84-7679-327-8.

Preceded by Governments of Felipe González	Timeline of Spanish history Governments of José María Aznar; 1996-2004	Succeeded by Governments of Rodríguez Zapatero
