= Monbar Hotel attack =

1985 shooting in Spain

- Part of the Basque conflict
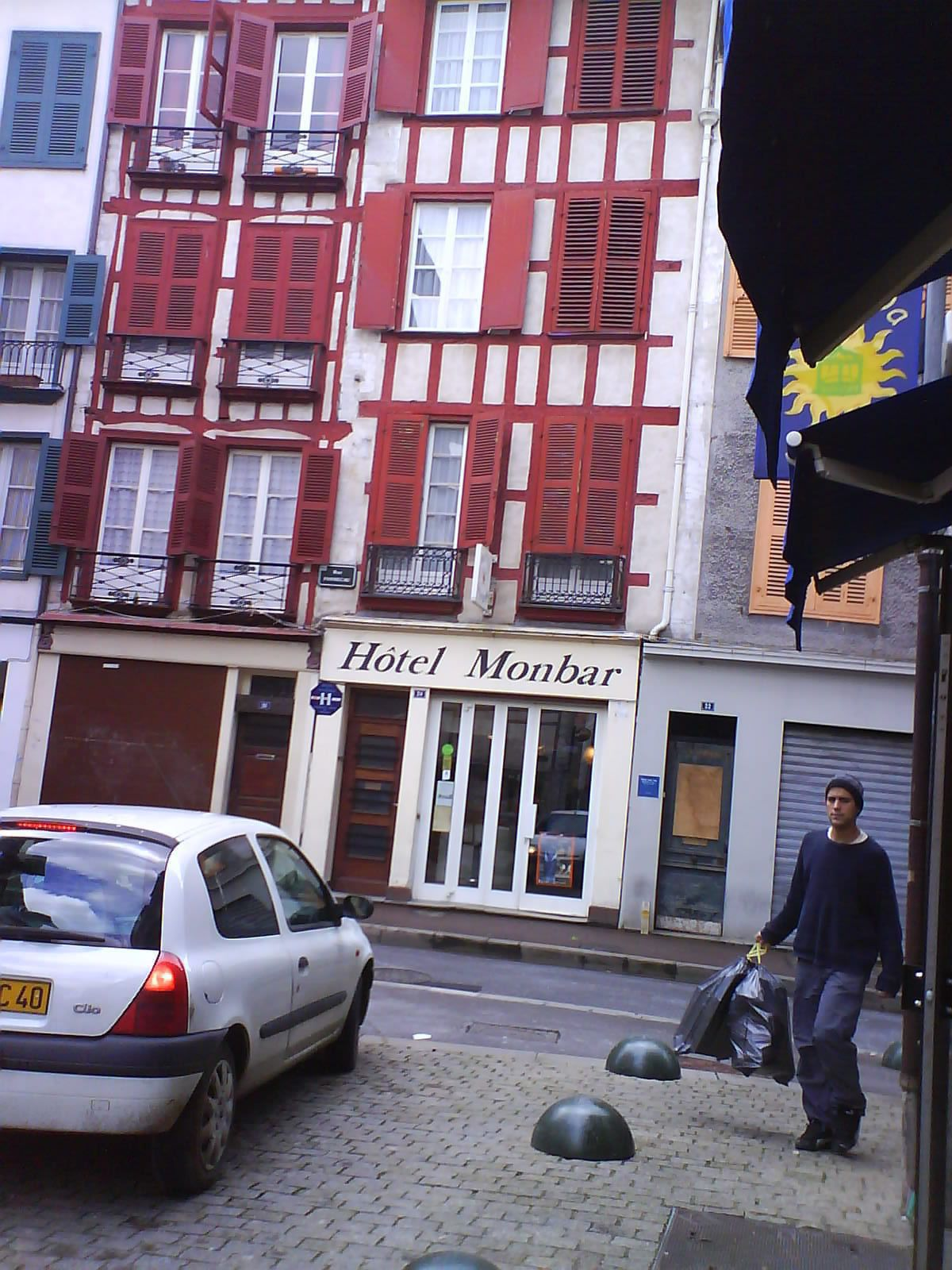
- Monbar Hotel in 2007
- Location: 43.489771°N 1.473178°W; Bayonne, Pyrénées-Atlantiques, France
- Date: 25 September 1985; 2115 (UTC+1)
- Target: ETA members
- Attack type: Mass shooting, terror attack
- Deaths: 4
- Injuries: 1
- Perpetrator: GAL

The Monbar Hotel attack was carried out by the Grupos Antiterroristas de Liberación (GAL), a Spanish state-sponsored death squad, on 25 September 1985 in Bayonne, Pyrénées-Atlantiques, France. The targets were four members of the Basque separatist terrorist group Euskadi Ta Askatasuna (ETA), whom the Spanish government believed to be senior figures in the organization, itself proscribed as a terrorist group in Spain and France. All four people were killed, with a fifth person, apparently unconnected to ETA, injured in the shooting. This represented the deadliest attack carried out by the GAL. Although two of the participants were apprehended shortly after the shooting, controversy surrounded the possible involvement of senior figures in the Spanish police.

This attack, and similar attacks carried out by the GAL, became a major issue during the 1996 Spanish general election after a supreme court trial established that the Spanish Interior Ministry had provided clandestine funding for the GAL. Spanish Interior Minister José Barrionuevo and his security chief, Rafael Vera, were jailed for ten years for sanctioning a kidnapping and misappropriation of public funds to finance the group, and the GAL scandal is seen as a key factor in the Spanish Socialist Workers' Party (PSOE) losing the election, though more senior figures in the PSOE, such as Felipe Gonzalez, denied knowledge and involvement.

== Background ==
The French Basque Country had been a haven of Euskadi Ta Askatasuna (ETA), an armed Basque separatist group, for decades. Since mid-1968, most of ETA's leadership had lived there and used it as a base for training, infrastructure and planning attacks. ETA commandos also operated from there, crossing the border into Spain to carry out attacks before fleeing back to France. This led to complaints in Spain that French authorities were not doing enough to tackle ETA activity, preferring to leave the Basque conflict to the Spanish to deal with.

As one of the larger cities in the French Basque Country, Bayonne had been one of the main bases of ETA. From 1975 onwards, this had prompted a reaction from anti-ETA groups. In April 1975, a Basque bookshop in Bayonne was bombed, though no one was injured. On 25 June 1979, Enrique Gómez Álvarez, an alleged ETA member, was killed by the Batallón Vasco Español (BVE), a right-wing paramilitary group active since 1975.

The BVE vanished after 1981 but, from 1983 onwards, the Grupos Antiterroristas de Liberación (GAL) began carrying out similar attacks and abductions. The first in Bayonne occurred on 17 October 1983, when alleged ETA members Joxe Lasa Arostegi and José Ignacio Zabala disappeared. Their mutilated bodies were found in Alicante in 1985. An unsuccessful kidnapping attempt occurred the following day and, in December, Ramón Oñaederra, an alleged ETA member, and Mikel Goikoetxea, an alleged ETA leader, were assassinated by the GAL in separate incidents. Prior to the Monbar attack, two people had been killed and six injured in three attacks in Bayonne in 1985.

== The targets ==
The targets of the attack were four members of ETA. According to the Spanish authorities, they had a long history within the organization.

- Ignacio Asteazunzarra (Beltza) had been arrested in 1973 in Loyola, but had been freed by other ETA militants at gunpoint. He was believed to have been part of a cell which had been particularly active in 1979 in attacks in the province of Álava. He had been granted refugee status by French authorities in 1984.
- José María Etxaniz (Potros) had begun activity in 1973. He had been arrested by Spanish police in 1975, along with twenty-one others, in connection with a large haul of guns and explosives discovered. Etxaniz had been arrested again by French police in 1984. He was the leader of ETA military in the Vitoria area, according to Spanish police sources.
- Agustin Irazustabarrena (Legra) belonged to the Sega cell of ETA military, according to Spanish police. He fled to France in 1982 and in 1984 he had been arrested by French police charged with possession of illegal weapons. Irazustabarrena's trial had still been pending at the time of his death. He was believed to be in charge of cross-border operations for ETA.
- José Sabino Etxaide had belonged to an information gathering cell of ETA. He had fled to France in 1982.

== The attack ==
The attack occurred at 21:15 on a Wednesday evening, as a football game featuring Spain and Iceland was being televised. The four participants exited their car carrying shotguns and machine guns and opened fire on the bar. The bullets shattered the skull of three of the victims and hit the fourth in the heart. Three of the targets were killed instantly, with the fourth dying shortly afterwards in hospital. A fifth person was injured after being hit in the foot, but survived the attack.

Three of the four attackers fled on foot through the streets of Bayonne. Pursued by a group of people who had witnessed the attack, two of them were caught and handed over to the French police, after having thrown their weapons into the river near the hotel. Those apprehended were Pierre Frugoli (12 April 1963 – 18 February 2023) and Lucien Mattei, both believed to be members of the Marseille underworld by French police. Police later retrieved two 9mm calibre pistols from the river. Their two accomplices in the attack managed to escape in a car, which was later found abandoned in San Sebastián.

The GAL claimed responsibility in a telephone call the day after the attack. For their part, ETA released a statement confirming that the four killed had belonged to their organization.

== Reactions ==
The Spanish Socialist Workers' Party (PSOE), at that time the governing party of Spain, condemned the incident as an attack on "the freedom of the Basque people". Their chairman in the Basque Country, Juan Manuel Eguiagaray, stated that he did not believe that the solution to ETA violence was to have similar terrorists trying to even the score. Euskadiko Ezkerra, the Communist Party of Spain and the People's Alliance also issued statements condemning the attack.

The following year, French interior minister Charles Pasqua accused the Spanish government of being behind attacks like the one at the Monbar hotel.

Street protests took place near the hotel on the night of the attack and the following day and were attended by up to 200 people. Herri Batasuna also organized protests against the incident, which at times resulted in street violence and arrests. They also organized a general strike in the Basque Country, though observance of this was limited to San Sebastián and the hometowns of those killed.

== Trials ==
The trial of Frugoli and Mattei opened on 30 November 1987 in Pau. Mattei, who had previously been released after serving one year of a 20-year sentence for armed assault, retracted his previous confession. Frugoli, however, acknowledged that he had set out to kill ETA members.

Frugoli stated that he had been recruited by two members of the Spanish secret services, codenamed "Francis" and "Miguel", at a bar in Marseille port. With Mattei, Frugoli made several trips to San Sebastián to receive instructions for the attack, the last at the Orly Hotel three days prior. Frugoli claimed that "Francis" had offered him 100,000 francs for carrying out the attack and 50,000 more for each person killed. "Francis" then met them in Bayonne, supplying them with the weapons used in the attack and the identities of the desired targets. Both Frugoli and Mattei identified "Francis" as José Amedo Fouce, a police sub-commissioner in Bilbao. Hotel records showed that Amedo had stayed in the Orly hotel at the same time as Frugoli and Mattei. The French judges issued an international arrest warrant for Amedo, whose spokesman denied the charges.

On 2 December 1987, both defendants were sentenced to life imprisonment, with a recommendation that Mattei should serve no less than eighteen years in prison. Frugoli's sentence was subsequently reduced to twenty years in prison. Their accomplices in the attack were never identified.

Lawyers for the prosecution suspected that "Miguel" was Michel Dominguez, a Spanish police officer of French origin who worked with Amedo. In April 1990, a waiter at Londres Hotel and a security employee at the Kursaal casino in San Sebastián both stated that they had seen Amedo and Dominguez on various occasions in the company of Mattei and other GAL mercenaries.

In March 1991, the case against Amedo and Dominguez in relation to the Monbar attack was dropped due to lack of evidence. However, in September 1991, both Amedo and Dominguez were sentenced to 108 years in prison for organizing other GAL attacks. In November 1994, Spanish High Court judge Baltasar Garzón reopened the case against both men for the Monbar attack. Subsequently, three others, Julián Sancristóbal, Juan Alberto Perote and Francisco Álvarez, were implicated in the case. Sancristóbal had been the former director of state security, Perote the former head of the Spanish secret service, and Álvarez had been head of the anti-terrorist squad. They all denied the accusations. The case was closed in October 2001, with Garzón declaring that, although suspicions remained about involvement of some of those accused, there was insufficient evidence to prosecute.

== Consequences ==
Author Paddy Woodworth argued that "the GAL campaign caused many French Basques to see the [Spanish Basque] refugees as causing a rapid decline in the local economy, especially the tourism business, as the news spread that the bars and boulevards of the region's coastal resorts were now the targets of a terrorist group." Consequently, the French authorities began to change their stance on the refugees, increasing cross-border cooperation with their Spanish counterparts. This involved deporting ETA members to various other countries and putting greater restrictions on those who remained.

As the Monbar case and others came to light, the GAL issue became increasingly controversial in the 1990s, with questions over whether members of the Spanish government and security services had known about the group's operations in places like Bayonne and, if so, to what extent they had supported and funded the attacks. This became a major issue during the 1996 Spanish general election with Spanish Interior Minister, José Barrionuevo, and his security chief, Rafael Vera, implicated in the GAL case. In 1998, both were jailed for ten years for sanctioning a kidnapping and misappropriation of public funds to finance the GAL. Along with various corruption scandals and the poor state of the Spanish economy in the mid-1990s, the GAL scandal is seen as a key factor in the PSOE's 1996 defeat.

== Bibliography ==
=== References ===
- Sullivan, John (1988). ETA and Basque Nationalism: The Flight from Euskadi, 1890–1986 (1988 ed.). Taylor & Francis. ISBN 9780415003667. - Total pages: 299
- Woodworth, Paddy (2001). Dirty War, Clean Hands: The Dark Side of the Spanish Democracy (2001 ed.). Cork University Press. ISBN 9781859182765. - Total pages: 472
