= Juan José Rosón =

Spanish politician (1932–1986)

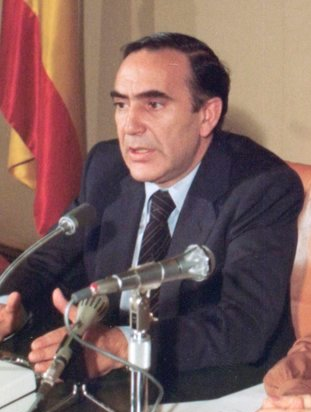

Minister of Interior
- In office 2 May 1980 – 3 December 1982
- Prime Minister: Adolfo Suarez; Leopoldo Calvo Sotelo
- Preceded by: Antonio Ibáñez Freire
- Succeeded by: José Barrionuevo

Personal details
- Born: Juan José Rosón Pérez; 25 September 1932 Becerreá, Lugo Province
- Died: 19 August 1986 (aged 53) Madrid
- Resting place: Mingorrubio Cemetery, Madrid
- Party: Union of the Democratic Centre
- Education: Universidad Complutense de Madrid

Juan José Rosón (25 September 1932 – 19 August 1986) was a Spanish politician and a member of the Union of the Democratic Centre (UCD). He served as the minister of interior from 1980 to 1982.

== Early life and education ==
Rosón was born in Becerreá, Lugo Province, on 25 September 1932. His family were of Galician origin. His brother, Antonio (died 1986), served as the president of the Parliament of Galicia and another, General Luis Rosón, survived an assassination attempt perpetrated by ETA in November 1984.

Juan held a bachelor's degree in political science and economics from the Complutense University of Madrid. He also studied at the Military School Intervention and obtained the title of military comptroller.

== Career ==
Rosón taught at the school attached to the Spanish radio television directorate (RTVE). Under the Franco administration he served as national director of education, secretary general of the Union of University Studies (SEU), director of the EFE and the president of the National Union. Later he became the general director of the RTVE in the 1960s. Then he was made governor of Madrid in the late 1970s when Rodolfo Martín Villa was interior minister. Both were the members of the UCD.

Rosón was appointed interior minister on 2 May 1980, replacing Antonio Ibáñez Freire in the post. His major initiative was to improve the role of the intelligence services and of the police and security forces in fighting against terrorist attacks under the unified command for the counter-terrorist effort. To this end he established a coordination unit for antiterrorist logistics, operations and intelligence, Mando Único para la Lucha Contraterrorista (Spanish: Single Command for the Counterterrorist Fight), in March 1981.

As a result of this effort, the number of the people died in the ETA attacks was reduced to 38 in 1981 and 44 in 1982 following the peak in 1980 with 124 dead. On the night of 1 October 1982, head of the Superior Center of Defense Information Emilio Alonso Manglano summoned Prime Minister Leopoldo Calvo-Sotelo, Minister of Defence Alberto Oliart and Juan José Rosón to a meeting. At that meeting, which lasted several hours, Manglano unveiled a coup d'état conspiracy that several military officials were preparing that was going to be especially bloody, and that was going to be executed on 27 October 1982, the day before the general election. After the meeting, the immediate arrest of the leaders was ordered and they were able to dismantle them on 2 October 1982.

Rosón was in office until 3 December 1982 after serving in the cabinet of two Prime Ministers, Adolfo Suarez and Leopoldo Calvo Sotelo. José Barrionuevo succeeded him as interior minister. Rosón advised Felipe González to appoint Barrionuevo as interior minister.

== Later years and death ==
Following the defeat of the UCD by the PSOE in the legislative elections of October 1982 Rosón retired from politics and dealt with business. He lived in Alicante, and was diagnosed with lung cancer in 1982. Along with other prominent former leaders of UCD he founded the Political Studies Club in November 1984.

He died of a heart attack in a Madrid clinic on 19 August 1986. He was buried at the cemetery of El Pardo in Madrid on 20 August.
