= Jean-Michel Caradec'h =

French journalist and writer (1950–2022)

Jean-Michel Caradec'h (22 March 1950 – 17 November 2022) was a French journalist and writer. He is the author of several books in association with personalities of show business, sports, and civil life. The originality of his style and the variety of the subjects handled are a direct continuation of his activity as journalist.

== Career ==
After studying clinical psychology (masters) at the University Paris Diderot, Jean-Michel Caradec'h worked as senior reporter for more than 25 years. He began his career in 1974, in the early days of the daily newspaper Libération. In 1979, he participated in the creation of the short-lived Paris-Hebdo, a city magazine launched in Paris by Jean-Louis Servan-Schreiber, before joining in 1980 the editorial staff of Paris Match, then directed by Roger Therond. For Paris Match he covered society issues, major news stories (Gregory affair) and conflicts worldwide (the wars in Lebanon, El Salvador, Chad, Iran-Iraq).

He received the Albert Londres Award in 1984 for his stories on Salvadoran guerrilla warfare. In 1987, he was in charge of the cover stories in the department of investigations of L'Express, where he published several scoops (sales of weapons to Iraq; sabotage of the Ariane rocket; hostages in Ouvéa; Greenpeace: Rainbow Warrior affair; French Doctors story). He was the only reporter admitted among the French Foreign Legion (Operation Daguet) during the operation Desert Storm in the Iraq invasion.

In 1992, he was named chief editor of VSD magazine in charge of the society and investigations department. In 1996, he became chief editor of L'Evènement du Jeudi directed by Jean-François Kahn. After L'Evènement du Jeudi closed down in 1999, he dedicated himself to writing signed or anonymous works for publishing houses. He is also the author of a reference inquiry on the death of Princess Diana (documentary for Channel 4 TV) and of two original film scenarios: Joséphine and Marie-Antoinette produced by Gallery TV for French television.

== Publications ==
- Paris-Dakar. Une histoire d'hommes. Hubert Auriol, Cyril Neveu. Fixot.1987; ISBN 978-2-87645-029-5
- Une Odysée Cambodgienne. Ngor Haing, Roger Warner. Fixot.1989; ISBN 978-2-87645-035-6
- La Morale et l'Action. Philippe Legorjus. Fixot.1994; ISBN 978-2-87645-077-6
- Mesrine, la chasse à l'homme. Lucien Aimé-Blanc. Plon. 2002. ISBN 978-2-259-19706-9
- Maintenant, il faudra tout se dire. Benjamin Castaldi. Albin Michel.2004; ISBN 978-2-226-16297-7
- L'Indic et le commissaire. Lucien Aimé-Blanc. Plon. 2006; ISBN 978-2-259-19848-6
- Caradec'h, Jean-Michel (2006). Lady Diana : L'enquete criminelle. Neuilly-sur-Seine: Lafon. ISBN 9782749904795. OCLC 70874672.
- Annie Girardot. La mémoire de ma mère. Giulia Salvatori. Éditions Michel Lafon.2007; ISBN 978-2-7499-0647-8
- Le silence des autres. Lydia Gouardo. Éditions Michel Lafon.2008. ISBN 978-2-7499-0795-6
- Prisonnier à Guantanamo. Mollah Abdul Salam Zaeef. EGDV Documents.2008. ISBN 978-2-84267-945-3
- D'Artagnan à New-York. Ariane Daguin. Editions Grasset 2010. ISBN 978-2-246-71761-4
- L'assaut. Le GIGN au coeur de l'action. Roland Môntins. Oh Editions. 2010. ISBN 978-2-915056-76-1
- La couleur des souvenirs. Jean-Pierre Foucault. Albin-Michel. 2012. ISBN 978-2-226-22096-7

== See also ==
- Albert Londres
- Benjamin Castaldi
- Lucien Aimé-Blanc
- Jacques Mesrine
- Ben Barka
- Liberation
- Guantanamo Bay detention camp
- Abdul Salam Zaeef
