= Bernard Fixot =

French publisher

- Born: October 6, 1943 (age 81); Villejuif, France
- Occupation: Publisher
- Years active: c. 1960—present
- Spouse: Valérie-Anne Giscard d'Estaing

Bernard Fixot (born 6 October 1943) is a French publisher, publishing house founder, and chairman of XO Éditions and Bernard Fixot LLC. Prior to XO Éditions, Fixot spent the majority of his publishing career in a variety of roles with Hachette, where he started working at age 17.

== Early life ==
Bernard Fixot was born in Villejuif, France to a Breton family. His father was an officer with the Gentilly police and his mother worked as a receptionist in a factory. He grew up in Arcueil, a southern suburb of Paris and later attended school in Bagneux. Fixot briefly attended Lycée Henri-IV in Paris but eventually dropped out to pursue publishing. As such, his highest degree is the Certificat d'études primaires. He later learned that Madame Tap, the schoolteacher who taught him to read, also taught French writer Jean Teulé (The Suicide Shop) and fashion designer Jean-Paul Gaultier.

Fixot began working in the stockroom at Hachette at age 17. After completing his military service, he returned to the company as a sales representative for the mass market paperback division, Le Livre de Poche, where he remained for two years. He also worked for the Gallimard account, then part of the Hachette Group.

== Career ==
In 1969, after nearly ten years, Fixot left Hachette to become an independent sales representative. Éditions Gallimard split from Hachette the same year and offered him a job as a sales executive. He accepted and worked first as a sales manager, then a sales director, for the Gallimard Group, including Denoël and Mercure de France. There, he oversaw the creation of Gallimard's sales force and took part in the launch of both the mass market imprint Folio as well as the creation of the children's division, Gallimard Jeunesse. He spent seven years with the company and left once the sales and distribution areas he oversaw were autonomous and successful.

In 1978, he was asked by Hachette, then run by Jacques Marchandise and Gérard Worms, to return to the company to restructure the sales department. They also wanted him to create Éditions n°1, the first partnership that combined a traditional publisher like Hachette with a media group, in this case Europe 1 radio. He accepted this agreement on the condition that he would be able to start his own publishing house, a 50/50 split with Hachette, two years later. Edition n°1's major publications included The Guinness Book of World Records and works by Pierre Bellemare and Paul-Loup Sulitzer. Alongside Bernard Barrault, he established Éditions BFB, which published authors such as Sylvie Caster and Philippe Djian.

Jean-Luc Lagardère purchased the Hachette Group in 1983 and asked Fixot to become branch manager for the mass market division, including the paperback and children's departments he had historically overseen, while continuing to run his own two publishing houses. Fixot used this opportunity to start a contest seeking a graphic designer to modernize the mass market paperback book covers. These updated covers, created by a young drafted soldier, were used to create the Biblio collection. Fixot also revived Hachette's Bibliothèque Rose and Bibliothèque Verte children's collections.

In 1984, he started the Les grands écrivains (The Great Writers) collection, which saw novels being sold with the addition of a magazine about the author's life. This was done in conjugation with the Filipacchi Press Group and Europe 1. This venture, supported by Académie Goncourt, sought to encourage the general public to take an interest in literature. One hundred of these magazine-book combos were produced and more than 10 million copies were sold within two years. In 1987, this same team launched Les grands peintres (The Great Painters), which launched with a contest where the first prize was an original Renoir painting.

Around this time, at Pierre Barret's request, he became the Managing Director of Publicity and Shows for Europe 1. He hosted one-hour weekly shows with Michel Drucker about the life of a writer.

Fixot again left Hachette after a disagreement with Jean-Claude Lattès, Managing Director of Hachette Livre. He established his own independent publishing house, Éditions Fixot, which focused on nonfiction works. His team was composed of managing director Antoine Audouard, editorial director Anne Gallimard, financial director Edith Lebond, and foreign rights manager Susanna Lea. The house's first major success was Not without My Daughter by Betty Mahmoody, which had already been rejected by a number of other publishers. Fixot and his team managed to sell 3.5 million copies in France alone; the book was also adapted into a film directed by Brian Gilbert and starring Sally Field in the titular role.

Among Éditions Fixot's other publications were The Swan Dive, the first autobiography in France by a transgender author, by Maud Marin; Seule tout en haut à droite, an autobiography of the first female deputy in the National Front, by Yann Piat; and J'avais 12 ans, the first major French narrative about incest, by Nathalie Schweighoffer. Zana Muhsen, Tehmina Durrani, Mano Dayak, José Luis de Vilallonga, Jean-Jacques Servan-Schreiber, and Eddie Vartan were also published. Fixot continued his Les grands écrivains collection and in 1992 created the Bibliothèque collection, which aimed to provide non-readers with condensed versions of French literature. Stendhal's The Red and the Black has 45 full chapters in its original form and 19 full and 26 summarized chapters in the Bibliothèque version. The collection was roundly criticized by the French press.

In 1988, Fixot founded TF1 Éditions, where he published books linked to programs broadcast by the television station of the same name. This included cookbooks by Joël Robuchon, host of Cuisinez comme un grand chef, and novelizations of soap operas. In 1990, Fixot and Berlitz launched a successful foreign language collection geared towards French speakers. This collection included Yes, I can for English; Si, yo puedo for Spanish; and Si, io posso for Italian.

In 1993, Fixot was asked to take over Éditions Robert Laffont after Laffont stepped down for health reasons. Fixot subsequently merged Éditions Fixot with Editions Robert Laffont. The publishing house again became one of the top trade publisher in France over the next six years after faltering under the ill Laffont, due in part to the resurgence of the historical novel, including publications of the five-volume Ramses by Christian Jacq and the four-volume Napoleon by Max Gallo. Works by Barbara Samson, Zlata Filipovic, and Phoolan Devi, all stories that fall within Éditions Fixot's routine selections, were also published. The controversial Black Book of Communism was published in 1997.

Once his seven-year contract with Éditions Robert Laffont came to an end in 1999, Fixot started XO Éditions with former Éditions Fixot colleague Edith Leblond and the Editis Publishing Group. XO limits its production to 15-20 titles a year in the interest of pouring additional resources into optimizing sales. The house focuses on discovering new talent and making French writers nationally recognized best-selling authors. Those on XO's publishing roster include Christian Jacq, Mireille Calmel, José Frèches, Farah Pahlavi, Guillaume Musso, and Ingrid Betancourt. XO's offices are located in Tour Montparnasse.

In 2002, Fixot and Leblond created Philippe Robinet Oh! Éditions, a publishing house that publishes both fiction and nonfiction about women. Examples of topics include honor killings, forced marriage, and domestic violence, which often center on the abuse of women, as well as how issues such as alcoholism, anorexia, and homelessness affect women. In 2013, Fixot started Bernard Fixot LLC in Los Angeles to sell movie and TV adaptation rights for books published by XO.

== Honours ==
- Officier of the Ordre des Arts et des Lettres
- Chevalier of the Ordre des Palmes académiques
- Chevalier of the Légion d'Honneur
- Officier of the Ordre national du Mérite

== Personal life ==
In 1987, Fixot married art dealer Valérie-Anne Giscard d'Estaing, daughter of Valéry Giscard d'Estaing and his widow Anne-Aymone. She is the owner of the Photo 12 Gallery in Paris and Fine Photographs in Santa Monica, California. The couple have two children, Guillaume and Iris.
