= Andrew Crofts =

Andrew Crofts may refer to:

- Andrew Crofts (author) (born 1953), British author
- Andrew Crofts (footballer) (born 1984), Wales international footballer
- Andy Crofts (born 1977), English musician, singer-songwriter and photographer

== See also ==
- Andrew Croft (disambiguation)
