= Maione =

Maione is a surname most prevalent in the Italian regions Campania, Lazio and Calabria. In Calabria a toponymic origin of the name (frazione Maione of Altilia comune in Cosenza province) is suggested. Notable people with the surname include:

- Gia Maione (1941–2013), American singer
- Harry Maione (1908–1942), American mobster
- Jean-Pierre Maïone-Libaude (died 1982), French veteran of the Algerian War
- Mathew Maione (born 1990), Canadian ice hockey player
