= Pierre Goldman =

French academic

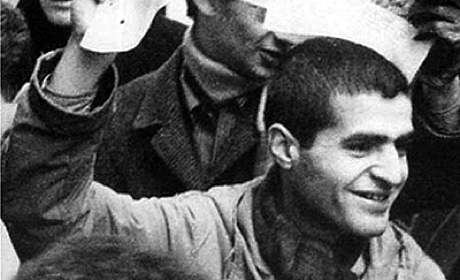
Pierre Goldman

Pierre Goldman (French: [pjɛʁ ɡɔldman]; 22 June 1944 – 20 September 1979) was a French left-wing intellectual who was convicted of several robberies and mysteriously assassinated. It has been suspected that the Spanish death squads GAL were involved in his murder. His half-brother Jean-Jacques Goldman is a popular French singer.

== Biography ==
Pierre Goldman was born in Lyon in France on 22 June 1944, near the end of World War II. He was born to a Jewish family of Polish-Jewish descent; his father Alter Mojze Goldman and mother Janine Sochaczewska were active in the FTP-MOI Resistance movement. After the liberation of France, his parents separated, and his father, in concert with a group of former FTP-MOI members, kidnapped him. At the time, Alter said that he took Pierre so that he would not grow up in the country, Poland, that had seen the elimination of so many Jews, to which Pierre's mother was returning. Thereafter, he had only sporadic contact with his mother.

Though he was expelled from various high schools and boarding schools, Goldman obtained his baccalauréat and pursued courses at the Sorbonne as an independent auditor. He joined the Union of Communist Students in 1963. In 1966, he refused to do his compulsory military service, and travelled to Cuba instead, where he heard Fidel Castro speak at the Tricontinental Conference in January 1966. Still in Havana for the funerary events after Che Guevara's death, he met a number of Venezuelan guerrilleros through intermediary Régis Debray.

Returning to Paris, he stayed aloof from May '68 activism. In June 1968 he returned to Venezuela and spent a year there in guerrilla activities. On 11 June 1969, after their attack on an arms depot, his group withdrew into the sierra, and then lost all support from Cuba which rallied to the Venezuelan government's side. Goldman then robbed the Royal Bank of Canada in Puerto La Cruz on 11 June 1969, taking 2.6 million bolívars (the biggest hold-up of that year), a robbery later claimed by the FALN guerrillas. Of his comrades, only Goldman was not identified, fleeing in September to Paris.

Having soon spent his remaining money, he staged several robberies of small businesses in December 1969 and January 1970. During this period, he reportedly considered kidnapping writer Jean-Edern Hallier, whom he disliked profoundly. In 1974, he was given a life-sentence by the Paris cour d'assises after being convicted of a bloody robbery on 19 December 1969 on the Boulevard Richard-Lenoir, in which two pharmacists were killed. He denied having committed the robbery, although he admitted having conducted three earlier robberies. He was sentenced to 12 years in prison for the other three robberies and given a life sentence for the December 1969 murders.

During the five years he spent in prison, he studied philosophy and Spanish, and wrote a book on his own case, Souvenirs obscurs d'un juif polonais né en France (Obscure Memories of a Polish Jew Born in France), published in 1975. The impact of the book on some French intellectuals and personalities, including the actress Simone Signoret, the writer Françoise Sagan, Jean-Paul Sartre and Régis Debray, among others, plus many inconsistencies recorded during the investigation, led to a second trial, which started on 26 April 1976. He was acquitted and freed in October 1976. Afterward, he contributed to left-wing newspapers, joining the Temps Modernes and Libération.

== Assassination ==
On 20 September 1979, Goldman was assassinated, shot at point-blank range in Paris. Eyewitnesses described seeing three Spanish-looking persons. The police first suspected the Mafia; however, the murder was claimed by (according to AFP) an unknown far-right group: Honneur de la police (Honour of the Police). Goldman's funeral was attended by 15,000 people. A few hours after his death, his wife Christiane gave birth to a son, Manuel.

The perpetrators of Goldman's murder have not been found. Various theories persist, the most serious pointing to Marseille's criminal underground, which might have assassinated him on behalf of the mercenary organization GAL, a death squad set up by Spanish officials to fight ETA in the 1980s. Goldman was allegedly helping the ETA to procure weapons and planned to create an organization to fight the GAL. Another theory shared by VSD points toward the French intelligence services — supported by the fact that former police officer Lucien Aimé-Blanc, in charge of the narcotics department, noted the presence of a SDECE officer at the scene.

In April 2006, Libération published an interview of said former police officer, who stated that one of his informants, Jean-Pierre Maïone, had admitted a few years later to having killed Goldman on behalf of the GAL:

Marseille boys members of GAL killed him with Maïone, who also talked about a commandant, former member of the SDECE [French secret service], without revealing me his identity.

On 22 May 2012, a blog post from lemonde.fr identified the killer of Pierre Goldman as René Resciniti de Says. A former paratrooper for the French Armed Forces, Resciniti de Says was known as René l'élégant and died on 17 April 2012 at the age of 61. Goldman's assassin had previously been identified under the pseudonym “Gustavo” by documentarian Michel Despratx in 2010. Extreme right journalist Emmanuel Ratier, in the bimonthly newsletter Faits et Documents, claims the true identity of “Gustavo” to have been René Resciniti de Says. The blog post alleges that René Resciniti de Says was an associate of French monarchist group Action Française, as well as being one of Bob Denard's mercenaries.

Gustavo, the 2010 Michel Despratx documentary broadcast by Canal+, states Goldman was assassinated by a four-person commando squad which included an inspector of the Direction de la surveillance du territoire (DST) and a police officer of the Direction centrale des renseignements généraux (RG). Nevertheless, as pointed out by the blog post, “Gustavo”'s testimony and his identification as René Resciniti de Says remain to be corroborated.

== Film ==
The Goldman Case, released in 2023, is based on Goldman's 1976 retrial for murder.

== Bibliography ==
- Souvenirs obscurs d'un juif polonais né en France, Le Seuil, 1975.
- L'ordinaire mésaventure d'Archibald Rapoport, 1977.
