= Lasa eta Zabala =

- Film poster
- Spanish: Lasa y Zabala
- Directed by: Pablo Malo
- Written by: Joanes Urkixo
- Music by: Pascal Gaigne
- Release date: September 25, 2014 (Donostia-San Sebastián)
- Running time: 107 minutes
- Country: Spain France
- Language: Basque

Lasa eta Zabala is a 2014 Basque film directed by Pablo Malo regarding the killing of Lasa and Zabala.

== Plot ==
The film depicts the kidnapping, torture and murder of Lasa and Zabala.
