= Andrew Croft (disambiguation) =

Andrew Croft may refer to:

- Andrew Croft, explorer
- Andy Croft, writer
- Andrew A. Croft, US Air Force general

== See also ==
- Andrew Crofts (disambiguation)
