= 1976 Vitoria massacre =

1976 massacre in the Basque Country

Coordinates: 42.8558°N 2.6689°W

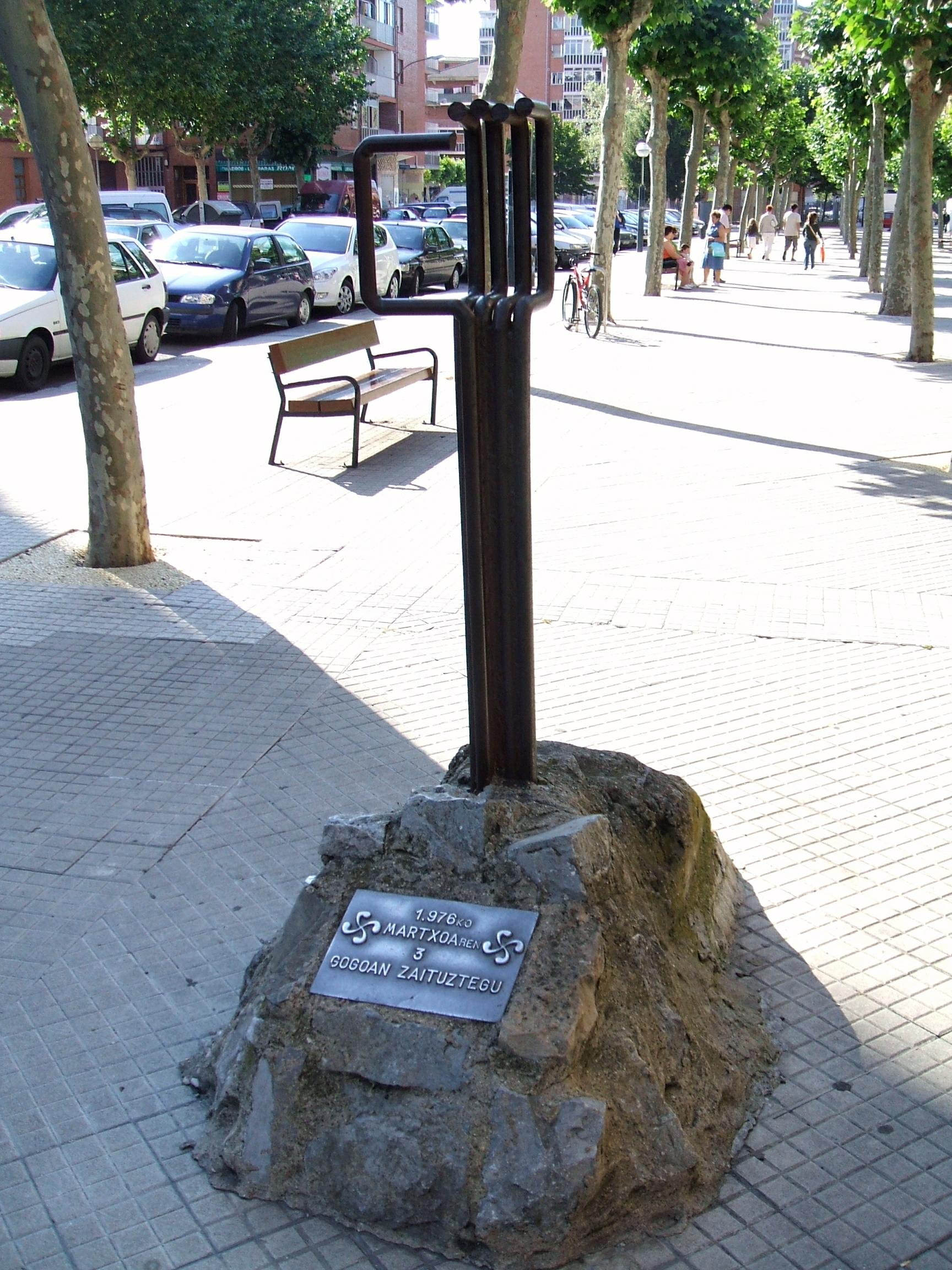
Monument to the victims of the March 3, 1976, in the street Bernal Díaz de Luco, in front of the parish of San Francisco de Asís. It was built in 1986.

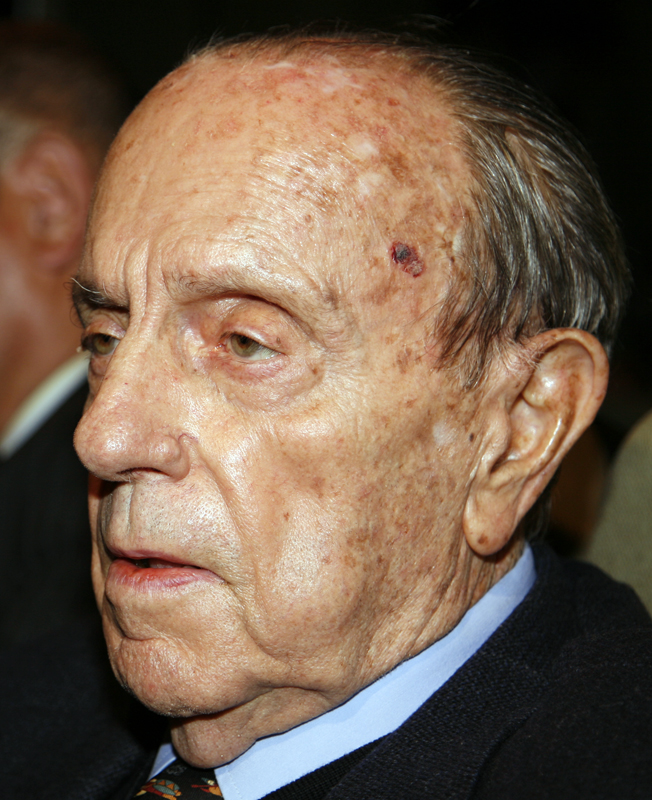
Manuel Fraga Iribarne, minister of the interior in 1976 (photography of 2007)

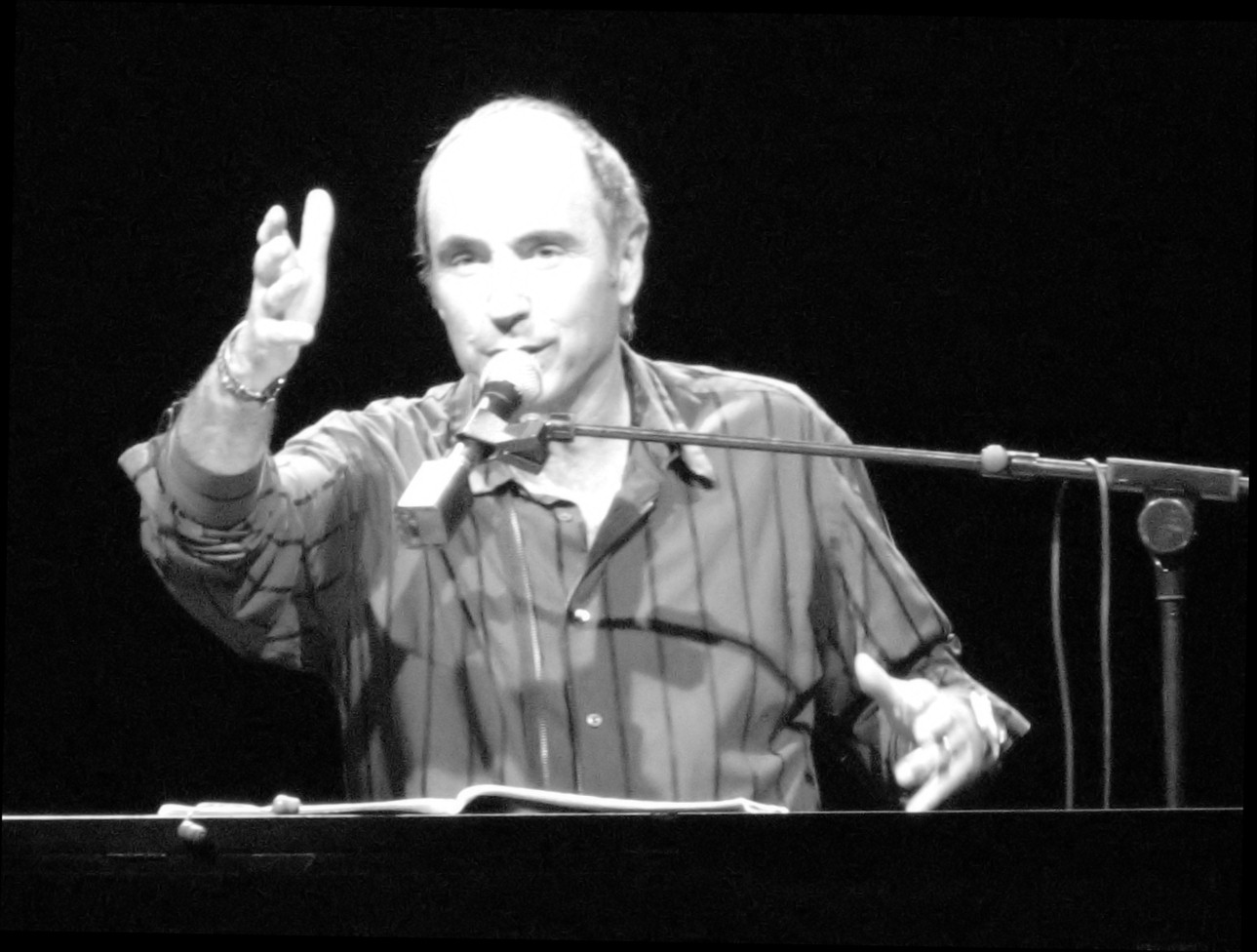
Lluís Llach in the Olympia of Paris

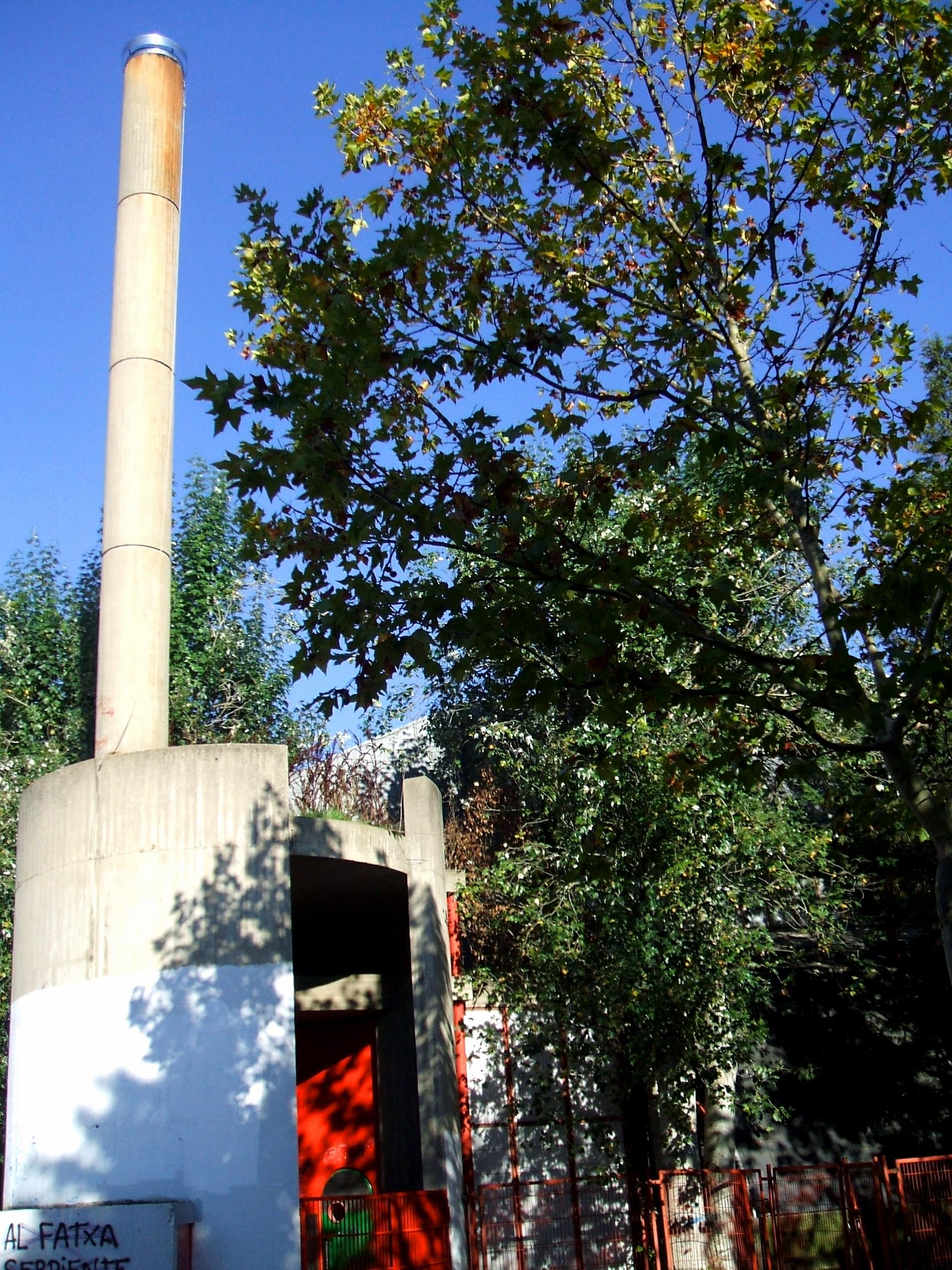
Entrance to the parish of San Francisco de Asís.

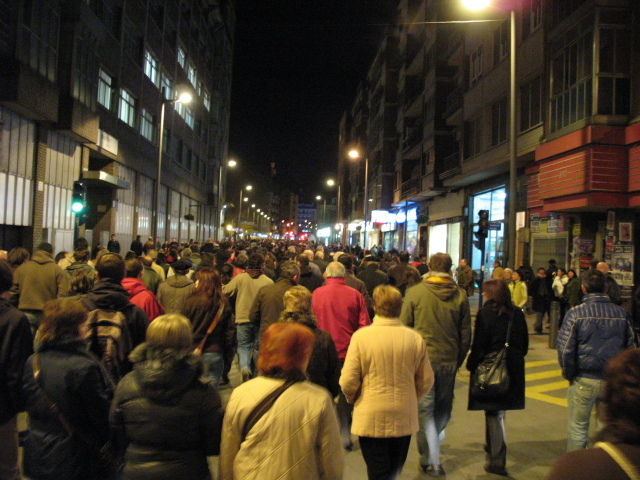
Demonstration in Vitoria-Gasteiz in 2009 in commemoration of the victims of 1976

On March 3, 1976, the Spanish Armed Police Corps used tear gas to force striking workers out of the parish church of San Francisco de Asís in the Basque capital of Vitoria-Gasteiz (Spanish; Vitoria). As the workers left the church, they were shot by police, resulting in five dead and 150 injured with gunshot wounds. The same police later described the events as a massacre.

The event inspired Lluís Llach to write the celebrated song Campanades a morts.

== Background ==
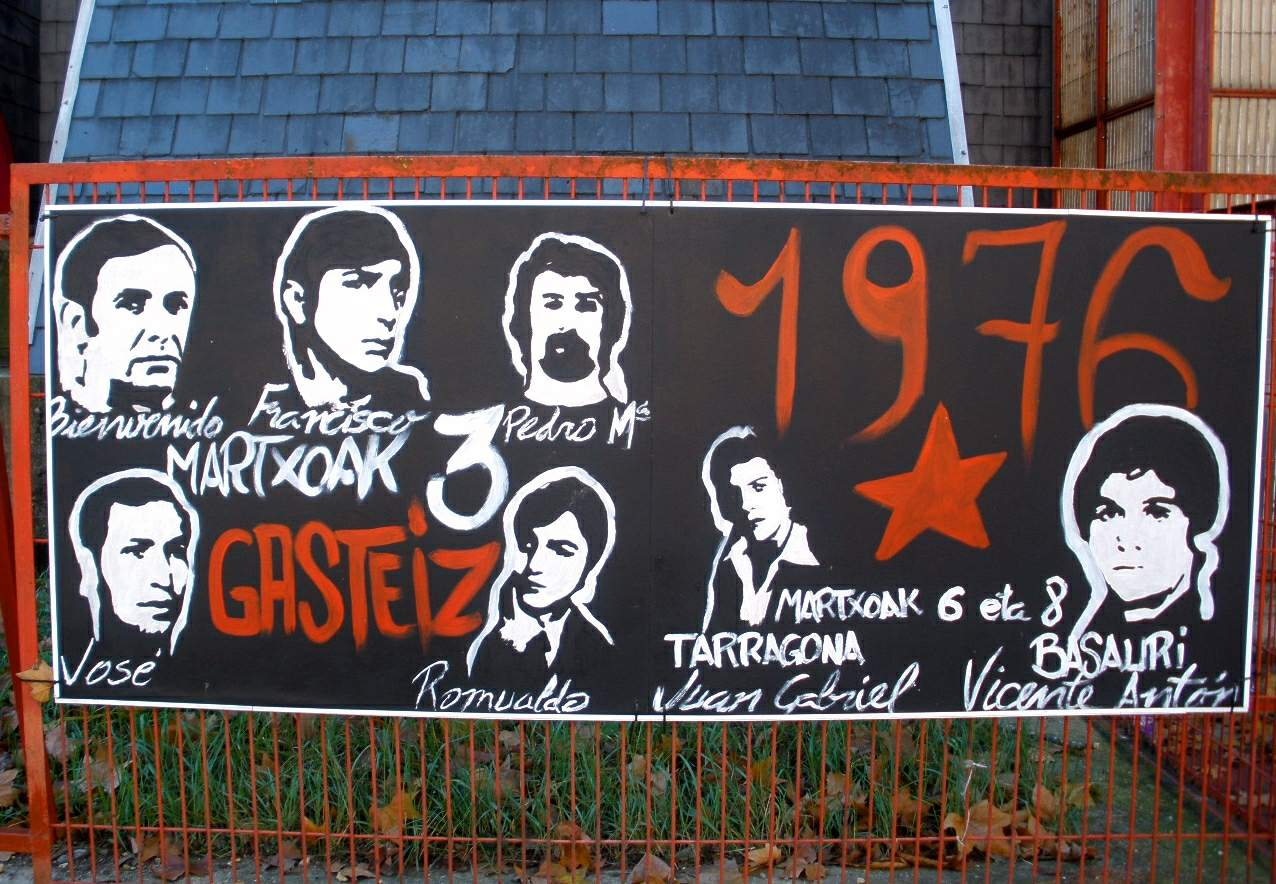
Hommage to the dead in 2014.

In January 1976, some six thousand workers initiated a strike against the decree to limit wage increases for better working conditions and against a decree to limit wage increases. Two months later, they called for the third time for a general strike, massively followed on 3 March. That same day armed police entered the Church of San Francisco in Vitoria-Gasteiz, where workers were gathering. The police asked them to leave despite the opposition of the priest and the agreement signed by the Catholic Church and the Spanish Government stating that police were not to enter any churches by force. Just a few seconds later, the police used tear gas inside the church, which was crowded. As suffocating workers tried to escape, they were beaten and shot.

Pedro María Martínez Ocio, 27, Francisco Aznar Clemente, 17, Romualdo Barroso Chaparro, 19, and José Castillo, 32, were killed. Bienvenido Pereda died later. Hundreds more were injured, many by gunshot wounds.

That week Manuel Fraga Iribarne, then Home Minister and founder of the Spanish Conservative Party, Rodolfo Martín Villa, Minister of Unions and General Campano, director of the Civil Guard, visited some of the injured to minimize criticism. The leader of the Social Democratic Party of Germany (SPD), cancelled a meeting with Fraga.

== Consequences ==
Those incidents fueled the action of the democratic opposition and their coordination. The Democratic Junta of Spain and the Platform of Convergence merged into the Democratic Coordination or Platajunta on 26 of March. This new board exerted more political pressure on the government, demanding amnesty, freedom for unions and democracy, and denouncing cosmetic reforms. Manuel Fraga Iribarne and Martín Villa are considered responsible for the massacre.

The events also showed once again that the Catholic Church no longer supported the dictatorship and in some aspects was much closer to workers' demands.

== Reparation and recognition of the victims ==
After the investiture of José Luis Rodríguez Zapatero to the presidency of the Spanish government, the group of the Basque Nationalist Party in the Senate issued a question enquiring about the events and calling for an investigation.

In 2006, the law of Historical Memory considered the victims to be victims of the dictatorship, even though this happened five months after Francisco Franco's death in November 1975. However, by February 2008, no political responsibilities had been determined, with the Spanish Conservative Party (PP) opposing a public appearance of Manuel Fraga and Rodolfo Martin Villa, Ministers at the time of the event, to face questioning on the matter.

On March 3, 2006, Lluís Llach sang Campanades a Mort, a song that gave name to a disc inspired by the massacre of 3 March in Vitoria-Gasteiz in the very same city. In February 2016 the mayor of Vitoria-Gasteiz tried to honour the Catalan singer-songwriter declaring him adopted son of the Basque capital but the local council members of the Spanish Socialist Workers' Party and the Conservatives made it impossible.

== The police recording ==
The police recording showing how the police were very much aware of what was going on and in fact planned the shooting of workers shocked many in Spain and elsewhere.
