= Antonio Ibáñez Freire =

Spanish politician and military commander

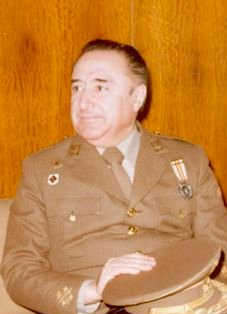

Minister of the Interior of Spain
- In office 1979–1980
- Appointed by: Adolfo Suárez
- Preceded by: Rodolfo Martín
- Succeeded by: Juan José Rosón

Personal details
- Born: Vitoria, Spain; 25 September 1913
- Died: 9 May 2003 (aged 89)

Antonio Ibáñez Freire (25 September 1913 – 9 May 2003) was a Spanish politician and military commander. He was minister of the interior of Spain from April 1979 to May 1980.

== Biography ==
He was born in Vitoria. After passing the Military Academy of Zaragoza, he was appointed lieutenant of infantry and participated in the Spanish Civil War revolting against the Second Spanish Republic. Later, he enlisted as a volunteer in the Blue Division taking part in the Second World War, in which he was awarded the Iron Cross by Nazi Germany. He was civil governor of the province of Santander in 1960 and occupied the same position in Vizcaya (1961) and Barcelona (1963).

In 1978, he was appointed Captain General of the Fourth Military Region. In April 1979, he was appointed minister of interior to the cabinet led by prime minister Adolfo Suárez. Freire replaced Rodolfo Martín as interior minister. Freire was in office until May 1980 and Juan José Rosón replaced him in the post.

== Awards and decorations ==
- Military Medal (Spain), Individual and Collective awards
- Grand Cross of the Order of Charles III
- Grand Cross of the Royal and Military Order of Saint Hermenegild
- Grand Cross of Military Merit
- Grand Cross of Naval Merit
- Grand Cross of Aeronautical Merit
- Grand Cross of the Order of Isabella the Catholic
- Grand Cross of the Order of Cisneros
- Grand Cross of the Imperial Order of the Yoke and Arrows
- Grand Cross of the Order of the Holy Sepulchre
- Great Star of Military Merit of the Chilean Army
- Grand Cross of the Order of Ruben Dario (Nicaragua).
- Medal of Suffering for the country
- Gold Medal of the city of Bilbao
- Gold Medal of the city of Barcelona
- Iron Cross of 1939, 2nd class

Preceded by Rodolfo Martín	Interior Minister of Spain; 1979–1980	Succeeded by Juan José Rosón
