= Lucien Aimé-Blanc =

French police officer (1935–2020)

Lucien Aimé-Blanc (23 March 1935 – 19 February 2020) was a French police officer. Born in Marseille, he became vice chief of staff of the Research and Intervention Brigade (BRI) and also of the Narcotics brigade. He led the Office central de répression du banditisme (OCRB).

Lucien Aimé-Blanc revealed in L'Indic et le Commissaire (2006) that left-wing activist Pierre Goldman had been assassinated on 20 September 1979 by a commando of the GAL, a Spanish assassination squad, led by Jean-Pierre Maïone. According to Aimé-Blanc, Henri Curiel, an anti-colonialist opposed to French Algeria may also have been the victim of the same Jean-Pierre Maïone, who was his informant for years.

== Bibliography ==
- Lucien Aimé-Blanc, and Jean-Michel Caradec'h. L'Indic et le Commissaire (Plon, 2006)
