= José Barrionuevo =

Spanish politician (born 1942)

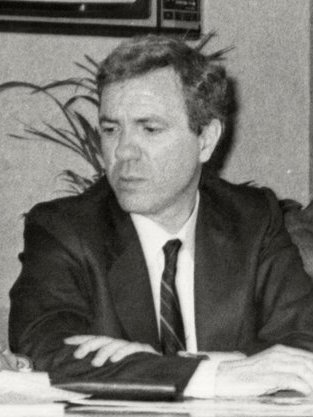
- Barrionuevo in March 1986

Minister of Interior
- In office 3 December 1982 – 12 July 1988
- Prime Minister: Felipe González
- Preceded by: Juan José Rosón
- Succeeded by: José Luis Corcuera

Personal details
- Born: José Barrionuevo Peña; 13 March 1942 (age 84) Berja, Spain
- Party: Socialist Workers' Party

José Barrionuevo (born 13 March 1942) is a Spanish former politician. He was the minister of interior from 1982 to 1988. He was jailed from 1998 to 2001 due to his involvement actions against ETA members in the Basque Conflict.

== Early life and education ==
Barrionuevo was born in Berja near Almería in 1942. He obtained bachelor degrees in law and journalism.

== Career and activities ==
Barrionuevo was a member of the pro-Franco student union where he likely met Rodolfo Martín Villa, then interior minister. Barrionuevo became a member of the Socialist Workers' Party. He served as deputy mayor of Madrid and was in charge of the municipal police.

Barrionuevo was a member of the Parliament representing Madrid for four terms in the legislatures of III, IV, V, and VI. He was appointed interior minister on 3 December 1982 in the first government of Prime Minister Felipe Gonzalez. He succeeded Juan José Rosón in the post. It was Rosón who advised Gonzalez to appoint Barrionuevo as interior minister.

Barrionuevo followed the security policies set by his predecessor. However, in early 1983 he and other security officials created a new operational strategy known as Plan Zona Especial Norte (Spanish: Plan ZEN, Plan Special Zone North) to reduce and eliminate the effects of the separatist group ETA in the Basque region. Two former interior ministers, namely Rodolfo Martín Villa and Juan José Rosón, also involved in the development of the plan. In addition, Barrionuevo consolidated the police forces forming a security secretariat.

Barrionuevo was in office until 12 July 1988 when José Luis Corcuera replaced him as interior minister in a cabinet reshuffle. Barrionuevo became the minister of transport, tourism and communications in the same reshuffle. Barrionuevo was among the classical social democrats like José Maravall, Javier Solana and Joaquín Almunia who served as a minority group in the cabinets led by Prime Minister Felipe Gonzalez.

== Controversy ==
Barrionuevo was unpopular during his tenure as interior minister due to his harsh and violent policies against Basque separatists. In May 1994, newly appointed interior minister Juan Alberto Belloch, who was also justice minister in the cabinet of Felipe González, began to reorganize the ministry of interior. A network, later called GAL (Grupos Antiterroristas de Liberación), was discovered as a result of his efforts. Unnamed "authorities" subsequently identified the GAL as "a front for security forces and hired assassins paid with secret government funds."

In addition, on 16 December 1994, two policemen met Judge Baltasar Garzón and told him that Barrionuevo and other senior officials had links to a ""Dirty War"" against separatists. Based on these statements Barrionuevo and other former security officials were tried in 1996 and "accused of funding and directing more than two dozen murders" of separatists during the 1980s.

On 24 January 1996, he and his former deputy Rafael Vera were found guilty and sentenced to ten years in prison on charges of their involvement in a "Dirty War" against the ETA. They were imprisoned on 29 July 1998. Therefore, their memberships to the GAL was legally established. However, they have denied the charges, but in 2022 admitted to having ordered the release of Segundo Marey, kidnapped by GAL police operatives under his command.

Barrionuevo and Vera were accompanied and hugged by González on their way to prison, where they served a three-month term. They were pardoned in 2001. In September 2001 Barrionuevo was again tried for his misuse the public funds which occurred in 1993. José Luis Corcuera, who succeeded him as interior minister, was also tried with him. Both were found innocent of embezzlement charges in January 2002.

== Personal life ==
Barrionuevo is married and has three children.
