= Marey affair =

1983 kidnapping of Segundo Marey by Spanish paramilitary groups

Kidnapping of Segundo Marey
- Court: Supreme Court of Spain
- Decided: 29 July 1998
- Transcript: Full text of the decision (in Spanish)

Court membership
- Judges sitting: Baltasar Garzón, Eduardo Móner

Keywords
- Kidnapping, GAL

Marey case is the name given to the trial for the 1983 kidnapping of Segundo Marey—one of the first victims of the Spanish government's dirty war against ETA—carried out by the so-called Grupos Antiterroristas de Liberación (GAL). (Note: English: Antiterrorist Liberation Groups)

== The kidnapping of Segundo Marey ==
On 4 December 1983, mercenaries Mohand Talbi, Jean-Pierre Échalier, and Pedro Sánchez—who had been hired with fondos reservados (Note: English: reserved funds; also known as black budget) from the Ministry of the Interior—kidnapped Segundo Marey from his home in Hendaye, mistaking him for alleged ETA leader Mikel Lujua. Segundo Marey, who was born in 1932 and died in 2001, had no ties to ETA. He was a 51-year-old office furniture salesman, son of a socialist who had been exiled to France in 1936.

At the time of the kidnapping, both Marey and his wife were sprayed with tear gas and beaten. Marey was taken by car to the town of Dantxarinea, in the province of Navarre, where a group of police officers under the orders of Deputy Commissioner José Amedo was waiting. The officers took him to a cabin in the village of Matienzo, in the province of Cantabria, where he remained locked up for ten days, with his head covered with a hood, until he was released in French territory, three kilometers from the Dantxarinea border crossing.

The goal of the kidnappers was to exert pressure on the French authorities to release police inspector Jesús Alfredo Gutiérrez Argüelles and three police officers of the Grupo Especial de Operaciones (GEO), (Note: English: Special Group of Operations) who had been arrested in the French commune of Pau on 18 October 1983. When they were arrested, they had been trying to kidnap alleged ETA member José María Larretxea in an attempt to obtain information on the whereabouts of Army Captain Alberto Martín Barrios, who had been kidnapped himself by ETA and later murdered. Finally, the then police inspector of Bilbao, Francisco Álvarez Sánchez, obtained the release of the four detainees with the agreement that they would appear before the French judicial authorities when summoned. However, this was not the case and thus they were sentenced in absentia.

The Antiterrorist Liberation Groups (GAL)—an organization that had remained unknown until then—claimed responsibility for the kidnapping of Segundo Marey in a communiqué written in French that was found in one of his pockets. The GAL accused the French government of allowing ETA members to stay in the French Basque Country and threatened to retaliate for each murder by the terrorists.

== Arrest of the mercenaries ==
Barely an hour after Marey's kidnapping, Pedro Sánchez, a former corporal of the French Foreign Legion, was arrested as a suspect. Mohand Talbi, accused like Sánchez of the kidnapping, was arrested and imprisoned in October 1984. Talbi was tried with Jean-Pierre Échalier in December 1987 and both were sentenced to thirteen years in prison. But Sánchez, the head of the command, was not tried as he had died of pancreatic cancer in a Bordeaux prison in December 1986 because, according to Talbi, he had been poisoned. In March 1989, the Court of Appeal of Paris reduced Talbi's sentence to nine years.

== Sentence against Amedo and investigation of the Marey case ==
In April 1987, mercenaries José Paulo Figueiredo Fontes, Rogerio Carvalho da Silva, Mario Correia da Cunha, and Antonio Jorge Ferreira Cisneros, who were on trial in Lisbon, claimed to have been hired by Spanish Deputy Commissioner José Amedo to attack ETA members in the south of France. In January 1988, the Criminal Court of the Audiencia Nacional (Note: English: National Court) of Spain found criminal evidence in Amedo's actions. His trips to Portugal in 1986, in which he hired those mercenaries, were of an official nature and paid with fondos reservados from the Ministry of the Interior, according to the investigations carried out by Judge Baltasar Garzón. On 20 September 1991, police officers José Amedo and Michel Domínguez were sentenced to 108 years in prison for six counts of attempted murder, in which they participated as perpetrators by incitement. In October 1994, Judge Garzón reopened the investigation into the kidnapping of Segundo Marey after Amedo and Domínguez implicated several police commanders and high-ranking officials of the Ministry of the Interior in the actions of the GAL for which they had been convicted.

== Sentence against high-ranking officials of the Ministry of the Interior ==
On 29 July 1998, the Supreme Court of Spain sentenced former Minister of the Interior José Barrionuevo, former Director General of State Security Rafael Vera, and former Civil Governor of Biscay Julián Sancristóbal to ten years in prison; former police commissioners Francisco Álvarez Sánchez, Miguel Planchuelo, and José Amedo to nine years and six months; former secretary general of the Spanish Socialist Workers' Party (PSOE) in Biscay Ricardo García Damborenea, to seven years; former police officers Julio Hierro and Francisco Saiz Ojeda, to five years and six months; former agents José Ramón Corujo and Luis Hens, to five years; and former police officer Michel Domínguez, to two years and four months. Likewise, they were ordered to pay Marey 30 million pesetas in damages.

They were sentenced for organizing and financing the kidnapping of Segundo Marey, with the aggravating circumstance that, when they learned that he was not a member of ETA, they prolonged his imprisonment by threatening to kill him if the French authorities did not release the four Spanish police officers who had been arrested while trying to kidnap a presumed member of ETA. The sentence also confirmed that both Barrionuevo and Vera encouraged and financed the actions of the GAL, due to being its highest-ranking officials. Their imprisonment did not take place until September and, just three months later, Barrionuevo and Vera were released thanks to a partial pardon by the administration of José María Aznar.

On 17 March 2001, the Constitutional Court upheld the Supreme Court's ruling and dismissed the appeals that had been filed. Likewise, the European Court of Human Rights ruled in January 2010 that the conviction had been fair. The ruling admitted that the investigation of the case by Judge Baltasar Garzón was not carried out in an impartial manner, but stated that this problem was subsequently corrected by the Supreme Court because it carried out a new preliminary investigation by Judge Eduardo Móner.

== See also ==
- GAL (paramilitary group)
- ETA (separatist group)
- Basque conflict
- Corruption in Spain
- Governments of José María Aznar
