= Zana Muhsen =

British author

- Born: 1965 (age 60–61); Birmingham, England
- Occupation: Author
- Writing career
- Subject: Non-fiction
- Notable works: Sold: Story of Modern-day Slavery, A Promise to Nadia

Zana Muhsen (born in 1965 in Birmingham, England), is a British author known for her book Sold: Story of Modern-day Slavery and its follow-up A Promise to Nadia. The books narrate the experiences that she and her sister Nadia Muhsen (born 1966) went through after they were sold into marriage by their father, Muthanna Muhsen, a Yemeni émigré.

== Overview ==
In the books and in interviews, Muhsen states that she and her sister had been sent to Yemen under the assumption that they were going on holiday to meet the paternal side of their family. Muhsen asserts that neither she nor her sister were aware of their father's plans, although her sister Nadia says that her father showed her a photograph of her future husband, Mohammed, in the UK, and that she knew she was going to be married.

On their arrival in Maqbanah, Zana, 15 and Nadia, 13 learned from Abdul Khada that she was the spouse of a teenage son of the father's friend. Zana lived in a town called Hockail and Nadia lived in Ashube. Their mother, Miriam Ali, an English woman, appealed unsuccessfully to the Foreign Office for assistance, but was told that the Yemeni government had stated that as they were now married to Yemeni men, they could only leave the country with their husbands' permission.

In 1987, an Observer journalist, Eileen McDonald, visited the girls and wrote a series of articles portraying the Muhsens as cruelly-treated slaves. The girls begged McDonald, and her male photographer, to help them leave the country, and the media coverage provoked an outcry in the UK. This led to the Yemeni government giving the Muhsens permission to leave the country in 1988, but forbade them from taking their children (Zana had one child, Marcus, Cyan and Leam, and Nadia three, Haney and Tina are two of them).

Zana Muhsen remained in England and in 1992, wrote Sold: Story of Modern-day Slavery with the ghostwriter Andrew Crofts, describing her experiences. It became an international bestseller and was dramatised by BBC Radio 4. The picture of a veiled woman on the cover of Sold is Nadia Muhsen. In 2001, Zana Muhsen and Crofts wrote a follow-up, A Promise to Nadia - the true story of a British slave. Nadia Muhsen gave an interview to Melanie Finn, a journalist for The Guardian, in 2002 in which she stated that she was happy with her life, saying, "It was never in my mind that I wanted to leave. It's just my sister, she wasn't comfortable."

According to Zana's Instagram in 2015, Nadia and her children (including Marcus) had made it to England.

== Bibliography ==
- Sold: Story of Modern-day Slavery (1994)
- A Promise to Nadia' (2000)

== See also ==
- Slavery in Yemen
