= Barbara Samson =

French poet (born 1975)

Barbara Samson (born February 7, 1975) is a French poet who was infected with HIV at the age of seventeen. Her story was made into the French television film Being Seventeen.

Samson sought treatment for an eating disorder at the age of seventeen. While staying in a French health clinic, she fell in love with another patient who wrote love poems for her. She later discovered that the poems were translations of Jim Morrison's lyrics of The Doors' rock songs. Her lover had also concealed his HIV-positive status, which Samson in turn contracted. She told nobody about her illness, because she was so ashamed. Barbara met Eric and in 1994 they opened together the "sidaction", a programme which was on almost every French television channel. She also toured numerous schools to speak about AIDS.

Samson wrote an autobiography, On n'est pas sérieux quand on a dix-sept ans ("Nobody Is Serious When They're Seventeen"). The book became a bestseller in France and was translated into eight languages.

As of 2005, Barbara Samson lives and works in France. She visited Ohio University in the spring of 2003 to speak about living with HIV.

== Bibliography ==
- Samson, Barbara; Marie-Thérèse Cuny (1994). On n'est pas sérieux quand on a dix-sept ans (in French). Paris: Fixot. ISBN 2-87645-246-4.
