= Enrique Rodríguez Galindo =

Spanish military personnel (1939–2021)

- Born: Enrique Rodríguez Galindo; 5 February 1939; Granada, Spain
- Died: 13 February 2021 (aged 82); Zaragoza, Spain
- Military career
- Allegiance: Kingdom of Spain
- Branch: Spanish Civil Guard
- Service years: 1958–2002
- Rank: Lieutenant (1965–1971); Captain (1971–1980); Commanding officer (1980–1988); Lieutenant colonel (1988–1992); Colonel (1992–1995); Brigadier general (1995–2002)
- Awards: Cross of Naval Merit; Order of Civil Merit; Royal and Military Order of Saint Hermenegild; Cross of Military Merit

Enrique Rodríguez Galindo (5 February 1939 – 13 February 2021) was a Spanish brigadier general of the Civil Guard, who was sentenced to 71 years in prison in 2000 for the kidnapping and murder of the alleged Euskadi Ta Askatasuna (ETA) members José Antonio Lasa and José Ignacio Zabala in the so-called Antiterrorist Liberation Groups case. Galindo served five years before being released in 2004 under health grounds. Galindo died in 2021 at 81 after contracting COVID-19.

== Early life and professional career ==
Enrique Rodriguez Galindo was born on 5 February 1939 in Granada, Andalusia, Spain, to a non-commissioned officer in the Civil Guard. In 1958, he entered the Military Academy of the Civil Guard of Úbeda, Province of Jaén. After graduating second in his cohort, he joined the General Military Academy in Zaragoza, where he graduated as a lieutenant in 1965.

Upon graduation, Galindo went through various assignments at various localities, first at Cantavieja, then at the former Spanish colony of Equatorial Guinea. Subsequently, he was assigned to the now defunct Traffic Subsector of Guipúzcoa, in San Sebastián.

On 25 May 1980, after having obtained the job of commander, he was required to find out if he was a volunteer to fill a vacancy in the San Sebastián Command – Intxaurrondo Barracks, then in full growth and expansion.

After the departure of the various chiefs and second chiefs of the command, he was assuming the competences and sometimes carrying out the accidental or interim leadership of the Intxaurrondo Command, enhancing the work of the Information Service, beginning to achieve results – detention of different commands legal and released, both from the Autonomous Anticapitalist Commandos, as well as from ETA political-military and ETA. During that time, he participated in the arrest of Jesús María Zabarte, and José Antonio López Ruiz alias Kubati, both operations, thanks to the information obtained through the surveillance of the targets.

From this time until his promotion to general in 1995, highlights the arrest on 29 March 1992 of the leadership of ETA in the French town of Bidart, in the Atlantic Pyrenees, known colloquially as «Collective Artapalo ».

The government promoted Galindo to brigadier general on 4 August 1995.

He was also the architect and the person who mediated negotiations for different peace talks that the different socialist governments of the 1980s held with the ETA leadership. First through mediators in the Basque Country and later in direct conversations with Domingo Iturbe Abasolo, alias Txomin, in the mid-1980s, in Andorra.

In 2006 he published an autobiography entitled My life against ETA.

== Legal prosecution ==
=== Member of the paramilitary organization Grupos Antiterroristas de Liberación ===
On 20 March 1995, the remains of two people were discovered in the municipality of Busot, province of Alicante. Chief Inspector Jesús García García identified them as José Ignacio Zabala and José Antonio Lasa, ETA members who had disappeared in Bayonne, France. Being covered with quicklime, he sensed that they could be victims of the Grupos Antiterroristas de Liberación (GAL). The judicial procedure was opened by the National Audience. After the statements of several witnesses, Rodríguez Galindo was charged by the Audience of belonging to an armed gang on 19 March 1998, for ordering the kidnapping and death of the ETA members. He was in preventive detention between 22 May and 2 August 1996, due to well-founded suspicions of his possible criminal responsibility, and again between September 1997 and June 1998. He testified in court as a defendant on the 16th of December 1999.

On 26 April 2000, he was sentenced to 71 years in prison for the 1983 kidnapping and murder of José Antonio Lasa and José Ignacio Zabala. The former civil governor of Guipúzcoa Julen Elgorriaga, Lieutenant Colonel Ángel Vaquero – at that time captain and head of the Information Service in the Intxaurrondo Command – and former civil guards Enrique Dorado and Felipe Bayo were also convicted of the same crimes. On 17 October of that year, Lasa and Zabala were kidnapped in Bayonne, France, by members of the GAL. They were held at the Intxaurrondo Civil Guard barracks. Following General Galindo's instructions, they were taken to the La Cumbre palace in San Sebastián, where they were tortured. In view of the state in which they remained, General Galindo, with the knowledge of the civil governor Julen Elgorriaga and Lieutenant Colonel Ángel Vaquero, ordered their disappearance. The civil guards Enrique Dorado and Felipe Bayo took them to Busot, Alicante, dug a grave, and the first fired three shots in the head. Then they were buried. Their remains were found in January 1985, but they remained unidentified until 1995, as their bodies had been buried in quicklime, which made their identification difficult.

Rodríguez Galindo was jailed on 9 May 2000 in the military prison of Alcalá de Henares. Due to his loss of military status, on 14 July 2003, he was admitted to the Ocaña II prison. During his time in prison, his family submitted a petition for clemency accompanied by 100,000 signatures. The Supreme Court Prosecutor's Office opposed this pardon and the Court ruled against.

In July 2001 the Supreme Court increased these sentences, considering their condition as public officials as aggravating, and in July 2002 the Constitutional Court refused to grant an appeal for protection ("recurso de amparo") to those convicted.

On 2 April 2002, the Ministry of Defense decreed Rodríguez Galindo's discharge from the Civil Guard after his conviction.

His appeal to the European Court of Human Rights in Strasbourg was dismissed in 2010; the Court declared that the European Convention on Human Rights had not been violated during the trial.

He was granted a semi-release prison regime in 2005 and definitive parole in 2013.

After serving five years of his sentence, in 2004, the General Directorate of Penitentiary Institutions ordered Galindo's release from prison for serious health reasons, remaining on probation until his death in 2021.

=== Drug trafficking and trafficking in women ===
During his career, he was accused by different media — Diario 16, Egin and Egunkaria — of being linked to drug trafficking networks and trafficking in women.

He was denounced but the case was closed by the San Sebastián Investigating Court, which considered that the accusations were "simple rumors that have not been proven". Galindo denounced the Diario 16 and Egin newspapers for publishing these news, but lost the respective trials in 1999 and 2000, both by the Supreme Court. He also denounced the Basque group Negu Gorriak for the lyrics of the song Ustelkeria ("Rottenness"), in which the group echoed the news published in Egunkaria, although the Civil Guard ended up losing the lawsuit on 9 June 2000.

=== Tortures ===
The filmmaker Ion Arretxe accused him in El País of having twisted his testicles when he was detained in 1985 with Mikel Zabalza at the Intxaurrondo barracks: '"They took me to a river, they put two plastic bags on me that they closed with electrical tape and for hours they submerged me in the water. They transferred me unconscious to the Intxaurrondo barracks and for three days they tortured me in various ways. I was naked, with a hood covering my head, in an empty apartment where they wouldn't let me sleep and they kept beating me. Galindo even appeared, who took off my hood, asked me if I knew him, to say what he knew and he twisted my testicles".

== Death ==
On 2 February 2021 it was reported that Rodríguez Galindo was in ICU with a serious condition affected by COVID-19 and his wife was also infected. He died on 13 February 2021, in Zaragoza eight days after his 82nd birthday amid the COVID-19 pandemic in Spain.
