= Andrew Crofts (author) =

British writer

- Born: 1953 (age 72–73)
- Occupation: Author

Andrew Crofts (born 1953) is a British ghostwriter. In 2014, he published a memoir, Confessions of a Ghostwriter (The Friday Project). Although the book contains anecdotes about the ghostwriting profession, The Daily Telegraph noted that "when it comes to famous clients, he is as silent as Jeeves".

== Early life and career ==
Crofts was born in 1953 in England and educated at Lancing College.

He moved to London at the age of 17 and took a variety of jobs to support himself while establishing a career as a freelance writer; this included a stint running a modelling agency in Bond Street. During this time, he submitted work to various magazines and publishers. For a number of years, he worked as a freelance business journalist and later as a travel writer, spending time in the Far East, the Caribbean, and the South Pacific.

In 2006, his name was linked to a book by Big Brother winner Pete Bennett, who wrote about his childhood and Tourette syndrome in Pete: My Story (HarperCollins).

In 2007, the thriller writer Robert Harris quoted Crofts's ghostwriting book at the start of every chapter of his bestselling novel The Ghost. The book was subsequently adapted into a film by Roman Polanski, with Ewan McGregor playing the ghostwriter. Crofts commented that The Ghost was "a gift from the gods. Harris did us all a huge favour."

Crofts's ghostwriting career has involved writing for dictators, politicians, arms dealers, and billionaires, as well as visits to palaces and tax havens in Monaco and Bermuda. His experiences led to Secrets of the Italian Gardener, a novel set inside a dictator's palace during the Arab Spring, narrated by the dictator's ghostwriter. The same character features in a second novel by Crofts, What Lies Around Us. In this sequel, the narrator becomes embroiled in the American celebrity political scene when paid a million dollars by a Silicon Valley billionaire to ghostwrite the autobiography of a Hollywood superstar.

Crofts's fees are substantial, reputed to average six figures. He has said that because a ghostwriter has no need to invent plots or do lengthy research, "it is perfectly feasible to produce four books a year."

== Known ghosted titles ==
- Sold, by Zana Muhsen (Time Warner): About two sisters sold as child brides in Yemen. It was France's best-selling non-fiction book of the year at the time of publication, with close to four million copies sold worldwide.
- The Little Prisoner, by Jane Elliott (HarperCollins): A tale of child abuse which reached number one in The Sunday Times charts as both a hardback and a paperback, selling half a million copies within a few months.
- Betrayed, by Lyndsey Harris (Arrow): The story of a young girl framed for crimes she did not commit by the person she trusted the most. It won the Richard and Judy "True" competition.
- The Kid, by Kevin Lewis (Penguin): Topped The Sunday Times charts.
- Just a Boy, by Richard McCann (Ebury): Topped The Sunday Times charts.
- For a House Made of Stone, for Gina French (Vision): About a girl who started life in the Philippine mountains and ended up on trial for murder in England, via bars in Manila and expat life in Brunei.
- Heroine of the Desert, by Donya Al-Nahi (Metro): About a woman who fought to reunite mothers with their children in international custody battles.
- Through Gypsy Eyes, for Kathy Etchingham (Gollancz): Etchingham was Jimi Hendrix's girlfriend.
- Kathy and Me, for the actress and soap star Gillian Taylforth.
- Pete: My Story, for Pete Bennett, a Tourette's sufferer.
- Please, Daddy, No, for Stuart Howarth (HarperCollins).
- My Family is All I Have, for Helen-Alice Dear (Ebury Press): About an English woman trapped behind the Iron Curtain for 50 years.
- A Promise to Nadia, by Zana Muhsen: The follow-up to Sold, detailing Zana's struggle to free her sister.
- Daddy's Little Earner, by Maria Landon (HarperCollins): About a girl growing up with a violent father who sexually abused her and forced her into prostitution, and her eventual escape.

== Authored books ==
- Confessions of a Ghostwriter (The Friday Project): An anecdotal memoir of ghostwriting and the publishing industry.
- Secrets of the Italian Gardener: A novel about a ghostwriter, set inside the palace of a dictator about to be overthrown in the Arab Spring.
- The Little Hero (Vision): Tells the story of Iqbal Masih, a child slave who escaped and became a campaigner for the abolition of bonded labour in Pakistan before being assassinated at the age of 13.
- Maisie's Amazing Maids (Stratus): A light-hearted novel about a ghostwriter.
- The Freelance Writer's Handbook (Piatkus Books).
- Ghostwriting (A&C Black).
- The Change Agent: How to Create a Wonderful World (Tonto Books): The story of James Martin, a noted futurist and benefactor of the Oxford James Martin School, and Crofts's visit to Martin's private island in Bermuda.
- The Overnight Fame of Steffi McBride (Blake).
- The Fabulous Dreams of Maggie de Beer (Smashwords and Kindle).

== Controversy ==
Pete Bennett caused controversy at the time of his book's publication by admitting to a journalist for The Guardian that he had not read the book he was supposed to have written.

Speculation has circulated regarding other titles and the extent of Crofts's input in their creation. This was particularly noted after Robert Harris's book The Ghost was widely presumed to be based on Tony Blair; Blair has always stated that he did not use a ghostwriter for his own autobiography.

Through his blog, Crofts has been a vocal champion of electronic publishing for authors and self-publishing for those who need their books published privately. He was one of the first ghostwriters to launch his own website. In 2012, he joined the Management Committee of the Society of Authors.
