= GAL (paramilitary group) =

1983–87 Spanish government death squads

GAL (Grupos Antiterroristas de Liberación)
- Leaders: José Barrionuevo; Enrique Rodríguez Galindo; Rafael Vera; José Amedo Fouce; Ricardo García Damborenea; Julián Sancristóbal
- Dates active: October 15, 1983 – 1987
- Active regions: France; Spain
- Status: Inactive
- Size: Several dozen members

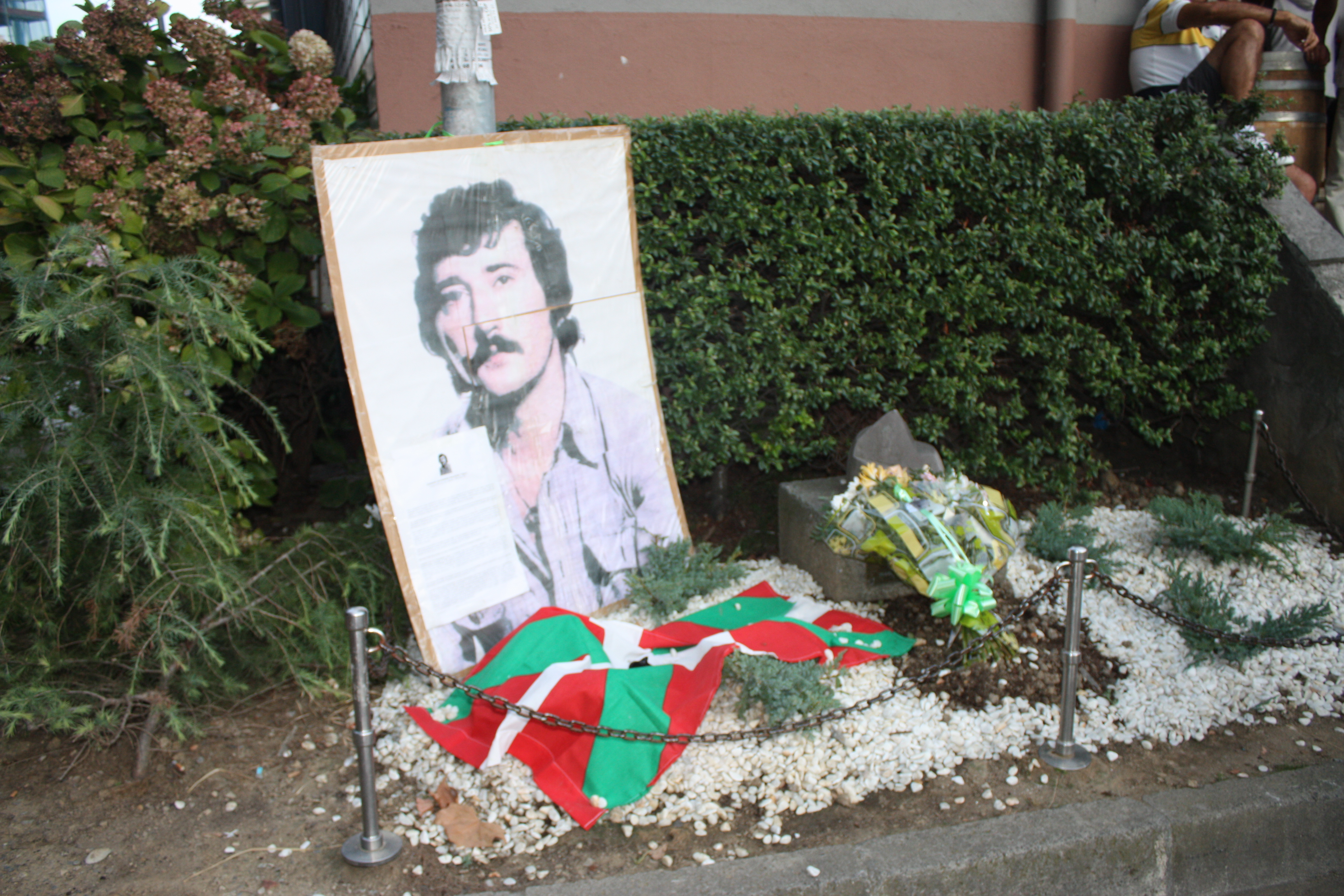
Memorial for Eugenio Gutiérrez Salazar, killed by GAL

GAL (Spanish: Grupos Antiterroristas de Liberación, "Antiterrorist Liberation Groups") were death squads illegally established by officials of the Spanish government during the Basque conflict to fight against ETA, the main Basque separatist militant group. They were active from 1983 to 1987 under Spanish Socialist Workers' Party (PSOE)-led governments.

GAL's activities, known as "the dirty war", primarily targeted ETA members and Basque nationalists, with attacks occurring mainly in the Basque country on the French side of the Spanish-French border, but kidnappings and torture also took place in Spain. The daily newspaper El Mundo played a crucial role in exposing GAL. Several Spanish police officers and government officials were convicted and imprisoned when the operation ended. The death squads were an important issue during the 1996 election, when the PSOE was defeated by José María Aznar's People's Party (PP) for the first time.

== Background ==
GAL operated primarily in the Basque Country on the French side of the Spanish-French border, but kidnappings and torture also took place in Spain. Most victims (at least 27 dead and 26 injured) were ETA members or activist Basque nationalists, but some were not known to have links to ETA or any other organization advocating political violence. GAL was active from 1983 to 1987, a period known as la guerra sucia ("the dirty war") in Spanish history.

Its main purposes were to attack ETA members and Basque nationalist targets and to wreak havoc in French territory to put pressure on the French government.

Apart from the nationalist rationale for its opposition to Basque separatism, GAL was not on the left–right political spectrum; many members were foreign mercenaries. Many of these mercenaries were recruited from the European far right (including the OAS), however, and many perpetrators and organizers were active or former Francoist civil servants.

From its beginning, GAL attacks indicated a close connection to high-ranking officials in the PSOE government and a number of police officials in the Basque Country. In addition to GAL operatives, several Spanish police officers and government officials were convicted and imprisoned when the operation ended. Interior Minister José Barrionuevo and his associate, Rafael Vera, were convicted of the kidnapping of Segundo Marey. Gipuzkoa governor Julen Elgorriaga and Civil Guard general Enrique Rodríguez Galindo were found guilty of the murder of Joxe Antonio Lasa and Joxe Ignacio Zabala in October 1983.

After the assassination of PSOE Senator Enrique Casas by the CAA, PSOE officials attempted to assassinate Herri Batasuna representative Santi Brouard. Would-be assassin Jose Luis Morcillo received 7.5 million pesetas from high-ranking Civil Guard official Rafael Masa, as ordered by Spanish State Security chief director Julian Sancristobal. Part of the payment for the attempt on Brouard's life, however, was diverted to unknown purposes.

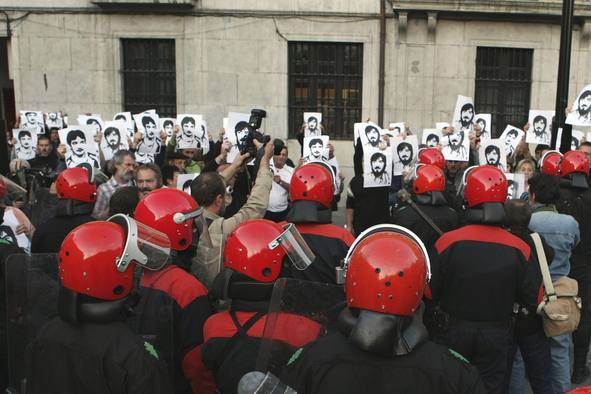
Memorial demonstration for Joxe Antonio Lasa and Joxe Ignacio Zabala in 2008

Prosecutors proved that the police officers who recruited mercenaries and the government officials who organized the dirty-war operations also embezzled large amounts of public money. Rafael Vera and others were sentenced for illegal appropriation of funds from the Interior Ministry. To ensure their silence, the PSOE government bribed inspector José Amedo Fouce and Michel Domínguez. Vera was sentenced to 18 months in prison, and his secretary received a nine-month sentence.

Investigative journalists from the newspaper El Mundo reported that Prime Minister and PSOE leader Felipe González was suspected of GAL involvement. Several years of investigation concluded that "Señor X" was the chief official of an organization supervising Interior Minister José Barrionuevo and Vera, but González was not named or tried. The CIA eventually identified Señor X as the prime minister. González' involvement was confirmed by former National Police Corps officer José Manuel Villarejo, who told the Congress of Deputies on October 21, 2021 that González had created GAL.

The death squads were an important issue during the 1996 election, when the PSOE was defeated by José María Aznar's People's Party (PP) for the first time. González then resigned as PSOE leader. With the exception of Ricardo García Damborenea, PSOE leaders have never acknowledged responsibility for the GAL or condemned their crimes. González, who has never been charged with a GAL-related offence, has called publicly for pardons for his former subordinates. PSOE leaders campaigned for leniency towards their former colleagues, and the Aznar government pardoned several of them.

== Timeline ==
- 1983
  - October 17: Kidnapping and assassination of alleged ETA members Joxe Lasa Arostegi and José Ignacio Zabala. Their mutilated bodies were found in Alicante in 1985, but not formally identified until 1995. Several Civil Guard officers were convicted.
  - October 18: Attempted kidnapping in Bayonne of alleged ETA leader José Mari Larretxea Goñi by four Spanish policemen. The four officers were arrested by French gendarmes.
  - December 4: Kidnapping of Segundo Marey by mercenaries hired by the Spanish police, who demanded the liberation of the four police officers arrested for the attempted kidnapping of Larraetxea. The officers were released on December 8, and Marey on December 13. Marey, not related to ETA, was apparently kidnapped by mistake.
  - December 19: Assassination of alleged ETA member Ramón Oñaederra in Bayonne
  - December 29: Assassination of alleged ETA leader Mikel Goikoetxea in Saint-Jean-de-Luz by a mercenary sniper
- 1984
  - February 8: Assassination of alleged ETA members Vicente Perurena and Angel Gurmindo in Hendaye
  - February 25: Sniper assassination of alleged ETA member Eugenio Gutiérrez Salazar in Mendi
  - March 1: Assassination of railroad worker Jean Pierre Leyba in Hendaye
  - March 19: GAL mercenary Jean-Pierre Cherid dies in Biarritz when the bomb he is planting explodes prematurely.
  - March 23: Assassination of alleged ETA leader Javier Pérez Arenaza in Biarritz
  - May 3: Assassination of alleged ETA member Rafael Goikoetxea in Baigorri. His companion, Jesús Zugarramurdi, is injured. ETA kills industrialist Ángel Rodríguez, whom they accused of assisting the GAL, that day.
  - May 26: Kidnapping and torture of Rafael and Endika Lorenzo, members of the anti-nuclear committees in Algorta (Getxo, Biscay)
  - June 15: Assassination of alleged ETA member Tomás Pérez Revilla by a bomb hidden in a motorcycle in Biarritz. His companion, Ramón Orbe, is injured.
  - July 10: Bomb attack on the Consolation tavern, injuring three
  - November 18: Assassination of dancer Christian Olaskoaga in Biriatou. Olaskoaga was not known to have ETA connections.
  - November 20: Assassination of Santiago Brouard, leader of HASI, in his physician's office in Bilbao
  - December 11: Attack injuring José Iradier in Hendaye
- 1985
  - February 1: Attack injuring Herri Taldeak leader Xabier Manterola
  - February 5: Bomb attack injuring Christian Casteigts in Bayonne. Casteigts was not known to have ETA connections.
  - March 4: An attack on the Lagunequin bar in Bayonne injures two.
  - March 26: Assassination attempt on alleged ETA member Ramón Basañez Jauregi in Bayonne, seriously injuring him
  - March 29: Attack on Les Pyreneés tavern in Bayonne. Five people (one of whom was allegedly an ETA member) were injured, one fatally.
  - March 30: Assassination of photojournalist Xabier Galdeano in Saint-Jean-de-Luz
  - June 14: Attack on the Trinkete tavern in Ciboure. Two people were killed, neither known to have ETA connections.
  - June 26: Assassination of alleged ETA member Santos Blanco González in Bayonne.
  - July 8: Juan Carlos Lacertúa is injured in an attack on the Vittor Bar in Ciboure.
  - July 16: A bomb is discovered attached to the car of Fernando Eguilior in Anglet.
  - August 2: ETA member Juan María Otaegui Elizegui ("Txato") is killed in Saint-Jean-Pied-de-Port.
  - August 31: Assassination of Dominique Labeyrie in St. Jean de Luz. Labeyrie had no known ETA connections.
  - September 25: Monbar Hotel attack in Bayonne kills ETA members José Mari Etxaniz, Iñaki Asteazu Izarra, Agustín Irazustabarrena and Sabin Etxaide Ibarguren.
  - December 24: Robert Caplanne is fatally injured in Biarritz. Caplanne had no known ETA connections.
- 1986
  - February 8: Attack on the Batxoki tavern injures three.
  - February 17: Assassination of Christophe Matxikote and Catherine Brion, who had no ETA connections. GAL did not claim responsibility but Miguel Brecia (with known links to the groups) was convicted of the attack, and the court considered it a GAL attack.
- 1987
  - July 24: Assassination of Juan Carlos García Goena, unconnected with ETA. Although GAL did not claim responsibility, the mercenaries who killed him accused GAL of ordering it.

== Convicted members ==
- José Barrionuevo, interior minister in PSOE cabinets from 1982 to 1988
- Rafael Vera, director of state security
- Ricardo García Damborenea, secretary general of PSE-PSOE in Biscay
- Francisco Álvarez, antiterrorist czar
- Miguel Planchuelo, chief of Bilbao's Police Information Brigade
- José Amedo Fouce, police chief
- Julián Sancristóbal, gobernador civil (delegate of the Spanish government) in Biscay
- Enrique Rodríguez Galindo, chief of the Civil Guard headquarters in Intxaurrondo

== Similar groups ==
- Guerrilleros de Cristo Rey
- Anti-Terrorismo ETA (ATE)
- Batallón Vasco Español (BVE)
- Grupos Armados Españoles (GAE)

Members of Batasuna gave the name "Green GAL" to a Civil Guard group (who wear green uniforms) based in San Sebastián's Intxaurrondo barracks, alleging that the group attacked ETA members illegally.

== See also ==
- Henri Curiel, reported by Lucien Aimé-Blanc to have been killed by Jean-Pierre Maïone-Libaude on behalf of the GAL in 1979
- Pierre Goldman, killed by Maïone-Libaude
- Stefano Delle Chiaie, Italian neofascist
- Jean Pierre Cherid, former member of Organisation armée secrète, Batallón Vasco Español and the GAL

== Books ==
- Dirty War, Clean Hands -- ETA, the GAL and Spanish Democracy by Paddy Woodworth - ISBN 0-300-09750-6
- Garzón -- La Hora de la Verdad by Loretta Napoleoni ISBN 978-84-938316-9-1
