= Jean-Pierre Maïone-Libaude =

Jean-Pierre Maïone-Libaude (9 July 1942 – 13 June 1982) was a French veteran of the Algerian War (1954–62), former member of the OAS' Commando Delta, a nationalist terrorist group. He then became the informant of police officer Lucien Aimé-Blanc, former vice chief of staff of the Antigang brigade and of the Narcotics brigade. Jean-Pierre Maïon (as he was usually known) was assassinated on 13 June 1982 at Argent-sur-Sauldre, in the Cher province, soon after being freed from prison. In 2006, Lucien Aimé-Blanc revealed that Maïon had acknowledged having assassinated Pierre Goldman in 1979 on behalf of the GAL Spanish death squad. Aimé-Blanc also stated that Maïon may have been responsible for the assassination of Henri Curiel in 1978.

== Sources ==
- Lucien Aimé-Blanc and Jean-Michel Caradec'h, L'Indic et le Commissaire, Plon, 2006, 246 pages
- Pierre Goldman, Le frère de l'ombre, Seuil, 2005, 298 p.

== See also ==
- List of assassinated people
- Organisation armée secrète
- Algerian War of Independence (1954–62)
- Grupos Antiterroristas de Liberación death squad
