= Killing of Lasa and Zabala =

1983 murders by GAL in Spain

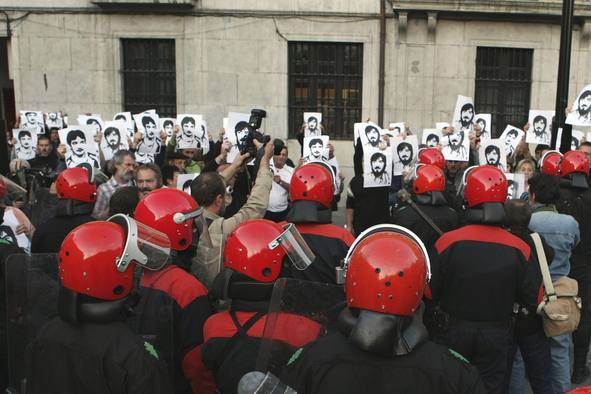
Demonstration in remembrance of Jose Antonio Lasa and Jose Ignacio Zabala in 2008

The murder of Lasa and Zabala was one of the first acts carried out by the GAL, a Spanish state sponsored death squad, Basques José Antonio Lasa and José Ignacio Zabala were kidnapped, tortured and executed in 1983.

This action was organized by a paramilitary group called GAL which subsequent trials found to have been established by figures within the PSOE government. Alleged ETA militants Joxean Lasa and Joxi Zabala, while getting into a friend's car, were kidnapped by non-uniformed members of the Spanish police in Bayonne (Labourd-French Basque Country).

They were secretly taken to San Sebastián, and locked up in a house, La Cumbre, property of the government always in Spanish Police's (Guardia Civil) hands. For a long time, these two men from the municipality of Tolosa, were interrogated and tortured by several operatives. Eventually they were ordered to murder Lasa and Zabala.

In order to commit the crime, the hostages were transferred to Alicante. There, they were forced to dig their own graves, and then, they were shot dead. Finally, the executors covered the dead bodies with quicklime to accelerate their decomposition, and eliminate or minimize any evidence of the crime.

== Trial and sentencing ==
Enrique Rodríguez Galindo, General of the Guardia Civil (Spanish Police) stationed in Inchaurrondo, Angel Vaquero, lieutenant colonel in the same barracks, and Julen Elgorriaga the then civil governor of Gipuzkoa were found guilty. In total they were sentenced to 365 years in prison, but were released from prison after a short period in prison, i.e. 4 years and a half in the case of General Galindo, eventually granted a pardon by the government.

== In popular culture ==
Pablo Malo directed the 2014 film Lasa eta Zabala about this case.
