= Rodolfo Martín Villa =

Spanish engineer and politician (born 1934)

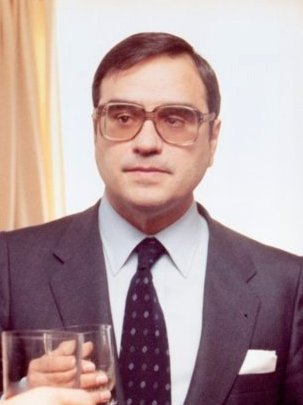
- Martín Villa in 1980

First Deputy Prime Minister of Spain
- In office 1 December 1981 – 28 July 1982
- Prime Minister: Leopoldo Calvo-Sotelo
- Preceded by: Manuel Gutiérrez Mellado
- Succeeded by: Alfonso Guerra

Minister of Interior
- In office 5 July 1976 – 6 April 1979
- Prime Minister: Adolfo Suárez
- Preceded by: Manuel Fraga Iribarne
- Succeeded by: Antonio Ibáñez Freire

Minister for Trade Union Relations
- In office 12 December 1975 – 5 July 1976
- Prime Minister: Carlos Arias Navarro

Personal details
- Born: 3 October 1934 (age 92) Santa María del Páramo, Second Spanish Republic
- Party: Union of the Democratic Centre (until 1983); People's Party
- Education: Technical University of Madrid

Rodolfo Martín Villa (born 3 October 1934) is a Spanish engineer and politician, who served in various capacities in the cabinets of the Spanish transition to democracy, including interior minister and first deputy prime minister. He was under investigation in Argentina for aggravated homicide and crimes against humanity committed during the 1976 Vitoria massacre, and was indicted in 2021, but not found guilty in September 2022.

== Early life and education ==
Martín Villa was born in Santa María del Páramo, León, on 3 October 1934. He holds a university degree in engineering which he obtained from Technical University of Madrid.

== Career ==
Martín Villa is an industrial engineer and tax inspector by profession. In February 1962 he became the head of the Sindicato Español Universitario, the university syndicate of FET y de las JONS. He replaced Jesús Aparicio-Bernal in the post. Martín Villa's tenure ended in December 1964, and Daniel Regalado assumed the post.

Martín Villa was a member of the Union of the Democratic Centre. He was the civil governor of Barcelona until his appointment as minister for trade union relations in 1975. His tenure lasted until 1976.

He was appointed interior minister in the first cabinet of Adolfo Suárez on 5 July 1976, succeeding Manuel Fraga in the post. Martín Villa won a seat in the 1977 general election, the first democratic elections in Spain since 1936, for the UCD, representing León. Following the election he retained his post as interior minister, being responsible for internal security, local administration, and civil rights. He also tried to carry out some reforms in these areas, but was unable to reform the Spanish police due to the intervention of the Spanish Army. On 6 April 1979, Martín Villa's term as interior minister ended, and he was succeeded by Antonio Ibáñez Freire.

In a reshuffle of September 1980, he was appointed minister of the regions in the Suárez cabinet. He then served as first deputy prime minister from 1 December 1981 to 28 July 1982. After holding his seat for the UCD in the 1979 and 1982 general elections, he resigned in February 1983, but returned to the Congress at the 1989 election as a member of the People's Party, representing Madrid, holding his seat in the two subsequent elections before resigning in February 1997.

In addition, he was a board member of the institution Caja de Madrid, a savings and loans institution. On 10 February 1997, he was named as the chairman of the Sociedad Estatal de Participaciones Industriales. From February 1997 to May 2002, he was the chairman of Endesa, a government-controlled electricity group. He became honorary chairman of the company in May 2002.

In 2006, he was appointed chairman of the Sogecable, a Spanish pay-TV provider. His term ended in October 2010, and Manuel Polanco replaced him in the post. Martín Villa was a member of the advisory committee of former Madrid-based think tank FRIDE.

=== Trial ===
Argentine human rights lawyers announced in Madrid on 23 April 2013 that three former Spanish ministers of the Franco regime, including Martín Villa, should be arrested and tried due to their alleged participation in the killing of Argentine citizens. Martín Villa was specifically accused of ordering the execution of five workers during a labour strike in Vitoria in March 1976.

In September 2022, the Argentine court decided by a vote of 2 to 1 that the charge of crimes against humanity levelled at Martín Villa should be annulled.
