= History of Spain (1975–present) =

Spain after Franco's death

In the history of contemporary Spain, the death of caudillo Francisco Franco on 20 November 1975 marked the beginning of the transition to democracy, the establishment of the parliamentary monarchy and the subsequent accession of King Juan Carlos I to the throne. In 1978, the current Constitution of Spain was adopted and the status of Spain's autonomous entities (autonomías) was defined.

== Road to elections (1975–1977) ==
In the uncertainty after Franco's death, the political situation could have taken one of three turns:

- Continuity of the previous, authoritarian regime. This idea was backed by Franco's government officials, (the "bunker"), high-ranking military officers and numerous veterans of Movimiento Nacional.
- A complete overhaul of the previous system. Sectors of the opposition who supported this move assembled as the Junta Democrática. However, fearing a reaction from the military, other members of the opposition preferred concessions with the previous regime, thus creating the Plataforma de Convergencia Democrática.
- A gradual reform of the previous system and the introduction of a constitutional monarchy. This idea was championed by the King, who had a minority of followers.

In his coronation speech, the King had opened the possibility for reform along the lines of constitutional monarchy. However, for this to be possible, high-ranking officials from the previous regime had to be ejected from power.

The first act of the King was to name Torcuato Fernández-Miranda, his old teacher, as the President of the Cortes and of the Consejo del Reino. This gave the King control over the Cortes and provided him with critical assistance to dismantle the old regime within a legal framework. Torcuato Fernández Miranda was despised by the falangists and was a staunch supporter of reform.

The new government included many "reformists" like Manuel Fraga, who was the visible head of the government. Manuel Fraga often argued with the opposition (even imprisoning leaders of the Platajunta, a hybrid coalition of the Junta Democrática and the Plataforma de Convergencia Democrática), whom he wanted to get out of the way. Fraga preferred "slow evolution" into democracy, unlike the King. Carlos Arias Navarro consistently impeded the King's wishes of accelerating reform. As a result, the King had to get rid of him, as it seemed he had caved in under pressure from the bunker.

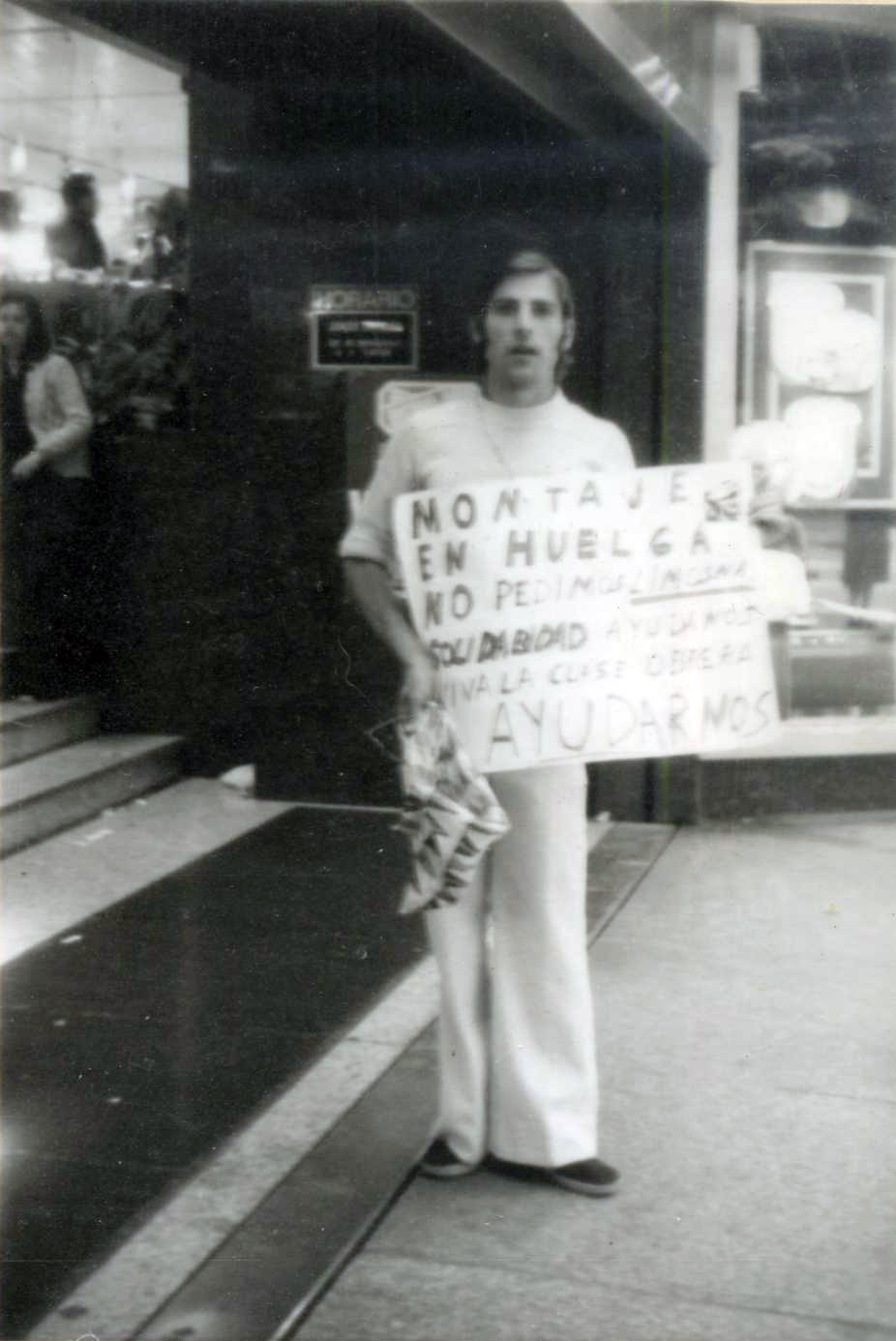
Affected by the delayed 1973–1975 recession, workers went on strike across Spain. This man begs contributions for the strikers of the assembly sector of Biscay in 1977.

Whereas the King could not dismiss Arias Navarro based on still relevant laws from Francoist Spain, in an interview with Newsweek on 26 April 1976, the King expressed his discontent with Arias. In June 1976, Arias signed his resignation. Adolfo Suárez took his place as the President of the Government on 3 July 1976. Suárez came from a Francoist background, so as a result he could not count on the support of the old regime búnker, the reformists or the opposition. After Fraga declined to participate in the new government, lesser known politicians formed the new Cabinet. Adolfo Suárez was a staunch supporter of the King's reform policies.

As these events unfolded, a lesser amnesty was conceded to political prisoners of the old regime. A wide amnesty was proclaimed on 17 March 1977. Next, Suárez took it upon himself to reform the Cortes and to establish the legal framework for the elections. Suárez's new government wrote the Political Reform Act in 1977. It called for the Cortes to be divided into two Chambers, consisting of a Congress with 350 members and a Senate with 201. After being pressured by the King and by Suárez, the Cortes signed their own demise and approved the reform, which was held to test with a popular referendum. An overwhelming majority approved the change (94% in favour).

This law required the government to convoke general elections, but it had to legalise political parties first. They were in fact legalised soon after, with the limitation that their manifestos had to abide by the law. On 23 March 1977, the laws regulating elections were published in the BOE, thus officially coming into effect.

Violence was not uncommon. The most striking event was the 1977 Atocha massacre, where five people working for Comisiones Obreras (a trade union affiliated to the Communist Party) were murdered by right-wing extremists. There was also violence from left-wing groups, like ETA (which continued to campaign violently for the independence of the Basque Country) or new groups like GRAPO, a Maoist group, or MPAIAC, a Canarian independence group.

The Spanish Communist Party was legalised on Holy Saturday (9 April) to prevent the military from reacting. This led to the resignation of the Minister of the Navy and an Army General. Santiago Carrillo, the Communist Party Secretary, had renounced republicanism and the Republican flag.

On 14 May, don Juan de Borbón renounced his rights to the throne in favour of Juan Carlos in La Zarzuela. Shortly after, Torcuato Fernández-Miranda resigned due to political differences with Adolfo Suárez. Fernández Miranda wanted to establish a system similar to that of the United States, with a centre-left and a centre-right party alternating in power.

The 1977 Spanish general election, which took place on 15 June 1977, produced the following results for Spanish Congress:

- Union of the Democratic Centre (UCD, Unión de Centro Democrático), a centre-right party led by Suárez obtained 166 seats
- Spanish Socialist Workers' Party (PSOE, Partido Socialista Obrero Español), a centre-left party, obtained 118 seats.
- Communist Party of Spain (PCE, Partido Comunista Español), a left-wing party, obtained 20 seats.
- People's Alliance (AP, Alianza Popular), right-wing party, formed by ex-Francoists and led by Manuel Fraga, obtained 16 seats.
- Pacte Democràtic per Catalunya (PDC, Pacte Democràtic per Catalunya), centre-right Catalan party, obtained 11 seats.
- Basque Nationalist Party (PNV, Partido Nacionalista Vasco), centre-right Basque party obtained 8 seats.
- Other parties, including left-wing Basque and Catalan separatists, Christian democrats and extreme left-wing parties obtained 11 seats.

== The Spanish Constitution (1978) ==
After the elections, it was necessary to write up a constitution for the new Spain. Since the 1931 constitution was republican and now Juan Carlos I was appointed king by Franco, a new one was necessary. The pre-constitutional project was written up by a commission consisting of deputies of all main political groups except PNV. After several months of discussion, a consensus was reached between several parties, and the Constitution was sent to the Cortes for approval. After this, it was put on a referendum on 6 December 1978 and was approved by 58% of the total census, with an 8% negative vote and 33% abstention. It was signed by the King on 27 December and took effect after its publication in the Spanish BOE (Official State Bulletin) on 29 December 1978.

The constitution granted the right for historical communities to form autonomous regions in Spain. The first regions to do this were the Basque Country and Catalonia, and soon after other regions joined, making up the modern map of Spain. This was widely criticised by the army and by right wing groups, which thought the unity of Spain was compromised, and it is still a source of argument today.

== The dissolution of UCD and the 23-F (1979–1982) ==
In November 1978, information services had been alerted to a possible coup d'état whose objective was to form a "National Salvation" government and arrest Suárez. This was called Operación Galaxia. The 1979 Spanish general election had the following results for the Congress of Deputies:

- UCD: 168 seats
- PSOE: 121 seats
- PCE: 23 seats
- CD: 9 seats
- CiU: 8 seats
- PNV: 7 seats
- Others: 14 seats

CD was the new name for Fraga's Alianza Popular, and CiU was a coalition of conservative Catalan parties.

UCD was a conglomerate party with many factions, as it was built from the existing government by Adolfo Suárez. This conglomerate started showing divisions with the arguments about laws on divorce and especially in the autonomous statutes. The pressure from opposing factions and from the opposition wore down Adolfo Suárez until he resigned from the party and also resigned from his position as President of the Government. Suárez publicly announced his resignation in TVE, on 25 June 1981. This was a surprise for most people, as it was a completely unexpected move from Suárez.

The next UCD congress in February took place amongst great tension. Leopoldo Calvo Sotelo was voted candidate for the Presidency of the Government for UCD and was to be invested President on 23 February.

On the day of his investiture, Antonio Tejero broke into the Congress and held all deputies at gunpoint in an attempted coup d'état. The army's discontent was caused because of the autonomous statutes which they thought compromised Spain's unity. However, this coup d'état failed because the King called for the military powers to obey legal civilian authority. The next morning, Tejero surrendered, and the democracy was saved.

In October 1981, entry to NATO was approved in Congress with the open opposition of left-wing groups. The Socialist Party PSOE, the main opposition party, promised a referendum on NATO if it (PSOE) got into government. New elections were called in which the UCD suffered a heavy loss, giving PSOE a huge majority in both the Senate and the Congress of Deputies. PSOE during this time also abandoned Marxist ideology in favour of more moderate tendencies. The massive gain of CP, led by Manuel Fraga, was caused by the disappearance of UCD from the political spectrum.

Results of the 1982 Spanish general election for Congress of Deputies were:

- PSOE: 202 seats
- CP: 106 seats
- CiU: 12 seats
- UCD: 12 seats
- PNV: 8 seats
- PCE: 4 seats
- Others: 6 seats

The PSOE was the first party to rule over Spain with a majority in the history of Spain's democracy. The transition to democracy was said to be completed here because a centre-left party took over the government from a centre-right party with no consequences.

== Spain under Felipe González (1982–1996) ==
Felipe González became Prime Minister (Presidente del Gobierno in Spanish) after PSOE's victory in the elections. PSOE at that time, though it had renounced its Marxist ideology, still had a populist current, led by Alfonso Guerra, as opposed to a neo-liberal one, led by Miguel Boyer. This would cause divisions in the party which would not show up until years later.

In González's first term, several measures were adopted, but with moderation – something that contrasted with their program, which was much more radical. The main bills passed in this period were legalized abortion, increased personal freedoms, and a reorganization of the education in Spain. In addition, however, this period marked the appearance of the Grupos Antiterroristas de Liberación (GAL), mercenary counter-terrorist forces organised and paid by the government which assassinated various terrorists, and the expropriation of RUMASA, a trust operated by a member of Opus Dei. Also during this period, Spain joined the European Economic Community, and a referendum (as promised by PSOE) was called on Spain remaining in NATO on 12 March 1986. This time, however, the socialists campaigned in favour of NATO, the parties to the left of PSOE campaigned against NATO, and the right, led by Manuel Fraga, campaigned for abstention. In the referendum, the Spanish population opted to remain in NATO with a 52.2% vote in favour, but with considerable abstention.

The 1986 Spanish general election was called on 28 June 1986 for both chambers.

- PSOE: 184 seats
- CP: 105 seats
- CDS: 19 seats
- CiU: 18 seats
- IU: 7 seats
- PNV: 6 seats
- HB: 5 seats
- Others: 6 seats

PSOE maintained its majority in both chambers, but it lost some seats, and CDS, the new centre party led by Adolfo Suárez, became the third party. Izquierda Unida (IU) is a conglomerate of left-wing parties led by the PCE. Lastly, Herri Batasuna (HB) is a Basque separatist political party, recently banned for its ties to ETA.

PSOE's majority meant it could pass laws without the need for consensus between all the political parties. So, there was great stability, but there was no real parliament debate. There was practically no political opposition, but a social opposition started growing in the end of the 80s, consisting of two fronts: the student front, and the syndicalist front. This last front exerted a great amount of pressure, even calling for a general strike on 14 December 1988, due to the liberalizing of the economic policies. On this day, eight million Spaniards did not go to work, which accounted for 90% of the total work force in Spain. Faced with these problems, PSOE had to call for elections one year earlier, on 29 October 1989.

The results of the 1989 Spanish general election were:

- PSOE: 175 seats
- PP: 107 seats
- CiU: 18 seats
- IU: 17 seats
- CDS: 14 seats
- PNV: 5 seats
- HB: 4 seats
- Others: 10 seats

PSOE stood just on the border of the majority now (175 seats of 350), but it was able to pass laws because of the absence of HB's deputies. People's Party (PP) was the new name for CP, and it became consolidated as the second largest party. From 1991, PSOE started losing its urban vote in favour of PP, adding this to various scandals: the FILESA case, an organization built to illegally raise funds for PSOE, influence peddling and prevarication cases, internal divisions between the populist and the liberal currents started showing up. Under these conditions, the 1993 Spanish general election was called on 6 June 1993 with the following results:

- PSOE: 159 seats
- PP: 141 seats
- IU: 18 seats
- CiU: 17 seats
- PNV: 5 seats
- CC: 4 seats
- Others: 6 seats

PSOE managed to achieve a relative majority despite all the corruption and scandals. However, it had to draw a deal with CiU, a Catalan centre-right party. This caused frequent tensions and accusations from the opposition that PSOE was giving more money and power to Catalonia in exchange for CiU's support. Coalicion Canaria (CC) was formed by a conglomerate of liberal Canarian regionalist parties.

This legislature was a failure due to the vulnerability to the continuous attacks from the opposition and new corruption scandals – the most famous one was the Guardia Civil's director, Luis Roldán. Facing this, PSOE had to call for early elections on 3 March 1996.

The result of the 1996 Spanish general election was:

- PP: 156 seats
- PSOE: 141 seats
- IU: 21 seats
- CiU: 16 seats
- PNV: 5 seats
- Others: 7 seats

PP won these elections and was able to enter the government after acquiring support from the various Catalan, Canarian and Basque groups.

== Spain under José María Aznar (1996–2004) ==
José María Aznar became prime minister of Spain thanks to the support from CiU, PNV, and CC. During his first term, his main objective was an economic policy to allow convergence with the euro, and several public enterprises were privatized.

In the 2000 Spanish general election on 12 March 2000, the PP obtained a majority of seats:

- PP: 183 seats
- PSOE: 125 seats
- CiU: 15 seats
- IU: 8 seats
- PNV: 7 seats

In his second term, without needing the support from the autonomic parties, Aznar was able to apply his party's program more freely, but not without controversy.

Again, the government's focus was on economy, and some of its reforms were strongly criticized by the syndicates. The economic policy caused an increase in the price of butane, gasoline, and tobacco, that led to an increase in the price of other goods that increased with the arrival of euro.

The most controversial aspects of this second term were:

- The 2002 general strike (due to the labour policies)
- The reform of university studies by decree
- The application of the National Hydrologic Plan (which included several transfers, being the most important the one from the river Ebro to south-eastern Spain).
- The ill-managed accident of the oil carrier Prestige, which caused a big oil spill in the Galician coast.
- Support of the US-led Iraq War against public opinion, even sending soldiers there.

Aznar is also said to have had a more tense relationship with the King, unlike his predecessor, whose friendship with the King still lasts today.

One of the most peculiar events of his second term was when Spain and Morocco had some disagreements about Perejil Island, an island with an area less than a square kilometer, near the coast of Morocco. Morocco brought some forces to that island. After some days of diplomatic conversations, Morocco didn't withdraw the few troops that were there. Finally, Spain brought a helicopter and some troops to the island, and drove them back to Morocco.

Even though Spanish laws do not limit the terms in office of a President, Aznar voluntarily decided to not run for a third term. Interior Minister Mariano Rajoy was elected by his party as new leader. While initial polls gave him good chances of winning, the campaign's last weeks and the Madrid train bombings on 11 March 2004, just three days before elections took place, changed the tide of the vote.

Internally and outwards, the attacks were seen as the result of Spain support to the US in the Iraq War.

The 2004 Spanish general election saw PSOE, led by José Luis Rodríguez Zapatero, win a plurality of seats in Congress of Deputies, and it was able to form a government with the support of minor parties.

- PSOE: 164 seats
- PP: 148 seats
- CiU: 10 seats
- ERC: 8 seats
- PNV: 7 seats
- IU: 5 seats
- CC: 3 seats
- BNG: 2 seats

== Spain under José Luis Rodríguez Zapatero (2004–2011) ==
Because he failed to secure a majority in the 2004 election, José Luis Rodríguez Zapatero became prime minister with the support of IU, Republican Left of Catalonia (ERC) and Canarian Coalition (CC). This is not a coalition, however, and each law must be individually negotiated.

As promised during the electoral campaign, Zapatero removed all Spanish soldiers from Iraq. His government also approved a same-sex marriage law for Spain. This law was supported by the majority of the Spanish population. However, the Roman Catholic Church and social conservatives, many of whom were associated with the Partido Popular, strongly opposed it.

Unlike his predecessor, in the international arena Zapatero was more supportive of the United Nations.

His relations with the United States became strained following the withdrawal of Spanish forces from Iraq, and the new relationship Zapatero built with two of the Iraq War's most vocal critics, France and Germany, until those countries elected new leaders. As Zapatero had vocally supported the incumbents, he strained relationships with the new leaders.

== Spain under Mariano Rajoy (2011–2018) ==
Further information: Premiership of Mariano Rajoy

Mariano Rajoy became prime minister after his party gained a majority in the 2011 elections. His tenure has been marked by the continuation of the 2008–14 Spanish financial crisis and the application of harsh austerity measures and spending cuts, as well as the adoption of a new labor law reform in early 2012 which resulted in 2 general strikes that year. The eruption of a major party illegal financing scandal has eroded his government's popularity.

In 2014, Prime Minister Mariano Rajoy announced the planned abdication of King Juan Carlos, saying Prince Felipe was well prepared to be the next King of Spain.

During the term of Rajoy, Carles Puigdemont declared the independence of Catalonia amid the 2017–18 Spanish constitutional crisis and the 2017 Barcelona-Cambrils terrorist attacks.

In May 2018, Mariano Rajoy was defeated in a no-confidence vote in parliament, meaning Socialist leader Pedro Sánchez took over as Spain's new prime minister.

== Spain under Pedro Sánchez (2018-present) ==
On 2 June 2018, The leader of Spanish Socialist Workers' Party (PSOE), Pedro Sánchez was sworn in as the country's new prime minister by King Felipe. As an atheist, Sánchez took the oath to protect the constitution without a bible or crucifix - a first in Spain's modern history.

In November 2019, Socialist Party (PSOE) of Prime Minister Pedro Sánchez won the highest number of seats but fell short of an absolute majority in the parliamentary election. The conservative Popular Party (PP) was the second, but far-right group Vox got the most significant rise.

In January 2020, after months of political stalemate, Pedro Sánchez formed the first coalition government since the return to democracy in the 1970s. Sánchez formed a coalition with Pablo Iglesias, the leader of the smaller and more left-wing Unidas Podemos party.

Following the general election on 23 July 2023, Sánchez once again formed a coalition government, this time with Sumar (successors of Unidas Podemos).

== See also ==
- Contemporary history of Spain
