= Fundamental Laws of the Realm =

Set of constitutional laws organizing the powers of the Francoist regime in Spain

The Fundamental Laws of the Realm (Spanish: Leyes Fundamentales del Reino) were a set of de facto constitutional laws organizing the powers of the Francoist regime in Spain, the dictatorship of Generalissimo Francisco Franco. In 1977, during the transition to democracy, an eighth law with the same status as the others was brought into effect, altering the legislative framework in order to bring to a head the process of political reform. Rather than a typical constitution, the laws were fueros, a distinctly Spanish legal concept dating to medieval times with a wide range of meanings, as they had not been developed or approved by elected representatives.

The Fundamental Laws were ultimately revoked by the Spanish Constitution of 1978. The dismissal of the Fundamental Laws had an impact abroad in Chile where Augusto Pinochet's advisor Jaime Guzmán studied them while drafting the Constitution of Chile of 1980 in order to armour the new constitution against reform.

The eight laws were:

1. The Labour Fuero of 1938: Influenced by the Italian Labour Charter of 1927, it regulated the labour conditions and economic life of Spain. Though it established a minimum wage and limits on the length of the working day, these concessions were subordinate to the national interest.

2. The Law Constituting the Cortes of 1942: Created with an eye to a coming Allied victory in World War II. It recreated the Cortes as a limited instrument of collaboration, for creating and promulgating new laws. The first Cortes of Francoist Spain was inaugurated on 18 July 1942.

3. The Fuero of the Spaniards of 1945: Fixed the rights and duties of the Spanish people. One intent was to convey an impression of formal democratisation to the Potsdam Conference.

4. The National Referendum Law of 1945: Established the use of referendums to settle important points. The Law of Succession made it obligatory to hold a referendum to change the fundamental laws.

5. The Law of Succession to the Headship of the State of 1947: Regulated the Succession; the monarchy of Spain was de jure restored. Franco would remain head of state for life. Created the Council of the Realm and the Council of the Regency. The law was approved by a referendum on 6 July 1947.

6. The Law of the Principles of the National Movement of 1958: Established some organising principles for the judiciary of Franco's Spain, and enshrined into law the principles of Francoism per se.

7. The Organic Law of the State of 1967: Enumerated the ends of the state and fixed the powers and duties of the Head of State, as well as creating formally the office of Chief of Government. The law was approved by a referendum on 14 December 1966.

8. The Political Reform Law of 1977: Political reform was begun in 1976. This law established the minimum conditions for the election of a new Cortes by universal suffrage, and authorised it to carry out the constitutional reforms of the transition. The law was approved by a referendum on 15 December 1976. Thus, in the State's time of rupture, the existing legal structures were used to create a parliamentary monarchy.

== See also ==
- Basic Laws of Israel, a similar set of de facto constitutional laws enacted in place of a constitution.

== Bibliography ==
- «El franquismo» Leyes fundamentales del Estado franquista. Infoguerracivil.com. Consultado el 31 de agosto de 2009.
