= 1966 Spanish organic law referendum =

- 14 December 1966
- Do you approve of the Organic Law of the State Bill?

Results
Choice	Votes	%
Yes	18,130,612	98.15%
No	342,338	1.85%
Valid votes	18,472,950	97.67%
Invalid or blank votes	440,687	2.33%
Total votes	18,913,637	100.00%
Registered voters/turnout	21,301,540	88.79%

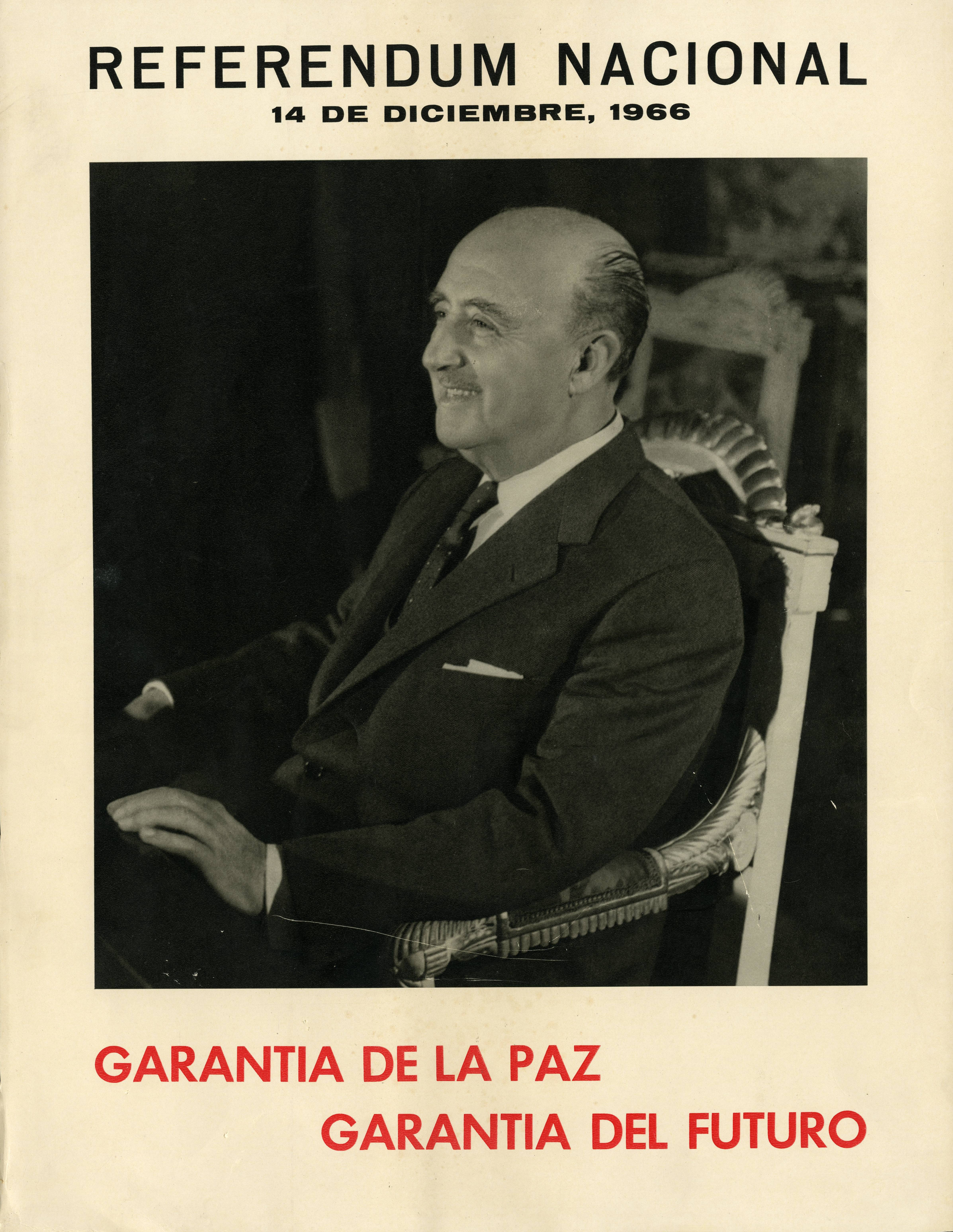
Government propaganda poster asking for the affirmative vote in the referendum.

A referendum on the new constitution or organic law was held in Spain on 14 December 1966, with all Spaniards over age 21 being allowed to participate. The question asked was "Do you approve of the Organic Law of the State Bill?" (Spanish: ¿Aprueba el Proyecto de Ley Orgánica del Estado?). It was approved by 98% of valid votes on a turnout of 89%.

The Organic Law took effect as of 1 January 1967 and remained in place until the constitution of 1978 was enacted by a referendum the same year, following Franco's death and the resumption of parliamentary government through a fully and directly elected assembly.

== The law ==
The new constitution, the Organic Law of the State (Spanish: Ley Orgánica del Estado), stipulated a slight restraint on General Francisco Franco's autocratic powers as the Head of State, limiting such powers to the formulation of general state policy, representing Spain in foreign relations as well as to ratifying treaties and exercising supreme command of the Armed Forces and serving as the head of the Movimiento Nacional—the coalition of political, economic and military sectors supporting the dictatorship and the right to legislate by decree.

The proposed Organic Law also designated an office of "Chief of Government" that would manage the day-to-day operations of the government and be responsible to the Cortes for a government program alongside the Government, as well as carrying out the general policy of the State formulated by the Head of State. Such an office would be separate and independent from that of Head of State—in practice, both would be held concurrently by Franco himself until 1973—serving terms of five years, nominated by the Council of the Realm and approved by the Head of State. After a Law of Succession was approved in a 1947 referendum, the Headship of State would be replaced by that of King of Spain with the same authorities and functions after Franco's death.

The choice of heir belonged to the Head of State alone, to be confirmed in the Cortes Españolas by a two-thirds majority and subsequently passed on through inheritance. The Organic Law also included a provision that the Council of the Realm be reduced from 17 members to 13 (ten elected by the Cortes, seven appointed by the Chief of State), and the Cortes from 611 deputies to 403 (108 directly elected, 25 appointed by the Head of State, with the rest elected by corporate bodies), and confirmed freedom of religion for Spanish Jews and Protestants. The Cortes was also given greater legislative powers by the Law.

== Results ==
Choice	Votes	%
For	18,130,612	98.15
Against	342,338	1.85
Total	18,472,950	100.00
Valid votes	18,472,950	97.67
Invalid/blank votes	440,687	2.33
Total votes	18,913,637	100.00
Registered voters/turnout	21,301,540	88.79
Source: Nohlen & Stöver

== See also ==
- 1966 Spanish organic law referendum in Spanish Sahara
