= 1966 Spanish organic law referendum in Spanish Sahara =

A referendum on the new constitution or organic law of Spain was held in Spanish Sahara on 14 December 1966 as part of the wider Spanish referendum. The Organic Law of the State (Spanish: Ley Orgánica del Estado) was approved by 95% of voters in Spanish Sahara and 98% of voters overall.

== Results ==
Choice	Votes	%
For		94.6
Against		5.4
Total		
Registered voters/turnout	18,802	94.2
Source: Sternberger et al.
