= Law of succession =

Laws of succession govern the order of succession to various monarchies. Some laws of succession include:

== Current monarchies ==
=== United Kingdom ===
- British succession
  - Act of Settlement 1701

=== Denmark ===
- Succession to the Danish throne

=== Norway ===
- Norwegian Law of Succession

=== Sweden ===
- Swedish Act of Succession

=== Spain ===
- Law of Succession to the Headship of the State

=== Japan ===
- Imperial Household Law

=== Thailand ===
- 1924 Palace Law of Succession

== Former monarchies ==
=== France ===
- Kings of France
  - Salic law
- Legitimist claimants to the throne of France
- Orléanist claimants to the throne of France
- Bonapartist claimants to the throne of France
- Jacobite claimants to the throne of France

=== Russia ===
- Russian law of succession 1797

== General ==
- Agnatic succession
- Elective monarchy
- Primogeniture
- Proximity of blood
- Ultimogeniture
- Tanistry
