= Law of Succession to the Headship of the State =

1947 law of Francoist Spain

Law of Succession to the Headship of the State Ley de Sucesión en la Jefatura del Estado

Cortes Españolas
- Territorial extent: Spain (Francoist regime and transition)
- Enacted by: Cortes Españolas
- Enacted: 7 June 1947
- Commenced: 27 July 1947
- Repealed: 29 December 1978

Legislative history
- Introduced by: Franco III Government
- Introduced: 28 March 1947

Repealed by
- Constitution of Spain

Related legislation
- Fundamental Laws of the Realm

Summary
- Appointed Francisco Franco as the Head of State of Spain for life, and gave him the right to name his own successor

Text of statute as originally enacted
- Status: Repealed

The Law of Succession to the Headship of the State (Spanish: Ley de Sucesión en la Jefatura del Estado) was the fifth of the eight Fundamental Laws of the Realm organizing the powers of the Francoist regime in Spain. It established provisions for the restoration of the Spanish monarchy (after being abolished by the Second Spanish Republic in 1931), and appointed Francisco Franco as the Head of State of Spain for life. It provided that his successor would be proposed by Franco himself with the title of King or Regent of the Kingdom, but that would have to be approved by the Cortes Españolas.

The draft of the Law was sent by the Franco III Government to the Cortes on 28 March 1947. It had a short elaboration process and was approved by the Cortes in its session of 7 June 1947 and submitted to a referendum on 6 July 1947, coming into force on 27 July 1947.

== Legal content ==
The fundamental and key objects of the Law were:

1. Constituting Spain as the Kingdom and as a Catholic state (Article 1: "Spain, as a political unit, is a Catholic, social and representative State that, according to its tradition, is declared a Kingdom").

2. Converting the position of Head of State in a position for life in the person of Franco (Article 2: "The Head of State corresponds to the Leader of Spain and the Crusade, Generalissimo of the Armies, Don Francisco Franco Bahamonde").

3. Creating the Council of the Realm (Article 4).

4. Establishing the prerogative of the Head of State to propose to the Cortes, at any time, the person who should be called to succeed him, as a King or Regent and its possible revocation. (Article 6: "At any time the Head of State may propose to the Cortes the person he considers to be called to succeed him, as a King or Regent, with the conditions required by this Law, and may, likewise, submit to the approval of the former the revocation of the one proposed, even if it had already been accepted by the Cortes").

5. Defining and enumerating for the first time the body of the Fundamental Laws of the Realm that became a substitute for rigid constitution, whose repeal demanded the agreement of the Cortes and the confirmation by a referendum (Article 10).

== The position of Infante Juan ==
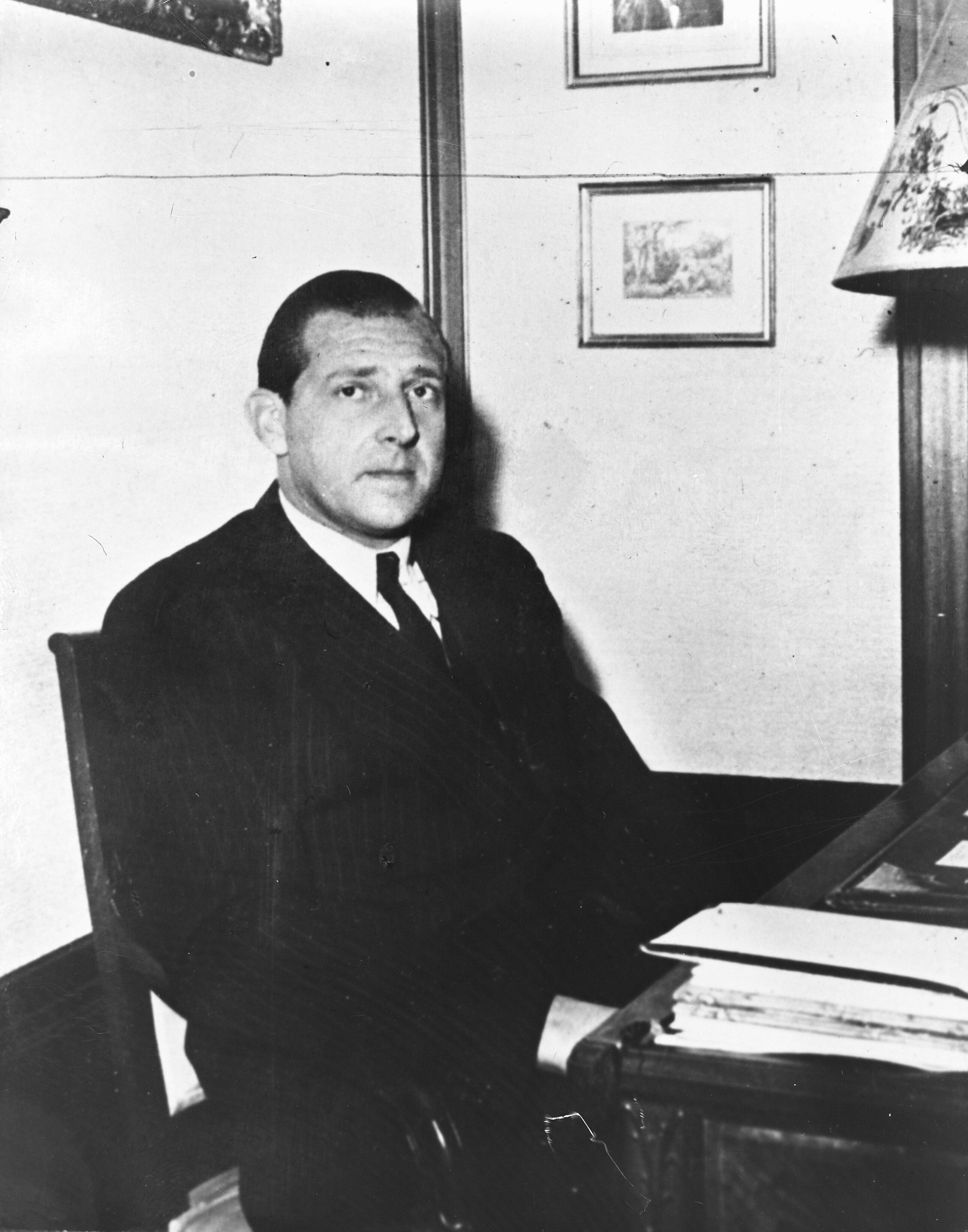
Infante Juan (pictured in 1946).

=== The Manifesto of Lausanne ===
On 19 March 1945, Infante Juan, Count of Barcelona (son of the King Alfonso XIII and legitimate heir to the throne) published the Manifesto of Lausanne (in Lausanne, Switzerland) in which he harshly criticized the Francoist dictatorship and offered the Spanish people the possibility of restoring a monarchy whose character was poorly defined. In fact, he presented the constitutional monarchy as a moderate alternative to the regime, rejecting the Franco regime inspired by German and Italian totalitarian systems that had failed. He promised, in case of return to the monarchy, the approval of a new constitution, the recognition of human rights, the guarantee of public liberties, the establishment of a democratic legislative assembly, the recognition of the country's diversity, the amnesty of political prisoners and a fairer distribution of wealth.

It is for this reason that Franco hesitated to designate Infante Juan as a possible successor.

On 31 March 1947, the then undersecretary of the Presidency Luis Carrero Blanco, envoy of Francisco Franco and editor of the Law of Succession, informed Infante Juan that with the approval of the Law of Succession it would be Franco who would appoint the monarch of the kingdom "when he considers it convenient". He also told Infante Juan that he could be "King of Spain, but of Spain of the Movimiento Nacional, which is Catholic, anti-communist and anti-liberal".

=== The Manifesto of Estoril ===
On 7 April 1947, Infante Juan published the Manifesto of Estoril (in Estoril, Portugal) in which he denounced the illegality of the Law of Succession, because it was proposed to alter the nature of the monarchy without consulting the heir to the throne.

First Manifest of Estoril of Don Juan, 7 April 1947

Spaniards:

General Franco has publicly announced his intention to present to the so-called Cortes a draft Law of Succession to the Head of State, by which Spain is constituted as a Kingdom, and a system is foreseen that is completely opposite to the Laws that have historically regulated the succession to the Crown.

At such a critical time for the political stability of the country, I cannot help but address you, as the legitimate representative of your Monarchy, to express my attitude towards such a serious attempt.

The principles that govern the succession of the Crown, and which are one of the basic elements of the legality on which the Traditional Monarchy is based, cannot be modified without the joint action of the King and the Nation legitimately represented in the Cortes. What is now being done lacks both essential concurrences, since neither the holder of the Crown intervenes nor can it be said that the body that, under the name of Cortes, is nothing more than a mere governmental creation, embodies the will of the Nation. The Law of Succession that was born in such conditions would suffer from a substantial defect of nullity.

The underlying issue raised by the project is just as serious, or even more so. Without taking into account the pressing need that Spain feels for stable institutions, without realizing that what the country wants is to get out as soon as possible of an increasingly dangerous interim period, without understanding that the hostility that surrounds the country in the world is born in large part from the presence of General Franco as Head of State, what is now intended is purely and simply to convert this personal dictatorship into a lifelong one, to validate some titles, apparently precarious up to now, and to disguise with the glorious mantle of the Monarchy a regime of pure governmental arbitrariness, the need for which has long since ceased to exist.

Tomorrow History, today the Spanish people, would not forgive me if I remained silent in the face of the attack that is intended to be perpetrated against the very essence of the hereditary monarchical institution, which is, in the words of our Balmes, one of the greatest and happiest conquests of political science.

The hereditary monarchy is, by its very nature, a basic element of stability, thanks to the institutional permanence that triumphs over the expiration of persons, and thanks to the fixity and clarity of the principles of succession, which eliminate the reasons for discord, and make possible the clash of appetites and factions.

All these supreme advantages disappear in the succession project, which changes fixity into imprecision, which opens the door to all internal disputes, and which dispenses with hereditary continuity, to return, with a lamentable spirit of regression, to one of those imperfect formulas of elective leadership, in which the people tragically debated at the dawn of their political life.

The times are too serious for Spain to add a new constitutional fiction to those that today make up the set of provisions that are intended to be passed off as organic laws of the Nation, and which, furthermore, have never had any practical effect.

Faced with this attempt, I have the inexcusable duty of making a public and solemn affirmation of the supreme principle of legitimacy that I embody, of the imprescriptible rights of sovereignty that the Providence of God has wanted to come together in my person, and that I cannot in conscience abandon because they are born of many centuries of history, and are directly linked to the present and the future of our Spain.

For the same reason that I have placed my supreme desire in being the King of all Spaniards who wish in good faith to abide by a State of Law inspired by the essential principles of the life of the Nation and which binds both governors and governed, I have been and am willing to facilitate everything that will allow for the normal and unconditional transfer of powers. What cannot be asked of me is that I give my consent to acts that imply the failure to fulfill the sacred duty of safeguarding rights that are not only the Crown's, but that form part of the spiritual heritage of the Homeland.

With blind faith in the great destinies of our beloved Spain, you know that you can always count on your King.

JUAN

Estoril, April 7, 1947

== Referendum ==
On 6 July 1947 a referendum was held on the Law, in which, according to the official results, the electorate was composed of 16,187,992 voters. Of them, 14,454,426 voted, of which 12,628,983 (89.86% of the voters) voted affirmatively and 643,501 negatively.

== Consequences ==
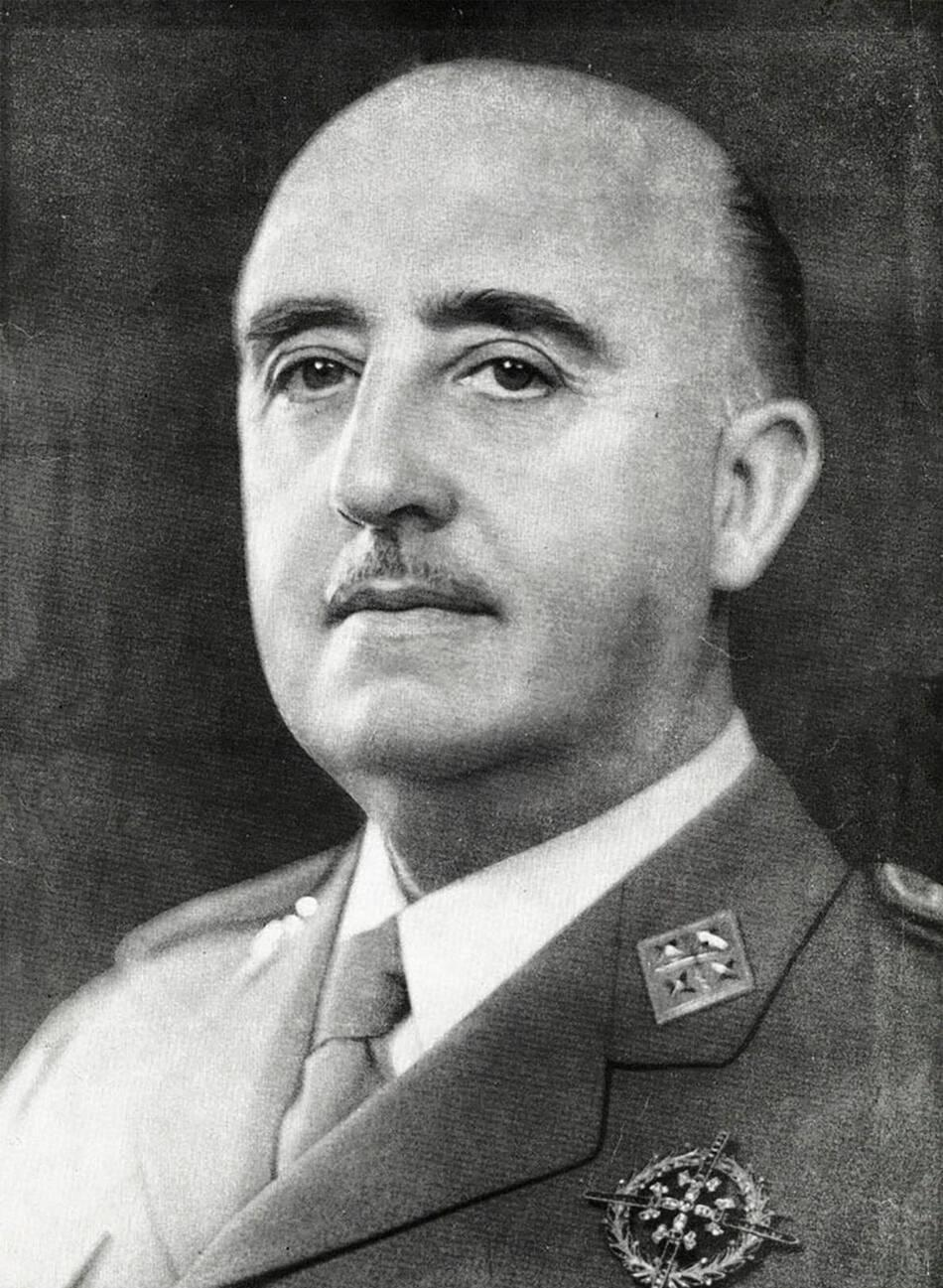
Francisco Franco (pictured in 1964).

From 18 July 1947, by virtue of the Law of Succession, Franco would act as the Head of State of the newly proclaimed Kingdom of Spain, whose throne was vacant and thus would have to remain so at least until the occurrence of what was later called the "succession event", a euphemism for the death of the dictator.

On 25 August 1948, Franco arranged a meeting with Infante Juan, on his holiday yacht El Azor, in the Bay of Biscay. There they agreed that Infante Juan's ten-year-old son, Juan Carlos, born and residing in Rome, Italy would change his residence and complete his education in Spain, along with his brother Alfonso, under the promise of "that the monarchist newspaper ABC could inform freely and that the restrictions of monarchist activities would be lifted".

On 9 November 1948 Juan Carlos was received by Franco at his residence in the Royal Palace of El Pardo, where he informed him that his education would be in charge of a group of professors with firm loyalty to the Movimiento Nacional.

As revealed by the documents declassified by the United States Department of State, due to an accident that occurred on 24 December 1961, during a hunt in the forests of El Pardo, Franco begun to consider the election of his succession. As report from the Greek royal court to the US ambassador in Greece indicates: "following a hunting accident" we are informed that "it is in planning to present the question of the royal succession before the Cortes in February. He has not divulged whether he will recommend the Count of Barcelona or his son, Juan Carlos"; conforming to what was indicated by the Spanish ambassador Luca de Tena.

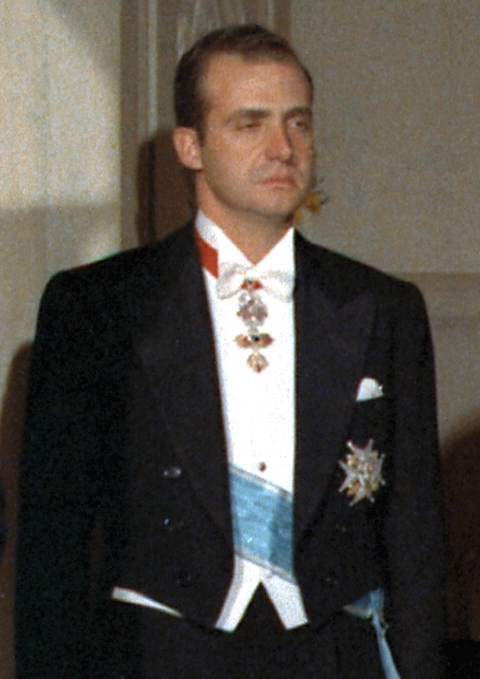
Juan Carlos as Prince of Spain (pictured in 1971).

Finally, on 22 July 1969, Franco designated Juan Carlos (skipping the natural order of succession that corresponded to his father Infante Juan under the law of succession according to which it would be Franco who would name the monarch of the kingdom) as his successor to the Headship of the State, with the title of "Prince of Spain". He was proclaimed as Franco's successor by the Cortes on the same day, when Juan Carlos took an oath of "fidelity to the principles of the National Movement and other Fundamental Laws of the Realm".

== Aftermath ==
During the dictatorship, as the Prince of Spain, Juan Carlos acted briefly (from 19 July to 2 September 1974) as the Head of State due to the fragile health of Franco because of Parkinson's disease.

Franco died on 20 November 1975, and Juan Carlos was proclaimed head of state and crowned as King of Spain on 22 November 1975 at the Palacio de las Cortes, with the regnal name Juan Carlos I, skipping the natural succession order (which corresponded to his father Infante Juan). Subsequent political reforms transformed the Francoist apparatus into a democratic system whose political form of government is the parliamentary monarchy, with a head of state that is subordinated to the constitution and where its acts have to be endorsed (the King reigns but does not govern), and a parliament elected by the people with which the legislative power rests.

It would not be until 14 May 1977 when Infante Juan officially renounced all his dynastic rights (which had been denied by the Law of Succession created by Franco) in favor of his son. The Law of Succession was repealed on 29 December 1978, more than a year and a half after the renunciation of Infante Juan.
