= Death and funeral of Francisco Franco =

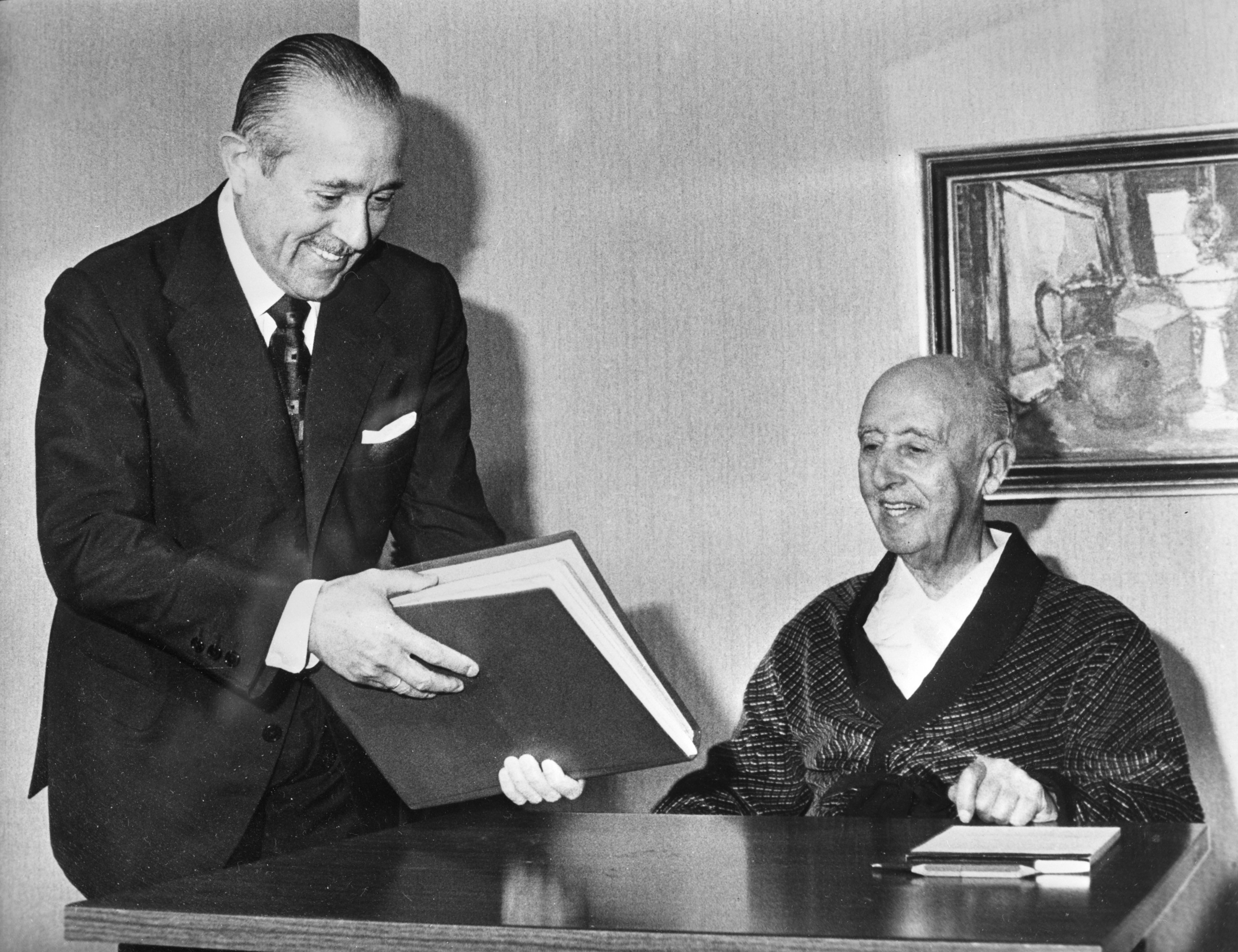
- Carlos Arias Navarro (left) with Franco in October 1975, the month before his death
- Date: 20 November 1975 (death); 23 November 1975 (burial)
- Location: Madrid, Spain

Francisco Franco, the dictator of Spain, died on 20 November 1975 at the age of 82. His designated successor, Prince Juan Carlos de Borbón, was proclaimed King Juan Carlos I on 22 November. The following day, Franco was buried at the Valley of the Fallen. Juan Carlos later led the Spanish transition to democracy.

== Illness ==
On 19 July 1974, the aging Franco fell ill from various health problems, and Juan Carlos took over as acting head of state. Franco recovered and on 2 September resumed his duties as head of state. The following year, he fell ill again, afflicted with further health problems, including a long battle with Parkinson's disease. Franco's last public appearance was on 1 October 1975 when, despite his gaunt and frail appearance, he gave a speech to crowds from the balcony at the Royal Palace of Madrid, warning the people that there was a "Masonic, Leftist and Communist conspiracy against Spain". On 30 October, as his illness intensified, Franco permanently transferred his duties to Juan Carlos. The medical team tending him was headed by his son-in-law, Dr. Cristóbal Martínez-Bordiú.

On 3 November, Franco fell into a coma due to gastrointestinal bleeding. He was transferred to the La Paz hospital four days later, where he underwent several operations resulting in the removal of most of his stomach. As a result of the perforations made during his treatment, he contracted acute peritonitis, which led to multiple organ failure.

Meanwhile, on 6 November, roughly 350,000 Moroccan unarmed civilians crossed into the disputed Spanish colony of Spanish Sahara under the auspices of king Hassan II of Morocco. Spanish troops were ordered not to fight them and to clear land mines protecting the border to avoid bloodshed. On 14 November, the government led by prince Juan Carlos and premier Carlos Arias Navarro agreed to cede the colony to Morocco and Mauritania by the Madrid Accords, without considering the opinion of native Sahrawis.

By 19 November, he was clinically dead, and his family eventually agreed to disconnect his life support machines.

== Death ==
According to the government, Franco died from heart failure at 5:25 am on 20 November 1975, the 39th anniversary of the death of José Antonio Primo de Rivera, the founder of the Falange. This account is disputed by historian Ricardo de la Cierva, who said that he had been told around 6 pm on 19 November that Franco had already died. Franco was 82 years old.

León Herrera Esteban, the minister of information, made the first official announcement of Franco's death at 6:05 am on Radio Nacional de España. Prime Minister Carlos Arias Navarro later made a televised speech to the nation, which became well-known for his opening the speech with the phrase "Spaniards, Franco has died" (Españoles, Franco ha muerto). He then read a message from Franco, believed to have been written during his final illness in October, asking the people to "extend the same affection and support you have given me to the future King of Spain, Don Juan Carlos de Borbón". After the announcement, television and radio stations switched to religious or classical music. The government declared a national mourning period of thirty days and lowered flags on public buildings to half-mast.

== Proclamation of Juan Carlos I ==
Proclamation of Juan Carlos I
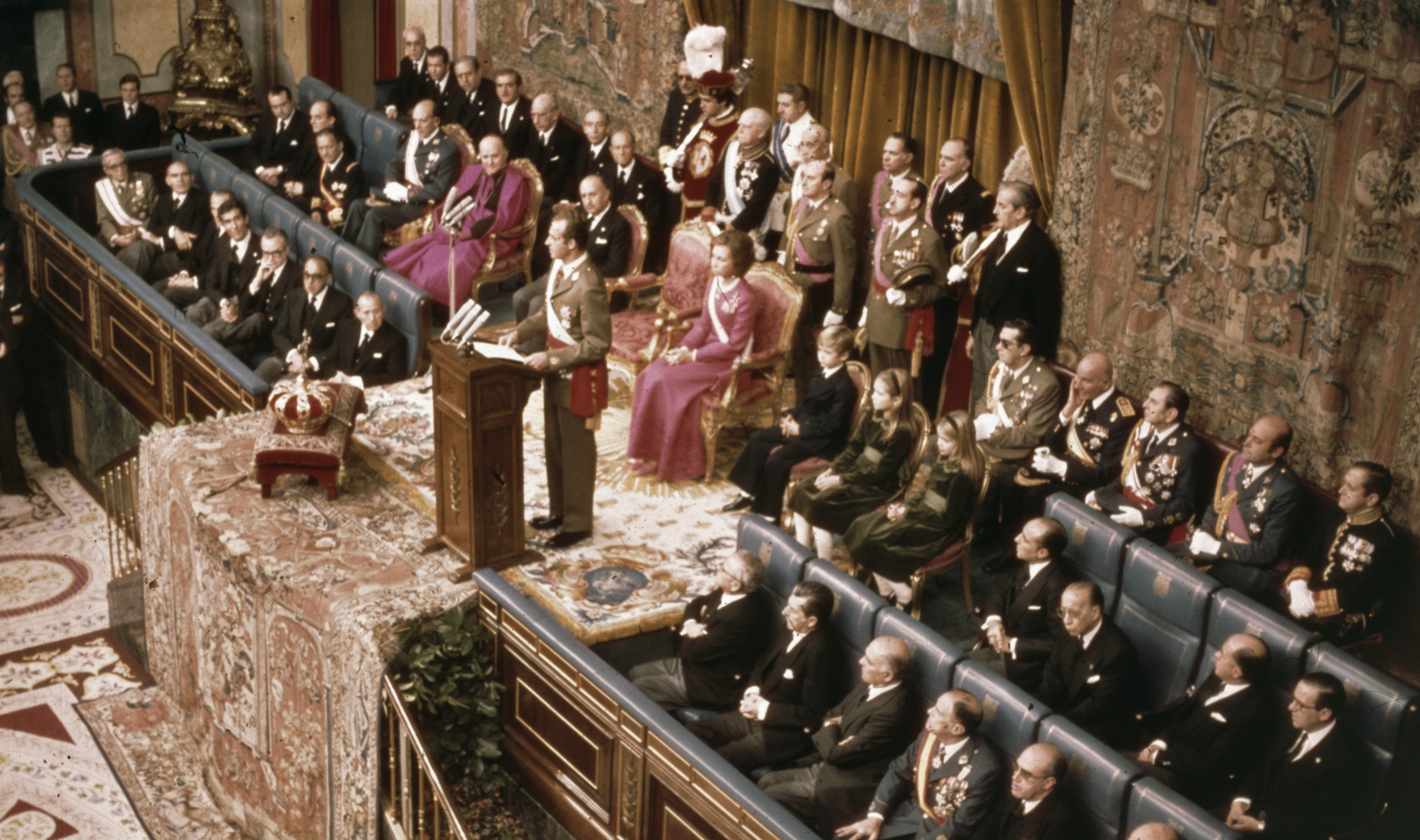
- Juan Carlos I addressing the Cortes Españolas
- Date: 22 November 1975
- Location: Palacio de las Cortes, Madrid, Spain

Following Franco's death, a regency council (composed of Alejandro Rodríguez de Valcárcel, Archbishop Pedro Cantero Cuadrado and Lieutenant General Ángel Salas Larrazábal) assumed interim rule. On 22 November, Juan Carlos was proclaimed king during a joint session of the Francoist Cortes Españolas, in which he swore to uphold the laws of the National Movement. He then delivered a speech in which he avoided referencing Franco's triumph in the civil war and in which, after expressing his "respect and gratitude" to Franco, he stated that he intended to reach "an effective consensus of national concord". In this way, he made it clear that he did not support the pure "immobilist continuism" advocated by the búnker – which defended the perpetuation of Francoism under the monarchy established by Franco, following the model established in the Organic Law of the State of 1967 – but with a message to the Army to face the future with "serene tranquility" that hinted that the reform would be made from the regime's own institutions. The most enthusiastic round of applause from the Cortes, however, was not for the new king but for members of Franco's family who were present at the proclamation. Juan Carlos's speech was received negatively by members of the anti-Franco opposition. The ceremony had a television audience of at least 300 million in over 30 countries.

== Funeral and burial ==
External videos
- Burial of Francisco Franco - November 23, 1975 - RTVE Archive
- Official announcement by Carlos Arias Navarro - RTVE

Franco's body lay in state in the chapel of the Royal Palace of Madrid from 21 to 23 November.

On 23 November, his coffin, draped in the flag of Francoist Spain, was taken to the Plaza de Oriente for a Requiem Mass conducted by Cardinal Marcelo González Martín, Archbishop of Toledo, and attended by king Juan Carlos and his wife Sofía. Many European governments, which condemned Franco's regime, declined to send high-level representatives to his funeral. Among the few foreign dignitaries who attended were:

- Nelson Rockefeller, Vice President of the United States
- The Lord Shepherd, Leader of the House of Lords of the United Kingdom (Note: Prime Minister Harold Wilson caused controversy within the Labour Party by sending him to represent the United Kingdom government.)
- Prince Rainier III of Monaco
- King Hussein of Jordan
- Imelda Marcos, First Lady of the Philippines and the wife of dictator Ferdinand Marcos
- Hugo Banzer, military president of Bolivia
- Augusto Pinochet, military dictator of Chile, for whom Franco was a role model.

Franco's body was then taken to be buried at the Valley of the Fallen, a colossal memorial built using forced labour from political prisoners, ostensibly to honour the casualties of both sides of the Spanish Civil War. It was located only 10 kilometres (6.2 mi) from the palace, monastery, and royal pantheon of El Escorial built for Philip II. On 1 April 1959, Franco had inaugurated its huge underground basilica as his monument and mausoleum, saying in his own words that it was built "in memory of my victory over communism, which was trying to dominate Spain". The project's architect, Diego Méndez, had constructed a lead-lined tomb for Franco underneath the floor of the transept, behind the high altar of the church, in 1956, a fact unknown to the Spanish people until almost thirty years later.

As the cortège arrived, some 75,000 rightists wearing the blue shirts of the Falangists greeted it with rebel songs from the civil war and fascist salutes. He was buried a few metres from the grave of the Falange's founder, Primo de Rivera. Franco was the only person interred in the Valley who did not die during the civil war.

== Aftermath ==
On 27 November, Juan Carlos participated in an anointing ceremony called the Mass of the Holy Spirit, which took place at the Church of Saint Jerome the Royal, marking the beginning of his reign. It was presided over by Cardinal Vicente Enrique y Tarancón, president of the Spanish Episcopal Conference. The service was attended by many foreign dignitaries, including the president of France, Valéry Giscard d'Estaing; Prince Philip, Duke of Edinburgh; the president of West Germany, Walter Scheel; the president of Ireland, Cearbhall Ó Dálaigh; and crown prince Sidi Mohammed of Morocco. Giscard d'Estaing was reported to have pressured Juan Carlos to personally tell Pinochet that he was not welcome at the service.

In 1984, Jaime Peñafiel's gossip magazine La Revista published pictures of Franco in his hospital bed surrounded by tubes and medical equipment. Martínez-Bordiú acknowledged taking the pictures but claimed that the photographs were stolen from him.

=== Reburial ===
In 2011, a government commission recommended that Franco's remains be transferred from the Valley of the Fallen to a location to be chosen by his family. His remains were reburied at the Mingorrubio Cemetery north of Madrid, where his wife Carmen Polo is also buried, on 24 October 2019.

== See also ==
- Francoist Spain
- Spanish transition to democracy
- "Generalissimo Francisco Franco is still dead"
