= Spanish transition to democracy =

Period of Spanish history (1975–1982)

Spanish State Estado Español (Spanish) (1975–1978) Kingdom of Spain Reino de España (Spanish) (1978–1982)
- 1975–1982
- Flag (1977–1981) Coat of arms (1977–1981)
- Motto: Una, Grande y Libre ("One, Great and Free"); Plus Ultra ("Further Beyond")
- Anthem: Marcha Real ("Royal March")
- The Spanish State in 1976
- Capital and largest city: Madrid
- Official languages: Spanish; After 1978: Catalan, Basque, Galician
- Religion: Catholicism (state religion until 1978)
- Government: Semi-constitutional monarchy (until 1977); Constitutional monarchy (after 1977) (Note: As a transitional government from the date of the 1977 election until the promulgation of the Constitution in December 1978)
- King
  - 1975–1982: Juan Carlos I
- Prime Minister
  - 1975–1976: Carlos Arias Navarro
  - 1976–1981: Adolfo Suárez
  - 1981–1982: Leopoldo Calvo-Sotelo
- Legislature: Cortes Españolas (until 1977); Cortes Generales (from 1977)
  - Upper House: Senate
  - Lower House: Congress of Deputies
- Historical era: Cold War
  - Death of Franco: 20 November 1975
  - Juan Carlos royal ascension: 22 November 1975
  - Political Reform Act: 18 November 1976
  - 1977 Election: 15 June 1977
  - Amnesty Law: 15 October 1977
  - Constitution adopted: 29 December 1978
  - 1979 Election: 1 March 1979
  - Attempted coup d'état: 23 February 1981
  - 1982 election: 28 October 1982

Population
  - 1981: 37,683,363
- Currency: Spanish peseta
- Calling code: +34
Preceded by
1975: Spanish State
Succeeded by
Kingdom of Spain
Moroccan-occupied Western Sahara
Tiris al-Gharbiyya

The Spanish transition to democracy, known in Spain as la Transición (IPA: [la tɾansiˈθjon]; 'the Transition') or la Transición española ('the Spanish Transition'), officially the Spanish State from 1975 to 1978 and Kingdom of Spain thereafter, was a period of modern Spanish history encompassing the regime change that moved from the Francoist dictatorship to the consolidation of a parliamentary system, in the form of constitutional monarchy under Juan Carlos I.

The democratic transition began two days after the death of Francisco Franco, in November 1975. Initially, "the political elites left over from Francoism" attempted "reform of the institutions of dictatorship" through existing legal means, but social and political pressure saw the formation of a democratic parliament in the 1977 general election, which had the imprimatur to write a new constitution that was then approved by referendum in December 1978. The following years saw the beginning of the development of the rule of law and establishment of regional government, amidst ongoing terrorism, an attempted coup d'état and global economic problems. The Transition is said to have concluded after the landslide victory of the Spanish Socialist Workers' Party (PSOE) in the 1982 general election and the first peaceful transfer of executive power. (Note: Some historians suggest an earlier date for the conclusion of the Transition including the 1977 general election, the 1978 Constitution, or the 1981 attempted coup. One writer suggests the Transition only concluded in 2006 with the end of consensus politics and the re-emergence of open debate on divisive issues.)

The end result of the Transition according to Casanova was "at least from 1982 onwards, a parliamentary monarchy, based on a democratic constitution, with a large number of rights and freedoms, the consequence of a complex transition, riddled with conflicts, foreseen and unforeseen obstacles and problems, in the context of economic crisis and political uncertainty." However, as then-prime minister González said later, "the state apparatus was retained, in its entirety, from the dictatorship". Most of the significant aspects in the Transition were adopted by consensus between the governments and the opposition.

While often cited as a paradigm of peaceful, negotiated transition, political violence during the Spanish transition was far more prevalent than during the analogous democratization processes in Greece or Portugal, with the emergence of separatist, leftist, fascist and vigilante terrorist groups and police violence.

The re-democratization also led to Spain's integration into Europe, a dream of Spanish intellectuals since the end of the 19th century. Previous attempts at democratization included the First Spanish Republic and the Second Spanish Republic.

== Political role of Juan Carlos I ==
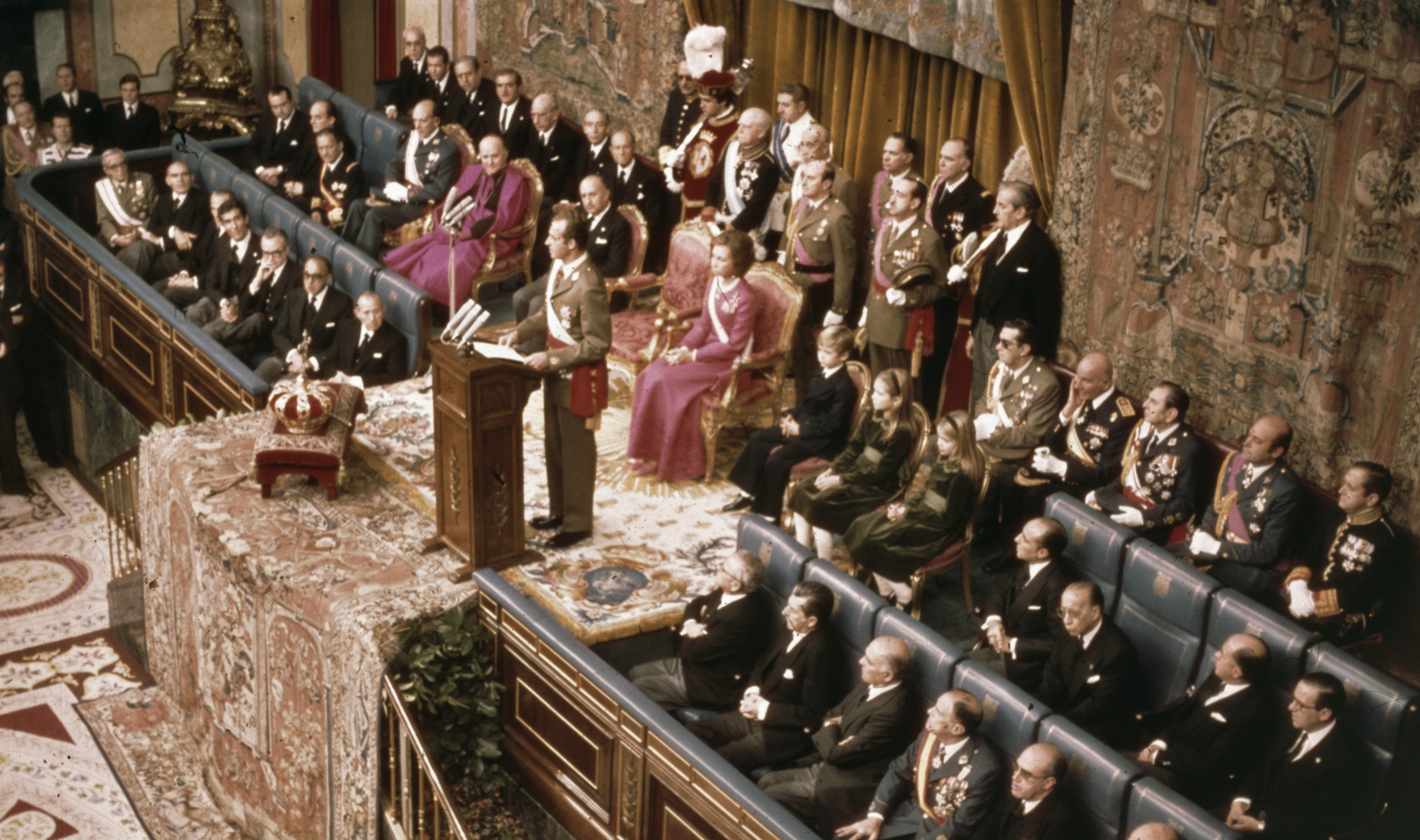
Juan Carlos I before the Cortes Españolas, during his proclamation as King on 22 November 1975

General Francisco Franco came to power in 1939, following the Spanish Civil War (1936–1939), and ruled as a dictator until his death in 1975. In 1969, he designated Prince Juan Carlos, grandson of Spain's most recent king, Alfonso XIII, as his official successor. For the next six years, Prince Juan Carlos remained in the background during public appearances and seemed ready to follow in Franco's footsteps. Once in power as King of Spain, however, he facilitated the development of a constitutional monarchy as his father, Don Juan de Borbón, had advocated since 1946.

King Juan Carlos I began his reign as head of state without leaving the confines of Franco's legal system. As such, he swore fidelity to the Principles of the Movimiento Nacional (National Movement), the political system of the Franco era; took possession of the crown before the Francoist Cortes Españolas; and respected the Organic Law of the State for the appointment of his first head of government. Only in his speech before the Cortes did he indicate his support for a transformation of the Spanish political system. This de facto alliance between Juan Carlos and the political forces opposed to maintaining the status quo is considered to be a key part to the success of Spain’s transition to democracy.

The transition was an ambitious plan that counted on ample support both within and outside of Spain. Western governments, headed by the United States, now favoured a Spanish constitutional monarchy, as did many Spanish and international liberal capitalists. The spectre of the Civil War still haunted Spain. Francoists on the far right enjoyed considerable support within the Spanish Army, and people of the left distrusted a king who owed his position to Franco. The King's legitimacy rested on this appointment; his father, Don Juan, did not renounce his claim until 14 May 1977. Liberal opinion at the time held therefore, that the throne's legitimacy could only be saved by establishing a democratic, constitutional and parliamentary monarchy.

For the transition to succeed, the army needed to refrain from intervening in the political process on behalf of Francoist elements within the existing government. As Raymond Carr explains,

In containing the right and keeping the army loyal to the government the support of the King, as commander-in-chief of the army, was critical, enabling the government to retire factious generals who regarded it as their duty to maintain the existing constitution.

== Government of Carlos Arias Navarro (November 1975 – July 1976) ==
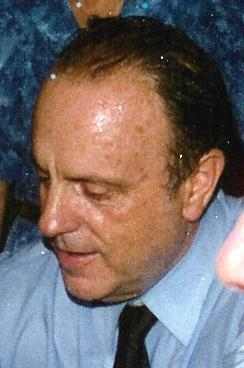
Manuel Fraga Iribarne, the most important Minister of the Arias Navarro government

The King did not initially appoint a new prime minister, leaving in place the incumbent head of government under Franco, Carlos Arias Navarro. Arias Navarro had not initially planned a reform of the Francoist regime; in the National Council of the Movement, an advisory assembly of the ruling FET y de las JONS (Falange) party and other groups in the Movimiento Nacional, he declared that the purpose of his government was the continuity of Francoism through a "democracy in the Spanish way" (Spanish: democracia a la española). He believed political changes should be limited: he would give the parliament, the Cortes Españolas, the task of "updating our laws and institutions the way Franco would have wanted".

The reform programme adopted by the government was the one proposed by Manuel Fraga, rejecting Antonio Garrigues' plan to elect a constituent assembly. Fraga's programme aimed to achieve a "liberal democracy" that was "comparable to the rest of the Western European countries" through a "gradual and controlled process", through a series of reforms of the pseudo-constitutional Fundamental Laws of the Realm. This is why his proposal was dubbed as a "reform in the continuity", and his support came mostly from those who defended a Francoist sociological model.

In order for reform to succeed, it had to earn the support of the hardcore Francoist faction known as the Búnker, which had a major presence in the Cortes and the National Council of the Movement, the two institutions that would have to eventually approve the reforms of the Fundamental Laws. It also had to garner support within the Armed Forces and in the Spanish Labour Organisation. It also needed to appease the democratic opposition to Francoism. The approach towards the dissenters was that they would not be part of the reform process, but would be allowed to participate in politics more generally, with the exception of the Communist Party of Spain (Partido Comunista de España, PCE). This conservative reform was partly inspired by the historical period of the semi-democratic Bourbon Restoration (1876–1931), and was criticised for not taking into account the social and political circumstances of the time.

The project coalesced into a proposal to reform three of the Fundamental Laws, but the exact changes would be determined by a mixed commission of the Government and the National Council of the Movement, as proposed by Torcuato Fernández-Miranda and Adolfo Suárez. The creation of the commission meant that Fraga and the reformists lost control of much of the legislative direction of the country; the reformists had been planning updated "Laws of Assembly and Association", which included a reform of the Spanish Criminal Code. Even so, the new Law of Assembly was passed by the Francoist Cortes on 25 May 1976, allowing public demonstration with government authorization. On the same day the Law of Political Associations was also approved, supported by Suárez, who affirmed in parliamentary session that "if Spain is plural, the Cortes cannot afford to deny it". Suárez's intervention in favor of this reform shocked many, including Juan Carlos I. This intervention was key in Juan Carlos' decision to appoint Suárez as prime minister in the following month.

The Arias-Fraga reform collapsed on 11 June, when the Cortes rejected changes to the Criminal Code, which had previously made it a crime to be affiliated with a political party other than FET y de las JONS. The members of the Cortes, who vehemently opposed the legalization of the Communist Party, added an amendment to the law that banned political organizations that "submitted to an international discipline" and "advocated for the implantation of a totalitarian regime". Javier Tusell pointed out that "those who in the past were in bed with totalitarianism now felt entitled to prohibit the totalitarianism of others". The reforms of the Fundamental Laws governing royal succession and the composition of the Cortes, designed by Fraga, also failed. Fraga had intended to make the Cortes bicameral, with one chamber elected by universal suffrage and the other having an "organic" character.

== First government of Adolfo Suárez (July 1976 – June 1977) ==
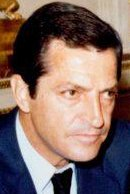
Adolfo Suárez in 1980

Torcuato Fernández-Miranda, the president of the Council of the Realm, placed Adolfo Suárez on a list of three candidates for King Juan Carlos to choose to become the new head of government, replacing Arias Navarro. The king chose Suárez because he felt he could meet the challenge of the difficult political process that lay ahead: persuading the Cortes, which was composed of appointed Francoist politicians, to dismantle Franco's system. In this manner, he would formally act within the Francoist legal system and thus avoid the prospect of military intervention in the political process. Suárez was appointed as the 138th Prime Minister of Spain by Juan Carlos on 3 July 1976, a move that, given his Francoist past, was opposed by leftists and some centrists.

As Prime Minister, Suárez quickly presented a clear political program based on two points:

- The development of a political reform bill, which, once approved by the Cortes and the Spanish public in a referendum, would open the constituent process for creating a liberal democracy in Spain.
- Democratic elections to be held in June 1977 to elect a Cortes charged with drawing up a new democratic constitution

This program was clear and unequivocal, but its realization tested the political capacity of Suárez. He had to convince both the opposition to participate in his plan and the army to allow the process to run uninterrupted, and at the same time needed to bring the situation in the Basque Country under control.

Despite these challenges, Suárez's project was carried out without delay between July 1976 and June 1977. He had to act on many fronts during this short period of time in order to achieve his aims.

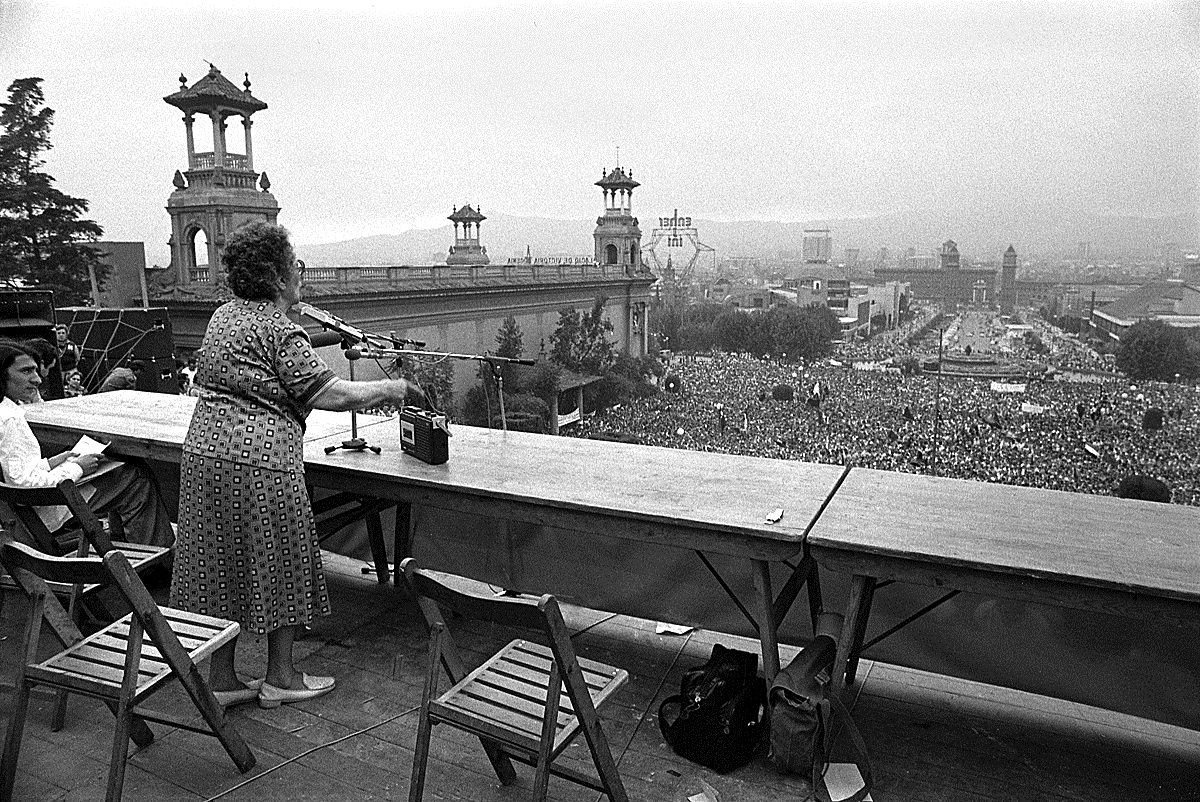
Federica Montseny speaking at the meeting of the CNT in Barcelona in 1977, after 36 years of exile

The draft of the Political Reform Act (Ley para la Reforma Política) was written by Torcuato Fernández-Miranda, speaker of the Cortes, who handed it over to the Suárez government in July 1976. The project was approved by the Suárez Government in September 1976. To open the door to parliamentary democracy in Spain, this legislation could not simply create a new political system by eliminating the obstacles put in place by the Franco regime against democracy: it had to liquidate the Francoist system through the Francoist Cortes itself. The Cortes, under the presidency of Fernández-Miranda, debated this bill throughout the month of November; it ultimately approved it, with 425 votes in favor, 59 against, and 13 abstentions.

The Suárez government sought to gain further legitimacy for the changes through a popular referendum. On 15 December 1976, with a 77.72% participation rate, 94% of voters indicated their support for the changes. From this moment, it was possible to begin the electoral process (the second part of the Suárez program), which would serve to elect the members of the Constituent Cortes, the body that was to be responsible for creating a democratic constitution.

With this part of his plan fulfilled, Suárez had to resolve another issue: should he include the opposition groups who had not participated at the beginning of the transition? Suárez also had to deal with a third problem: coming to terms with the anti-Francoist opposition.

=== Relations of the Suárez government with the opposition ===
Suárez adopted a series of measured policies to add credibility to his project. He issued a partial political amnesty in July 1976, freeing 400 prisoners; he then extended this in March 1977, and finally granted a blanket amnesty in May of the same year. In December 1976, the Tribunal de Orden Público (TOP), a sort of Francoist secret police, was dissolved. The right to strike was legalized in March 1977, with the right to unionize being granted the following month. Also in March, a new electoral system act (Ley Electoral) introduced the necessary framework for Spain's electoral system to be brought into accord with those of other countries that were liberal parliamentary democracies.

Through these and other measures of government, Suárez complied with the conditions that the opposition groups first demanded in 1974. These opposition forces met in November 1976 to create an association of democratic organizations called the Democratic Convergence Platform.

Suárez had initiated political contact with the opposition by meeting with Felipe González, secretary general of the Spanish Socialist Workers' Party (PSOE), in August 1976. The positive attitude of the socialist leader gave further support for Suárez to carry forward his reforms, but everyone clearly perceived that the big problem for the political normalization of the country would be the legalization of the Communist Party (PCE), which at the time had more activists and was more organized than any other group in the political opposition. However, in a meeting between Suárez and the most important military leaders in September, the officers strongly declared opposition to the legalization of the PCE.

The PCE, for its part, acted ever more publicly to express its opinions. According to the Communists, the Political Reform Act was anti-democratic and the elections for the Constituent Cortes should be called by a provisional government including members from the opposition. The Communists particularly, and the opposition more broadly, did not show any enthusiasm for the Political Reform Act. Suárez had to risk even more to involve the opposition forces in his plan.

In December 1976, the PSOE celebrated its 27th Congress in Madrid, and began to disassociate itself from the demands of the PCE, affirming that it would participate in the next call for elections for the Constituent Cortes. At the beginning of 1977, the year of the elections, Suárez confronted the problem of legalizing the PCE. After the public indignation against anti-reformists aroused by the Massacre of Atocha in January 1977, when far-right terrorists murdered labor leaders aligned with the PCE, Suárez opened negotiations with Communist leader Santiago Carrillo in February. Carrillo's willingness to cooperate without prior demands and his offer of a "social pact" for the period after the elections pushed Suárez to take the riskiest step of the transition: the legalization of the PCE in April 1977. However, throughout this critical period the government began a strategy of providing greater institutional space to the Unión General de Trabajadores (UGT) union, more moderate and linked to the Socialists, in comparison to the Communist-oriented CCOO. The manner in which a unified trade union was strategically countered is an important feature of the Spanish transition, as it limited radical opposition and created the basis for a fractured industrial relations system.

=== Relations of the Suárez government with the Spanish army ===
Adolfo Suárez knew well that the Búnker—a group of hard-line Francoists led by José Antonio Girón and Blas Piñar, using the newspapers El Alcázar and Arriba as their mouthpieces—had close contacts with officials in the army and exercised influence over important sectors of the military. The ever-present threat of a coup d’etat from the hardliners required careful navigation.

To resolve the issue, Suárez intended to support himself with a liberal group within the military, centered on General Díez Alegría. Suárez gave the members of this group the positions of authority with the most responsibility. The most notable personality of this faction within the army was General Manuel Gutiérrez Mellado. However, in July 1976, the Vice President for Defense Affairs was General Fernando de Santiago, a member of a hardline group within the army. De Santiago had shown his restlessness before, during the first amnesty in July 1976. He had opposed the law granting the right to unionize. Suárez dismissed Fernando de Santiago, nominating Gutiérrez Mellado instead. This confrontation with General de Santiago caused a large part of the army to oppose Suárez, opposition that further intensified when the PCE was legalized.

Meanwhile, Gutiérrez Mellado promoted officials who supported political reform and removed those commanders of the security forces (the Policía Armada and the Guardia Civil) who seemed to support preserving the Francoist regime.

Suárez wanted to demonstrate to the army that the political normalization of the country meant neither anarchy nor revolution. In this, he counted on the cooperation of Santiago Carrillo, but he could in no way count on the cooperation of terrorist groups.

=== Resurgence of terrorist activity ===
The Basque Country remained, for the better part of this period, in a state of political turbulence. Suárez granted a multi-stage amnesty for numerous Basque political prisoners, but the confrontations continued between local police and protesters. The separatist group ETA, which in the middle of 1976 had seemed open to a limited truce after Franco's death, resumed armed confrontation again in October. The time from 1978 to 1980 would be ETA's three deadliest years ever. However, it was between December 1976 and January 1977 that a series of attacks brought about a situation of high tension in Spain.

The Maoist GRAPO (Grupos de Resistencia Antifascista Primero de Octubre) began its armed struggle by bombing public locations, and then continued with the kidnapping of two important figures of the regime: the President of the Council of the State José María de Oriol, and General Villaescusa, President of the Superior Council of the Military Justice. From the right, during these kidnappings, members of the neo-fascist Alianza Apostólica Anticomunista conducted the Atocha massacre, killing five and wounding four trade unionists in Madrid, in January 1977.

In the midst of these provocations, Suárez convened his first meeting with a significant number of opposition leaders, who published a condemnation of terrorism and gave their support to Suárez's actions. During this turbulent time, the Búnker capitalized on the instability and declared that the country was on the brink of chaos.

Despite the increased violence by the ETA and GRAPO, elections for the Constituent Cortes were carried out in June 1977.

== First elections and the draft of the Constitution ==
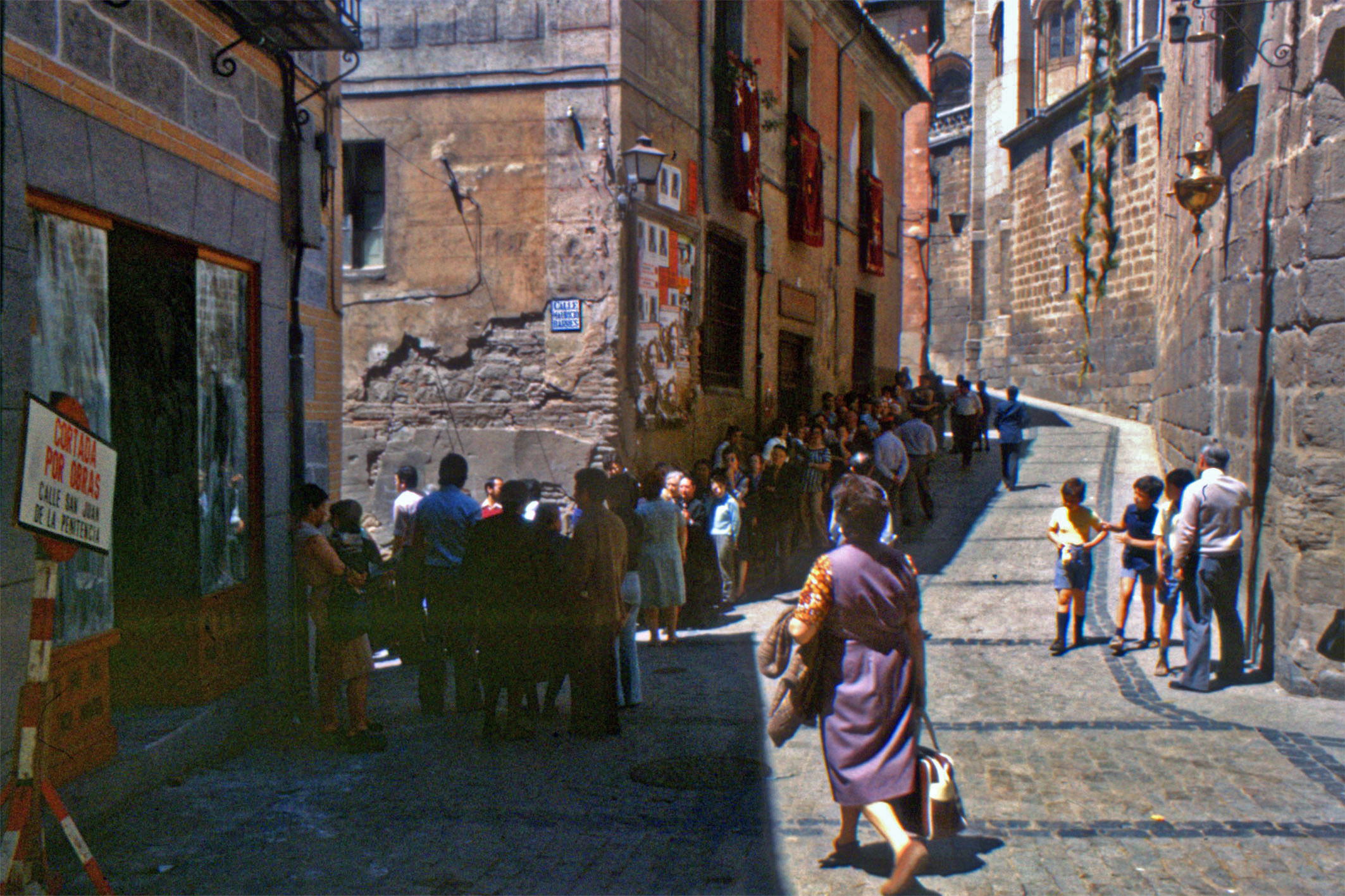
People waiting to vote in the 1977 general election, the first free election since 1936.

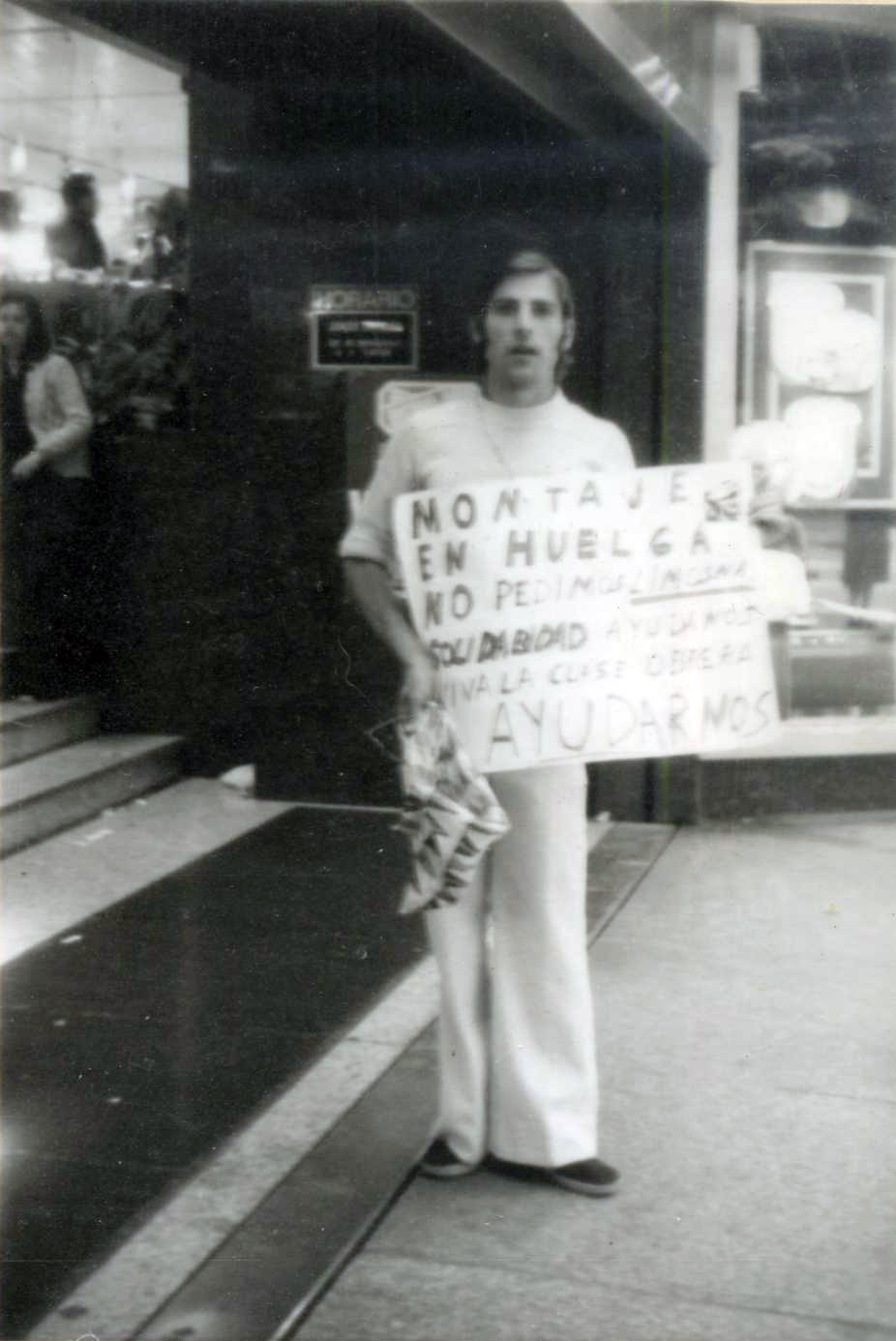
Affected by the delayed 1973–1975 recession, workers went on strike across Spain. This man asks for contributions for the strikers in the assembly sector in Biscay in 1977.

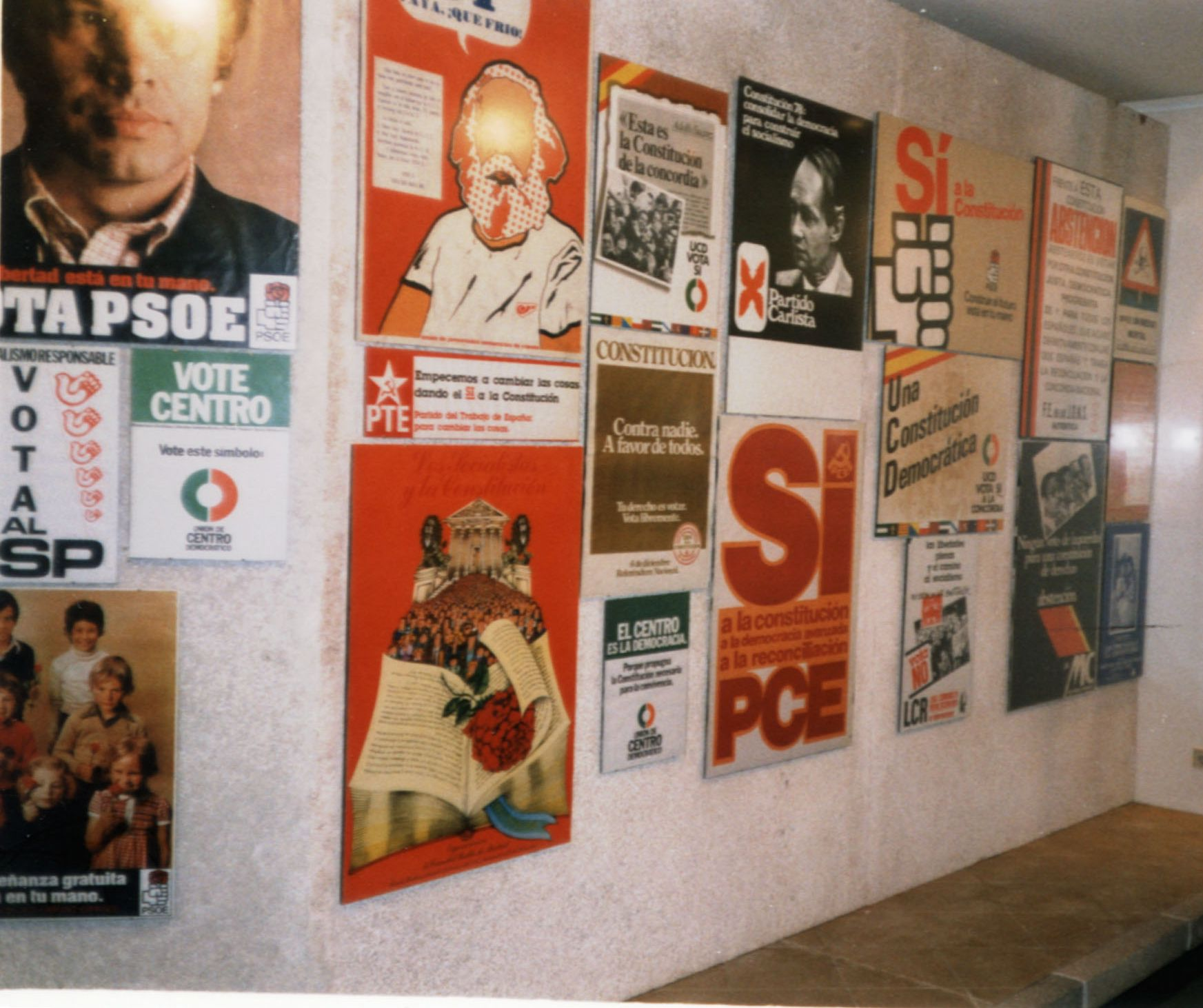
Political posters in an exhibition, celebrating 20 years of the Spanish Constitution of 1978

The elections held on 15 June 1977 confirmed the existence of four important political forces, at the national level. The votes broke down in the following manner:

- Union of the Democratic Centre (UCD, Unión de Centro Democrático): 34.61% and 165 seats
- Spanish Socialist Workers' Party (PSOE, Partido Socialista Obrero Español): 29.27% and 119 seats
- Communist Party of Spain (PCE, Partido Comunista de España): 9.38% and 19 seats
- People's Alliance (AP, Alianza Popular): 8.33% and 16 seats

With the success of the Basque Nationalist Party (Basque: EAJ, Euzko Alderdi Jeltzalea; Spanish: PNV, Partido Nacionalista Vasco) winning 8 seats and the Democratic Pact for Catalonia (PDC, Pacte Democràtic per Catalunya) winning 11 seats in their respective regions, nationalist parties also began to show their political strength in these elections.

The Constituent Cortes (elected Spanish parliament) then began to draft a constitution, in the middle of 1977. In 1978, the Moncloa Pact was passed: an agreement amongst politicians, political parties, and trade unions to plan how to operate the economy, during the transition. The Spanish Constitution of 1978 went on to be approved in a referendum, on 6 December 1978.

== Governments of the UCD ==
Prime Minister Adolfo Suárez's party, the UCD, received a plurality, but not an absolute majority, in both the June 1977 and March 1979 elections. To exercise power, the UCD had to form parliamentary coalitions with other political parties. From 1979, the government spent much of its time working to hold together the many factions within the party itself, as well as their coalitions. In 1980, the Suárez government had, for the most part, accomplished its goal of a transition to democracy and lacked a further clear agenda. Many UCD members were fairly conservative and did not want further change. For example, a bill to legalize divorce caused much dissension inside the UCD, in spite of being supported by the majority of the populace. The UCD coalition fell apart.

The clashes among the several factions, inside the party, eroded Suárez's authority and his role as leader. The tension exploded in 1981: Suárez resigned as the head of government, and Leopoldo Calvo Sotelo was appointed, first to lead the new cabinet, and later, to the presidency of the UCD; social democrats led by Francisco Fernández Ordóñez defected from the coalition, later joining the PSOE, while Christian democrats left to form the People's Democratic Party.

While the democratic normalization had succeeded in convincing ETA (pm), the "political-military" faction of ETA, to abandon arms and enter parliamentary politics, it did not stop the continuation of terrorist attacks by ETA (m) (ETA Military; later simply ETA) or to a lesser extent, GRAPO. Meanwhile, restlessness in various sections of the armed forces created fear of an impending military coup. Reactionary elements in the army attempted a coup known as 23-F, in which Lieutenant Colonel Antonio Tejero led an occupation by a group of Guardia Civil of the Congress of Deputies, on the afternoon of 23 February 1981. The coup leaders claimed to be acting in the king's name. However, early on the following morning, Juan Carlos gave a nationwide speech unequivocally opposing it, saying that "the Crown, symbol of the permanence and unity of the nation, will not tolerate, in any degree whatsoever, the actions or behavior of anyone attempting, through use of force, to interrupt the democratic process." The coup was broken later that day, but demonstrated the existence of insurrectionary elements within the army.

== First government of Felipe González (1982–1986) ==
Calvo Sotelo dissolved parliament and called for elections in October 1982. In the 1979 election, the UCD had achieved a plurality, but in 1982, it suffered a spectacular defeat with only 11 seats in the Parliament. The 1982 elections gave an absolute majority to the PSOE, which had spent many years preparing its image of an alternative government.

At the 28th Congress of the PSOE in May 1979, secretary-general Felipe González resigned, rather than align himself with the strong revolutionary elements that seemed to dominate the party. A special congress was called that September, and realigned the party along more moderate lines, renouncing Marxism and allowing González to take charge once more. Throughout 1982, the PSOE confirmed its moderate orientation and brought in the social democrats, who had just broken from the UCD.

PSOE won an absolute majority in parliament at two consecutive elections (1982 and 1986) and exactly half the seats in 1989, allowing them to achieve the goals of its political program, "el cambio" ("the change"). At the same time, the PSOE led many local and regional administrations. This comfortable political majority allowed the PSOE to give the country a long period of tranquility and stability, after the intense years of the transition.

Given the cultural affinities, parallels in their recent political history and the influence Francoism had in Chile González's government took a special interest in the incipient Chilean transition to democracy.

== Chronology of key events ==
Date	Event
20 November 1975	Franco dies
22 November 1975	Juan Carlos sworn in as king and head of state; he pardons 9,000 political prisoners. Arias Navarro continues as prime minister.
January–March 1976	Democratic protests include 17,455 strikes, 1672 demonstrations and 283 sit-ins as documented by Interior Ministry
29 May 1976	Right of Assembly Act allows public demonstrations
14 June 1976	Political Associations Act allows political parties
1 July 1976	Suárez appointed prime minister, forms new government and announces his intention to create a modern democracy
19 July 1976	Penal Code reformed to decriminalise the rights of assembly, association, expression of ideas and freedom of work
30 July 1976	Amnesty for some political prisoners (but excludes "crimes of blood")
18 November 1976	Political Reform Act passed, which re-establishes democracy
18 December 1976	Political Reform Act ratified by referendum
4 March 1977	Labour Relations Act legalises right to strike
18 March 1977	Electoral System Act passed
1 April 1977	Trade Union Act legalises the right to organise
9 April 1977	Communist Party legalised
22 April 1977	European Parliament acknowledges Spain's move to democracy
14 May 1977	Don Juan renounces claim to throne
15 June 1977	First free election held in Spain since 1936. They have a mandate to write a new constitution
21 June 1977	Spanish Republican government in exile dissolves itself
15 October 1977	Amnesty Act freed political prisoners, including "crimes of blood" (referring to ETA) and permitted those exiled to return to Spain and guaranteed immunity for those who participated in crimes during the Civil War and in Francoist Spain
29 September 1977	Reestablishment of the Generalitat, the autonomous government of Catalonia, the sole institution of the Second Spanish Republic to be reinstated
25 October 1977	Moncloa Pacts signed
6 December 1978	New constitution ratified by referendum
29 January 1981	Suárez resigns as prime minister
23 February 1981	Attempted coup d’etat known as 23-F
30 May 1982	Spain joins NATO
28 October 1982	Socialist government elected

== See also ==
- Chilean transition to democracy
- Portuguese transition to democracy
- Spanish society after the democratic transition
- Sociological Francoism
- Spanish Republican exiles
- Spanish Republican government in exile
- Government-in-exile of José Giral
- Democracy in Europe
- Metapolitefsi

== Bibliography ==
- Aguilar, Paloma (2009). "The Timing and the Scope of Reparation, Truth and Justice Measures: A Comparison of the Spanish, Argentinian and Chilean Cases". In Ambos, Kai; Large, Judith; Wierda, Marieke (eds.). Building a Future on Peace and Justice: Studies on Transitional Justice. Springer. ISBN 9783540857549.
- Carr, Raymond (1980). Modern Spain, 1875-1980. Oxford University Press. ISBN 9780192158284. OCLC 6555498.
- Casanova, Julián; Gil Andrés, Carlos (2014). Twentieth-century Spain. A History. Translated by Douch, Martin. Cambridge University Press. ISBN 978-1-107-60267-0. OCLC 870438787.
- Colomer, Josep (1995). Game theory and the transition to democracy: the Spanish model. Edward Elgar. ISBN 9781858982014. OCLC 31660123. Archived from the original on 2019-07-12.
- Colomer Rubio, Juan Carlos (2012). "Todo está casi perdonado. A propósito de la Transición, debate historiográfico y propuestas metodológicas" [All is almost forgiven. Regarding the Transition, historiographic debate and methodological proposals] (PDF). Stvdivm. Revista de Humanidades (in Spanish). 18. ISSN 1137-8417.
- Conversi, Daniele (November 2002). "The smooth transition: Spain's 1978 Constitution and the nationalities question" (PDF). National Identities. 4 (3). Carfax Publishing, Inc.: 223–244. Bibcode:2002NatId...4..223C. doi:10.1080/1460894022000026105. ISSN 1460-8944. OCLC 4893678333. S2CID 145731993.
- Edles, L.D.; Seidman, S. (1998). Symbol and Ritual in the New Spain: The Transition to Democracy After Franco. Cambridge Cultural Social Studies. Cambridge University Press. ISBN 978-0-521-62885-3.
- Garland, Gonzalo (2010). Spain: from Transition to modern times (PDF) (Report). Madrid: Instituto de Empresa. Archived from the original (PDF) on 2016-03-03.
- Gil Pecharromán, Julio (2008). Con permiso de la autoridad. La España de Franco (1939–1975) [With Permission from Authority: Franco's Spain (1939–1975)] (in Spanish). Madrid: Temas de Hoy. ISBN 978-84-8460-693-2.
- Gunther, Richard (1993). Politics, society, and democracy. The Case of Spain. Boulder, Co.: Westview Press. ISBN 9780813385457. OCLC 26591531.
- Jiménez Díaz, José Francisco (2016). "Adolfo Suárez González". In Jiménez Díaz, José Francisco; Delgado Fernández, Santiago (eds.). Political Leadership in the Spanish Transition to Democracy (1975–1982). Political Leaders and Their Assessment. New York: Nova Publishers. ISBN 9781634844017. OCLC 936205218.
- Juliá, Santos (1999). Un siglo de España. Política y sociedad [A century of Spain. Politics and society] (in Spanish). Madrid. ISBN 84-9537903-1.
- Ortuño Anaya, Pilar (2005). Los socialistas europeos y la transición española (1959–1977) [European socialists and the Spanish transition (1959–1977)] (in Spanish). Madrid: Marcial Pons. p. 22. ISBN 84-95379-88-0.
- Preston, Paul (2003). Juan Carlos. El Rey de un pueblo [Juan Carlos. The King of a people] (in Spanish). Barcelona: Plaza & Janés. ISBN 84-01-37824-9.
- Ruiz, David (2002). La España democrática (1975–2000). Política y sociedad [Democratic Spain (1975–2000). Politics and society] (in Spanish). Madrid: Síntesis. ISBN 84-9756-015-9.
- Story, Jonathan (1977). "Spanish Political Parties: Before and After the Election" in Government and Opposition (4 ed.). Cambridge University Press. JSTOR 44482173.
- Tusell, Javier (1977). La transición española. La recuperación de las libertades [The Spanish transition. The recovery of liberties] (in Spanish). Madrid: Historia 16 : Temas de Hoy. ISBN 84-7679-327-8. OCLC 37354322.
- Preston, Paul (1986). The Triumph of Democracy in Spain. London: Methuen. ISBN 9780416363500. OCLC 12944839.
- Sánchez-Cuenca, Ignacio; Aguilar, Paloma (2009). "Terrorist Violence and Popular Mobilization: The Case of the Spanish Transition to Democracy". Politics & Society. 37 (3): 428–453. doi:10.1177/0032329209338927. S2CID 154397192.
- Tremlett, Giles (2008). Ghosts of Spain. Travels through Spain and its silent past. Bloomsbury. ISBN 978-0-8027-1674-3.
- Tusell, Javier (2007). Spain: from dictatorship to democracy. 1939 to the present. Oxford: Blackwell. ISBN 9780631206156. OCLC 132299092.
- Historia de un Cambio (in Spanish). Retrieved on August 24, 2006.
