= 1947 Spanish law of succession referendum =

Restoration of the Spanish monarchy

- 6 July 1947
- Do you approve of the Law of Succession to the Headship of the State Bill?

Results
Choice	Votes	%
Yes	14,145,163	95.14%
No	722,656	4.86%
Valid votes	14,867,819	97.69%
Invalid or blank votes	351,744	2.31%
Total votes	15,219,563	100.00%
Registered voters/turnout	17,178,812	88.59%

A referendum on the law of succession was held in Spain on 6 July 1947. The Law of Succession to the Headship of the State (Spanish: Ley de Sucesión en la Jefatura del Estado) was intended to provide for the restoration of the Spanish monarchy. The law appointed Francisco Franco as Head of State for life or until his resignation, but also granted him the power to appoint his successor as King or Regent of the Kingdom and thereby formally established a new Kingdom of Spain.

The question asked was "Do you approve of the Law of Succession to the Headship of the State Bill?" (Spanish: ¿Aprueba el Proyecto de Ley de Sucesión en la Jefatura del Estado?). It was reportedly approved by 95% of valid votes on a turnout of 89%.

== Results ==
Choice	Votes	%
For	14,145,163	95.14
Against	722,656	4.86
Total	14,867,819	100.00
Valid votes	14,867,819	97.69
Invalid/blank votes	351,744	2.31
Total votes	15,219,563	100.00
Registered voters/turnout	17,178,812	88.59
Source: Nohlen & Stöver
