= Political Reform Law =

1977 Spanish law that re-established democracy

Cortes Españolas
- Long title: Law 1/1977, of 4 January, on Political Reform
- Enacted by: 10th Cortes Españolas
- Enacted: 18 November 1976
- Royal assent: 4 January 1977
- Effective: 5 January 1977
- Repealed: 29 December 1978
- Voting summary: 425 voted for; 59 voted against; 13 abstained

Repealed by
- Spanish Constitution of 1978
- Status: Repealed

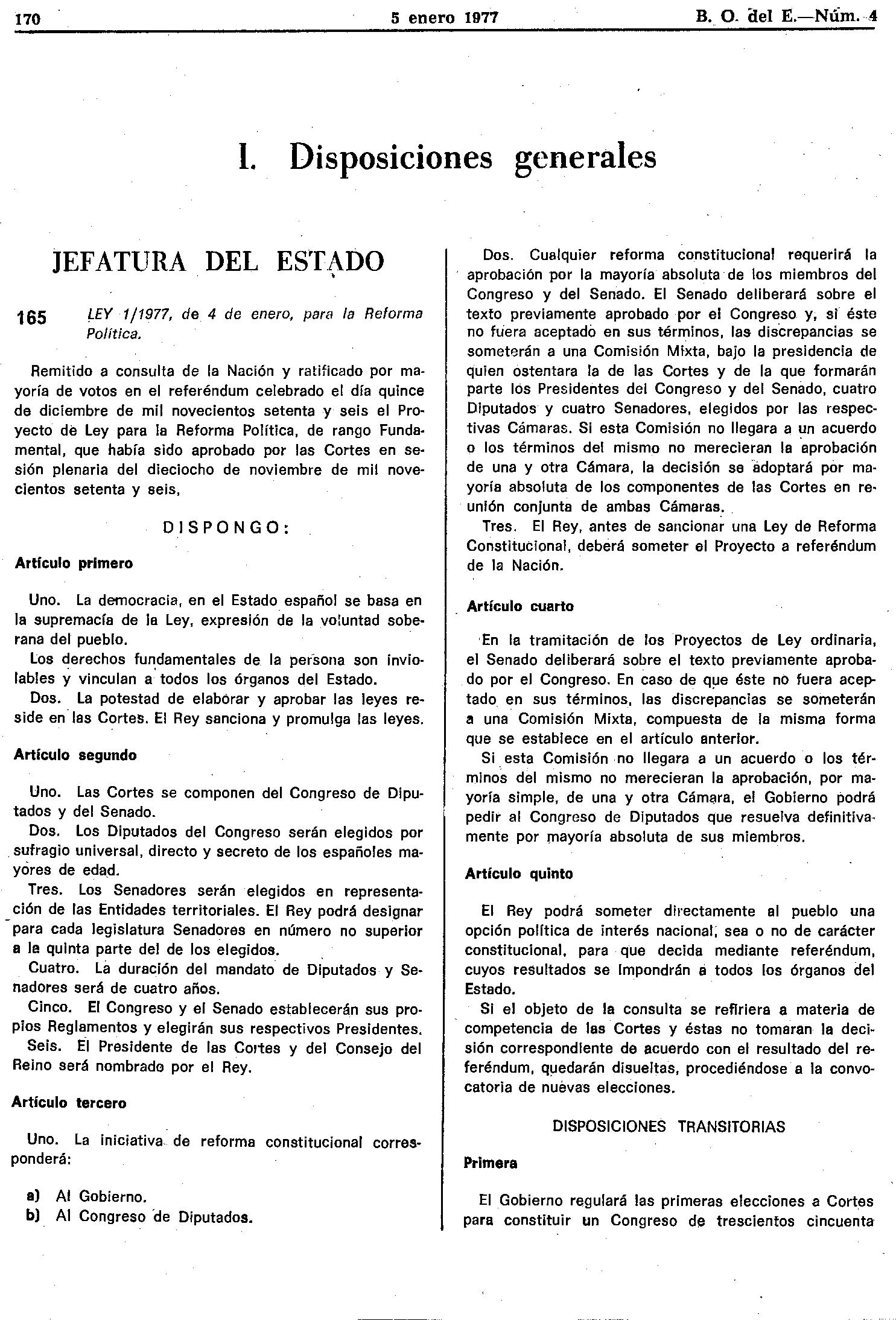
First page of the law in the Official State Gazette of 5 January 1977.

The Political Reform Law (Law 1/1977, of 4 January) was the Spanish law that re-established democracy and allowed the elimination of the governmental structures of the dictatorship of Francisco Franco through a legal process. It is one of the key events in the Spanish Transition.

The Act was passed on 18 November 1976, by the Cortes Españolas and then overwhelmingly approved by referendum one month later. It was the last of the Fundamental Laws of the dictatorship.

Six months later, Spain celebrated its first democratic elections since 1936. After a further six months, a new Spanish Constitution was given royal assent. Two days later, the Political Reform Law was repealed when the Constitution came into force.

== Background ==
On 9 October 1976, seven right-wing political parties who identified with the Francoist regime, formed a coalition named Alianza Popular (AP), to bring together the leading figures of the Francoist regime who were opposed to the reform. Political parties had been legalised by the Political Associations Act of May 1976, enacted during the government of Arias Navarro. Their leaders were Manuel Fraga, Licinio de la Fuente, Federico Silva, Laureano López Rodó, Gonzalo Fernández de la Mora, Enrique Thomas de Carranza and Cruz Martínez Esteruelas.

Alianza Popular considered blocking the Bill in order to force the resignation of Prime Minister Adolfo Suárez. However both the Prime Minister and Speaker Torcuato Fernández-Miranda were prepared to dissolve the Cortes Españolas in the event of opposition to the Bill, since the parliamentary term had expired and would need to be extended.

Finally the Bill was approved by the Council of Ministers, it was submitted to the National Council of the Movement and it was approved on 16 October by 80 votes in favor, 13 against and 6 abstentions. The National Council foresaw its own dissolution:

... This bill, which aims and seeks for the popular majority to become the decision-making body of the reform, can only find a legitimate source and basis by incorporating that majority into the current political order...

== Content ==
The Political Reform Law was the legal instrument that allowed the Spanish Transition to be carried out within the legal system established by General Francisco Franco. This law established a parliamentary monarchy under Juan Carlos I and a two-chamber parliament elected by universal suffrage, and eventually led to a referendum to approve the Constitution of 1978.

The act is divided in five primary articles, three transitory articles (which regulate some legal situations in a provisional way) and a final provision.

- The first two primary articles regulate the form of the state (democracy, popular sovereignty, fundamental rights...), the legislative power, universal suffrage and the role of the King.
- The third and the fourth primary articles regulate the way that the programme of constitutional reforms were to be conducted between the Congress and the Senate.
- The fifth primary article regulates referendums.
- The first transitory article regulates the conduct of elections, the number of deputies and senators and electoral districts.
- The second and the third transitory articles regulate how both legislative chambers are to be constituted and organised, and the rules of conduct of both chambers until the approval of new rules.

A final provision clarifies that the act will have the level of a fundamental law.

== Parliamentary process ==
Since his appointment, prime minister Adolfo Suárez wanted reforms to take place within the existing legal framework through the Francoist Courts, a "democratisation from above" rather than a "democratic break" (i.e. a constituent assembly and provisional government) demanded by opposition forces. Suarez' UCD party sought and achieved approval of the Bill in the Spanish legislature.

The debate was undertaken over two days from the 16th to the 18th of November. The first member (procurador) of parliament to speak to the Bill was Miguel Primo de Rivera and Urquijo along with Fernando Suárez González, the first representative of the lecture. The next day, 17 November, was the turn of the MPs, who gave arguments in favour and against. On the last day, 18 November, was the government response.

One of the most difficult moments was the intervention of Blas Piñar López against the Bill:

“This reform programme is in conflict with the political philosophy of the State (...), this reform, as the Government wants it, and as the bill argues, is a rupture, although the rupture is to be conducted without violence and with legality.”

The Bill was put to the vote at 09:35 PM of 18 November 1976. It had 425 votes in favour, 59 against, and 13 abstentions. The vote and the consequent approval is known as the "harakiri of the Francoist Cortes".

== Referendum ==
The Act, after being passed by parliament, was submitted to referendum on 18 December 1976. The participation was 77,8% of the census and with a 94,17% votes in favor.

== Consequences ==
The approval of this law is seen as the political transformation of the country, turning Spain into a democracy, with a parliamentary monarchy and with the rule of law as one of the fundamental principles of the State.

This law also gives sovereignty to the people and a variety of rights, which would later be developed by the Constitution of 1978. Another principle that this law established is the separation of powers, all of which were previously concentrated in the person of the dictator and are now divided between the government (executive power), the courts (judicial power) and the parliament or Cortes Generales (legislative power).

== See also ==
- Spanish transition to democracy
- Spanish Constitution of 1978
- Politics of Spain
