= 1976 Spanish political reform referendum =

- 15 December 1976
- Do you approve of the Political Reform Bill?

Results
Choice	Votes	%
Yes	16,573,180	97.36%
No	450,102	2.64%
Valid votes	17,023,282	96.73%
Invalid or blank votes	576,280	3.27%
Total votes	17,599,562	100.00%
Registered voters/turnout	22,644,290	77.72%
- Results by autonomous community

A referendum on political reform was held in Spain on Wednesday, 15 December 1976, to gauge support for either the ratification or repeal of the Political Reform Law which had been approved by the Cortes Españolas on 18 November 1976. The question asked was "Do you approve of the Political Reform Bill?" (Spanish: ¿Aprueba el Proyecto de Ley para la Reforma Política?). The referendum resulted in 97.4% of valid votes in support of the bill on a turnout of 77.7%.

== Background ==
The Political Reform Law (Spanish: Ley 1/1977 de 4 de enero) was the last of the Fundamental Laws of the Realm and was approved by the Cortes on 18 November 1976. Its aim was to move away from the dictatorship of the Franco era and turn Spain into a constitutional monarchy with a parliamentary system based on representative democracy. It had been drafted by the President of the Cortes Españolas, Torcuato Fernández-Miranda (including changes that would replace the Cortes Españolas with a Cortes Generales), and supported by Prime Minister Adolfo Suárez and King Juan Carlos. The law provided for the legalisation of political parties and a democratic election to Constituent Cortes, a committee of which then drafted the Constitution.

== Opinion polls ==
The table below lists voting intention estimates in reverse chronological order, showing the most recent first and using the dates when the survey fieldwork was done, as opposed to the date of publication. Where the fieldwork dates are unknown, the date of publication is given instead. The highest percentage figure in each polling survey is displayed with its background shaded in the leading choice's colour. The "Lead" columns on the right show the percentage-point difference between the "Yes" and "No" choices in a given poll.

Polling firm/Commissioner	Fieldwork date	Sample size	Total						Considering only Yes/No totals		
Polling firm/Commissioner	Fieldwork date	Sample size	Yes	No	Invalid/ Blank	X mark	Question	Lead	Yes	No	Lead
1976 referendum	15 Dec 1976	—N/a	73.2	2.0	2.5	22.3	–	71.2	97.4	2.6	94.8
IFOP	29 Nov–6 Dec 1976	1,439	80.0	4.0	16.0	–	–	76.0	95.0	5.0	90.0

== Results ==
=== Overall ===
Question

Do you approve of the Political Reform Bill?

Choice	Votes	%
For	16,573,180	97.36
Against	450,102	2.64
Total	17,023,282	100.00
Valid votes	17,023,282	96.73
Invalid/blank votes	576,280	3.27
Total votes	17,599,562	100.00
Registered voters/turnout	22,644,290	77.72
Source: Ministry of the Interior

=== Results by region ===
Region	Electorate	Turnout	Yes		No	
Region	Electorate	Turnout	Votes	%	Votes	%
Andalusia	3,622,509	81.90	2,840,336	98.16	53,219	1.84
Aragon	798,926	85.32	642,779	97.80	14,464	2.20
Asturias	740,394	73.02	502,438	95.82	21,905	4.18
Balearic Islands	379,205	84.22	303,624	98.21	5,522	1.79
Basque Country	1,277,885	53.86	627,499	96.47	22,956	3.53
Canary Islands	740,781	75.51	537,626	98.34	9,099	1.66
Cantabria	282,506	78.22	198,337	93.05	14,812	6.95
Castile and León	1,687,294	82.52	1,305,391	97.26	36,744	2.74
Castilla–La Mancha	1,052,985	84.71	840,286	96.21	33,058	3.79
Catalonia	3,710,652	74.10	2,567,147	97.79	58,146	2.21
Extremadura	675,902	81.97	532,170	97.96	11,067	2.04
Galicia	1,837,841	69.84	1,225,329	98.04	24,547	1.96
La Rioja	140,606	87.15	133,862	98.30	2,312	1.70
Madrid	2,612,402	78.21	1,883,630	95.91	80,304	4.09
Murcia	540,602	82.41	427,251	97.70	10,046	2.30
Navarre	318,797	73.63	217,879	96.99	6,766	3.01
Valencian Community	2,149,069	85.72	1,745,436	97.58	43,286	2.42
Total	22,644,290	77.72	16,573,180	97.36	450,102	2.64
