= Council of the Realm (Spain) =

Council advising Franco, approved key legislation

- Consejo del Reino
- Coat of Arms
- Formation: 1947
- Dissolved: 1978
- Legal status: Constitutional Body
- Headquarters: Madrid
- Caudillo: Francisco Franco
- King: Juan Carlos I

The Council of the Realm (Spanish: Consejo del Reino) was a corporate organ of Francoist Spain, created by the Law of Succession to the Headship of the State of 1947. Within the institutional complex created to hierarchize the regime of Francisco Franco (the so-called "organic democracy"), was the high council that advised the Head of State in the decision making of its exclusive competence. An antecedent of the Council of the Realm is the institution of the same name that appears in the Draft Constitution of 1929 of the dictatorship of Miguel Primo de Rivera.

== Composition ==
Permanent councilors:

- the active officers of greater seniority from the Army, Navy and Air Force, by the same order.
- the Chief of the Defence High Command (the General Staff).
- the Roman Catholic prelate of greater hierarchy and seniority among those who were procurators in the Cortes Españolas.
- the President of the Council of State.
- the President of the Supreme Court.
- the President of the Institute of Spain.

Elective councilors, elected by vote by groups of procurators in the Cortes Españolas:

- two councilors for the Local Administration Group.
- two councilors for the National Councilors Group.
- two councilors for the Family Representation Group.
- two councilors for the Trade Union Organization Group.
- one councilor for the University Rectors Group.
- one councilor for the Professional Association Group.

The President of the Council of the Realm was the President of the Cortes, and was appointed by the Head of State from a list of three names presented by the Council of the Realm.

== Functions ==
The function of the Council of the Realm was to provide the Head of State with a list of three names to elect a President of the Government from among them. Likewise, the Head of State needed the Council of the Realm to dissolve or extend the legislatures of the Cortes Españolas, dismiss the President of the Government, as well as many other functions.

== Presidents ==
- 1947–1965: Esteban de Bilbao Eguía
- 1965–1969: Antonio Iturmendi Bañales
- 1969–1975: Alejandro Rodríguez de Valcárcel
  - Vice President: Joaquín Bau Nolla. As President of the Council of State (since 1965) Bau was councilor of the Realm.
- 1975–1977: Torcuato Fernández-Miranda
- 1977–1978: Antonio Hernández Gil (president of the democratic Cortes).

== Trajectory ==
During the life of Francisco Franco, the Council of the Realm was a pure formalism, because the only will was that of the Head of State.

With the accession of the King Juan Carlos I to the throne, the Council of the Realm facilitated the appointment of Adolfo Suárez as President of the Government, although also some councilors showed very reactionary positions to the Political Reform Law of 1977.

The democratic Cortes specified that this body would be dissolved after the promulgation of the Spanish Constitution of 1978.
