= Organic Law of the State =

Spanish constitution approved in 1966

The Organic Law of the State (Spanish: Ley Orgánica del Estado) (Law 1/1967, of 11 January, for the Organic Law of the State) was promulgated during the third stage of the Francoist regime in Spain, by a government in which most of the power was in the hands of technocrats. Together with the other seven Fundamental Laws of the Realm, the process of institutionalization of the Francoist regime was achieved. The law was approved by a referendum on 14 December 1966, with the favorable vote of 98.1% of the voters.

== Content ==
The law was structured in sixty-six articles distributed in ten titles:

- Title I. The National State. It includes national sovereignty and the fundamental aims of the State: the defense of the unity of men; the integrity, independence and security of the Nation; the safeguarding of the spiritual and material heritage of the Spaniards; the protection of the rights of the person, of the family and of society; and the promotion of a just social order. It also regulates the national flag. Among the rights stand out those of association, religious freedom and the possibility of creating political associations.
- Title II. The Head of State. It makes the Head of State as the representative of the Nation. His status and inviolability are recognized. He will be assisted and be advised, by the Council of the Kingdom and will be empowered to call for a referendum, and concentrates in making major policy decisions and in ensuring the overall integrity of the state and serves as the commander-in-chief of the armed forces and the chief representative of Spain in diplomatic relations and is the leader of the Movimiento Nacional, the ruling coalition supporting the fascist dictatorship and the right to legislate by decree. He will designate the "heir of the Crown", without specifying who this should be.

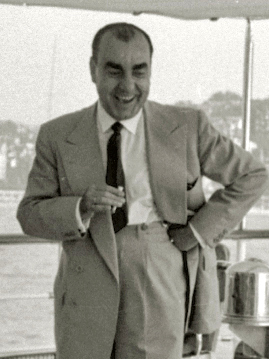
Luis Carrero Blanco (pictured in 1963), the first President of the Government appointed according to the provisions of the Organic Law of the State.

- Title III. The Government of the Nation. Separates the positions of Head of State and President of the Government. The latter will be appointed for a term of five years by the Head of State from a list of three candidates proposed by the Council of the Kingdom. The Head of State appoints and dismiss the ministers, upon the proposal of the President of the Government. The President of the Government facilitates the carrying out of major policy decisions and runs the day-to-day government. The Council of Ministers, or the Cabinet helps him or her in implementing the major policy decisions. This system was fully implemented in 1973, when Franco appointed as President of the Government Luis Carrero Blanco (who was assassinated by ETA after several months in office, and was replaced by Carlos Arias Navarro).
- Title IV. The National Council. Called Cortes Españolas, it exercises legislative power. It has a complex election system, with ex officio members (among them university rectors), members appointed by the Head of State and members elected by the community, representing the Family, Local Corporations and the Trade Union Organization. In particular, there were 102 procurators elected by the third of the family, something that was already foreseen in the Law Constituting the Cortes of 1942, but those until that moment had not been elected.
- Title V. The Justice. It includes the independence of Justice and the gratuity for those who lack resources. The jurisdictional orders are ordinary (Civil, Criminal, Contentious-Administrative and Labor) and special (Military and Ecclesiastical).
- Title VI. The Armed Forces. It integrates the three branches of the Spanish Armed Forces (Army, Navy and Air Force) and law enforcement agencies (namely, General Police Corps and Armed Police Corps; see es:Policía franquista). The three branches of the Armed Forces have a General Staff, coordinated through the Defence High Command. The National Defense Board proposes to the Government the policies concerning national security and defense.
- Title VII. The Administration of the State. It includes the principle of legality, provides for an administrative procedure with recourse and the submission to judicial control of the contentious-administrative jurisdiction. It includes the National Economy Council and the Court of Accounts.
- Title VIII. The Local Administration. It includes the municipalities and provinces and foresees that the State promotes the development of municipal and provincial life, protects and promotes the patrimony of the local Corporations and assures to them the economic means necessary for the fulfillment of their purposes.
- Title IX. Relations between the High Organs of the State. It regulates the relations between legislative and executive powers.
- Title X. The Resource of Repeal. It regulates the repeal process against legislative acts or general provisions of the Government that violate the Principles of the National Movement or the other Fundamental Laws of the Realm.

== See also ==
- List of constitutions of Spain
- Fundamental Laws of the Realm
