= Francisco José Alcaraz =

Spanish politician and activist

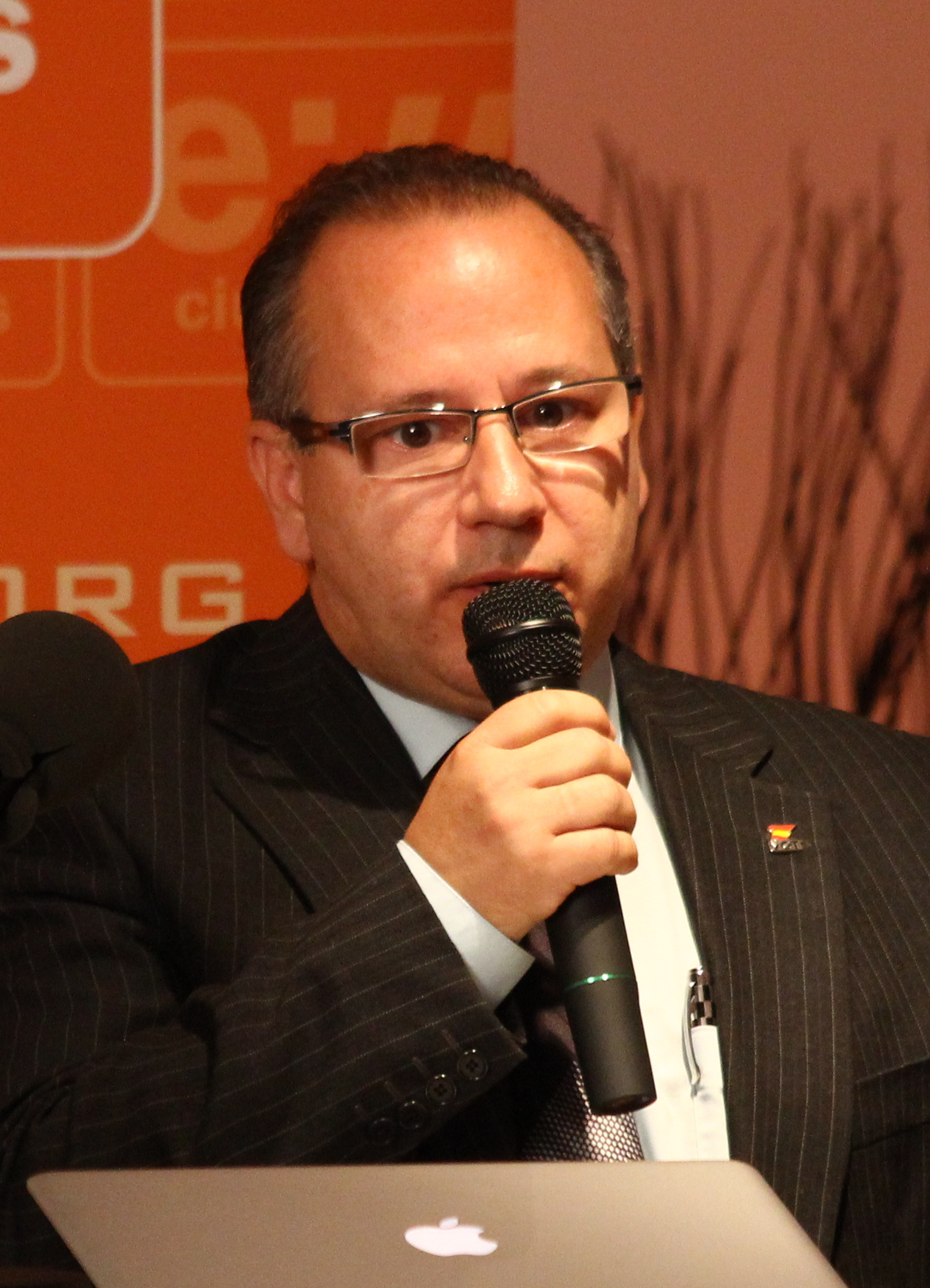
- Alcaraz in an event organized by HazteOir.org in 2011

Senator of Spain
- Incumbent
- Assumed office 19 February 2019
- Appointed by: Parliament of Andalusia

President of Voices Against Terrorism
- In office 2004–2008
- Preceded by: Luis Portero de la Torre
- Succeeded by: Juan Antonio García Casquero

Personal details
- Born: Francisco José Alcaraz Martos; 1 November 1968 (age 56); Torredonjimeno, Jaén, Spain
- Political party: Vox

Francisco José Alcaraz Martos (born 1 November 1968) is a Spanish politician, member of the Vox party, and activist. He's served as president and spokesman for the Asociación de Víctimas del Terrorismo (AVT, "Association of Victims of Terrorism") between 2004 and 2008. He is also the founder and president of the association Voces contra el Terrorismo (VcT, "Voices Against Terrorism").

== Career ==
Francisco José Alcaraz was a Hairdresser by profession. When he was 19 years old (on 11 December 1987) his brother and two three-year-old nieces were killed by the explosion of an ETA car bomb placed in the barracks of the Civil Guard in Zaragoza. Before joining the AVT, he did it to the Asociación de Víctimas del Terrorismo "Esperanza Verde" ("Association of Victims of Terrorism 'Green Hope'"). Later he joined the AVT, where he held various positions until reaching the position of president. He was one of the leading promoters of the conspiracy theories vis-à-vis the authorship of the 11-M train bombings.

On 13 May 2006 he was reelected president of the association with 86% of the votes cast, after the withdrawal of the candidacy of Pablo Broseta, son of Manuel Broseta, in the elections to the Board of Directors of the AVT. On 6 March 2008, he announced his retirement as president of the association by April of that year, alleging "personal reasons". In July 2009 he left militancy in the AVT after a harsh confrontation with the succeeding leadership, and after criticizing the widow of the last victim of ETA, Eduardo Puelles, accusing her of having fallen "in the language of nationalists and terrorists".

In 2010 seven associations of victims accused Alcaraz of breaking the unity against ETA for calling a demonstration against the government's policy on incarcerated ETA members which he considered too soft – a call with which they did not agree. In spite of this, tens of thousands of people attended the event summoned alone by the platform presided over by Alcaraz.

He is currently the president of the Voces contra el Terrorismo ("Voices Against Terrorism") platform, of which he was founder.

=== Senator ===
On 31 January 2019, it was announced that Alcaraz would be appointed Senator by regional designation by the Vox party, following the results of the 2018 Andalusian regional election. He officially took office on February 19 as a member of the Mixed Group (Grupo mixto), of which Bildu is also a member. He left office after nine months. He was elected deputy for Vox in the Congress for Jaén in November 2019.

== Personal life ==
Born into a Catholic family, Alcaraz became an active Jehovah's Witness in the 1980s (avoiding conscription on the basis of those beliefs) before joining Evangelical Christianity, a group that he too later distanced himself from.
