= Controversies about the 2004 Madrid train bombings =

Controversies surrounding 2004 Madrid train bombing

The controversy regarding the handling and representation of the Madrid train bombings by the government arose with Spain's two main political parties, Spanish Socialist Workers' Party (PSOE) and Partido Popular (PP), accusing each other of concealing or distorting evidence for electoral reasons.

== Events ==
The bombings occurred three days before general elections, in which incumbent José María Aznar's PP was defeated. Immediately after the bombing, leaders of the PP claimed evidence indicated that the Basque separatist organization ETA was responsible for the bombings. Such accusation led to a result which favours to the PP's chances of being re-elected. The PP government involved Spain in the Iraq War, a policy very unpopular with many Spaniards. Therefore, if a link between the bombings and the Iraq War involvement were established, it could have reduced the popularity of the PP.

Nationwide demonstrations and protests followed the attacks. A view amongst several political commentators is that the PP lost the election as a result of the handling and presentation of the terrorist attacks, rather than specifically due to the Madrid train bombings. A 2011 study by Jose Montalvo published in The Review of Economics and Statistics reached the conclusion that terrorist attack had important electoral consequences (turning the electoral outcome against the incumbent People's Party and handing government over to the Socialist Party (PSOE)).

After 21 months of investigation, judge Juan del Olmo ruled Moroccan national Jamal Zougam guilty of physically carrying out the attack. The September 2007 sentence established no known mastermind nor direct al-Qaeda link.

== Accuracy of government statements ==
The conservative PP government was accused of falsely blaming ETA for the attacks. The day of the attacks, police officials informed the Government that explosives usually used by ETA were found at the blast sites. This, along with other suspicious circumstances, led the PP to suspect ETA involvement. Although there was no direct or indirect evidence from the investigation of the bombing pointing to ETA involvement, the group had been caught with a large amount of explosives some months previously, which looked like preparations for a big strike. According to a report of the European Strategic Intelligence and Security Center (ESISC), the same morning of the bombings the Spanish Intelligence Services and Policy had concluded that the author of the massacre was an Islamist terrorist group, but they had been ordered by the government to deny this Islamist attribution and insist that the ETA were the only suspects, although this same source also states that there is no precedent of collaboration of international Islamists with non-Muslims, and there were two non-Muslims (and police informers) involved in the Madrid attacks.

The government sent messages to all Spanish embassies abroad ordering that they uphold the version that ETA was responsible. Prime Minister José María Aznar even called a number of newspaper editors and publishers personally to ask for their support for this version.

The tense political atmosphere in Spain in the period running up to the elections brought the PP to the edge of a political catastrophe. On one hand, José María Aznar was aggressively opposed to any dialogue with ETA, and based most of his campaign on the threat of terrorism (the September 11 attacks in New York reinforced his view of the war against the terrorists). On the other hand, Aznar's friendship with U.S. president George W. Bush led him to support the 2003 invasion of Iraq against the views of the overwhelming majority of the population (resulting in the biggest demonstrations ever seen in Spain since the restoration of democracy in the late 1970s). This left Aznar in a complicated situation: if Basque terrorists were proven to be responsible for the massacre, it would favour the PP's campaign, but if an Islamic group appeared to cause the blast, people might blame him for earning himself (and Spain) enemies.

The Summary of the Judicial Enquiry concluded that the decision to attack Madrid was taken after, and as a result of, the invasion of Iraq. Nevertheless, The New Yorker claimed the decision was taken before 9/11 according to an Italian police report.

== Explosives used in the attacks ==
In the immediate aftermath of the train bombings it was suspected that the explosive used in the bombs may have been Titadine, as initial suspicions on responsibility for the bombings focused on ETA and this explosive had been used by them on occasions in the past. As evidence emerged from the investigation attention on the explosive used switched to a brand of dynamite known as Goma-2.

Analysis of samples from the explosion sites carried out by a member of the bomb disposal squad (TEDAX) following the bombings did not produce a definitive result. The analyst concerned later testified in the trial of those accused of committing the bombings. She stated that the only thing she could identify in these tests were generic components of dynamite.

Later in 2004, in his appearance before the parliamentary committee of inquiry, Juan Jesus Sánchez Manzano (the head of the TEDAX) stated that traces of nitroglycerine had been detected in the samples recovered after the bombings. He would later retract this statement before the investigating magistrate in charge of the case and emphasised that he was not an expert in explosives. The statement by Sánchez Manzano led supporters of the idea that ETA was involved in the bombings to question whether the explosive used in the bombs had been Goma 2 ECO. Nitroglycerine is not a component of Goma 2 ECO.

In the run up to the trial of those accused, the court ordered that fresh tests be carried out on the samples recovered from the trains and on remains of explosive recovered from different sites connected to the bombings. These tests were carried out by specialists appointed from the security services, the defence and other parties to the accusation. The judges ordered that video and audio recordings be made of these tests. The results of these tests were also inconclusive concerning the samples taken from the explosion sites. Nitroglycerine was detected in one of these samples, and the presence of dinitrotoluene (DNT) was also detected. This has led to claims that the explosive used could have been Titadine. However, also detected in the same sample was dibutyl phthalate (DBP), which is a component of Goma 2 ECO but not of titadine. Several other samples from the explosion sites also revealed the joint presence of DNT and DBP. Tests were carried out on a sample of Titadine. In addition the presence of nitroglycerine and DNT was also detected in samples of Goma 2 ECO that had been recovered from sites associated with the bombings.

The discovery of these different components led to suggestions that there could have been some accidental contamination of the samples and explosive remains, although a definitive cause of such contamination has not been established. Entire cartridges, or partial remains of cartridges, of Goma 2 ECO were recovered from the apartment in Leganés where 7 suspects of the bombings died following an explosion, the only unexploded bomb, a Renault Kangoo van found near Alcalá de Henares station on the day of the bombings, and the device that was left by the high speed railway line connecting Madrid and Seville.

The only explosive positively identified in any site connected to the bombings has been Goma 2 ECO and the sentence in the trial concluded that it was likely that the bombs contained this explosive or a mixture of it with its predecessor product Goma 2 EC.

== Potential prevention of the bombings ==
Some of the alleged Islamist perpetrators had reportedly been under surveillance by the Spanish police since January 2003. According to the Spanish newspaper El Mundo, 24 of the 29 alleged perpetrators were informers and/or controlled by the Cuerpo Nacional de Policía, Civil Guard and Centro Nacional de Inteligencia ("National Centre for Intelligence") from the time before the attacks. Two alleged perpetrators were Guardia Civil and Spanish police informants. Cell phones used in the bombings were unlocked in a shop owned by a former Spanish policeman who is not one of those accused in connection with the bombings.

Two of those accused of supplying explosives for the bombings have a conviction for a previous 2001 offence of trafficking with Goma-2 ECO, an offence that did not prevent Trashorras, described as "necessarily involved co-operator" from later getting a job in a mine, thus gaining access to explosives and blast equipment.

== Controversy regarding responsibility ==
Thirteen improvised explosive devices were reported to have been used by the Islamic militant group that was responsible for the bombing, all but three of which detonated. This group seems to have had very tenuous connection with al-Qaeda but with the aim of acting on its behalf. Shortly after the bombings, the group was completely dismantled by the Spanish police and the core members died in an apparent suicide explosion when they were surrounded in the nearby town of Leganés.

The Madrid bombings have led to the sharp political and social differences between the parties in Spain being accentuated. This stands in sharp contrast to other large-scale terrorist attacks such as those in New York and London, which galvanized society and political forces towards unity.

Spain's political division is exemplified by the accusation of members of the Partido Popular and several conservative media outlets regarding who was responsible for the bombings and whether the attacks were for political gain. Some of these sources initially supported the hypothesis that ETA was behind the attacks. These groups have focused their investigation on unexplained details and inconsistencies in the Summary Report and have expressed skepticism about the truthfulness and neutrality of the evidence presented.

Since the bombings, the chief opposition party, PP (which lost power in the election in the immediate aftermath of the bombings), together with conservative media in Spain, have overtly argued the possibility that the Socialist party, the police, the Spanish, French, and Moroccan secret services, and, of course, ETA, had a role in organisation of the outrage. Not all conservative media outlets were involved in this campaign. There is a distinct difference between those who believe that the Spanish Socialist Workers' Party (PSOE) used it for political gain (as it had access to information, either from France or through links to the Police, used to criticise the government in the aftermath of the bombings), and those who believe a consortium of the ETA, some groups in the State Security Forces (possibly related to the Grupos Antiterroristas de Liberación (GAL)), the Moroccan secret services, and the PSOE may have had a role either in organising the bombings or blocking official investigation. The first group includes the Newspaper ABC, while the second group includes the Radio Station COPE and newspapers La Razón and El Mundo. This second group claims the official version is more than questionable and that the truth is still unknown. They have coupled such claims with doubts about the legitimacy of the current government, which they oppose ideologically.

An attempt to link ETA to the bombings occurred in May 2006, when El Mundo published on its front page that a business card of the Basque firm Mondragón Cooperative Corporation (MCC) had been found in the van used by the terrorists. This piece of evidence, discovered by the policemen who found the van, was not found in the numerous police reports. El Mundo's rationale was that Mondragón had no connection with ETA but could point to ETA, just as the Qur'anic cassette pointed to Islamic extremists.

The Spanish police later asserted that it was not a business card, but the cover of a music CD of the popular Spanish 1980s rock group Orquesta Mondragón. The CD with its case was found in a pile of various other music CDs. The rear of the cover had apparently been used by the legitimate proprietor to warn people when he parked in the middle of the street, since it had a handwritten message that read "I am coming back immediately". Nevertheless, El Mundo continued to insist on the existence of an MCC card in the van.

The Spanish police also asserted that a card from "Gráficas Bilbaínas" ("Bilbao printing", a print shop located in Madrid) found in the van was the source of the alleged confusion.

== Alleged destruction of evidence ==
The passenger cars damaged by the explosions were supposedly destroyed to hide evidence 4 days after the explosion and the corpses found in the Leganés flat were also supposedly buried without autopsy. Additionally, in December 2004, José Luis Rodríguez Zapatero claimed that the PP government erased all of the computer files related to the Madrid bombings, leaving only the documents on paper.

== Maussili Kalaji ==
Mobile phones used in the bombings were unlocked in a shop owned by a Spanish policeman (who retired after the attacks) of Syrian descent and former al Fatah militant, Maussili Kalaji. Kalaji was not one of those accused in connection with the bombings, though the police proposed to take him into custody.

== The thirteenth bomb ==
Clues from the thirteenth bomb allowed the police to arrest the first alleged perpetrators, three Moroccans (Jamal Zougam, Mohamed Chaoui and Mohamed Bekkaliand) and two Indian citizens, on Saturday, 13 March. The bomb has been called "the bomb that dismounted the PP version of ETA", and was known to Spanish sources as "Mochila de Vallecas", "Backpack from Vallecas", because its discovery was announced in the Vallecas Police Station on the morning of 12 March. The thirteenth bomb's validity as an exhibit is disputed.

=== Presence of the bomb on the train ===
On the morning of the bombings, the trains were double-checked by the EOD police to be sure that no unexploded devices were present. The thirteenth bomb was not found at this time. The only EOD policeman who remembered handling a heavy bag (the thirteenth bomb weighed around 11 kilograms (24 lbs)) that morning in El Pozo station asserted positively that the heavy bag he handled in the train station did not contain the bomb.

=== Correct handling of the evidence ===
A Spanish police report concluded that the bomb could have been manipulated by unidentified persons in Ifema (in Spanish, "pudo ser manipulada por personas no identificadas en el Ifema"), which was the Madrid exhibition center where objects found in the trains were temporarily stored. While DNA from an unidentified male was found on or in the bag, Spanish police asserted that the 'chain of custody' was unbroken and the PP leader, Mariano Rajoy, asserted in March 2006 that he had no doubts about the validity of this police exhibit.

In December 2006 El Mundo claimed that one of the policeman in the Vallecas Police Station during the alleged discovery of the thirteenth bomb was under investigation for his alleged participation in a plot to sell illegal Goma 2-ECO, and in the assassination of a petty thief.

== See also ==
- Bologna massacre
- Conspiracy theory
