= El Pozo railway station =

Railway station in Madrid, Spain

El Pozo
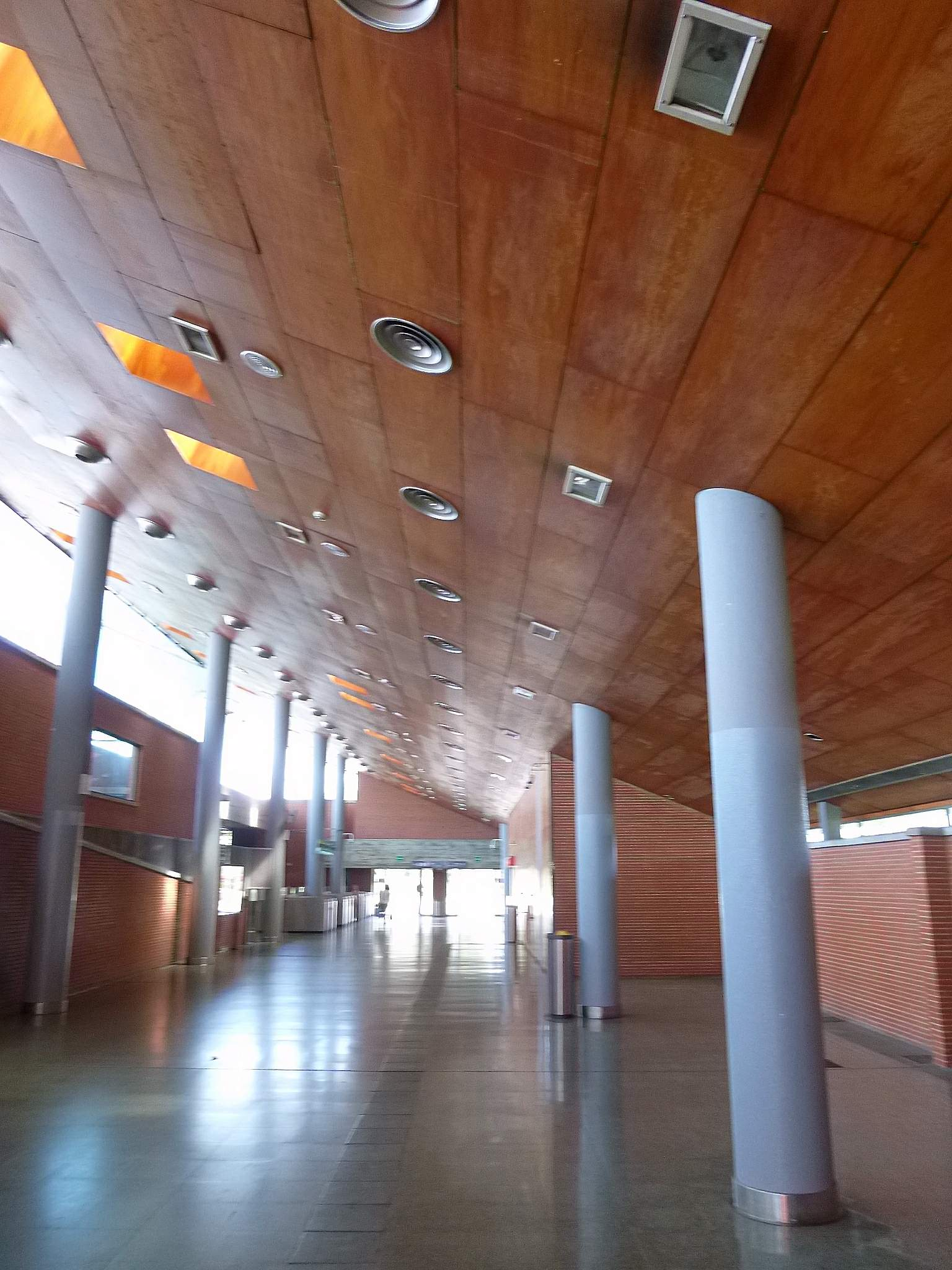

General information
- Location: Centro, Madrid; Spain
- Coordinates: 40°26′48″N 3°41′32″W
- Platforms: 2

Construction
- Structure type: At Grade
- Platform levels: 2

Other information
- Fare zone: A

History
- Opened: July 15, 1992

Services
Preceding station	Cercanías Madrid	Following station
Asamblea de Madrid Entrevías towards Chamartín	C-2	Vallecas towards Guadalajara
Asamblea de Madrid Entrevías towards Príncipe Pío	C-7	Vallecas towards Alcalá de Henares
Location

El Pozo Station is a Cercanías station in Vallecas neighborhood (Madrid). It was opened on July 15, 1992, and it is located in El Pozo area. It belongs to lines C-2 and C-7 of Cercanías Madrid.

On the morning of March 11, 2004, a double-decker commuter train exploded with two bombs at this station, thus killing 68 people. It was later discovered that the Islamic terrorist cell Al-Qaeda was behind the attack. In 2011, a monument made by the architect José María Pérez González with the collaboration of several Spanish artists, including Juan Genovés, Forges, and Andrés Rábago García, was inaugurated near the station in memory of those who died in the attacks of March 2004.

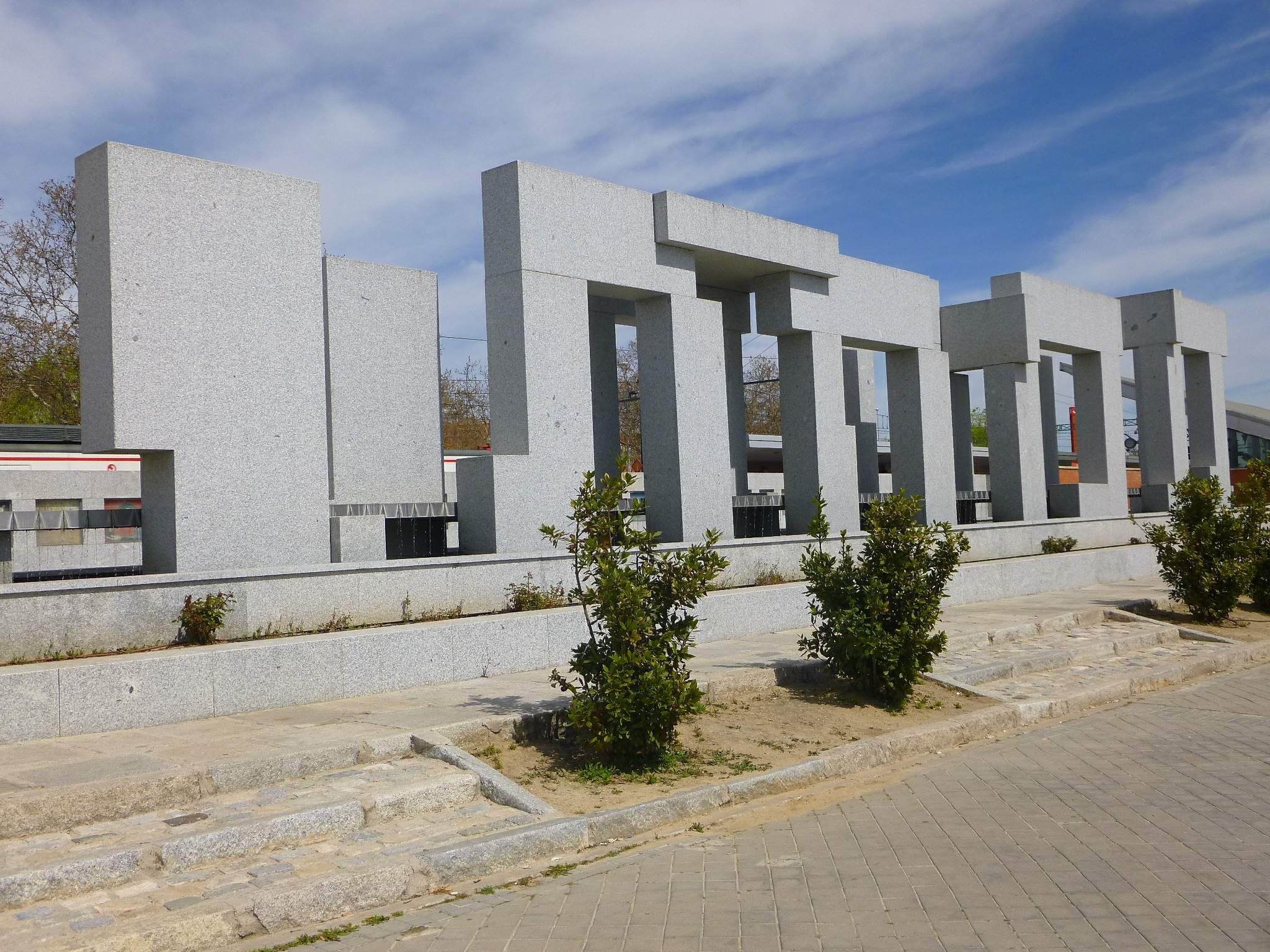
Monument to the victims of the 2004 terrorist attack
