= 2004 Madrid train bombings =

Terrorist attack on Madrid's suburban trains

Coordinates: 40°24′24″N 3°41′22″W

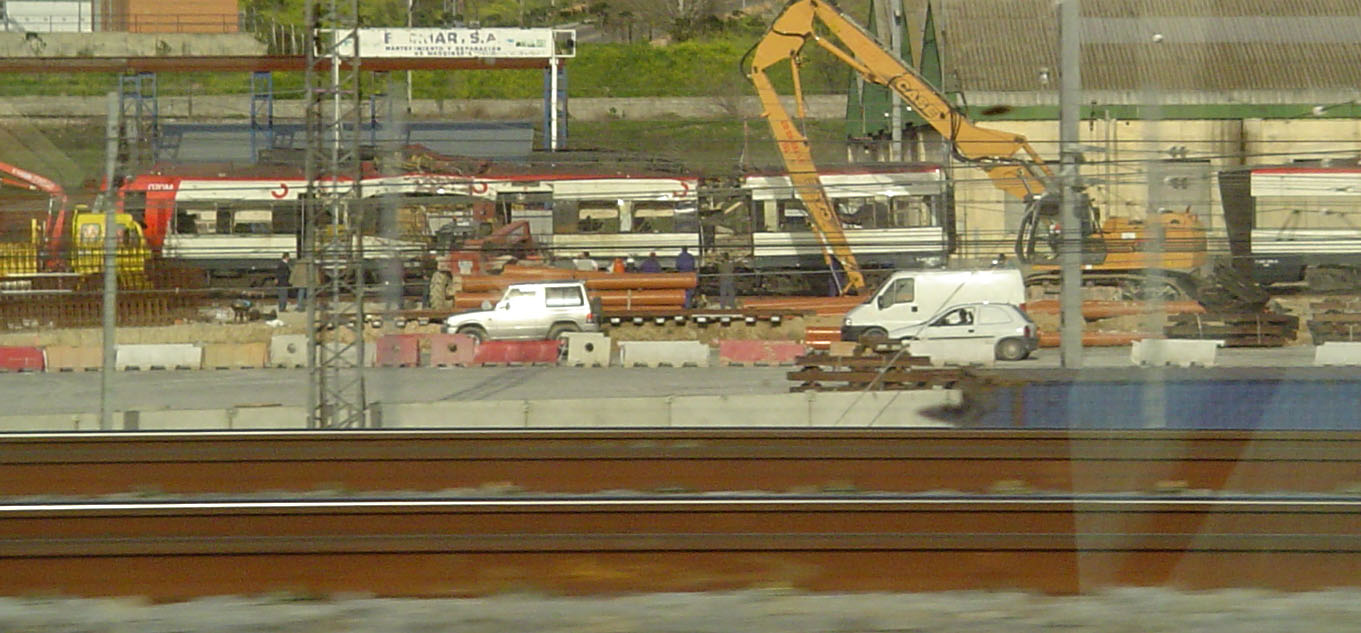
- Remains of one train near Atocha station
- Location: Madrid, Spain
- Date: 11 March 2004; 22 years ago 08:37 – 08:40 CET (UTC+01:00)
- Target: Madrid commuter rail network, civilians
- Attack type: Mass murder, time bombing, terrorism
- Weapon: Backpacks filled with Goma-2 explosives
- Deaths: 193
- Injuries: 2,500+
- Perpetrators: Radical Islamists – Jamal Zougam and five other individuals
- No. of participants: 6 individuals
- Motive: Opposition to Spanish participation in the Iraq and Afghanistan Wars

The 2004 Madrid train bombings (also known in Spain as 11M for 11 de marzo) (or 3/11) were a series of coordinated, nearly simultaneous bombings against the Cercanías commuter train system of Madrid, Spain, on the morning of 11 March 2004—three days before Spain's general elections. The explosions killed 193 people and injured around 2,500. The bombings constituted the deadliest terrorist attack carried out in the history of Spain and the deadliest in Europe since the 1988 bombing of Pan Am Flight 103 in Scotland. The attacks were carried out by radical Islamists who opposed Spanish indirect involvement in the 2003 US-led invasion of Iraq.

Controversy regarding the handling and representation of the bombings by the government arose, with Spain's two main political parties — the Spanish Socialist Workers' Party (PSOE) and the Partido Popular (PP) — accusing each other of concealing or distorting evidence for electoral reasons. The bombings occurred three days before general elections in which incumbent Prime Minister José María Aznar's PP was defeated. Immediately after the bombing, leaders of the PP claimed evidence indicating the Basque separatist organization ETA (Euskadi Ta Askatasuna) was responsible for the bombings, while the opposition claimed that the PP was trying to prevent the public from knowing it had been an Islamist attack, which would be interpreted as the direct result of Spain's involvement in Iraq, an unpopular war which the government had entered without the approval of the Spanish Parliament. The scale and precise planning of the attacks reared memories of the September 11 attacks.

Following the attacks, there were nationwide demonstrations and protests demanding that the government "tell the truth." The prevailing opinion of political analysts is that the Aznar administration lost the general elections as a result of the handling and representation of the terrorist attacks, rather than because of the bombings per se. Results published in The Review of Economics and Statistics by economist José García Montalvo seem to suggest that indeed the bombings had important electoral impact (turning the electoral outcome against the incumbent People's Party and handing government over to the Socialist Party, PSOE).

After 21 months of investigation, judge Juan del Olmo tried Moroccan national Jamal Zougam, among several others, for his participation carrying out the attack. Although claims were made that attacks were linked to al-Qaeda, investigations and probes conducted by Spanish officials did not find any links to al-Qaeda. Findings issued by the Spanish judiciary in September 2007 found 21 individuals guilty of participating in the attacks, while rejecting the involvement of an external mastermind or direct al-Qaeda links.

== Description ==
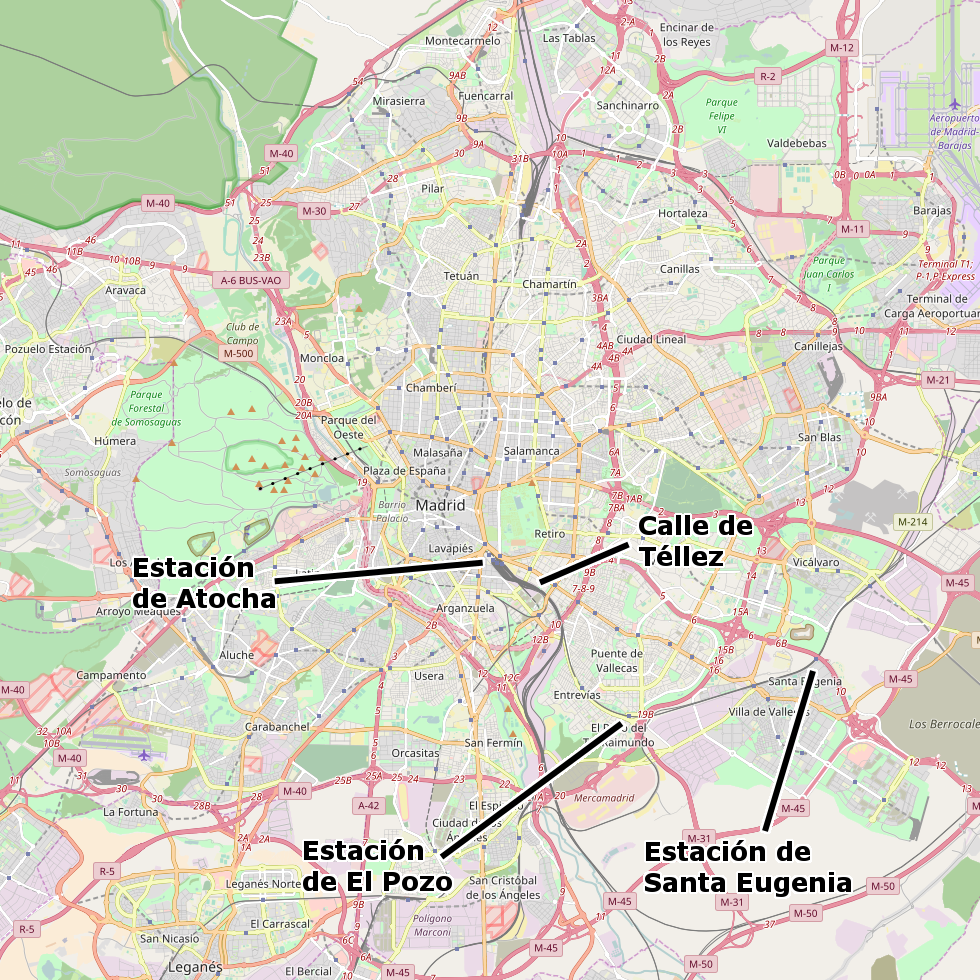
Bombings map

During the peak of Madrid rush hour on the morning of Thursday, 11 March 2004, ten explosions occurred aboard four commuter trains (cercanías). The date, 11 March, led to the abbreviation of the incident as "11-M". All the affected trains were traveling on the same line and in the same direction between Alcalá de Henares and the Atocha station in Madrid. It was later reported that thirteen improvised explosive devices (IEDs) had been placed on the trains. Bomb disposal teams (TEDAX) arriving at the scenes of the explosions detonated two of the remaining three IEDs in controlled explosions, but the third was not found until later in the evening, having been stored inadvertently with luggage taken from one of the trains. The following timeline of events comes from the judicial investigation.

All four trains had departed the Alcalá de Henares station between 07:01 and 07:14. The explosions took place between 07:37 and 07:40, as described below (all times given are in local time CET, UTC +1):

- Atocha Station (train number 21431) – Three bombs exploded. Based on the video recording from the station security system, the first bomb exploded at 07:37, and two others exploded within 4 seconds of each other at 07:38. The train cars affected were the sixth, fifth and fourth. A fourth device was found by the TEDAX team two hours later in the first car, which was scheduled to explode when emergency services arrived. Two hours after the first explosions, the bomb was detonated by the bomb disposal team in the first car in a controlled manner.
- El Pozo del Tío Raimundo Station (train number 21435) – At approximately 07:38, just as the train (six cars and double-decker) was starting to leave the station, two bombs exploded in different carriages. The carriages affected were the fourth and fifth. Another bomb was found in the third wagon and was detonated hours later by the TEDAX team on the platform, slightly damaging the third wagon. Yet another bomb was found in the second carriage; it was disabled hours later in the nearby Parque Azorín, and allowed the police to find several suspects.
- Santa Eugenia Station (train number 21713) – One bomb exploded at approximately 07:38. The only wagon affected was the fourth.
- Calle Téllez (train number 17305), approximately 800 meters from Atocha Station – Four bombs exploded in different carriages of the train at approximately 07:39. The wagons affected were the first, the fourth, the fifth and sixth. The train was slowing down to stop and wait for train 21431 to vacate platform 2 in Atocha.

At 08:00, emergency relief workers began arriving at the scenes of the bombings. The police reported numerous victims and mentioned 50 wounded and several dead. By 08:30 the emergency ambulance service, SAMUR (Servicio de Asistencia Municipal de Urgencia y Rescate), had set up a field hospital at the Daoiz y Velarde sports facility. Bystanders and local residents helped relief workers, as hospitals were told to expect the arrival of many casualties. At 08:43, firefighters reported 15 dead at El Pozo. By 09:00, the police had confirmed the death of at least 30 people – 20 at El Pozo and about 10 in Santa Eugenia and Atocha. People combed the city's major hospitals in search of family members who they thought were aboard the trains. There were 193 confirmed dead victims, the last victim dying in 2014 after having been in a coma for 10 years due to one of the Atocha explosions and not having been able to recover from their injuries.

Citizenships of the victims
Citizenship	Victims
Spain	143
Romania	16
Ecuador	6
Bulgaria	4
Peru	4
Poland	4
Colombia	2
Dominican Republic	2
Honduras	2
Morocco	2
Ukraine	2
France	1
Brazil	1
Chile	1
Cuba	1
Philippines	1
Senegal	1
Total	193

The total number of victims was higher than in any other terrorist attack in Spain, far surpassing the 21 killed and 40 wounded from a 1987 bombing at a Hipercor chain supermarket in Barcelona. On that occasion, responsibility was claimed by ETA. It was Europe's worst terror attack since the bombing of Pan Am Flight 103 over Lockerbie, Scotland on 21 December 1988.

== Further bombings spur investigation ==
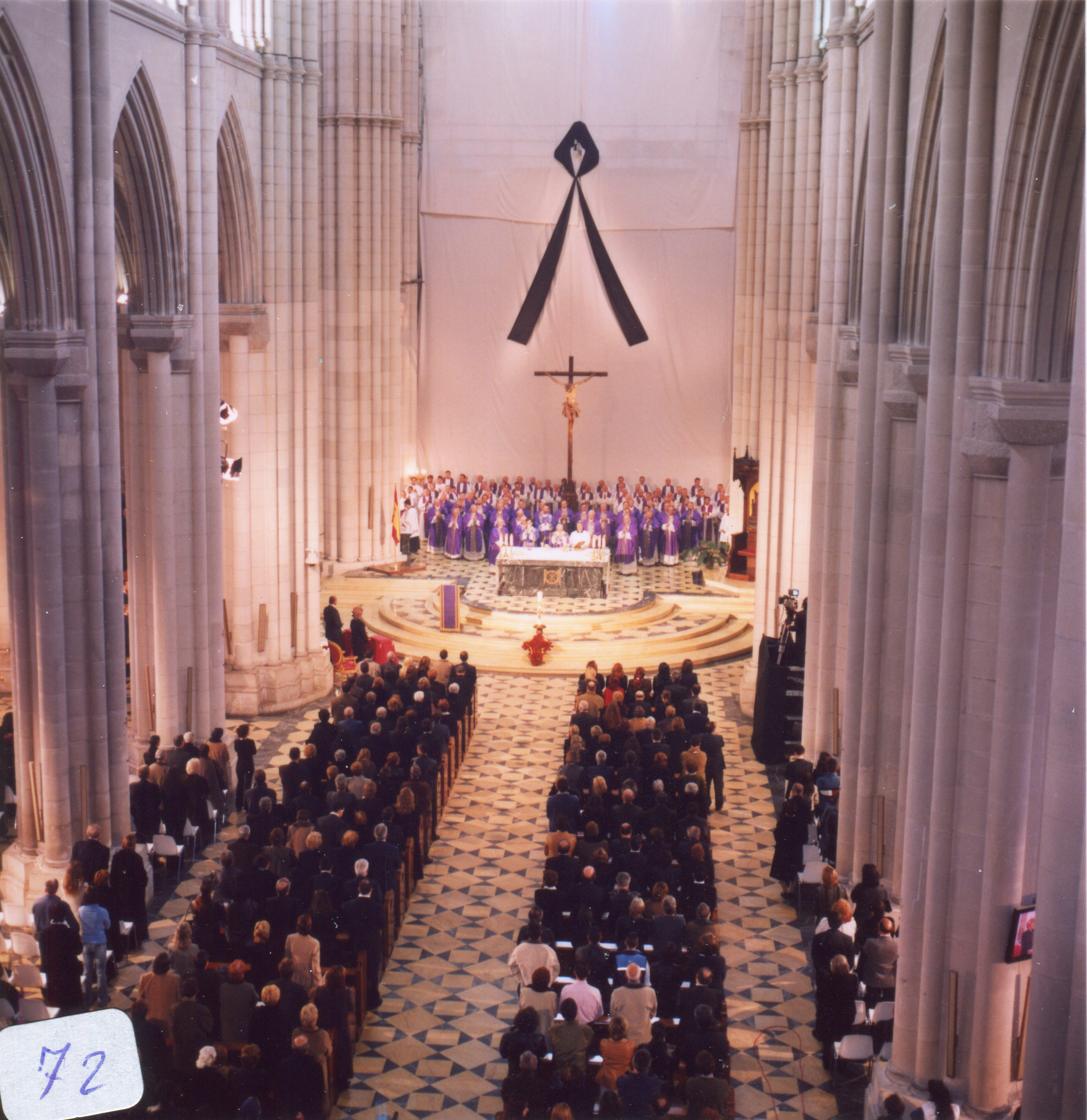
State memorial service at the Almudena Cathedral

A device composed of 12 kilograms of Goma-2 ECO with a detonator and 136 meters of wire (connected to nothing) was found on the track of a high-speed railway line (AVE) on 2 April. The Spanish judiciary chose not to investigate that incident and the perpetrators remain unknown. The device used in the AVE incident was unable to explode because it lacked an initiation system.

Shortly after the AVE incident, police identified an apartment in Leganés, south of Madrid, as the base of operations for the individuals suspected of being the perpetrators of the Madrid and AVE attacks. The suspected militants, Sarhane Abdelmaji "the Tunisian" and Jamal Ahmidan "the Chinese", were trapped inside the apartment by a police raid on the evening of 3 April. At 9:03 pm, when the police attempted to breach the premises, the militants committed suicide by setting off explosives, killing themselves and one of the police officers. Investigators subsequently found that the explosives used in the Leganés explosion were of the same type as those used in 11 March attacks (though it had not been possible to identify a brand of dynamite from samples taken from the trains) and in the thwarted bombing of the AVE line.

Based on the assumption that the militants killed at Leganés were indeed the individuals responsible for the train bombings, the ensuing investigation focused on how they obtained their estimated 200 kg of explosives. The investigation revealed that they had been bought from a retired miner who still had access to blasting equipment.

Five to eight suspects believed to be involved in the 11 March attacks managed to escape. In December 2006, the newspaper ABC reported that ETA reminded Spanish Prime Minister José Luis Rodríguez Zapatero about 11 March 2004 as an example of what could happen unless the government considered their petitions (in reference to the 2004 electoral swing), although the source also makes it clear that ETA 'had nothing to do' with the attack itself.

=== Aftermath ===
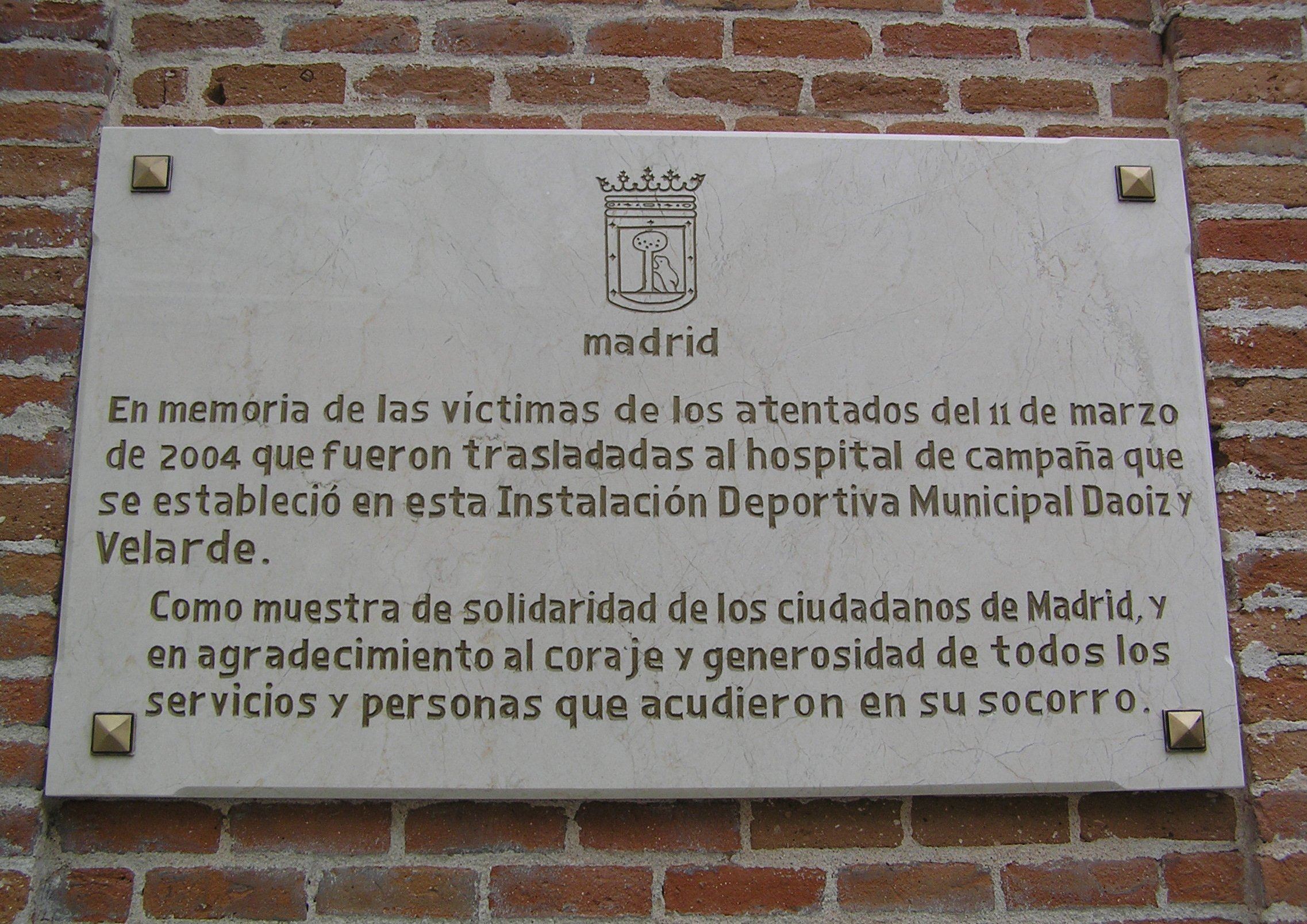
Plaque in memory of the casualties in the 11-M terror attack in Madrid: In memory of the victims of the attacks of 11 March 2004, who were transported to the field hospital established here in the Municipal Sports Centre of Daoiz y Velarde. As an expression of sympathy from Madrid's citizens, and of gratitude for the courage and generosity of all the services and people who came to their aid.

In France, the Vigipirate plan was upgraded to orange level. In Italy, the government declared a state of high alert.

In December 2004, José Luis Rodríguez Zapatero claimed that the PP government erased all of the computer files related to the Madrid bombings, leaving only the documents on paper.

On 25 March 2005, prosecutor Olga Sánchez asserted that the bombings happened 911 days (exactly 2 and a half years) after the 11 September attacks due to the "highly symbolic and qabbalistic charge for local Al-Qaida groups" of choosing that day.

On 27 May 2005, the Prüm Convention, implementing among other things the principle of availability which began to be discussed after the Madrid bombings, was signed by Germany, Spain, France, Luxembourg, Netherlands, Austria, and Belgium.

On 4 January 2007, El País reported that Algerian Ouhnane Daoud, who is considered to be the mastermind of the 11-M bombings, has been searching for ways to return to Spain to prepare further attacks, though this has not been confirmed.

On 17 March 2008, Basel Ghalyoun, Mohamed Almallah Dabas, Abdelillah El-Fadual El-Akil and Raúl González Peña, having been found guilty by the Audiencia Nacional, were released after a Higher Court ruling. This court also verified the release of the Egyptian Rabei Osman al-Sayed.

== Responsibility ==
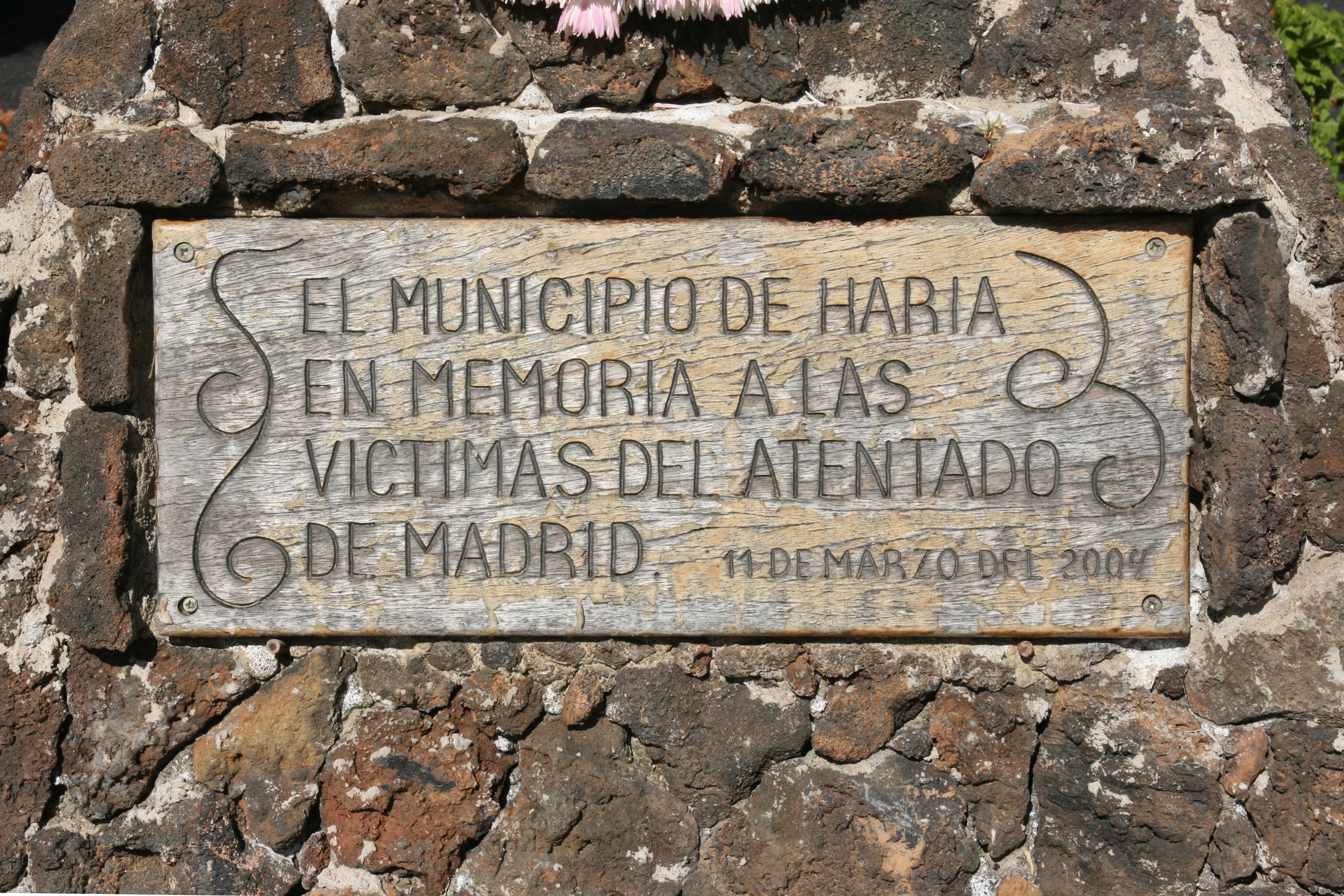
Memorial plaque to the victims in Haría, Lanzarote

On 14 March 2004, Abu Dujana al-Afghani, a purported spokesman for al-Qaeda in Europe, appeared in a videotape claiming responsibility for the attacks.

The Spanish judiciary stated that a loose group of Moroccan, Syrian, and Algerian Muslims and two Guardia Civil and Spanish police informants were suspected of having carried out the attacks. On 11 April 2006, Judge Juan del Olmo charged 29 suspects for their involvement in the train bombings.

No evidence has been found of al-Qaeda involvement, although an al-Qaeda claim was made the day of the attacks by the Abu Hafs al-Masri Brigades. U.S. officials note that this group is "notoriously unreliable". In August 2007, al-Qaeda claimed to be "proud" about the Madrid 2004 bombings.

The Independent reported that "Those who invented the new kind of rucksack bomb used in the attacks are said to have been taught in training camps in Jalalabad, Afghanistan, under instruction from members of Morocco's radical Islamist Combat Group."

Mohamed Darif, a professor of political science at Hassan II University in Mohammedia, stated in 2004 that the history of the Moroccan Combat Group is directly tied to the rise of al-Qaeda in Afghanistan. According to Darif, "Since its inception at the end of the 1990s and until 2001, the role of the organisation was restricted to giving logistic support to al-Qaeda in Morocco, finding its members places to live, providing them with false papers, with the opportunity of marrying Moroccans and with false identities to allow them to travel to Europe. Since 11 September, however, which brought the Kingdom of Morocco in on the side of the fight against terrorism, the organisation switched strategies and opted for terrorist attacks within Morocco itself."

Scholar Rogelio Alonso said in 2007, "the investigation had uncovered a link between the Madrid suspects and the wider world of al-Qaida". Scott Atran said "There isn't the slightest bit of evidence of any relationship with al-Qaida. We've been looking at it closely for years and we've been briefed by everybody under the sun... and nothing connects them." He provides a detailed timeline that lends credence to this view.

According to the European Strategic Intelligence and Security Center, the Islamic extremists' alliance with ETA is highly dubious and "there is not anyway any terror case whatsoever to this day in which islamist internationalists collaborated with non-muslims".

Former Spanish Prime Minister José María Aznar said in 2011 that Abdelhakim Belhadj, leader of the Libyan Islamic Fighting Group and current head of the Tripoli Military Council, was suspected of complicity in the bombings.

=== Allegations of ETA involvement ===
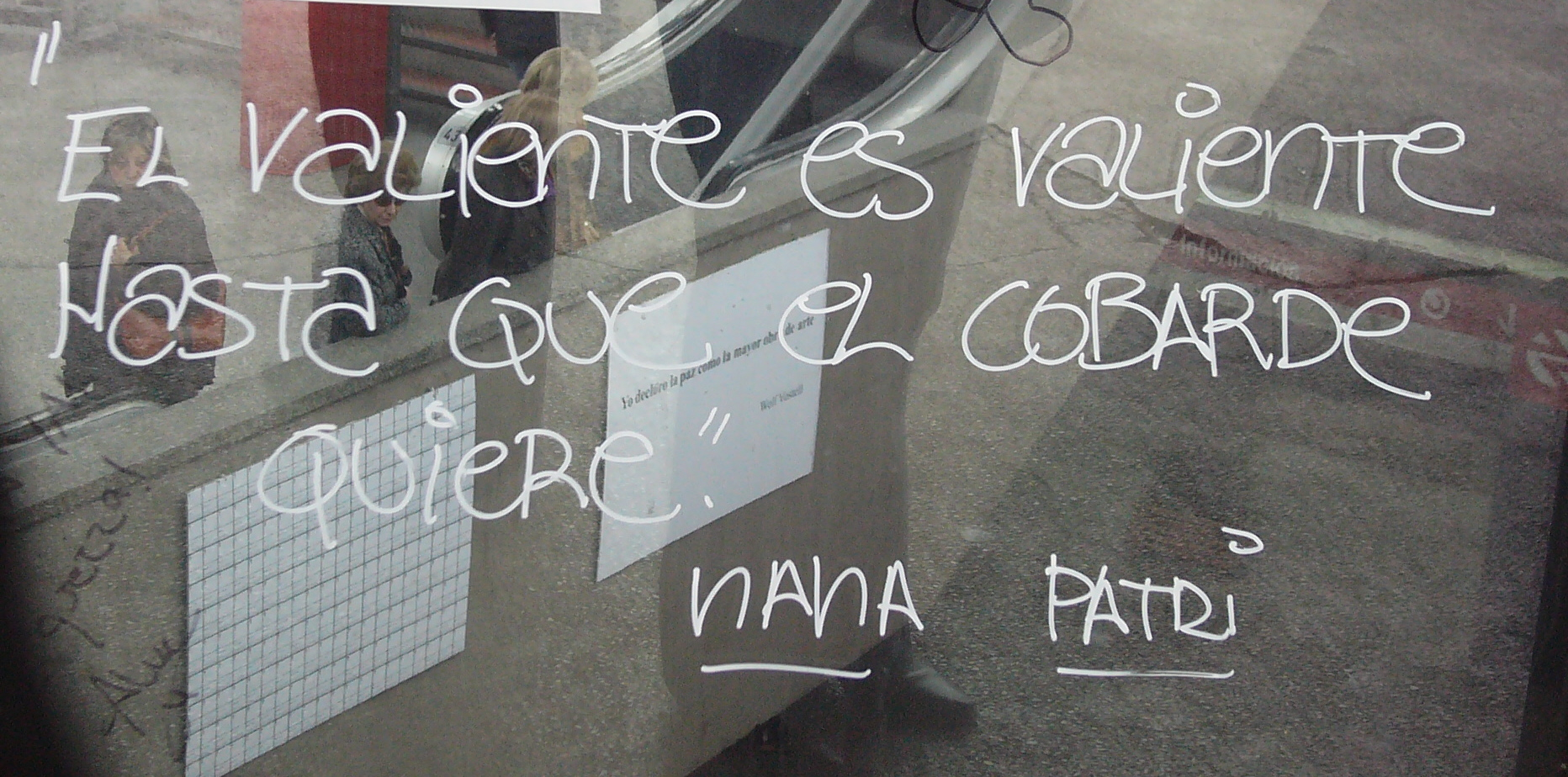
Anonymous protest: "The brave are brave as long as the coward wants".

Immediate reactions to the attacks in Madrid were the several press conferences held by the Spanish prime minister José María Aznar involving ETA. The Spanish government maintained this theory for two days. Because the bombs were detonated three days before the general elections in Spain, the situation had many political interpretations. The United States also initially believed ETA was responsible, then questioning if Islamic extremists were responsible. Spain's third-largest newspaper, ABC, immediately labelled the attacks as "ETA's bloodiest attack."

Due to the government theory, statements issued shortly after the Madrid attacks, including from lehendakari Juan José Ibarretxe identified ETA as the prime suspect, but the group, which usually claims responsibility for its actions, denied any involvement. Later evidence strongly pointed to the involvement of extremist Islamist groups, with the Moroccan Islamic Combatant Group named as a focus of investigations.

Although ETA has a history of mounting bomb attacks in Madrid, 11 March attacks exceeded any attack previously attempted by a European organisation. This led some experts to point out that the tactics used were more typical of militant Islamic extremist groups, perhaps with a certain link to al-Qaeda, or maybe to a new generation of ETA activists using al-Qaeda as a role model. Observers also noted that ETA customarily, but not always, issues warnings before its mass bombings and that there had been no warning for this attack. Europol director Jürgen Storbeck commented that the bombings "could have been ETA... But we're dealing with an attack that doesn't correspond to the modus operandi they have adopted up to now".

Political analysts believe ETA's guilt would have strengthened the PP's chances of being re-elected, as this would have been regarded as the death throes of a terrorist organisation reduced to desperate measures by the strong anti-terrorist policy of the Aznar government. On the other hand, an Islamic extremist attack would have been perceived as the direct result of Spain's involvement in Iraq, an unpopular war that had not been approved by the Spanish Parliament.

=== Investigation ===
All of the devices are thought to have been hidden inside backpacks. The police investigated reports of three people in ski masks getting on and off the trains several times at Alcalá de Henares between 7:00 and 7:10. A Renault Kangoo van was found parked outside the station at Alcalá de Henares containing detonators, audio tapes with Qur'anic verses, and cell phones.

The provincial chief of TEDAX (the bomb disposal experts of the Spanish police) declared on 12 July 2004 that damage in the trains could not be caused by dynamite, but by some type of military explosive, like C3 or C4. An unnamed source from the Aznar administration claimed that the explosive used in the attacks had been Titadine (used by ETA, and intercepted on its way to Madrid 11 days before).

In March 2007, the TEDAX chief claimed that they knew that the unexploded explosive found in the Kangoo van was Goma-2 ECO the very day of the bombings. He also asserted that "it is impossible to know" the components of the explosives that went off in the trains – though he later asserted that it was dynamite. The Judge Javier Gómez Bermúdez replied "I cannot understand" to these assertions.

=== Examination of unexploded devices ===
A radio report mentioned a plastic explosive called "Special C". However, the government said that the explosive found in an unexploded device, discovered among bags thought to be victims' lost luggage, was the Spanish made Goma-2 ECO. The unexploded device contained 10 kg (22 lb) of explosive with 1 kg (2.2 lb) of nails and screws packed around it as shrapnel. In the aftermath of the attacks, however, the chief coroner alleged that no shrapnel was found in any of the victims.

Goma-2 ECO was never before used by al-Qaeda, but the explosive and the modus operandi were described by The Independent as ETA trademarks, although the Daily Telegraph came to the opposite conclusion.

Two bombs, one in Atocha and another in El Pozo station, numbers 11 and 12, were detonated accidentally by the TEDAX. According to the provincial chief of the TEDAX, deactivated rucksacks contained some other type of explosive. The 13th bomb, which was transferred to a police station, contained dynamite, although it did not explode because it was missing two wires connecting the explosives to the detonator. That bomb used a mobile phone (Mitsubishi Trium) as a timer, requiring a SIM card to activate the alarm and thereby detonate. The analysis of the SIM card allowed the police to arrest an alleged perpetrator. On 13 March, when three Moroccans and two Pakistani Muslims were arrested for the attacks, it was confirmed that the attacks came from an Islamist group. Only one of the five persons (the Moroccan Jamal Zougam) detained that day was finally prosecuted.

The Guardia Civil developed an extensive action plan to monitor records corresponding with the use of weapons and explosives. There were 166,000 inspections conducted throughout the country between March 2004 and November 2004. About 2,500 violations were discovered and over 3 tons of explosives, 11 kilometers of detonating cord, and over 15,000 detonators were seized.

=== Suicide of suspects ===
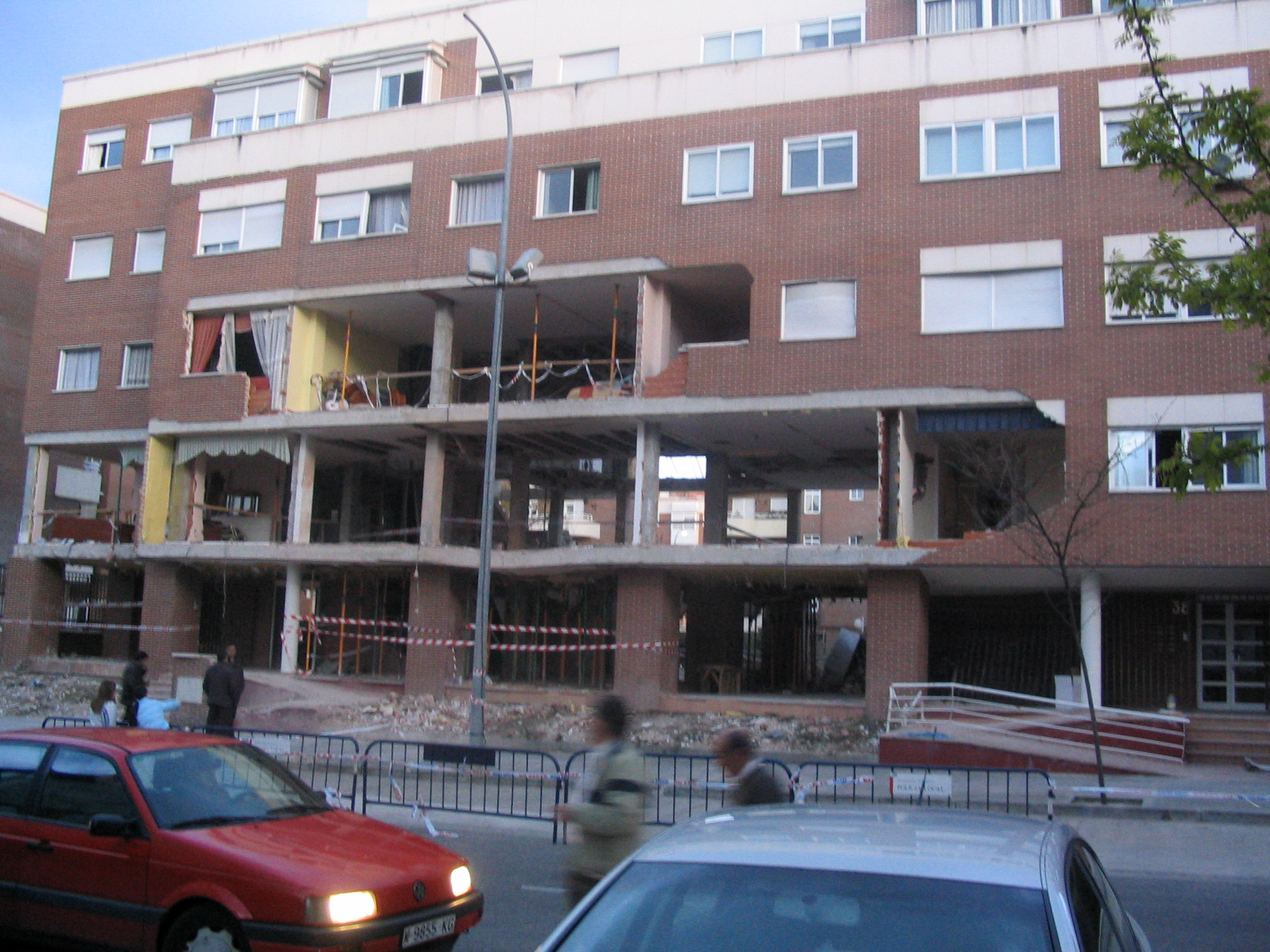
Damaged building in Leganés where the four terrorists died

On 3 April 2004, in Leganés, south Madrid, four terrorists died in an apparent suicide explosion, killing one Grupo Especial de Operaciones (GEO) (Spanish special police assault unit) police officer and wounding eleven policemen. According to witnesses and media, between five and eight suspects escaped that day.

Security forces carried out a controlled explosion of a suspicious package found near the Atocha station and subsequently deactivated the two undetonated devices on the Téllez train. A third unexploded device was later brought from the station at El Pozo to a police station in Vallecas, and became a central piece of evidence for the investigation. It appears that the El Pozo bomb failed to detonate because a cell-phone alarm used to trigger the bomb was set 12 hours late.

=== Conspiracy theories ===
Sectors of the People's Party (PP), and certain media, such as El Mundo newspaper and the COPE radio station, continue to support theories relating the attack to a vast conspiracy to remove the governing party from power. Support for the conspiracy was also given by the Asociación de Víctimas del Terrorismo (AVT), Spain's largest association of victims of terrorism.

These theories speculate that ETA and members of the security forces and national and foreign (Moroccan) secret services were involved in the bombings. Defenders of the claims that ETA participated in some form in the 11 March attacks have affirmed that there is circumstantial evidence linking the Islamic extremists with two ETA members who were detained while driving the outskirts of Madrid in a van containing 500 kg of explosives 11 days before the train bombings. The Madrid judge Coro Cillán continued to hear conspiracy theory cases, including one accusing government officials of ordering the scrapping of the bombed train cars in order to destroy evidence.

=== Invasion of Iraq policy ===
The public seemed convinced that the Madrid Bombings were a result of the Aznar government's alignment with the U.S. and its invasion of Iraq. Before the attack, the incumbent Popular Party led the polls by 5 percent. It is believed that the Popular Party would have won the election if it had not been for the terrorist attack. The Socialist Party, led by José Luis Rodríguez Zapatero, ended up winning the election by 5%. The Socialist Party had called for the removal of Spanish troops from Iraq during its campaigning. Rodríguez Zapatero promised to remove Spanish troops by 30 June 2004, and the troops were withdrawn a month earlier than expected. Twenty-eight percent of voters said that the bombings influenced their opinions and vote. An estimated 1 million voters switched their vote to the Socialist Party after the Madrid bombings. These voters who switched their votes were no longer willing to support the Popular Party's stance on war policy. The bombings also influenced 1,700,000 citizens to vote who did not plan on originally voting. On the other hand, the terrorist attacks discouraged 300,000 people from voting. Overall, there was a net 4 percent increase in voter turnout.

=== Trial ===
Judge Juan del Olmo found "local cells of Islamic extremists inspired through the Internet" guilty for the 11 March attacks, rather than the Armed Islamic Group or the Moroccan Islamic Combatant Group. These local cells consisted of hashish traffickers of Moroccan origin, remotely linked to an al-Qaeda cell that had been already captured. These groups bought the explosives (dynamite Goma-2 ECO) from low-level thieves, police and Guardia Civil informers in Asturias using money from the small-scale drug trafficking.

According to El Mundo, "the notes found on the Moroccan informer 'Cartagena' prove that the Police had the leaders of the cell responsible for the 11 March attacks under surveillance." However, none of the notes refer to the preparation of any terrorist attack.

The trial of 29 defendants began on 15 February 2007. According to El País, "the Court dismantled one by one all conspiracy theories" and demonstrated that any link with or involvement in the bombings by ETA was either misleading or groundless. During the trial the defendants retracted their previous statements and denied any involvement. According to El Mundo the questions of "by whom, why, when and where the Madrid train attacks were planned" are still "unanswered", because the alleged masterminds of the attacks were acquitted. El Mundo also claimed – among other misgivings — that the Spanish judiciary reached "scientifically unsound" conclusions about the kind of explosives used in the trains, and that no direct al-Qaeda link was found, thus "debunking the key argument of the official version". Anthropologist Scott Atran described the Madrid trial as "a complete farce" stating that "There isn't the slightest bit of evidence of any operational relationship with al-Qaida". Instead, "The overwhelming majority of [terrorist cells] in Europe have nothing to do with al-Qaida other than a vague relationship of ideology."

Though the trial proceeded smoothly in its opening months, 14 of the 29 defendants began a hunger strike in May, protesting against the allegedly "unfair" role of political parties and media in the legal proceedings. Judge Javier Gómez Bermúdez refused to suspend the trial despite the strike, and the hunger strikers ended their fast on 21 May.

The last hearing of the trial was held on 2 July 2007.

On 31 October 2007, the Audiencia Nacional of Spain handed down its judgements. Of the 28 defendants in the trial, 21 were found guilty on a range of charges from forgery to murder. Two of the defendants were each sentenced to more than 40,000 years in prison.

Jamal Zougam (born 5 October 1973) is one of the men convicted for the bombings. He was detained on 13 March 2004, accused of multiple counts of murder, attempted murder, stealing a vehicle, belonging to a terrorist organisation and four counts of carrying out terrorist acts. Spain's El País newspaper reported that three witnesses testified to seeing him leave a rucksack aboard one of the bombed trains, specifically, the one that exploded at Santa Eugenia station. Born in Morocco, Zougam owned a mobile phone shop in the Lavapiés neighborhood in Madrid called Nuevo Siglo (The New Century). He is believed to be the person who sold telephones which were used to detonate the bombs in the attack. He also reportedly helped construct the bombs and was one of the first to be arrested.

On 31 October 2007, he was convicted of 191 charges of murder and 1,856 charges of attempted murder, and received a sentence of 42,922 years in confinement. A Spaniard, Emilio Suárez Trashorras, who supplied dynamite, stolen from a mine in Asturias in return for drugs – was sentenced to 34,715 years. Neither is expected to serve more than 40 years, which in 2007 was the maximum prison term under by Spanish law.

== Police surveillance and informants ==
In the investigations carried out to find out what went wrong in the security services, many individual instances of negligence and miscoordination between different branches of the police were found. The group dealing with Islamist extremists was very small and in spite of having carried out some surveillances, they were unable to stop the bombings. Also, some of the criminals involved in the "Little Mafia" who provided the explosives were police informants and had leaked to their case officers some tips that were not followed up on.

Some of the alleged perpetrators of the bombing were reportedly under surveillance by the Spanish police since 2001.

At the time of the Madrid bombings, Spain was well equipped with internal security structures that were, for the most part, effective in the fight against terrorism. It became evident that there were coordination issues between police forces as well as within each of them. The Interior Ministry focused on correcting these weaknesses. It was Spain's goal to strengthen its police intelligence in order to deal with the risks and threats of international terrorism. This decision for the National Police and the Guardia Civil to strengthen their counter-terrorism services, led to an increase in jobs aimed at preventing and fighting global terrorism. Counter-terrorism services increased its employment by nearly 35% during the legislature. Human resources in external information services, dealing with international terrorism, grew by 72% in the National Police force and 22% in the Guardia Civil.

== Suspects ==
This is a list of suspects and convictions related to the bombings.

=== Convicted defendants ===
- Jamal Zougam – guilty and given a 40,000-year sentence in October 2007 (though Spanish law limits maximum time served to 40 years).
- José Emilio Suárez Trashorras – guilty and given between a 25,000 to 35,000-year jail sentence. He was one of the first to be arrested.
- Hamid Ahmidan – found guilty and given between a 23- to 25-year sentence. Moroccan and a cousin of Jamal Ahmidan, these men took part in drug trafficking. His release date from prison is November 2030. After his release, he will be deported to Morocco.
- Abdelmajid Bouchar – acquitted of all the bombings and still given between a 15- to 18-year sentence, was detained in Belgrade in August 2005 by Serbian officials. Released November 2023 and deported to Morocco.
- Rachid Aglif – found guilty and given between a 15- to 18-year sentence. he was arrested in April and he was an alleged lieutenant of Jamal Ahmidan, who was suspected of having helped acquire the explosives. His release date is set for November 2025. He will be deported to Morocco. While a prisoner in El Castellón, he established a "special friendship" with imam Abdelbaki Es Satty, main suspect of the 2017 Barcelona attacks.
- Youssef Belhadj – 30, acquitted of bombings but given 12.5-year sentence for membership of a terrorist organisation. He was arrested in Belgium in February 2005 by the Belgian Police, he allegedly set the date for the attacks and was in Spain for the last-minute preparations. Released November 2019 and deported to Morocco.
- Hassan el-Haski – 45 acquitted of bombings but handed 12-year sentence for membership of a terrorist organisation. He was the leader of the Moroccan Islamic Combatant Group in Spain, which prosecutors blamed for the bombings. Haski, from Morocco, but having been "a long time resident of Molenbeek" (Brussels), was arrested in the Canary Islands in December 2004. He was accused of having been aware of and having instigated the attacks. Released in November 2019 and deported to Morocco.
- Mohamed Bouharrat, guilty and given 12-year sentence, was responsible for recruitment and gathering information on targets. Released in November 2019 and deported to Morocco.
- Fouad el-Morabit – guilty, 12-year sentence was being held in March 2004 for allegedly belonging to the Madrid terror cell, he also had contacts with Rabei Osman. Released in November 2019 and deported to Morocco.
- Mouhannad Almallah Dabas – guilty, 12-year sentence. Released and deported to Morocco.
- Saed el-Harrak – guilty, 12-year sentence, currently described as an active cell member. Released in November 2019 and deported to Morocco.
- Mohamed Larbi Ben Sellam, guilty, 12-year sentence, was allegedly in charge of bringing propaganda material to meetings of the cell. Prosecutors had asked for 27 years. Released in November 2019 and deported to Morocco.
- Basel Ghalyoun – 26, guilty, 12-year sentence, was allegedly had links to Rabei Osman and the presumed ideological mastermind, Serhan Ben Abdelmajid Fakhet, a Tunisian who also died in the apartment blast. Prosecutors had sought a 12-year sentence. Released in November 2019 and deported to Morocco.
- Rafa Zouhier – 27, guilty of obtaining explosives and given 10-year sentence. Released in November 2017 and deported.
- Abdelilah el-Fadual el-Akil, guilty, nine-year sentence, was alleged close associate of Jamal Ahmidan, he had worked at a house on the outskirts of Madrid where some bombs had been made there. Prosecutors had asked for 12 years. Released and deported in November 2016.
- Rául González Peláez – guilty and given a 5-year sentence, was allegedly helped him gain access to the explosives in exchange for cocaine. Prosecutors had sought an eight-year sentence. Released in November 2012.
- Sergio Alvarez Sánchez – guilty, 3-year sentence travelled in January 2004 to Madrid with a sports bag containing up to 15 kg (33 lbs) of explosives for Jamal Ahmidan. Prosecutors had sought a four-year sentence. Released in November 2010.
- Antonio Iván Reis Palacio – guilty, given 3-year sentence, transported explosives to Madrid, Spain. Spanish prosecutors had sought a four-year jail term. Released in November 2010.
- Nasreddine Bousbaa – guilty, 3-year sentence, he was allegedly helped forge fake documents. Spanish prosecutors had asked for 13 years in jail. Released in November 2010 and deported.
- Mahmoud Slimane Aoun – guilty, 3-year sentence. he was allegedly trying to help Jamal Ahmidan forge documents. Spanish prosecutors had asked for 13 years in jail. Released in November 2010 and deported.

=== Acquitted defendants ===
- Rabei Osman – arrested in Milan, Italy in June 2004 by Italian State Police for supporting terrorism in Europe. He was held in an Italian prison before being transferred to Spain in 2007 and he was an alleged member of al-Jihad by Ayman al-Zawahiri. Osman was sentenced in Italy on 11 June 2006 to 10 years in prison for plotting terror attack in Italy and afterwards was extradited to Spain in 2007. In February 2007 Osman's trial began in Madrid, along with other 28 defendants, for having a key role in the 2004 Madrid train bombings. In October 2007 Osman was acquitted in Madrid from all charges with other 5 suspects.

=== Wrongful arrest ===
- Brandon Mayfield was arrested 6 May 2004 on a material witness charge, on the basis of a fingerprint found after 11 March 2004 Madrid attacks. Although Spanish authorities were doubtful that the identification was correct, he was held for two weeks in federal custody until they conclusively identified the fingerprint as belonging to another man and was released by the FBI authorities.

=== Other suspects ===
- Mustafa Setmariam Nasar – arrested in Quetta, Pakistan in October 2005 as he was shopping for breakfast, close to the Pakistani-Afghan border by the Pakistani Inter-Services Intelligence. He was held as a Spanish citizen, holding status since the late 1980s following marriage to a Spanish woman. He was wanted for the 2004 Madrid bombings and the 2005 London bombings. The FBI had offered a US$5 million reward for his capture and President Pervez Musharraf of Pakistan stated in that his country has received a huge amount of substantial sums in bounties from American authorities.
- Abdelilah Hriz – arrested in his native Morocco in January 2008 by Moroccan police. In Rabat, Hriz was found guilty and sentenced up to 20 years in prison in December 2008.
- On 29 April 2011, the German Federal Police arrested 3 Moroccans in the western German city of Düsseldorf and one in nearby Bochum. The Moroccans were linked with the 2004 Madrid train bombings and 2005 London transit attacks. The arrests were based on suspicion they were planning a terror attack in the country, they said. Local media reports that officers had seized large amounts of explosives when the three were arrested. The three alleged terrorists were brought to a judge the next day, and they were to remain in detention pending an awaiting trial.

== Controversies ==
The authorship of the bombings remains a controversial issue in Spain. Sectors of the Partido Popular (PP) and some of the PP-friendly media outlets (primarily El Mundo and the Libertad Digital radio station) claim that there are inconsistencies and contradictions in the Spanish judicial investigation.

As Spanish and international investigations continue to claim the unlikeliness of ETA's active implication, these claims have shifted from direct accusations involving the Basque separatist organisation to less specific insinuations and general scepticism. Additionally, there is controversy over the events that took place between the bombings and the general elections held three days later.

== Reactions ==
In the aftermath of the bombings, there were massive street demonstrations across Spain to protest against the train bombings. Two people died in political violence about the ETA controversy. The international reaction was also notable, as the scale of the attack became clearer.

== Memorials ==
A memorial service for the victims of this incident was held on 25 March 2004 at the Almudena Cathedral. It was attended by King Juan Carlos I, Queen Sofía, the victims' families, and representatives from numerous other countries, including British prime minister Tony Blair, French president Jacques Chirac, German chancellor Gerhard Schröder, and U.S. Secretary of State Colin Powell.

The Atocha station memorial and the Forest of Remembrance in Parque del Buen Retiro commemorate the victims.

== See also ==
- List of terrorist incidents involving railway systems
- 2000 Madrid bombing
- February 2004 Moscow Metro bombing, a very similar attack barely five weeks before.
- 2006 Madrid–Barajas Airport bombing
- 11 July 2006 Mumbai train bombings
- 7 July 2005 London bombings
- 21 July 2005 London bombings
- 2006 German train bombing attempts
