= Assassination of Luis Carrero Blanco =

1973 murder in Madrid, Spain

Coordinates: 40.43427°N 3.68550°W

- Part of the Basque conflict
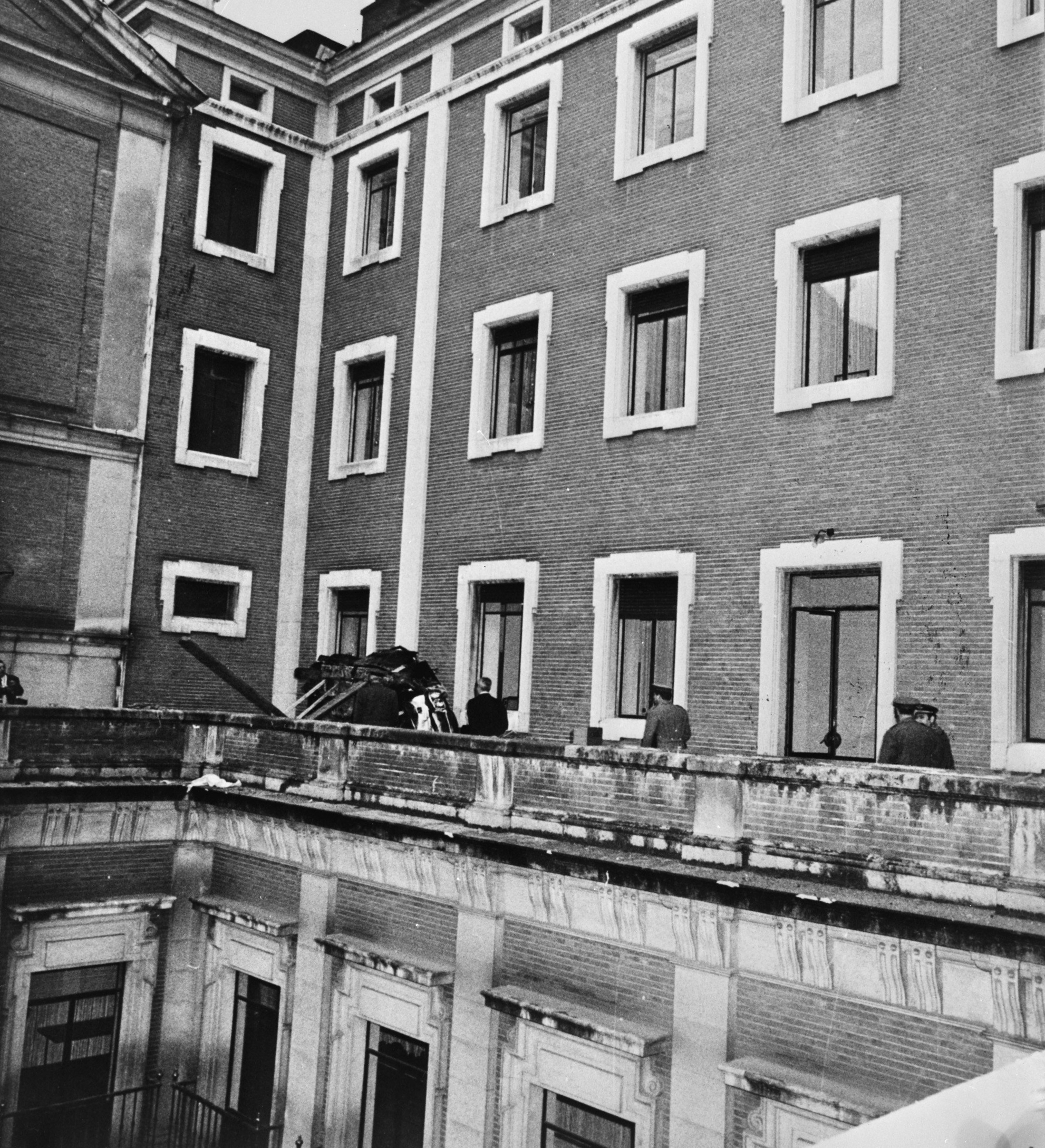
- Carrero Blanco's Dodge Dart on the balcony immediately after the explosion
- Location: Madrid, Spain
- Date: 20 December 1973; 52 years ago 9:36 a.m. (CET)
- Target: Luis Carrero Blanco
- Attack type: Assassination by explosive device
- Weapon: Goma-2 explosives
- Deaths: 3 (including Carrero Blanco)
- Perpetrator: ETA

On 20 December 1973, Luis Carrero Blanco, the Prime Minister of Spain, was assassinated when a cache of explosives in a tunnel set up by the Basque separatist group ETA was detonated. The assassination, also known by its code name Operación Ogro or Ogro Operazioa (Operation Ogre), is considered to have been the biggest attack against the Francoist State since the end of the Spanish Civil War in 1939 and had far-reaching consequences within the politics of Spain.

The death of Carrero Blanco had numerous political implications. By the end of 1973, the physical health of dictator Francisco Franco had declined significantly, and it epitomized the final crisis of the Francoist regime. Following Carrero Blanco's death, the most conservative sector of the Francoist State, known as the búnker, wanted to influence Franco so that he would choose an ultraconservative as Prime Minister. Finally, he chose Carlos Arias Navarro, who originally announced a partial relaxation of the most rigid aspects of the Francoist State, but quickly retreated under pressure from the búnker. ETA, on the other hand, consolidated its place as a relevant armed group and would evolve to become one of the main opponents of Francoism.

== Assassination ==
An ETA commando unit using the code name Txikia (after the nom de guerre of ETA activist Eustakio Mendizabal, killed by the Guardia Civil in April 1973) rented a basement flat at Calle Claudio Coello 104, Madrid, on the route by which Carrero Blanco regularly went to mass at San Francisco de Borja church.

Over five months, the unit dug a tunnel under the street – telling the landlord that they were student sculptors to hide their true purpose. The tunnel was packed with 80 kg (180 lb) of Goma-2 that had been stolen from a government depot.

On 20 December at 9:36 am, a three-man ETA commando unit disguised as electricians detonated the explosives by command wire as Carrero Blanco's Dodge Dart passed. The blast sent Blanco and his car 20 metres (66 ft) into the air and over the five-story church, landing on the second-floor terrace of the opposite side. Carrero Blanco survived the blast but died at 10:15 am in hospital. His bodyguard and driver died shortly afterwards. The "electricians" shouted to stunned passers-by that there had been a gas explosion, and then fled in the confusion. ETA claimed responsibility on 22 January 1974.

In a collective interview justifying the attack, the ETA bombers said:

The execution in itself had an order and some clear objectives. From the beginning of 1951 Carrero Blanco practically occupied the government headquarters in the regime. Carrero Blanco symbolized better than anyone else the figure of "pure Francoism" and without totally linking himself to any of the Francoist tendencies, he covertly attempted to push Opus Dei into power. A man without scruples conscientiously mounted his own State within the State: he created a network of informers within the Ministries, in the Army, in the Falange, and also in Opus Dei. His police managed to put themselves into all the Francoist apparatus. Thus he made himself the key element of the system and a fundamental piece of the oligarchy's political game. On the other hand, he came to be irreplaceable for his experience and capacity to manoeuvre and because nobody managed as he did to maintain the internal equilibrium of Francoism.

— Julen Agirre, Operation Ogro: The Execution of Admiral Luis Carrero Blanco

The Spanish opposition in exile did not condemn the killing and, in some cases, even welcomed it. According to Laura Desfor Edles, professor of sociology at California State University, Northridge, some analysts consider the assassination of Carrero Blanco to be the only thing the ETA have ever done to "further the cause of Spanish democracy". However, former ETA member turned writer Jon Juaristi contended that ETA's goal with the killing was not democratization but a spiral of violence to fully destabilize Spain, heighten Franco's repression against Basque nationalism and force the average Basque citizen to support the lesser evil in the form of the ETA against Franco.

According to colonel Amadeo Martínez Inglés, it was planned, organized and carried out by CIA, for its similarities with the assassination of René Schneider, with the collaboration of ETA. Others debate this, such as British historian Charles Powell. A regular daily briefing given by the CIA to the President of the United States the day after the attack was also declassified, in which they admitted to not knowing the cause of death and linked it to a possible gas leak.

== Reaction ==
A government meeting about the "dangers of subversion threatening Spain" was scheduled to take place on 20 December 1973. Both Carrero Blanco and the United States Secretary of State, Henry Kissinger, had expressed concern about a left-wing uprising during the meeting they held on 19 December. When government officials reached the Palace of Villamejor, they learned about Carrero Blanco's death. Deputy Prime Minister Torcuato Fernández Miranda demanded calm and announced that he was going to call Franco so that Franco could decide what to do next. After the call, Fernández Miranda proclaimed himself prime minister, in accordance with the dispositions laid out in the Organic Law of the State. His first decision as prime minister was to decline to declare a state of exception.

Gabriel Pita da Veiga, Minister of the Navy, informed Fernández Miranda that Carlos Iniesta Cano, Director-General of the Civil Guard, had decided to "maximize surveillance" and ordered agents through a telegram not to hesitate to use deadly force if any clash occurred. However, Fernández Miranda was opposed and made Iniesta Cano reverse this order immediately through a telegram.

== In popular culture ==
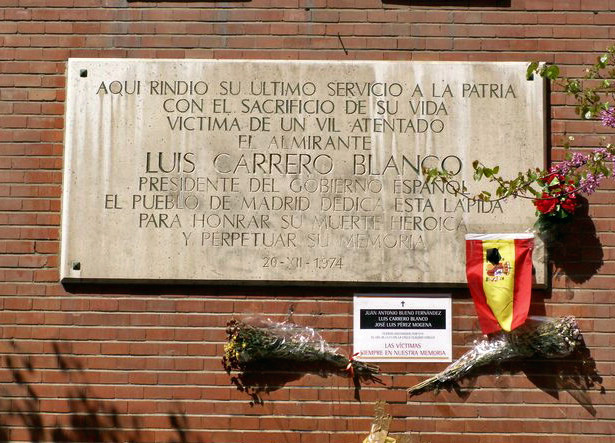
Memorial plate at the site of the assassination of Admiral Luis Carrero Blanco.

In 1974, Eva Forest, under the pseudonym Julen Agirre, wrote the account of the operation in the book Operación Ogro, which later served as the basis for Gillo Pontecorvo’s 1979 film of the same name. Twenty years later, the book was republished by Hiru publishing house, with new contributions and a new chapter that provided more details about the group's escape, as the original edition included intentionally misleading information in order to cover their escape.

Etxamendi and Larralde adapted the American singer-songwriter Marty Robbins' song "El Paso" and created the song "Yup! la-la" about the assassination. The song became famous by the end of the 1970s. Later, the Italian band Banda Bassotti covered it on their 2003 album Así es mi vida, and they had issues with the Spanish Association of Victims of Terrorism because of the song, who consider all targets of ETA's actions, including Carrero Blanco, as victims of terrorism.

The car used in the assassination attempt has been on display at the Spanish Army's Automobile Museum in Torrejón de Ardoz since 2014, and is available for public viewing.

== See also ==
- Cassandra case, student prosecuted for posting a series of tweets poking fun at the assassination of Luis Carrero Blanco
- Operación Ogro, a 1979 film about the attack
- The Last Circus, a film where the attack is a minor part of the plot
