= Iraultza =

- Dates active: 1982–1996
- Active regions: Bilbao, Basque Autonomous Community, Spain
- Ideology: Anti-capitalistic
- Status: Defunct
- Size: less than 50 people

Iraultza (Basque for Revolution) was a small Basque militant armed group of leftist tendency, active between 1982 and 1996 as a response to the suppression of the Basque resistance movement. It was thought to be a group of less than 50 people based in Bilbao, largely focused on the destruction of property, particularly those of American multinational corporations and against other smaller Spanish companies involved in labor disputes, in support of Workers' self-management and mobilization, although one of its attacks was responsible for the death of one individual and several for minor injuries of others. According to newspaper El País it was thought to be responsible for over 210 attacks during its existence.

The group was described by the United States government as "probably [having] committed more bombings against American business interests than any other European terrorist group".

== Origin and motives ==
The origins of Iraultza have been speculated by several including the James Baker/George P. Shultz-era United States Department of State, and El Pais as being formed of former members of Communist Movement of Euskadi, although the movement itself denied any link between the two organisations.

The group was reported as intending to attack property, but not civilians. Although the press had reported a manifesto had been distributed by Iraultza after its formation, their motives were not widely reported, although they were speculated upon. The ideology of Iraultza based upon their attacks conforms to the pattern of industrial sabotage against mainly American multinational corporations, banks, and corporations or institutions which were perceived as anti-worker or anti-populist. Iraultza also espoused anti-capitalistic ideological views.

== Deaths ==
=== The group itself ===
The majority of the deaths caused by Iraultza were to their own members while placing bombs; seven members died that way.

On 13 December 1986 Juan Carlos Gallardo was killed on Roncesvalles Avenue in Pamplona, Navarre. He had placed a bomb next to the car of an industrialist with the surname Figanda, whose sausage company was involved in a strong labor conflict at the time, and was firing workers. The device exploded next to the car, killing Gallardo.

After Gallardo's death, a moment of silence and march through was held by over 3,000 people, who also were in attendance to protest the death of Mikel Zabalza. The protest went through the streets of Pamplona, walking past the site of Gallardo's death, and some among the crowd chanted support for Iraultza and ETA, although relatives of Zabalza and other residents of Orbaizeta remained quiet.

On 1 May 1991, police confirmed that they had found several people who had been killed in an explosion in the remains of a SEAT 131 car, and identified via their identity documents María Rosa Diez Sáez (30) from Barakaldo and Jesús Fernández Miguel (40), the owner of the car, and found bank savings account documents from another person, reported as Soledad Múgica Areitioaurtena (40) from Ermua, in the wreckage. El Pais reported that Sáez and Areitioaurtena had been involved in radical assemblies, but that Miguel was unknown to authorities.

The following day, Iraultza contacted the newspaper Egin to confirm that the three fatalities were its members. Police sources stated that the three deceased had just placed devices which had detonated in Bilbao and Barakaldo before they were killed manipulating an explosive device.

=== José Miguel Moros Peña ===
According to the newspaper El Pais, on Friday 27 June 1986 José Miguel Moros Peña (18), a resident of Portagalete and construction worker for Urgandía, a subcontractor for firms Dragados and OCP Construcciones (as of January 2019 a part of ACS Group) was starting a piece of drill machinery (later reported as a crane) at around 7:50 am when a bomb attached to it exploded, fatally injuring him. The bomb's timer had apparently failed to detonate the bomb, but the movement of the drill machinery was thought to have initiated the detonation.

An anonymous call was made prior to the detonation to the Santurzi Municipal Police at 11:45 pm on Monday 23 June 1986, and a bomb squad was sent out to check but reportedly found nothing. The police chief of Bilbao later stated that the police considered the call to be one of many false alarms, and did not consider checking the area again in daylight.

== Incidents ==
Iraultza Bombings
Date	Location	Target	Description	Claimed motive	Casualties	Sources
5 May 1982	Bilbao, Basque Country, Spain	Bolsa de Bilbao (Bilbao Stock Exchange)	Bomb placed on the facade of the building detonated, causing glass damage.	Not given / reported	None	
5 May 1982	Bilbao, Basque Country, Spain	Cámara de Compensación Bancaria (Chamber of Banking Compensation – a clearing house)	Bomb placed on the facade of the building detonated, causing glass damage.	Not given / reported.	None	
19 July 1982	Bilbao, Basque Country, Spain	Porcelanas del Bidasoa director Mateo José Hernández	According to El Pais, a bomb was placed under the car of the director, which was discovered and subsequently disarmed. The group had placed various calls to newspapers explaining the presence of the bomb.	Not given / reported.	None	
6 November 1982	Tolosa, Bilbao, Basque Country, Spain	An employment office.	400g of explosives more potent than Goma-2 detonated inside the office.	Not given / reported.	None	
6 November 1982	Lasarte, Bilbao, Basque Country, Spain	A professional training center.	200g of explosives more potent than Goma-2 detonated inside the office.	Not given / reported.	None	
October–November 1982	Bilbao, Basque Country, Spain	Registro de la Propiedad de Portugalete y Baracaldo (Portugalete and Baracaldo Land Registry office)	Not disclosed.	Not given / reported.	None reported.	
22 December 1982 (1:30 am)	Bilbao, Basque Country, Spain	Bank of America	A bomb was placed with an automatic timer, detonating and causing large property damage.	Solidarity against the criminal plans of American imperialism ("Yankee Imperialism")	None	
22 December 1982 (1:45 am)	Calle María Díaz de Haro, Bilbao, Basque Country, Spain	Ford Motor Company	A bomb was placed with an automatic timer, detonating and causing large property damage.	Solidarity against the criminal plans of American imperialism ("Yankee Imperialism")	None	
22 December 1982 (2:00 am)	Calle doctor Areilza, Bilbao, Basque Country, Spain	Avis Rent a Car	A bomb was placed with an automatic timer, detonating and causing large property damage.	Solidarity against the criminal plans of American imperialism ("Yankee Imperialism")	None	
3 January 1984	Calle Rodríguez Arias, Bilbao, Basque Country, Spain	Confederación General de Empresarios de Vizcaya (General confederation of Vizcayan Employers)	Bomb placed in the offices exploded as police arrived, causing damage to the premises and cars nearby,	An anti-capitalist attack against the bosses presided over by politician Luis Olarra, the "top representative" of the general confederation of Vizcayan Employers.	None	
18 November 1984	Bilbao, Basque Country, Spain	IBM	According to the CIA, A bomb was placed within an IBM office in Bilbao, causing significant property damage but no injuries. A second bomb was defused by the police.	Not given / reported.	None	
3 February 1985	Undisclosed location, Spain	Firestone Tire and Rubber Company	Bomb was detonated at a Firestone office in an undisclosed location in Spain, causing only property damage.	Solidarity with the people of Central America against American imperialism.	None	
2 May 1985	Undisclosed location, Spain	Branch of Norton (Possibly then-Peter Norton Computing)	Bomb detonated in branch causing property damage.	Not given / reported.	None	
12 November 1985	Undisclosed location, Spain	Honeywell Bull (a recent multinational merger between then-Compagnie des Machines Bull of France, NEC of Japan, and Honeywell of the United States)	Bomb detonated causing property damage.	Solidarity with the people of Central America and other countries in denouncing American imperialism. It also denounced the Spanish Socialist Workers' Party (PSOE)'s policy regarding NATO.	None	
27 June 1986 (00:20 am)	Bilbao, Basque Country, Spain	3M	Minor property damage	Not given / reported.	Minor injuries to unnamed policeman	
27 June 1986 (07:50 am)	Santurzi, Basque Country, Spain	Spanish-owned companies Dragados (not an owner of a United States-based subsidiary until 2005) and OCP Construcciones	Destruction of property, death of worker on-site caused by machine triggering timer.	In protest against the United States' support of the Contras (see also: Iran–Contra affair).	1 death, José Miguel Moros Peña (18 years)	
19 November 1983	Errekalde, Lasarte, Basque Country	Coca-Cola	Bombing destroyed windows of the factory, packaging and cleaning facilities, and furniture. Estimated at 500,000 pesetas, $8,131 in 2019.	Not given / reported.	None.	
26 April 1993	Plaza del Botxo, Barakaldo, Basque Country, Spain	Telefónica (Then partly owned by Motorola and the Spanish Government)	Police arrived after receiving an anonymous phone call about the bomb, cordoned off the area prior to the explosion. A 10 kg Ammonal bomb detonated causing extensive damage to vehicles and properties within 100 meters.	Claimed but no motive provided. Suggested as a protest against the Government's economic policy and the 1993 economic downturn in Spain following the Banesto scandal.	3 police officers admitted to hospital, 1 with respiratory problems.	
26 April 1993	Iparraguirre, Bilbao, Basque Country, Spain	Banco Exterior de España	Police arrived after being notified via anonymous call, and cordoned off the area prior to the explosion. A 2.5 kg ammonal bomb placed in a can outside of the bank detonated, causing damage to the bank and shattering the glass of 112 homes.	Claimed but no motive provided. Suggested as a protest against the Government's economic policy and the 1993 economic downturn in Spain following the Banesto scandal.	4 police officers with minor injuries (minor blunt trauma, splinters and hearing damage)	
