= Rabei Osman =

- Born: 22 July 1971 (age 55); Samanoud, Gharbia Governorate, Egypt
- Arrested: July 2004; Milan, Italy; Italian State Police
- Citizenship: Egyptian
- Alleged to be a member of: Egyptian Islamic Jihad
- Charge(s): membership and belonging to a terrorist group organization of Egyptian Islamic Jihad and plotting a terror attack in Italy
- Penalty: 10 years imprisonment
- Status: extradited to Spain in February 2007, remains in Spanish custody

Rabei Osman Syed Ahmed (Arabic: ربيع عثمان سيد أحمد) is an Egyptian citizen who was arrested in July 2004 by Italian State Police on terrorism charges. He was accused of multiple counts of murder, attempted murder, stealing a vehicle, belonging to a terrorist organisation (Egyptian Islamic Jihad) and four counts of carrying out terrorist acts of the 2004 Madrid train bombings.

Rabei Osman was sentenced in Italy on 6 November 2006 to 10 years in prison for plotting terror attack in Italy and afterwards was extradited to Spain in 2007.

In February 2007 Rabei Osman's trial began in Madrid, along with other 28 defendants, for having a key role in the 2004 Madrid train bombings. In October 2007 Rabei Osman was acquitted in Madrid from all charges with other 5 suspects.
