= Tirso de Molina (Madrid Metro) =

Madrid Metro station

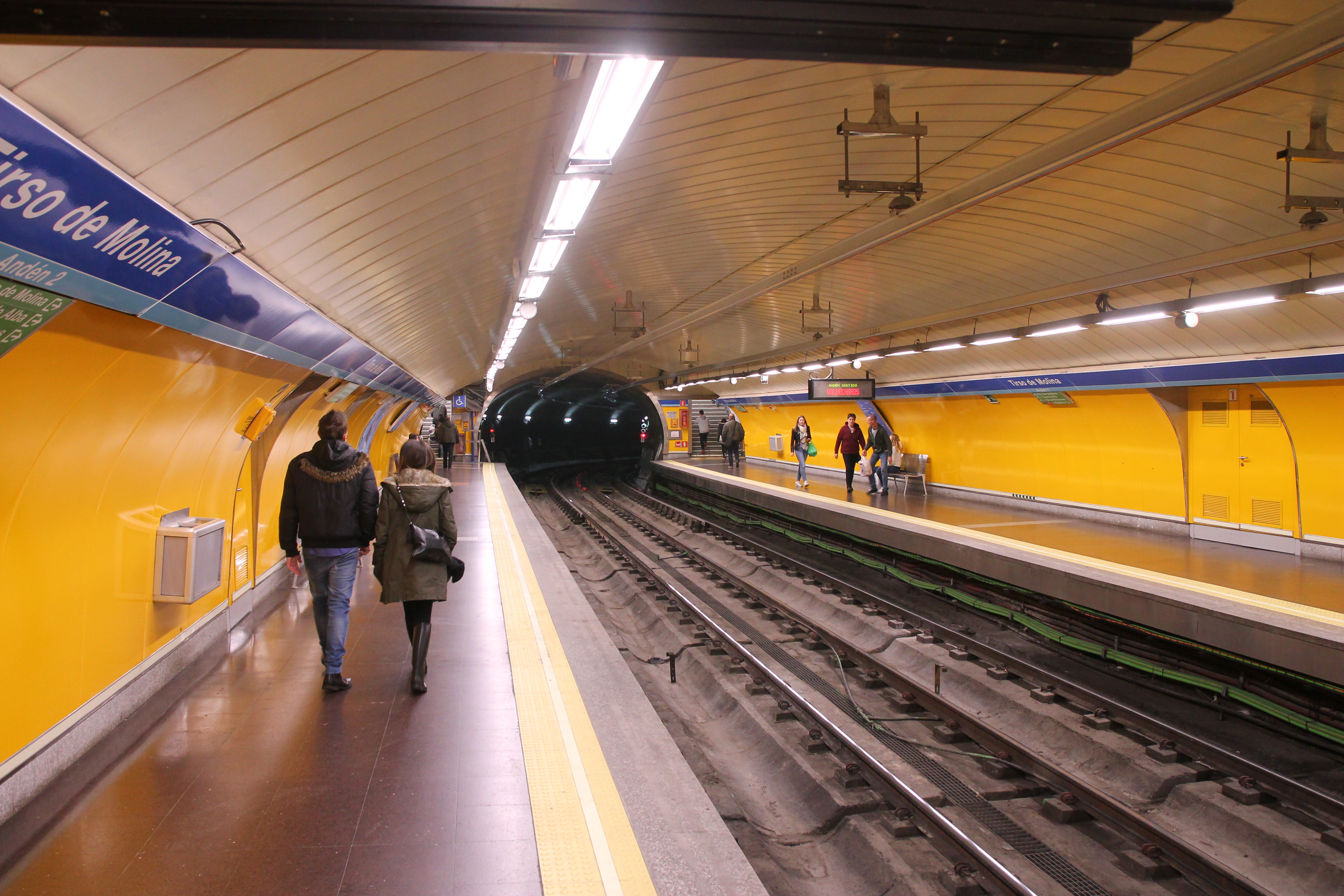

General information
- Location: Centro, Madrid; Spain
- Coordinates: 40.4123454°N 3.70466°W
- System: Madrid Metro station
- Owner: CRTM
- Operator: CRTM
- Tracks: 2

Construction
- Structure type: Underground
- Accessible: No

Other information
- Fare zone: A

History
- Opened: 26 December 1921; 104 years ago

Services
Preceding station	Madrid Metro	Following station
Sol towards Pinar de Chamartín	Line 1	Antón Martín towards Valdecarros
Location
- Location within Madrid

Tirso de Molina [ˈtiɾso ðe moˈlina] is a station on Line 1 of the Madrid Metro, located in Zone A, located at Plaza de Tirso de Molina. It has been open to the public since 26 December 1921. It is named in honour of the playwright, poet and friar Tirso de Molina (1583–1648).
