= Juan Genovés =

Spanish artist (1930–2020)

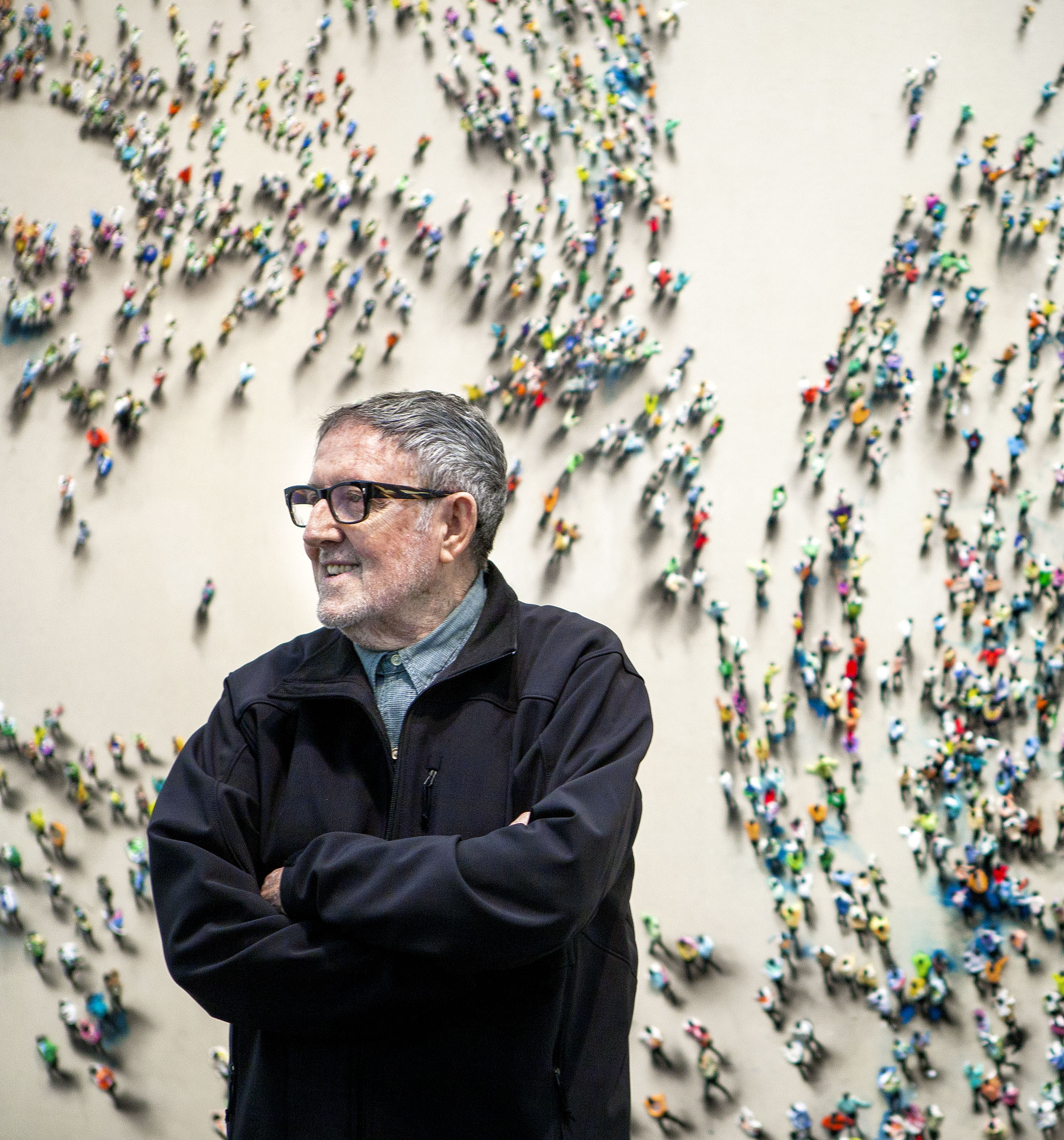
- Born: 31 May 1930; Valencia
- Died: 15 May 2020 (89 years old); Madrid (Spain)
- Education: San Carlos Royal Academy of Fine Art
- Known for: Painter & graphic artist
- Awards: •II Turia Awards •Spanish National Visual Arts Award (1984) •Gold Medal for Merit in Fine Arts (2005) Prize for Great Merit from the Valencian Regional Government (2016)
- Website: https://juangenoves.com/

Juan Genovés Candel (31 May 1930 – 15 May 2020) was a Spanish painter whose work is considered to symbolise the defence of democracy during the Spanish transition.

His work has been recognised domestically and internationally, forming part of museum collections and exhibitions across the world. He received the Honourable Mention at the 33rd Venice Biennale in 1966 and the Gold Medal for Merit in Fine Arts, given by Spain's Ministry of Culture, in 2005. His Estate is represented by Opera Gallery.

== Biography ==
Juan Genovés was born on 31 May 1930 at 17, Finlandia Street, Valencia, to working-class parents, Juan Genovés Cubells and María Candel Muñoz, from different backgrounds. His mother's family were practicing Catholics, while his father's had close links to the progressive left wing and worked in the UGT trade union's carpentry division. Political activism shaped his life and art, manifesting itself repeatedly throughout his life in his work.

The social and political upheavals in Spain during his childhood, which culminated in full-scale dictatorship, marked the painter's life and work. His first memories and experiences took place during the Civil War in Valencia, subject to bombings and one of the main battlegrounds of this armed conflict.

His first formal contact with painting was during night classes taken in the Industrial Engineering School's Artistic Metalworking department. Soon after, at a very early age, he started at the San Carlos Fine Arts school. But the stifling environment of Spanish society at that time prevented the flow of ideas and influences from abroad. As a result, Genovés found himself in an arts faculty that was stuck in the past, with teachers who defended the school of Sorolla and were set against anything to do with modern art. In contrast, Genovés was always critical of his surroundings and his teachers’ way of understanding art. This led him to connect with a small group of young visual artists, with whom he created the group Los Siete (1949–1954), who opposed narrow academic impositions.

Between 1957 and 1961 he began to create links with other artists, this time with the Parpalló Group, which was driven by a shared interest in renewing the language of plasticity; initially this group tended towards informalism, but soon each of its members started moving in different artistic directions and it was dissolved. Genovés did not find inspiration in the too-accommodating art encouraged in the faculty, nor in the artistic proposals made by others such as El Paso, a vanguard collective that had become better known in post-war Spain because its abstract language did not appear to challenge Franco's dictatorship. This led him to later set up the Hondo group (1960–1963) with whom he defended «new figurativism». This group saw pictorial work as being closely linked to the artist's civic and political stance. His works added to the social demands of the time in defence of the civil liberties that Spaniards had been denied by Franco's regime.

1965 marked a turning point in his career as a painter and his relationship with the dictatorship. His individual exhibition in the General Directorate of Fine Arts, currently the National Library in Madrid, was interpreted as a blatant provocation of the dictatorship, resulting in the curator, Pepe Escassi, losing his position there; Genovés was not offered an individual exhibition in a public institution until 1983. Nevertheless, he continued to take part in group exhibitions around the world and in 1968 created the Association of Plastic Artists, ASAP, clandestinely. During this period, together with another 80 artists, he locked himself up in the Prado Museum as a protest against the detention of the art critic Moreno Galván. It was also at this time that he attended the World Peace Congress as a member of the clandestine Spanish delegation, together with Saura, Bardem and Fernando Arrabal.

After Franco died, during the tumultuous period known as the Spanish Transition, Genovés expressed his political protest through murals, and as a Communist party member he remained in the anti-fascist struggle, together with other painters, creating images for a party which at this point was still illegal. His highly recognisable style and the communicative force of his works set him apart as a creator of some of the most iconic images in that period of Spain's history.

With the arrival of democracy, the way in which Genovés had expressed his militancy changed. The painter himself acknowledges a shift in his social action, when commenting during an interview that he had moved from political to cultural militancy. Between 1983 and 1995 he was part of the new Fine Arts Board in Madrid. In 1990 he created the VEGAP Association (Visual, Plastic Artists’ Management Entity), sitting on its board, and chairing it between 2007 and 2010.

Together with international recognition, which continues to this day, he received institutional acknowledgement in Spain. He received a lifetime achievement award from the Valencian Region, the Plastic Arts Prize [Premi de les Arts Plàstiques], the Gold Medal for Merit in Fine Arts [Medalla de Oro al Mérito en las Bellas Artes] and in 2010 Valencia's Cultural Action Award [Premio Acció Cultural].

Juan Genovés died on 15 May 2020 from natural causes, active to the end.

== Work ==
Despite his formal artistic education, Genovés distanced himself from the academic orthodoxy very early on. After briefly trying out several different styles, he moved steadily towards figurative painting. His work began to be defined in the sixties, because of his original way of uniting what he was representing and how he presented it. He uses a language that is strongly influenced by photography and film, reminiscent of North American pop art, with techniques involving aerosols, printing and stencils, to produce images that look as though they have been created by machine; thus, the artistic message runs through the entire work, not just in the mark of the brush. In other words, he gets sustenance from mass media and pop art in his manner of representing the objects that typify mass culture but walks away from the subjects portrayed by that culture. Herein lies the particular force of his work: the mixture between a language of mass communication, united with the dramatism of a political and social context. The priority for Genovés was to reflect turbulent social and political reality, not just the one in which Spain was immersed, but also what many other countries were suffering. Living through a dictatorship in his own country, active participant in strikes and demonstrations repressed by that dictatorship, he was witness and collector of images of civil conflicts taking place in Peru, Northern Ireland, the United States and Vietnam, among others. He upends into his work that entire aesthetic of fear and repression, giving us painting that is easy to access, with socially committed issues, worlds away from the fashionable informalism of the time.

"I had the impression that informalism put people off painting. That made me uncomfortable. To a certain extent I have always wanted to keep people close. I have always been worried about becoming a painter who is locked away in his studio, and that my work wouldn't reverberate or connect with others. The idea that what I was doing, however good it was, would only interest a handful of people was, and is, inconceivable to me, something approaching suicide. I have always wanted to be close to people, I have always looked for communication." Juan Genovés

His constant social commitment to portray those who were fighting Franco's dictatorship meant that he kept track of the historic development and consequences of the repression during the regime's second phase (1959–1975). Following his time with the Hondo group, the proponents of an expressionist neofigurativism which also borrowed procedures more associated with informalism, and after an extensive search for expression, he found his own style, becoming a crucial artist in the post-war Spanish vanguard. This shift links the art of Genovés to what has been termed Political Realism.

=== The Sixties ===
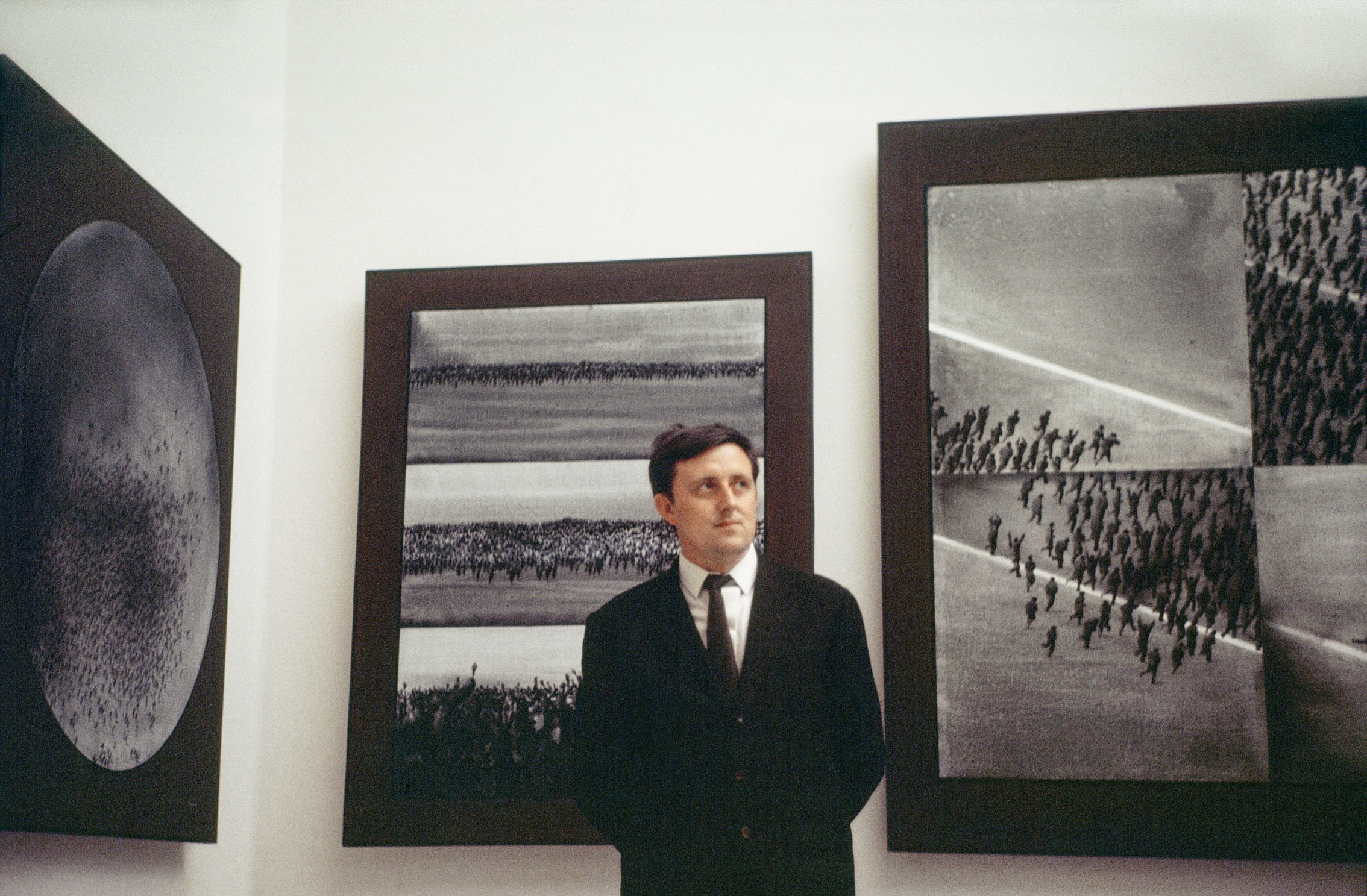
Juan Genovés in front of his work in 1966 when he represented Spain at the Venice Biennale

In this initial stage, the human shapes in his work begin to multiply and shrink, creating multitudes, sets of individuals who tell stories of terror, of flight, of war. His work focuses on the individual and the crowd, which lasts through nearly his whole production. Many of his images are made to look as though they have been taken with a long-distance lens, showing the dehumanisation in the dictatorship's exercise of oppression of society. In this decade he also participates in the Spanish Pavilion in the XXXIII Venice Biennale, where he received the Jury's Honourable Mention. This event became the start of his extensive international career, when he signed an exclusive contract with the Marlborough Gallery which would last his entire life. His fame abroad gives him a kind of double life until the end of the dictatorship. At the same time that he was exhibiting in Europe, Latin America and the United States, his life in Spain was one of fear and repression. Pieces such as El objetivo (The Objective) reveal this concern, with a representation of a fleeing mass, in the focus of a long-distance lens or the barrel of a weapon. In others he uses elements of cinema narration, parallel language and alternating planes. His use of muted tones, sepias and greys adds to the tension and horror that Genovés presents. Nevertheless, he also created pictures such as Uno, dos, siete, siete [One, two, seven, seven] (1968), Tres círculos [Three circles] (1969) and La diana [The bullseye] (1969) in which he engages in a dialogue with pop art in its most popular iteration, in terms of the sequential layout and, in turn, in his use of vivid colours, even though they never fail to add to that atmosphere of gravity that characterises his work.

The study of crowds begins to develop in this first phase of his work. We should note here that his crowds, generally seen from above, are made up of individuals, they are not a homogeneous mass; rather he presents a duality between the group and the individual. They contain or suggest opposing binaries such as freedom and alienation, solitude and community, conformity and disconformity, and so on. Furthermore, the mass is made up of characters that are points of attention; this is how the author plays with the attraction, repulsion and groupings among them.

=== The Seventies ===
There was a change of perspective in his work during this decade. Genovés grounds our gaze, bringing the viewer face to face with individual aggressions. The individuals, now bigger and treated in a hyperrealist manner, are superimposed on white backgrounds, figures with spot colours, whose purpose is direct communication, devoid of flourishes. One of the painter's most popular pictures belongs to this period, El Abrazo [The Hug] (1976), which was used for a poster that the anti-Franco platform, the Democratic Board had commissioned him to make clandestinely. The poster's purpose was to demand amnesty for the political prisoners of Franco's dictatorship. This would cost him 7 days behind bars. Although the first print run was confiscated by the police, five hundred thousand posters were printed and became hugely popular, with the work coming to represent the reconciliation and closure that it was hoped Spanish society would achieve during the democratic transition. In 2003 the painter was asked to adapt the work to create a bronze monument in tribute to the lawyers murdered on Madrid's Atocha Street, which can be seen today in Antón Martín Square. After going into a private North American collection, the original returned to the now-defunct Madrid Contemporary Art Museum, later continuing its journey to the Reina Sofia Art Museum collection. After many years in its vaults, it saw the light again in 2016, when it was exhibited in the Congress of Deputies’ Constitution Room, staying there until 2018 when it was included in the collective exhibition The Poetics of Democracy: Images and Counter-Images from the Transition, in the Reina Sofía Museum. The painting is currently in storage once again.

=== The Eighties and Nineties ===
A sign of the continued dialogue between the work of Genovés and the historical events in the country is the Paisajes Urbanos [Urban Landscapes] series that he created in the Eighties. The failed coup d’état took place on 23rd February 1981, leaving behind a deep feeling of disquiet about the political and social fragility of the time. The works in this series are mostly empty of human life; they show deserted, nocturnal cities to convey the desolation and anguish felt across the country as a result of the new atmosphere. The painter furnishes these nearly empty streets and solitary buildings with a colour palate of greys, blues and ochres, giving greater dramatism to the fear that had returned to permeate everything. At this moment the human figures play a secondary role and the setting takes on more importance than in the rest of his oeuvre.

The nineties see a period of synthesis in the work of Genovés, with the reappearance of crowds, this time made up of small figures always painted in blacks and greys which the light causes to reflect elongated shadows, creating the illusion of superimposition over wide empty white spaces. Crossing this space sparkles and coloured shapes appear that in relation to the crowds reflect on the trends of movement, freedom, the limits of space. Sometimes, the intense colour shapes might remind one of the shock wave of an explosion, repelling the figures; at other times, however, they are attractive points of light or lines indicating direction.

=== 2000 onwards ===
In these two final decades, Genovés continued working with figures that relate with one another forming scattered groups. His gaze has risen to take in perspective, going beyond local situations and observing contemporary dynamics in their broader context. This marks a change in his work, as the surroundings are undergoing constant change. Bringing together abstraction and figurativism, his spaces and figures are full of colour and texture, each figure represented is different and is going in a different direction, a reflection of contemporary societies. Now the individuals not only flee repression during a march, but congregate in shopping malls, on beaches, are held back by a huge frontier wall or are just disorientated and don't know where they are coming from or where they are going. An example of this is Linde [Boundary], which shows a canvas divided by an abrupt red line, where the crowd represents an uncomfortable tension in its attraction towards that strip, but at the same time submissively obeys and does not cross. Looking at the canvas, a repressive power that questions the existence of free will is palpable.

The well-known art historian Francisco Calvo Serraller commented: "All of Genovés is in the most recent Genovés, except the fact that aesthetic of the image offers a greater paradoxical moral force, because it better dramatizes the absence of human refuge, intensifies the absurd, the disorientation, and makes the fragility more palpable and urgent".

In this final period, Genovés continued to make a contribution to the debate on the reality surrounding him, bringing his own perspective, that as spectators immersed in the crowd it is difficult to discern. His work's artistic, political and social content is transmitted by his investigation of pictorial language, the image's static movement, visual rhythm and the use of contrast between the backdrop and the figure.

== Collections and museums ==
- Spain

AENA, Madrid
Asamblea de Madrid
Centro Cultural Internacional Oscar Niemeyer, Avilés
Colección Amigos del Centro de Arte Reina Sofía, Madrid
Colección Argentaria, Madrid
Colección de Arte del Siglo XX, Alicante
Colección Bancaixa, Valencia
Colección La Caixa, Barcelona
Colección Caixa d`Estalvis, Valencia
Colección Caja Madrid, Madrid
Colección Caja Murcia
Colección Generalitat Valenciana, Valencia
Colección Iberdrola
Congreso de los Diputados, Madrid
Fundación Juan March, Madrid
Fundación Aena
Instituto Valenciano de Arte Moderno, Valencia (IVAM)
Instituto Cultural Juan Gil Albert, Alicante
Museo Municipal, Madrid
Museo de Bellas Artes de Álava
Museo de Bellas Artes de Valencia
Museo de Arte Contemporáneo de Vilafamés, Castellón
Museu d'Elx
Museo del Ayuntamiento de Valencia
Museo de Cuenca
Museo de Arte Contemporáneo de Ayllón, Segovia
Museo de Arte Contemporáneo de Cáceres
Museo de Arte Contemporáneo Patio Herreriano, Valladolid
Museo d`Art Contemporany dels Països Catalans, Bañolas
Museo de Arte Contemporáneo Unión Fenosa, La Coruña
Museo Nacional Centro de Arte Reina Sofía, Madrid
Museo de Santa Cruz, de Toledo
Museo Vasco de Arte Contemporáneo (Artium), Vitoria.
Palacio de la Moncloa, Madrid
Patrimonio Nacional del Estado español, Madrid
Fundación Caja de Granada

- Europe

Nationalgalerie, Staatlische Museen de Berlín
Neue Galerie der Stadt, Aquisgrán
Kulturministerium Badem-Württemberg, Stuttgart
Museum fur Moderne Kunst, Fráncfort del Meno
Museum Modern Kunst, Vienna
Musée Royaux des Beaux-Arts de Belgique, Bruselas
Taidehalle Ateneum, Helsinki
Centre National d`Art Contemporain, París
Museum Boymans-van Beuningen, Róterdam
Sainsbury Center for the Visual Arts, Norwich
Galleria Nazionale d'Arte Moderna, Roma
Muzeum Lódz
Muzeum Narodowum, Wroclawiu
Collezione Thyssen-Bornemisza, Castagnola

- North America

Montreal Museum of Fine Arts
Arkansas Arts Center, MacArthur Park, Little Rock, Arkansas
Museum of Modern Art (MOMA), New York
Guggenheim Museum, New York
Chase Manhattan Bank, New York
The Art Institute of Chicago
Hirshhorn Museum and Sculpture Garden, Washington
The Philips Industries Collection, Dayton, Ohio
Andrew Dixon White Museum, Ithaca
Minneapolis Institute of Arts (MIA)
Worcester Art Museum
The Nelson-Atkins Museum of Art, Missouri
Ohio University College of Fine Arts, Athens
Madison Art Center, Madison, Wisconsin

- Latin America

Museo de Arte Moderno de Río de Janeiro
Museo de la Solidaridad Salvador Allende, Santiago de Chile.
Museo de Arte Moderno de Bogotá
Museo Nacional de Bellas Artes de La Habana
Museo de Arte Moderno de México
Museo Rufino Tamayo, Ciudad de México
Museo de Arte Contemporáneo, Managua
Museo Itinerante
Museo de Bellas Artes de Caracas

- Africa

South African National Gallery, Ciudad del Cabo
Museo de Arte de Pretoria
Museo Internacional Arte Contemporáneo, Guinea

- Australia

Power Gallerie of Contemporary Art, Sídney

- Asia

The Israel Museum, Jerusalem
Museo de Arte, Nagasaki

== Work in public spaces ==
- 2003: El Abrazo.(The Hug). Plaza de Antón Martín. Ayuntamiento de Madrid.

== Awards ==
- 1950: Medalla de Oro, IX Exposición Arte Universitario, Valencia
- 1950: Primer Premio Nacional del SEU; Exposición Arte Universitario, Madrid
- 1951: Pensionado de 2 años de la Diputación Provincial de Valencia en la especialidad de <Figura>;
- Beca de Pintura (Paisaje) Residencia Oficial "El Paular" y Segovia; Escuela Superior de Bellas Artes de San Carlos de Valencia;
- 1953: Primer Premio de Pintura; X Exposición Nacional del Frente de Juventudes, Círculo de Bellas Artes, Madrid: Taller de ceramistas
- 1953: Medalla conmemorativa; seleccionado a partir de la II Bienal del Reino de Valencia para la Bienal Hispanoamericana; Instituto Iberoamericano de Valencia: Mercadillo
- 1954: Medalla de Plata; III Concurso Nacional de Pintura, Alicante
- 1955: Medalla de Plata; IV Concurso Nacional de Pintura Diputación Provincial de Alicante
- 1955: Primer Premio; Concurso "Norteamérica vista por pintores españoles", Casa Americana de Valencia: En cada puerto...
- 1955: Primer Premio; XV Salón del Círculo de Bellas Artes, Madrid
- 1956: Premio; II Bienal de Barcelona: Tiovivo (1953)
- 1966: Mención de Honor; XXXIII Bienal de Venecia
- 1967: Medalla de Oro; VI Biennale Internazionale d'Arte República San Marino, sección "L'immagine fotográfica": Agrupamiento
- 1968: Premio Internazionale Marzotto
- 1984: Premio Nacional de Artes Plásticas, Ministerio de Cultura de España
- 2001: Mejor Individual de Artista Extranjero en el año 2000 por "Secuencias y Sueños" presentada en el Museo de Arte Moderno; ADCA, Asociación Dominicana de Críticos de Arte, Inc.
- 2002: Artista Invitado a Premios Vadepeñas 2000; Centro Cultural Cecilio Miñoz. Fillol, Valdepeñas, Ciudad Real.
- 2002: Premio de las Artes Plásticas de la Generalitat Valenciana.
- 2005: Medalla de Oro al Mérito en las Bellas Artes, Ministerio de Cultura de España.
- 2016: Alta Distinción y Gran Cruz de la Orden de Jaime I el Conquistador de la Generaliat Valenciana.
