= Asociación de Víctimas del Terrorismo =

Spanish organization

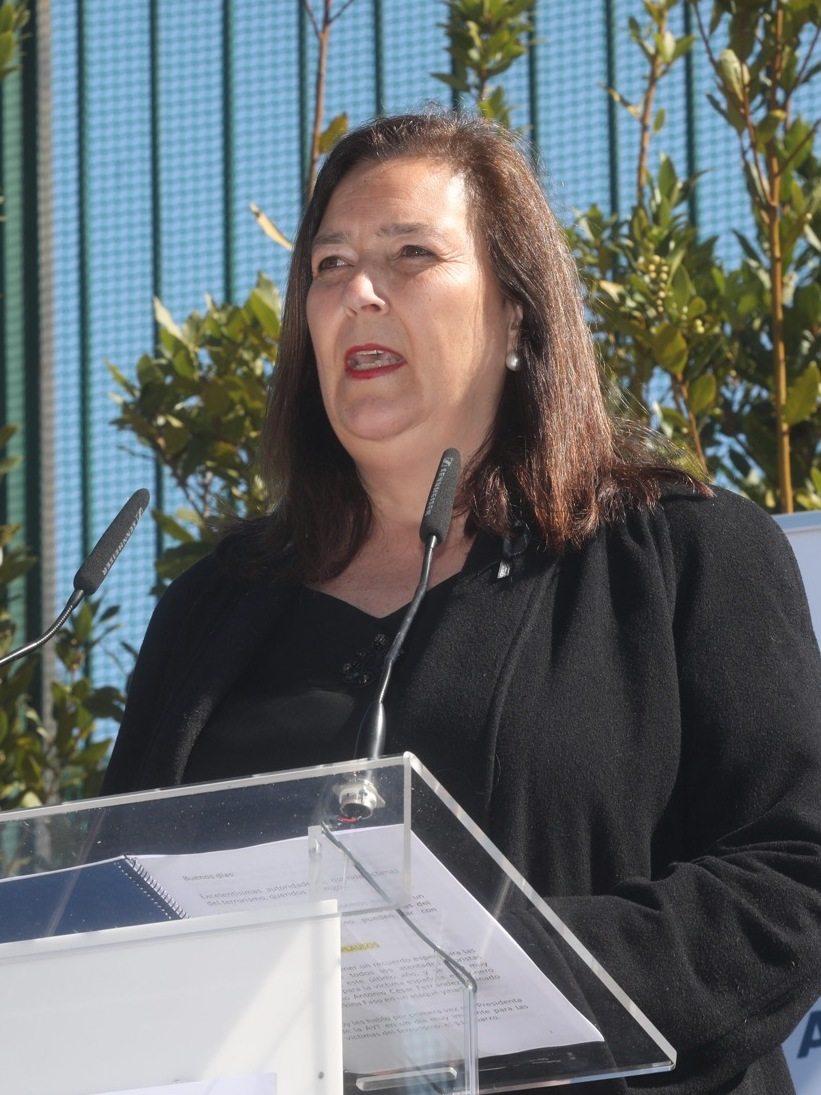
Maite Araluce, president of the Association of Victims of Terrorism (2016).

The Association of Victims of Terrorism (Spanish: Asociación de Víctimas del Terrorismo, AVT) is a Spanish association created in 1981 by victims of terrorist attacks. Its members include those injured by ETA, GRAPO, the Provisional Irish Republican Army and Al Qaeda, as well as their families. Its membership exceeds 6,000.

Its current president is Maite Araluce, the daughter of José María Araluce Villar, president of the Provincial Assembly of Gipuzkoa and member of the Council of the Realm, assassinated by ETA in 1976.

During the presidency of Jose Maria Aznar, the AVT advocated political positions criticised as extreme, including conspiracy theories regarding the Madrid train bombings. This led to the creation of other terror victims' associations with less divisive political agendas.

This association promoted a campaign against other Basque nationalist organisations, such as the political party Batasuna, Jarrai or Gestoras pro Amnistía, as well as music groups such as Su Ta Gar that it accuses of supporting Basque terrorism.

== 11 March 2004 train bombings ==
On 11 March 2004, a series of rush hour explosions in several Madrid train stations left 192 dead and some 1,900 wounded.

AVT expressed doubts about the conclusion reached by the Spanish judiciary. Specifically, the AVT asked why no pictures of the alleged perpetrators were found, unlike in the 7 July 2005 London bombings, and why the type of explosives used remains unknown. The association also questioned the relationship between the alleged perpetrators and the National Police Corps of Spain and Guardia Civil.

== Related groups ==
Other associations of ETA victims include COVITE (Colectivo de Víctimas del Terrorismo / Victims of Terrorism Group), representing victims from the Basque Country itself.

Other victim associations from the 11 March attacks include the Asociación Afectados de Terrorismo, headed by Pilar Manjón. This association does not share the AVT's viewpoints on the attacks.
