= Antón Martín (Madrid Metro) =

Madrid Metro station

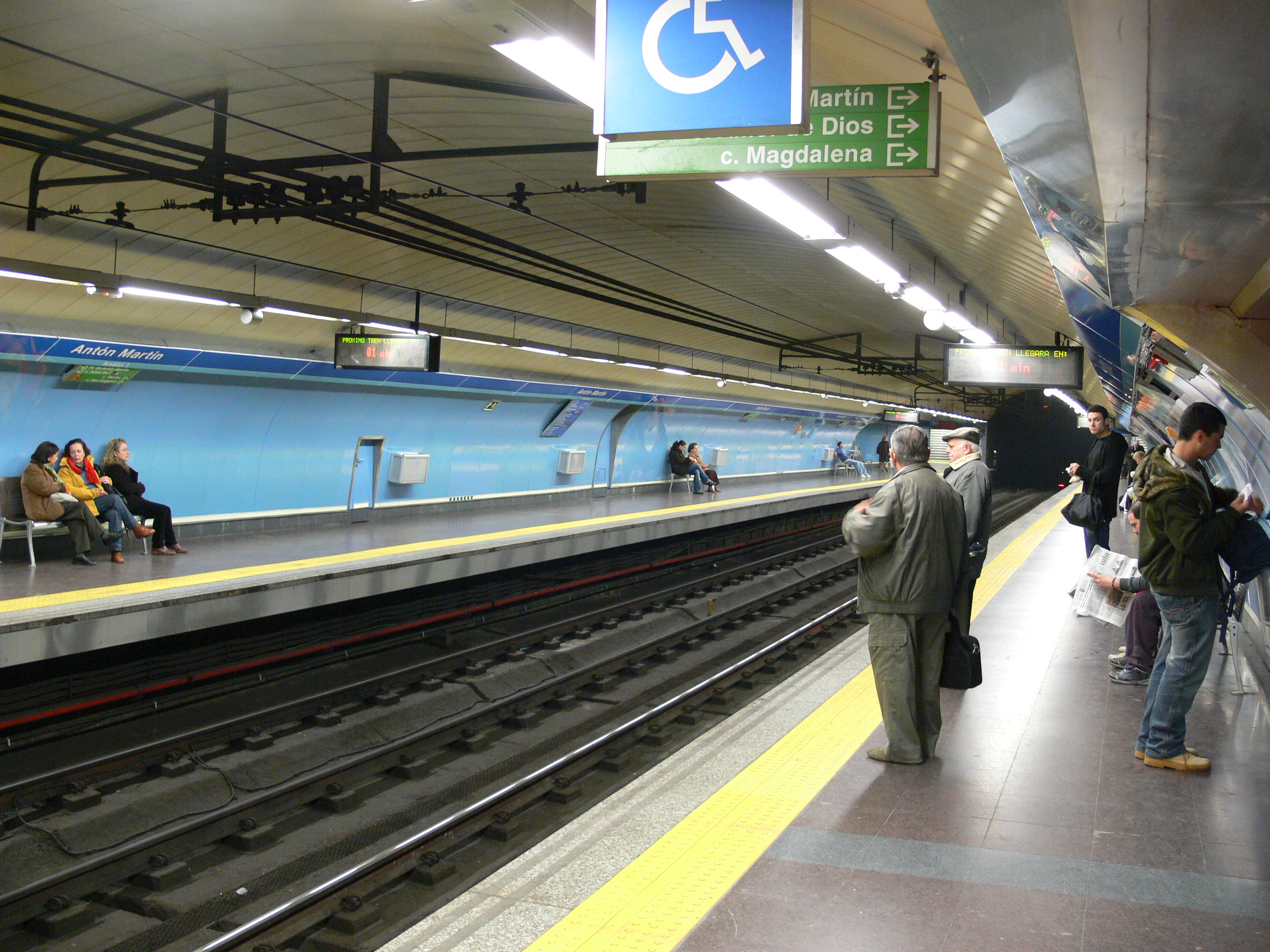

General information
- Location: Centro, Madrid; Spain
- Coordinates: 40.4124676°N 3.6993693°W
- System: Madrid Metro station
- Owner: CRTM
- Operator: CRTM

Construction
- Structure type: Underground
- Accessible: No

Other information
- Fare zone: A

History
- Opened: 26 December 1921; 104 years ago

Services
Preceding station	Madrid Metro	Following station
Tirso de Molina towards Pinar de Chamartín	Line 1	Estación del Arte towards Valdecarros
Location
- Location within Madrid

Antón Martín [anˈtom maɾˈtin] is a station on Line 1 of the Madrid Metro. It is located in Fare Zone A and has been open to the public since 26 December 1921. The station is named for Antón Martín (1500–1553) of the Knights Hospitaller, who founded the nearby Hospital de San Juan de Dios.
