= TEDAX =

Spanish bomb disposal units

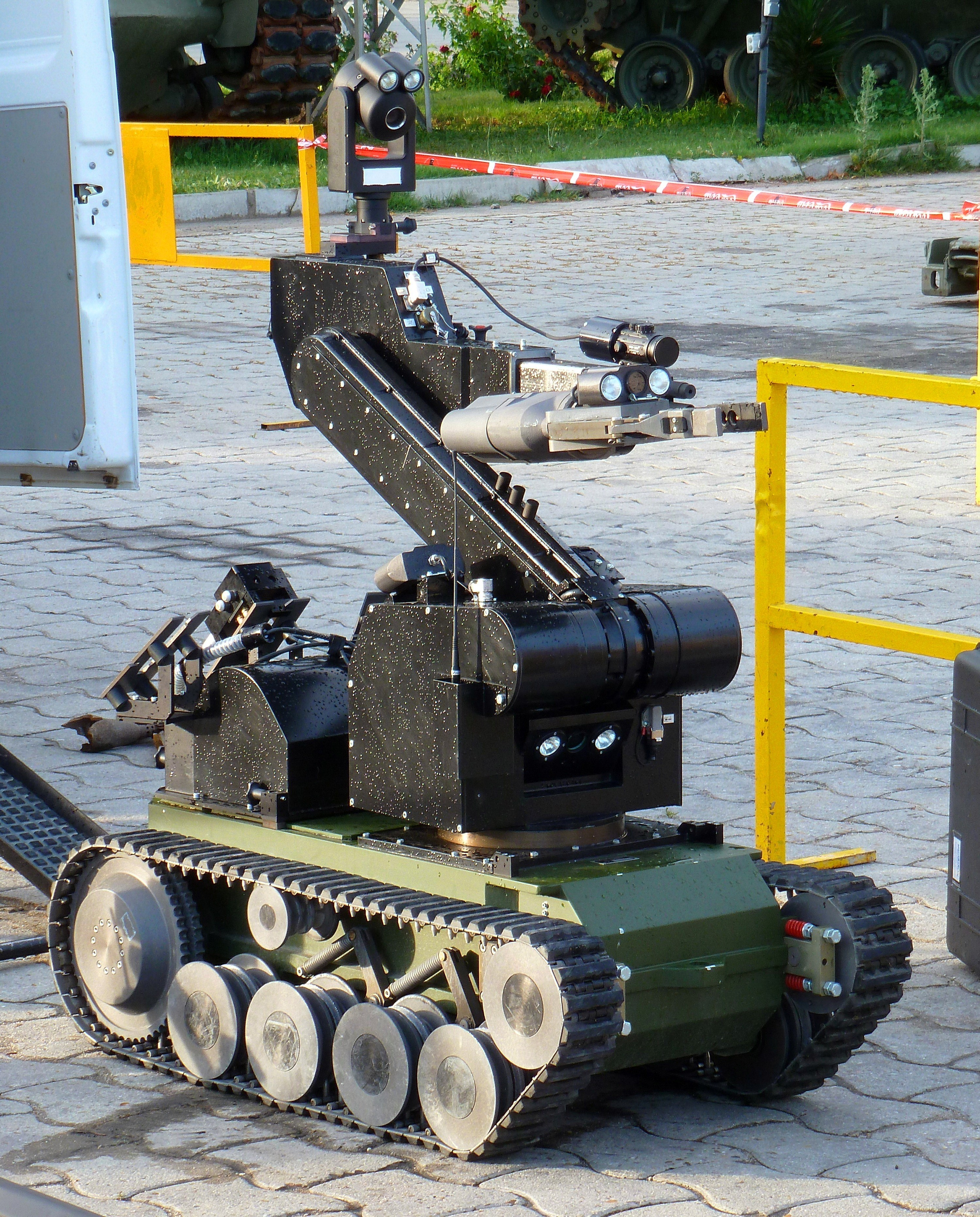
Bomb disposal robot Telerob tEODor of the Spanish Army

Technician Specialist in Deactivation of Explosive Artifacts (Spanish: Técnico Especialista en Desactivación de Artefactos Explosivos), commonly known by its abbreviation TEDAX, is the Spanish name for bomb disposal units.

Many TEDAX groups exist in Spain, most of them in the police corps but also in the Armed Forces (but they changed their name in 2001). Since 2001, these units of the Armed Forces are not named TEDAX because they are adapted to the international standards of EOD (Explosive Ordnance Disposal) due to the entry of Spain in NATO. Other reason to change the name was because of these groups are also specialized on unexploded ordnance.

The TEDAX of the law enforcement agencies and the EODs of the Armed Forces have become a key element in the fight against terrorism, each in its area of competence. For the performance of their function they have the support of technology of specific design, like specialized robots, explosive resistant suits, etc.

In Spain there are TEDAX units in the Civil Guard, in the National Police Corps and in some Autonomous Police (like Mossos d'Esquadra or Ertzaintza), and there are EOD Units in the Army, in the Air Force and in the Navy.

The TEDAX units were created in the 1970s and they were fundamental to the fight against the terrorist group ETA and in the 2004 Madrid train bombings. Outside the national territory, EOD units have become essential parts of the international operations carried out by the Spanish Armed Forces around the world, in areas where the threat of artifacts and ammunition is very high. These units are also specialized in CBRN defense.

The first victim of the TEDAX police units, Rafael Valdenebro Sotelo, died in 1978 when he tried to deactivate an explosive device attributed to the Canary Islands Independence Movement. Many other victims of the police units were killed trying to defuse ETA bombs. In the Armed Forces, the first victim was Captain Fernando Álvarez Rodríguez, died in 1993 in Bosnia and Herzegovina.

Emblem of the TEDAX of the Civil Guard

Emblem of the TEDAX-NRBQ of the National Police Corps

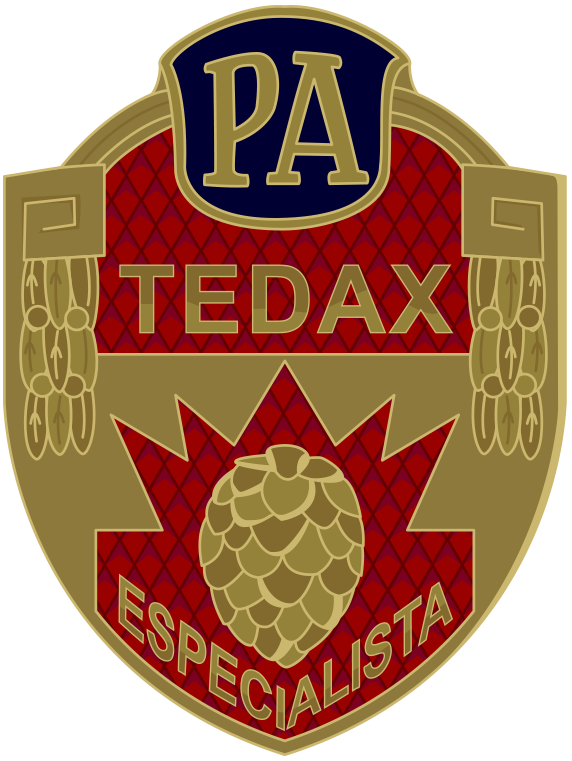
Emblem of the TEDAX of the Armed Police Corps (Dissolved)
