= Juan del Olmo =

Juan del Olmo (born 1958) is a Spanish judge in the 2004 Madrid train bombings case. In 2003, he ordered that the Euskaldunon Egunkaria newspaper be closed on grounds of accusations driven by a "narrow and erroneous view according to which everything that has to do with the Basque language and with culture in that language is promoted and/or controlled by ETA", as determined seven years after by a sentence of the Criminal Court of the Audiencia Nacional of Spain.
