= Titadine =

Titadyn 30 AG (often referred to as Titadine) is a type of compressed dynamite used in mining and manufactured in southern France by Titanite S.A. The explosive comes in the form of salmon-coloured tubes of a range of diameters, from 50 to 120 mm. Titadine is very powerful and fast-burning, with an energy rating of 4650 J/g and a speed of detonation of over 6,000 m/s.

It was used in bomb attacks by the separatist group ETA in Spain. In September 1999 a combined group of ETA members and Breton separatists raided a factory at Plevin, Brittany, stealing over eight tonnes of Titadyn, some of which was subsequently sold to the Islamist resistance group Hamas, according to Spain's El Mundo newspaper. Another raid took place in March 2001 when an explosives factory near Grenoble in France was targeted and 1.6 tonnes of Titadyn was stolen. Much of it was later recovered by Spanish police in raids, or was used by ETA in car bomb attacks in Spanish cities.
