= Goma-2 =

Type of high explosive

Goma-2 was a type of high explosive manufactured for industrial use (chiefly mining) by Unión Española de Explosivos S.A.

It was a gelatinous, nitroglycol-based explosive widely used within Spain and exported abroad. It was used by ETA in the 1980s and 1990s.

There were two variants of Goma-2: Goma-2 EC and Goma-2 ECO. As of 2017, the manufacturer MAXAM Corp. S. L. has reformulated the Goma-type ammonia gelatine dynamites which are marketed worldwide under the new Riodin trade name.

== Properties ==
Goma-2 explosive was a mixture of several chemicals:

- Ammonium nitrate - 60–70%
- Nitroglycol - 26–34%
- Nitrocellulose - 0.5–2%
- Dibutyl phthalate - 1–3%
- Fuels - 1–3%

As with other commercial blasting explosives, detonators were needed to initiate a detonation (usually a blasting cap # 8).

== Terrorist use ==
Goma-2 ECO was the explosive that was used in the 2004 Madrid train bombings. Terrorist Jamal Ahmidan, also known as El Chino, bought the explosive illegally from a mine in northern Spain. It was also planned by the same cell that carried out the Madrid bombings to use the explosive to derail a high-speed train. In 1973, about 80 kilograms of the explosive was used by ETA in Operation Ogro to assassinate Luis Carrero Blanco. The explosion was so powerful it threw Blanco's car over a five story building.
