= Barcelona attack =

Barcelona attack may refer to:

- 1938: Bombing of Barcelona, a series of airstrikes in the Spanish Civil War
- 1987: Hipercor bombing, by Basque separatists ETA
- 1987: Bar Iruna attack, attack on Americans by Catalan separatists
- 1990: Sabadell bombing, by ETA
- 1991: Vic bombing, by ETA
- 2015: Barcelona school killing by a 13-year-old boy
- 2017: 2017 Barcelona attacks, a van-ramming attack into people on La Rambla by jihadists
