= Terra Lliure =

Catalan pro-independence paramilitary group

- Terra Lliure's symbol
- Leaders: Jaume Fernàndez; Montserrat Tarragó; Carles Sastre
- Dates active: 1978-1995: 1979 (start of operations); 1985 (arrest of major leaders); 1991 (ceasefire); 1992 (Operation Garzón); 1995 (dissolution)
- Split from: PSAN
- Country: Spain
- Group: MDT (political wing)
- Active regions: Catalonia
- Ideology: Revolutionary socialism; Catalan nationalism; Catalan independence; Marxism-Leninism; Factions: Liberation theology; Anarcho-syndicalism; Anarcho-communism
- Political position: Far-left

Terra Lliure (Eastern Catalan: [ˈtɛrə ˈʎiwɾə], "Free Land"), sometimes referred to as TLL, was a far-left, Marxist-Leninist, and separatist paramilitary group active in Catalonia, Spain. Formed in 1978, the group carried out hundreds of attacks, leaving many people injured and five dead (four of them members of the organization while handling explosive devices in three separate incidents).

Terra Lliure, became known to the public with a protest at a mass meeting at the Camp Nou stadium in Barcelona in 1981. An important police raid in 1991 and the renunciation of violence by some of the group members led to the dissolution of Terra Lliure in 1995. After disbanding, many members joined the political party Republican Left of Catalonia. During the most active period of its activity it was considered a terrorist organization by Spanish and European courts, Spanish press, and at least parts of the Catalan press.

== Ideology ==
Terra Lliure was described as a Marxist, nationalist and a separatist organization that sought to establish an independent Catalan state. Founded during the period of Spanish transition to democracy, Terra Lliure decried what it considered to be a persistence of anti-Catalan discrimination and state violence. It was placed on the far-left fringe of Catalan political forces and sought to be an imitation of Basque Euskadi Ta Askatasuna and became a bridge between Catalan anarchists and nationalists. In its 1981 Declaration of Principles, Terra Lliure described itself as a movement that "fights to defend the land, the language, national sovereignty, the interests of workers and against the Spanishization of Catalan society".

Similarly to Basque ETA, Terra Lliure was also influenced by the far-left liberation theology and had a faction directly dedicated to it. This is in line with the Basque ETA that Terra Lliure aspired to become a Catalan equivalent of; ETA was founded in the Benedictine seminary in Lazkao and was supported by Basque clergy, which harboured separatist and nationalist tendencies, especially at local level. Pro-ETA Basque priests accepted violent actions of ETA, considering it justified as part of the oppressed people's aspiration for freedom and independence. One of the most prominent supporters of ETA amongst the Basque clergy was José María Setién, the Archbishop of San Sebastián. In case of Catalonia, despite the fact that Catalonia was a heavily anti-clerical nation prior to WW2, the nationalist movement became increasingly "Catholicized" between 1940s and 1960s, as the Catholic Church became the only institution that the Francoist regime was unable to persecute for its usage and promotion of the Catalan language. Following Vatican II, Catalan clergy would increasingly emerge as a vocal opponent of the Francoist regime, and many parishes provided refugee and aid to anti-Francoist groups. In 1963, Catalan abbot Aureli Maria Escarré went as far as arguing that the Francoist regime "does not obey the basic principles of Christianity". The commitment of the Catholic Church to preserve the Catalan language and aid anti-Francoist resistance earned the respect of Catalan Communists who abandoned the traditional Catalan anti-clericalism and instead "began to see the Church as a potential ally". Terra Lliure sought to continue the link between Catalan socialists and the Catholic clergy, seeing the post-Francoist Spain as merely a continuation of Francoism and its repressive structures.

Politically, Terra Lliure emerged from a split in the Socialist Party of National Liberation (Catalan: Partit Socialista d’Alliberament Nacional dels Països Catalans, PSAN), a pro-independence party with a Marxist-Leninist ideology created in 1969 and based in Catalonia and the Valencian Community, and the Independentists of the Catalan Countries (Catalan: Independentistes dels Països Catalans, IPC) party, which emerged in Catalonia and was the result of a split in the PSAN in 1979. In July 1984, the Movement for Defence of the Land (Catalan: Moviment de Defensa de la Terra, MDT) was formed, another Catalan pro-independence left-wing party that integrated these two parties and became the political arm of Terra Lliure. Terra Lliure's objectives, made explicit and explained in its internal bulletins called Alerta, were: independence, socialism and the reunification of the "Països Catalans", a cultural entity comprising the Principality of Catalonia, the Valencian Country, the Balearic Islands, as well as its bordering areas (the so-called Catalunya Nord to the north and the Franja to the west). Terra Lliure argued that only Catalan independence can protect its culture and bring about socialism, while rejecting autonomismo (autonomism) and sucursalismo ("sectionalism", a regional political party's dependence on the central party).

Despite calling for "Països Catalans", Terra Lliure envisioned that Greater Catalonia would be further separated, either through federalization or subsequent separatism, into regions "with different languages", with the Valencian language being cited as an example. According to Terra Lliure, these languages were forced to communicate in Spanish, and Spanish assimilationist policies resulted in fragmentation of Catalan society, where the "Catalan working people" (poble treballador català) were now alienated in their own homeland by privileged Spanish speakers. In its program, Terra Lliure also decried the decline of traditional Catalan industries, environmental destruction, and state-sanctioned repression. Through this, the organization also had protectionist, environmentalist and anarchist overtones (with anarchism being represented by some of the factions within Terra Lliure). It also called for the defence of Catalan territory, language and national sovereignty from espanyolistas and anti-nationalist, along with "protecting the interests of workers" against "the forces of occupation".

In a 1982 letter released by Terra Lliure, the organization wrote: "Ever since the French and Spanish states conquered the Països Catalans, we have walked towards our destruction as a people." Terra Lliure described Catalonia as "subject to continued aggression from the Spanish and French oligarchies and the regional bourgeoise, that endanger everything that constitutes our national heritage: land, work, language, customs. Not only do they call into question our national identity, but also our survival as [the] people who [make up] Catalan society." Terra Lliure argued that class and national liberation were inextricable from each other and could only be achieved through armed struggle. The party accused Spain of "attempted annihilation of the Catalan nation" and warned of the loss of national consciousness and replacement of Catalan cultures through the hegemonic culture of Spain. It warned that disappearance of Catala language from public use meant that the "Catalan culture was reduced to catacombs". Terra Lliure also argued that democratized Spain continues "attempts at cultural and national genocide" and stated its belief that the prevalence of Spanish language in Catalonia must be prevented and fought against, writing: "We do not accept the existence of two communities or two languages as a perpetual fact, as this can only lead to the disappearance of our language and our community and to an artificial division of our working people."

== History ==
In the 1960s, a new generation of anti-Franco activists reshaped Catalanism and separatism. In 1968, the Socialist Party of National Liberation (Catalan: Partit Socialista d’Alliberament Nacional dels Països Catalans, PSAN) was founded, which combined Marxist revolutionary ideology with Catalan separatism. PSAN took anti-colonial struggles and third-world anti-imperialist nationalism as its model for Catalan separatism. The party grew increasingly divided during the Spanish transition of democracy, with many left-wing radical, revolutional socialist, but also moderate and reformist currents emerging. Terra Liure was founded in 1978 by a small faction of PSAN that endorsed violent tactics despite the end of Francoism, arguing that a "symbolic" damage is necessary in order to assist and bring about national and class liberation.

As small Catalan terrorist cells coalesced around Terra Liure and started its activities in 1979, the movement struggled with lack of support and popularity as the sociopolitical conditions were no longer favorable to violent tactics. The exiled regional government of Catalonia officially returned in late 1977 and was the transitional Catalan government until the 1980 Catalan regional election. Unlike in Basque Country, in Catalonia voters overwhelmingly approved of the new constitution in 1978, with 61% voting in favour with a turnout of 68% - in comparison, only 31% of Basque voters voted in favour with a turnout of 45%. The 1979 Spanish local elections showed that the Catalan movement had great potential to become a powerful force in Spanish politics and take power in the upcoming regional elections, leading many Catalan nationalists to embrace reformist and Spanish democracy. The Catalan statute of autonomy also proved popular, with 53% of voters supporting it in October 1979 (with a 60% turnout).

In the 1980 Catalan elections, the centrist Convergence and Union (CiU) unexpectedly won with 28% of the vote, ahead of the socialist PSC and communist PSUC. This allowed Terra Lliure to gain some support for its tactics and to escalate violence as radical nationalists grew disillusioned with CiU governments, resulting in some support for terrorism. The foundation of the Movement for Defence of the Land in 1984 marked the best period in the history of Terra Lliure, as a known political front and terrorist organization shifted towards more radical actions. The organization was then severely weakened in late 1985 as its leadership was arrested and its political front suffered splits along strategic issue. The separatist Republican Left of Catalonia (Catalan: Esquerra Republicana de Catalunya, ERC) also attracted the members of Terra Lliure into its ranks by negotiationg individual solutions for jailed activists, resulting in separatist voters and militants embracing ERC, which became the third largest party in Catalan parliament.

In May 1981, Terra Lliure kidnapped Spanish cultural activist and teacher Federico Jiménez Losantos who helped organizing and then signed the Manifesto of the 2,300, which decried legal protections given to the Catalan language. The manifesto alleged that Spanish speakers are discriminated against in Catalonia, and warned against "Catalanization" of Catalan schools and public spaces. After verifying his identity and locating him, Terra Lliure members tied Jiménez to a tree and shot him in the knee, but allowed him to be rescued. Terra Lliure called their attack a "retaliation for activities against the Catalan language".

Despite struggling to gain widespread approval for its radical militancy amongst the Catalan public before, Terra Lliure's attack on Jiménez was not met with outrage as the overwhelming majority of Catalans were strongly critical of the Manifesto of the 2,300 signed and organized by Jiménez. The Catalan public vehemently rejected the claim that Spanish speakers were discriminated against, and Catalan newspapers unanimously condemned the manifesto. The University of Barcelona organized a counter-declaration "in defense of the Catalan language, culture, and nation", which was endorsed by over 1300 Catalan institutions and voluntary associations. This sparked the foundation of a Catalan organization Crida a la Solidaritat en Defensa de la Llengua which organized a rally at Camp Nou in June 1981, with the slogan “Som una nació” (Catalan: We are a nation). The rally had around 100,000 attenders and sparked a political and cultural movement in favor of Catalanization and Catalan autonomy, and against Spanish centralization. Terra Lliure also attended the event and distributed its leaflets, gaining recognition and new recruits.

In the autumn of 1982, in September and November, the first assembly was held in the south of France. It established the strategy of "armed propaganda" to achieve its objectives, consisting of violent actions, not with the intention of causing personal injury, but rather with the aim of provoking fear and intimidation, as well as seeking maximum media coverage. In its documents, the Terra Lliure organisation always described its activity as "armed propaganda". This concept was used as a euphemism to express the low intensity of the organisation's actions, implying that it did not seek to attack human lives or carry out indiscriminate armed actions. Shortly after this assembly, the police discovered a cache of explosives and weapons in the Collserola mountain range outside Barcelona, which led to the imprisonment of Terra Lliure members Carles Benítez and Xavier Monton. These arrests provoked a crisis in the organisation's leadership that led to the expulsion of some dissident militants who questioned the armed route as a tool for political and social change.

The third assembly was held in July 1988, at which Terra Lliure's leadership wanted to assess the social support that the organisation really had in Catalan society. It also approved a plan of action in view of the 1992 Barcelona Olympics, which was not approved by all members of the organisation due to the deep crisis that already existed within the Catalan pro-independence movement and which led the organisation to enter a period of less combativeness from the 1990s onwards, carrying out very few armed actions. The year 1987 was a turning point because of the actions of ETA and Terra Lliure itself - that year, Terra Lliure caused its only civilian fatality in an attack on 10 September 1987, when the explosion of a device in the courthouse in Les Borges Blanques (Lleida) caused a wall of an adjacent house to collapse, killing a 62-year-old woman, Emilia Aldomà, who was sleeping at the time. The second reason was the attack by Basque ETA in the garage of the Hipercor shopping centre in a predominantly working-class neighbourhood of Barcelona on 19 June 1987, which killed 21 people and injured 45, making it the bloodiest attack in the history of ETA and the second most serious in the history of Spain after the attack of 11 March 2004 in Madrid. The Hipercor attack, together with the subsequent attack on the Civil Guard barracks in Vic (Osona) on 29 May 1991, in which 10 people died, had a double effect for Terra Lliure. ETA's car bombings made it increasingly difficult to continue justifying the 'armed struggle' and reduced social and political support for home-grown violence.

Reflecting on the failure of the organization, Terra Lliure leader Jaume Fernàndez argued that a resilient Catalanist challenge to Spanish government was dependent on the nationalist constituency turning away from the transition process. Because most nationalist Catalans remained loyal to the new regime and trusted the electoral process, Terra Lliure was unable to gain strength. In 1991, Terra Lliure announced a ceasefire with the Spanish government and stated that its members would join the Catalan Republican Left to fight for independent Catalonia through non-violent means. Despite this, the Spanish government continued to hunt members of the organization, and Spanish authorities organized Operation Garzón in 1992, a preventine manhunt that was criticized for human rights activists for "indiscriminate arrests and extensive tortures that brought back the ghost of Francoist repression in Catalan society". Terra Lliure was officially disbanded in 1995, and most of its former members joined the ERC. On 8 March 1996, the Spanish government pardoned the 18 members convicted in the 1995 trial and ordered their immediate release from prison.

=== 1978–1990 ===
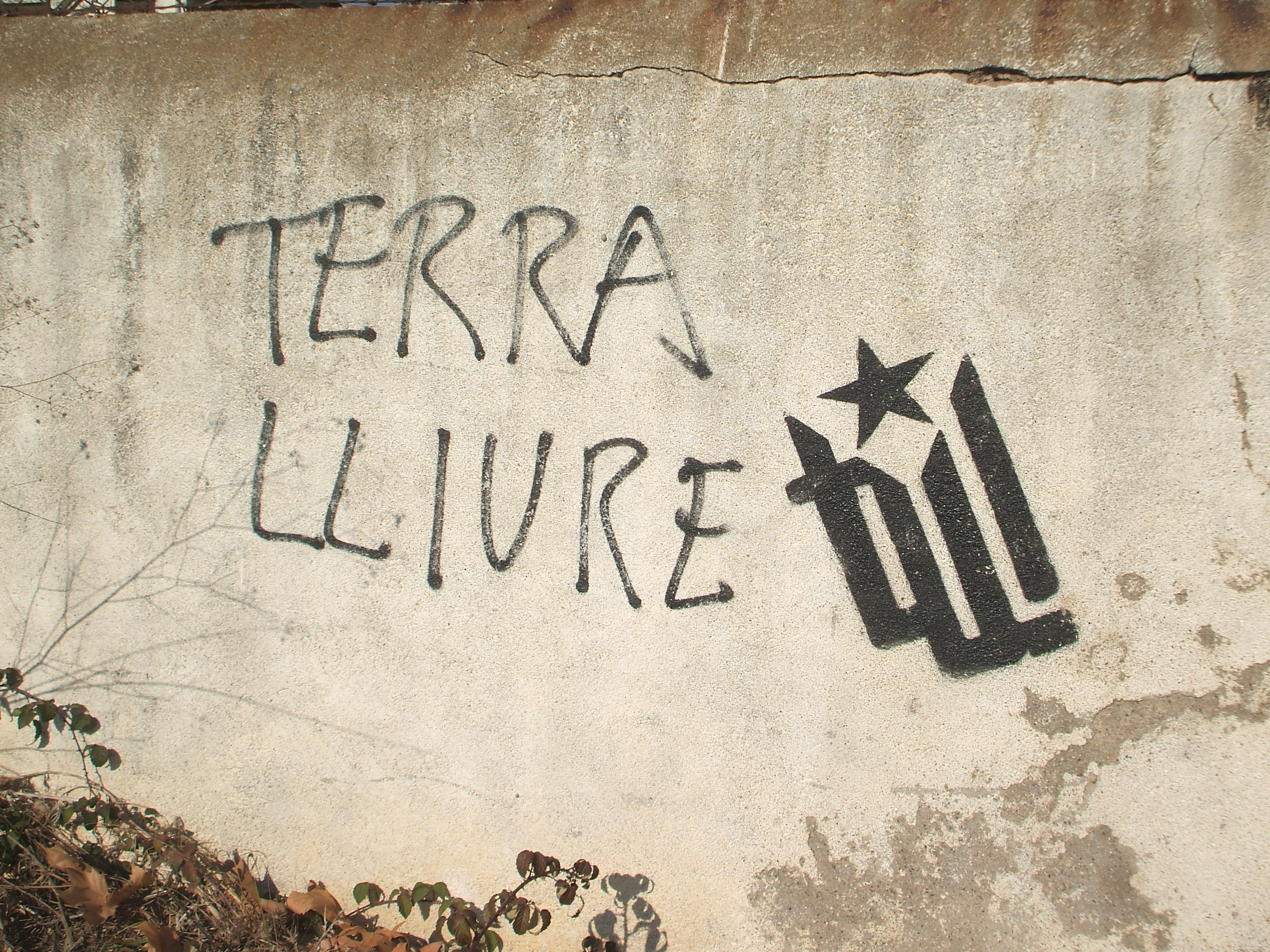
Terra Lliure graffiti

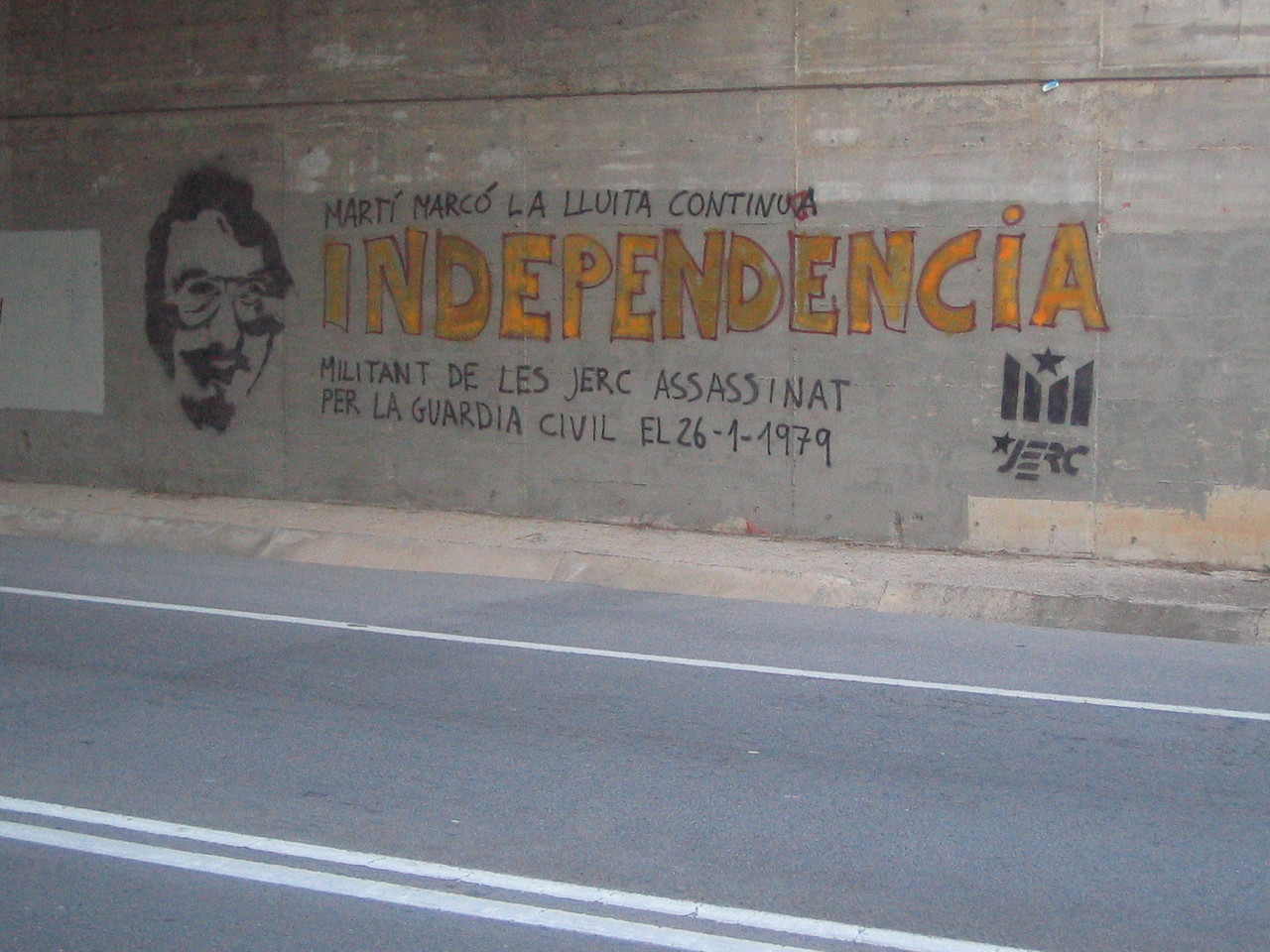
JERC mural in Sabadell honouring Martí Marcó, killed in a police shootout

Most of Terra Lliure's original members converged into the group around 1980, arriving from other armed organizations such as the Catalan People's Army (EPOCA), the Catalan Liberation Front (FAC) or political organizations such as the Socialist Party of National Liberation (PSAN) and Catalan Countries' Independentists. In 1979, Terra Lliure started its armed activities and two of its members died that year, one in a shootout with Civil Guard members and another one blew up himself.

Terra Lliure's best known action was the kidnapping of journalist Federico Jiménez Losantos on 21 May 1981 in Barcelona, for having signed the "Manifesto of the 2,300". This manifesto was a document signed by more than 2,300 intellectuals and professionals living and working in Catalonia and published on 25 January 1981. In it, they defended the co-official status of Catalan and Spanish as the vehicular languages of public education in Catalonia; expressed their concern about the exclusive use of Catalan as the "only official language"; and criticised the policy of the Catalan government to progressively introduce education only in Catalan. After being shot in the knee by Terra Lliure member Pere Bascompte and left tied to a tree, Jiménez Losantos was found by the police the same day. In June, the group published its first statement, called Free Land Calling, in a mass meeting at the Camp Nou stadium.

In 1982, Terra Lliure held its first assembly, while it continued its armed campaign against Spanish and French interests, bank offices and other administrations. A second assembly was held in 1984 and the group started publishing official statements and claimed actions that they carried out through the Alerta magazine. In 1985 and 1985, two more members died while carrying explosive devices.

Between 1984 and 1989 some of Terra Lliure's leaders were arrested, nevertheless the group maintained its structure and capacities and a parallel political movement was developing, the Solidarity Committee with the Catalan Patriots (CSPC) and the Movement for the Defense of the Land (MDT). During these years, starting from 1985, both the MDT and Terra Lliure would receive bomb attacks from Milícia Catalana (MC), a right-wing Spanish nationalist armed group. In 1987, the group committed its only killing, with a bomb attack in Les Borges Blanques, Lleida. Terra Lliure admitted the killing was an error. The group also committed several attacks, mainly against American interests, together with the Catalan Red Liberation Army. In 1988, Terra Lliure held its third assembly and developed three documents to describe the theoretical framework and analyze the social reality of the Catalan National Liberation Movement.

=== 1991–1995 ===
In July 1991, Terra Lliure announced it was declaring a ceasefire and that some of its members would start joining the Republican Left of Catalonia. Despite that, some cells kept carrying out attacks, especially due to the proximity to the Olympic Games in Barcelona in 1992. Also in 1991, a former member of Terra Lliure, who had joined ETA, was killed in a police raid after a bomb attack in Vic, Barcelona.

In July 1992, under an order of judge Baltasar Garzón, police arrested around 40 of members of the group. Years later, the European Court of Human Rights ordered the Spanish government to compensate some of the arrested people for failing to investigate allegations of torture during the raid. The following years, the group did not commit any attack and announced its dissolution on the 1995 National Day of Catalonia.

== Attacks ==
=== 1979 ===
- January 26: Martí Marcó is shot dead by Spanish police at a checkpoint in Barcelona city center.
- June 1: Fèlix Goñi is killed in Barcelona as the bomb he was carrying explodes prematurely.

=== 1980 ===
- July 25: first attacks claimed by Terra Lliure, with two bomb explosions in Fecsa-Endesa offices in Barcelona and Calella.
- September 10: two bomb attacks target the Provincial Education Delegation and the ENHER offices building at the Gràcia district of Barcelona.

=== 1981 ===
- January 2: bomb attacks against Fecsa-Endesa offices in Barcelona and Lleida and against an electricity pylon in Prat de Llobregat.
- April 12: bomb attacks against FECSA office in Terrassa and against a Pirelli factory in Vilanova i la Geltrú.
- May 21: Jiménez Losantos is kidnapped in Santa Coloma de Gramenet. After a few hours, he is released with a shot in the leg.
- May 30: bomb attack against a transmission station of the Spanish TV in Montserrat, the night before Fuerzas Armadas (Spanish army) day.
- June 24: bomb attacks against FECSA offices in Girona, Salou and Reus. Bomb attack against an electric transformer station.
- September 9: bomb attacks against the Spanish treasury's office and the Spanish state labor office in Barcelona, the Spanish treasury's in Tarragona and the Spanish state delegations in Valencia and Alicante.
- October 9: bomb attack against an excavator property of Exmop SA at Pedraforca mountain. Bomb attacks against the Spanish education ministry office and the Spanish courts in Valencia.
- October 29: bomb attacks against the provincial government office in Lleida and against Montepio Laboral savings bank and the Spanish courts in Barcelona.
- November 9: bomb attack against Guardia Civil barracks in Terrassa.

=== 1982 ===
- January 23: bomb attacks against FECSA premises in Cornellà and Sant Cugat del Vallès.
- February 25: bomb attack against Guardia Civil barracks at Alcover.
- May 1: bomb attack against the Spanish state labor office in Girona.
- May 22: bomb attack against Guardia Civil barracks in Vallvidrera which results in two wounded Guardia Civil agents.
- May 30: bomb attack against Spanish employment service offices in Sant Feliu de Llobregat.
- July: bomb attacks against ENHER and FECSA offices at Barcelona and Mollet del Vallès.
- September 2: bomb attack against ICONA offices in Barcelona.

=== 1983 ===
- April 20: bomb attack against Guardia Civil barracks in Sitges.
- September 2: bomb attack against FECSA offices located in the Sants district of Barcelona.
- September 7: mortar attacks against Guardia Civil barracks in Martorell and against a Spanish police station in Barcelona.
- November 8: mortar attacks against the Spanish state delegation offices and against a Spanish police station in Barcelona. The station, in Casarmona, was the same one as in the previous month's attack.
- November 12: bomb attack against the central Spanish courts in Valencia.
- November 15: bomb attacks against two separate offices belonging to Hidroeléctrica Española in Valencia.
- December 2: bomb attack against a FECSA office in the Sarrià district of Barcelona.

=== 1984 ===
- January 20: bomb attacks against two separate Spanish treasury offices in Barcelona.
- January 21: bomb attack against a Spanish police station in the Gràcia district of Barcelona.
- February 10: bomb attack against a FECSA office in the Sant Andreu district of Barcelona.
- March 2: bomb attack against a Spanish police station near Barcelona's port. A patrol car and a police bus are destroyed as a result.
- April 20: bomb attack against a command office of the Spanish Navy in Castelldefels. The building is virtually destroyed by the blast.
- May 9: bomb attack against a Spanish state employment office in Valencia.
- May 12: bomb attacks against El Jardín and Primar bars in Barcelona. Both were involved in heroin trafficking. Another bomb attack against the courts of Barcelona.
- May 13: shrapnel bomb attack against an office belonging to Hidroeléctrica Española in Sueca.
- May 21: parcel bomb against Pedro J. Lapeña, an extreme-right professor at Valencia University.
- May 30: bomb attack against a tax collection office in Valencia.
- June 15: bomb attack against FECSA offices in the Sants district of Barcelona.
- June 26: bomb attacks against the Spanish public works ministry's offices in Valencia.
- June 27: bomb attack against Spanish state employment offices in Valencia.
- July 1: a bomb targeting ENHER offices in Barcelona is defused by the police.
- July 10: coordinated bomb attacks against FECSA offices in Sabadell, Molins de Rei, Terrassa, Sant Cugat del Valles, Martorell and Rubí. Another bomb attack hits offices belonging to Constructora Pirenaica SA in Barcelona.
- July 16: bomb attacks against Hidroeléctrica Española premises and against Spanish state employment offices in Torrent and against the Spanish labor ministry's offices in Barcelona.
- July 18: bomb attacks against Spanish state employment offices in Quart de Poblet and against Spanish Navy premises in Tortosa.
- July 20: Terra Lliure member Josep Antoni Villaescusa dies in Alzira, Valencia after the premature explosion of the bomb he was about to plant in Spanish state employment offices.
- September 8: mortar attacks against Spanish state offices and a Spanish police station in Barcelona. This second attack fails. Another bomb attack targets Guardia Civil barracks in Santa Bàrbara.
- November 2: bomb attacks against two Spanish state employment offices in Barcelona.
- November 28: bomb attack against Guardia Civil barracks in Perelló.

=== 1985 ===
- February 14: bomb attack against Spanish state tax offices in Ripoll.
- March 2: bomb attack against Citroën offices in Gràcia, Barcelona.
- April 22: bomb attack against Spanish Television premises in Miramar.
- July 27: two bomb attacks against FECSA offices in Barcelona.
- August 28: police defuse a bomb aimed at Spanish state employment offices in Barcelona.
- August 31: bomb attack against Spanish state employment offices in Figueres.
- September 3: bomb attack against Spanish state employment offices in Vilafranca del Penedès.
- September 4: bomb attack against Spanish state employment offices in Barcelona.
- September 6: police defuse a bomb aimed at Foment del Treball offices in Barcelona.
- September 11: police defuse a booby trap next to the Spanish Naval Forces Command Center in Barcelona.
- September 17: armed Terra Lliure members assault far-right lawyer Gómez-Rovira's office in Barcelona, leaving behind an explosive device.
- October 30: police defuse a bomb aimed at Guardia Civil barracks in Canet de Mar.
- November 29: bomb attacks against Spanish Police vehicles at Montjuïc, Barcelona.
- December 6: bomb attacks against Spanish state employment offices and a Spanish police station in Barcelona.
- December 8: police defuse a bomb aimed at the Spanish state employment offices in Ripoll.
- December 16: bomb attack against a Spanish police station in Barcelona. Terra Lliure member Quim Sànchez dies as a result of the premature explosion of the device he was carrying.
- December 17: bomb attack against Telefonica offices in Vilafranca del Penedès.
- December 18: bomb attack against a Spanish police vehicle in Barcelona.

=== 1986 ===
- January 7: bomb attack against Spanish state tax collection offices in Arenys de Mar.
- January 8: bomb attack against Spanish courts in Blanes.
- January 11: bomb attacks against Spanish state tax collection offices in Mataró and against state employment offices in Barcelona.
- February 28: bomb attack against Sanyo premises in Barcelona.
- March 5: double bomb attack against an army cultural center in Barcelona.

=== 1987 ===
- January 18: bomb attack against offices of Banco Hispano Americano in Barcelona.
- February 10: bomb attack against state tax collection offices in Via Laietana, Barcelona.
- September 10: bomb attack against the Court in Borjas Blancas. As a result of the terrorist attack dies Emilia Aldomà i Sans.
- December 26: claimed responsibility on a bombing at Bar Iruna in Barcelona which killed an American sailor.

=== 1988 ===
- August 16: bomb attack against the building of the Ministerio de Obras Públicas y Urbanismo in Girona
- September 6: attack against the Instituto Nacional de Empleo in Tarragona, causing the destruction of the building.

=== 1989 ===
- February 27: bomb attack against state tax collection offices in Palma de Mallorca.
- September 11: bomb attack against a building of the Guardia Civil in Banyoles. As a result, two police officers are badly injured.

=== 1990 ===
- February 7: bomb attack against Spanish Labor offices (INEM) in Girona.
- March 21: Terra Lliure's member Jordi Puig, badly injured after the explosive device he was handling in his car explodes in front of the building of the Law Court in Santa Coloma de Farnés.
- May 23: bomb attack against a reconstruction of the Santa María vessel (one of the three vessels used in Columbus' first trip to America) in Barcelona's harbor. The ships results badly damaged.

=== 1991 ===
- May 10: bomb attack against the offices of Telefónica in Lleida.
- May 11: bomb attack against the offices of Telefónica in Girona.
- December 19: bomb attack against the Court building in Cervera.

=== 1992 ===
- February 28: bomb attack against the Court building in Figueres.
- June 29: bomb attacks against offices in Barcelona and Girona.

== See also ==
- History of Spain
- History of Catalonia
