= Premio Tiepolo =

Spanish and Italian award for economic relationship development

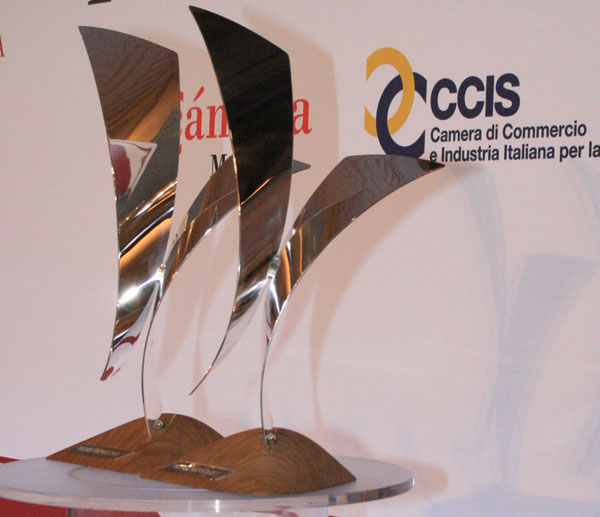
Premio Tiepolo

The Premio Tiepolo is an award conferred every year to both an Italian and a Spanish personality who have been particularly distinguished for their contribution to the integration and development of the economic-trade relations between Italy and Spain, created in 1996 by the Italian Chamber of Commerce and Industry for Spain (CCIS). The award is decided by a jury composed of Spanish journalists and Italian news correspondents located in Spain.

The name of the prize comes from the Italian painter, Lorenzo Tiepolo, who spent much of his life in Madrid, where he completed several frescoes for the Royal Palace and died in 1770. The first edition of the Premio Tiepolo was celebrated in 1996 at the Italian Embassy in Madrid. On that occasion the winners were Cesare Romiti, President of the Fiat Group and Isidoro Álvarez, President of El Corte Ingles.

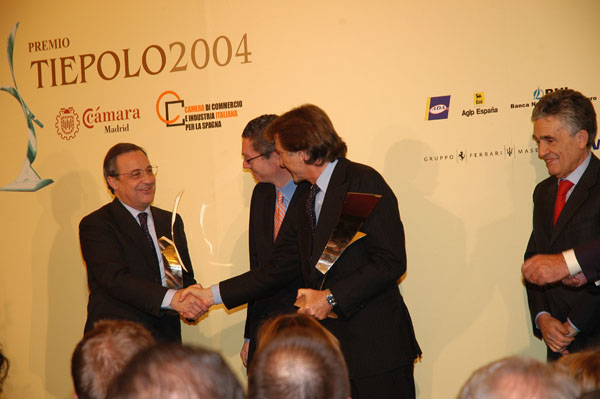
Entrega IX Premio Tiepolo

The Premio Tiepolo award ceremony is organized by CCIS, located in Madrid, and since the year 2016 by the Spanish Confederation of Business Organisations (CEOE) of Madrid as well.

== Prizewinners ==
Source: Cámara de Comercio Italiana para España

- 1996 - Cesare Romiti, President of Fiat Group and Isidoro Álvarez, President of El Corte Inglés
- 1997 - Giorgio Fossa, President of Confindustria and José María Cuevas, President of CEOE
- 1998 - Antonio Fazio, Governor of Bank of Italy and Luis Ángel Rojo, Governor of Bank of Spain.
- 1999 - Giovanni Agnelli, Honorary President of Fiat Group and José Ángel Sánchez Asiaín, President of BBV Foundation.
- 2000 - Luciano Benetton, President of Benetton Group and Luis Alberto Salazar Simpson, President of Amena
- 2001 - Marco Tronchetti Provera, President of Pirelli Group and Rodolfo Martín Villa, President of Endesa Spain.
- 2002 - Pier Luigi Fabrizi, President of Banca Monte dei Paschi di Siena and Gabriele Burgio, President of NH Hotel Group and José Vilarasau Salat, President of La Caixa.
- 2003 - Vittorio Mincato, Chief Executive Officer of ENI Group and Alfonso Cortina, President of Repsol YPF
- 2004 - Luca Cordero di Montezemolo, President of Ferrari and Florentino Pérez, President of Real Madrid F.C.
- 2005 - Mario Monti, Dean of Bocconi University of Milan and Rodrigo Rato, Chief Executive Officer of the International Monetary Fund.
- 2006 - Francesco Morelli, President of the European Design Institute and Jesús Salazar Bello, President of SOS Group
- 2007 - Antoine Bernheim, President of Generali and José Manuel Martínez, President of Mapfre
- 2008 - Paolo Vasile, Chief Executive Officer of Gestevisión Telecinco and José Manuel Lara Bosch, President of Planeta Group
- 2009 - Fulvio Conti, Director General of Enel and César Alierta, Executive President of Telefónica S.A.
- 2010 - Massimo Moratti, President of Inter Milan F.C. and Enrique Cerezo, President of Football club Atlético de Madrid S.A.D.
- 2011 - Gilberto Benetton, President of Autogrill - Antonio Vázquez, President of Iberia
- 2012 – Alberto Bombassei, President of Brembo and Borja Prado, President of Endesa.
- 2013 - Pietro Salini, President of Salini Impregilo and Juan-Miguel Villar Mir, President of OHL.
- 2014 - S.M. el Rey Don Juan Carlos
- 2015 - Alfredo Altavilla, COO EMEA of the FCA group and Joan Rosell, President of CEOE
- 2016 - Francesco Monti, President of Esprinet and Francisco Reynés, Vice-president and CEO of Abertis and President of Cellnex Telecom
- 2017 - Urbano Cairo, President and CEO of RCS MediaGroup and Antonio Huertas, President of Mapfre
- 2018 - Luigi Lana, President of Reale Group and Antonio Hernández Callejas, President of Ebro Foods
- 2019 - Marco Alverà, CEO of Snam and Antonio Llardén, President of Enagás
- 2021 - Francesco Starace, CEO of Enel and José Manuel Entrecanales, President of Acciona
- 2022 - Luigi Ferraris, CEO of Ferrovie dello Stato Italiane - José Bogas, CEO of Endesa
- 2023 - Gian Maria Gros-Pietro, President of Intesa Sanpaolo - Alejandra Kindelán, President of Asociación Española de Banca
- 2024 - Andrés Arizkorreta, presidente de CAF (Construcciones y Auxiliar de Ferrocarriles) - Andrea Sironi, presidente de Assicurazioni Generali
- 2025 - Manuel Manrique, presidente de Sacyr SA - Edoardo Garrone, presidente de ERG SpA - Enrico Letta, Dean IE University
- 2026 - Benito Tesier Sierra, director general de Brembo Iberia - Giovanni Ferrero, presidente ejecutivo de Grupo Ferrero

== See also ==
- List of economics awards
