= ERCA =

ERCA may refer to:

- Extended Range Cannon Artillery
- Essex Region Conservation Authority
- Catalan Red Liberation Army (Catalan: Exèrcit Roig Català d'Alliberament)
