= Manuel Prado y Colón de Carvajal =

Spanish diplomat, businessman and politician

Manuel Prado y Colón de Carvajal (1931 - 5 December 2009) was a Spanish diplomat, businessman and politician. He served as an administrator for King Juan Carlos I of Spain for more than twenty years.

Prado y Colón, the son of a Chilean diplomat, was born in Quito, Ecuador, in 1931. He earned a law degree at the Complutense University of Madrid and a Bachelor of Science in economics at the London School of Economics. A businessman by profession, Manuel Prado worked in the automobile, telecommunications and financial industries. He was chairman of Iberia Airlines from 1976 until 1978. He also sat on the boards of directors of both Infeisa and WWF/Adena at various times during his career.

Prado y Colón was sentenced to two years in prison in 2004 in Sevilla, but was granted an early release two months later due to humanitarian reasons. However, in 2007 the Supreme Court of Spain sentenced Colón to one year in prison for diverting funds to the Torras Group. He was given an additional three months sentence in February 2008 in the Grand Tibidabo case.

A personal friend and advisor to King Juan Carlos for more than twenty years, Colón founded the Foundation for Help Against Drug Addiction (FAD). Queen Sofia currently serves as FAD's president.

Manuel Prado y Colón de Carvajal died of cancer at his home in Sevilla, Spain, on 5 December 2009, at the age of 78. He was survived by his second wife, Celia García Corona, and his children. His son, Borja Prado, is the chairman of the Endesa power company as of 2009.
