= José Manuel Entrecanales =

Spanish businessman and banker (born 1963)

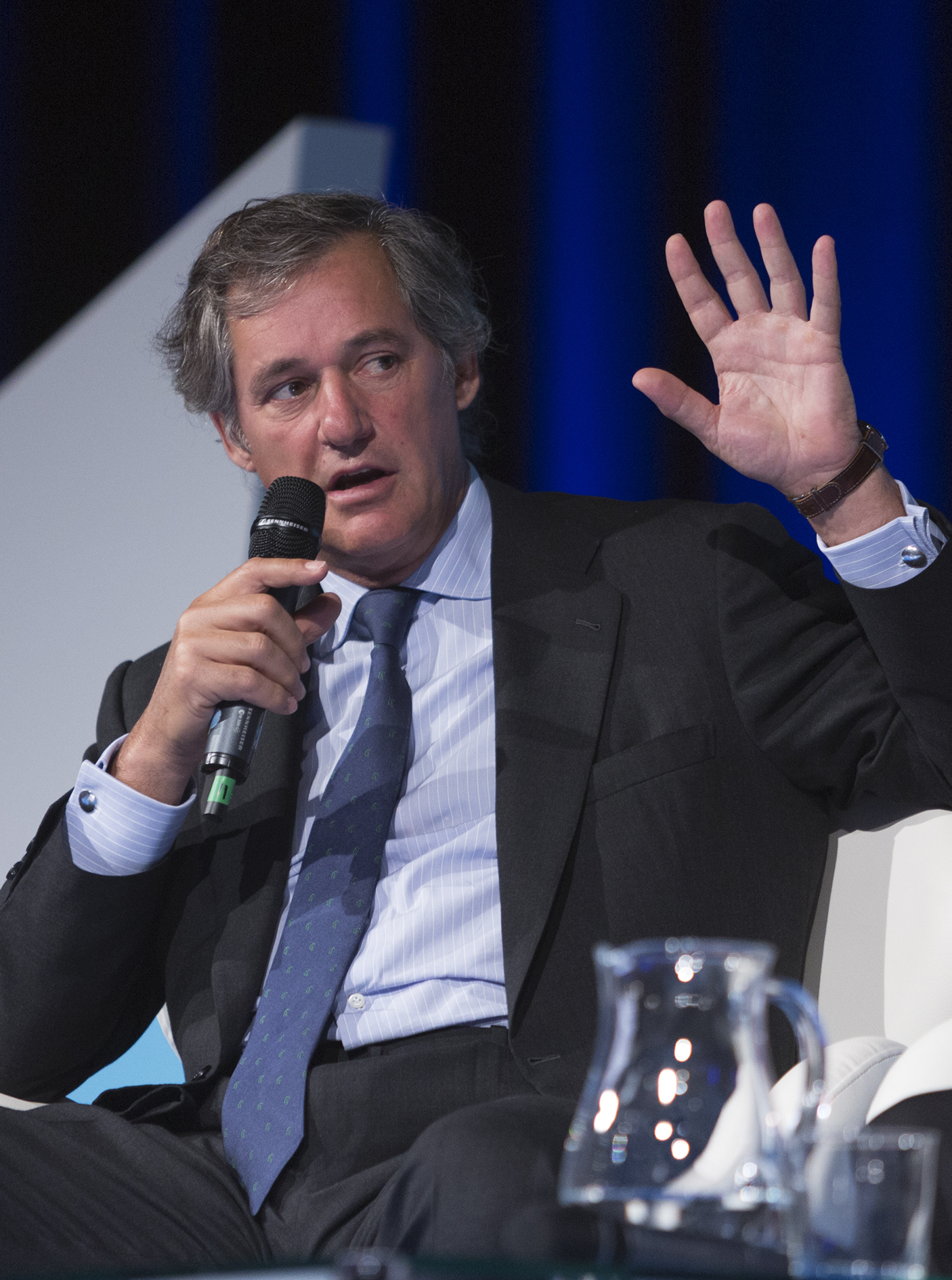
- At a climate change conference in Barcelona, 2017

Chairman of Acciona
- Incumbent
- Assumed office 30 January 2004

Chairman of Endesa
- In office 18 October 2007 – 24 March 2009

Personal details
- Born: 1 January 1963 (age 63) Madrid, Spain
- Spouse: María Carrión
- Children: José Entrecanales Carrión; Gonzalo Entrecanales Carrión; Clotilde Entrecanales Carrión; Gerardo Entrecanales Carrión
- Education: Complutense University of Madrid
- Occupation: Businessman

José Manuel Entrecanales Domecq (born 1 January 1963) is a Spanish businessman and former banker. In 2004, he succeeded his late father as chairman and CEO of Acciona, a global leader company focused on sustainable solutions in infrastructure, renewable energy and water. In 2019, Forbes ranked him the 85th richest person in Spain, estimating his personal wealth at US$362 million, although his family fortune is estimated at around US$3.6 billion.

Entrecanales has been highlighted as a key leader of a new generation of Spanish businessmen "shaped by family roots but identifying fully with modernisation". He is a firm advocate of the fight against climate change at a corporate level, which earned him the Order of the Rising Sun, as well as being asked to speak frequently at global forums, including the 2022 UN Climate Change Conference.

== Biography ==
José Manuel Entrecanales was born 1 January 1963 in Madrid to an influential family of businessmen. His father was José María Entrecanales y de Azcárate, Chairman of Acciona (son of José Entrecanales e Ibarra, co-founder of the company) and his mother, Blanca Domecq y Zurita, was the daughter of the 2nd Viscount of Almocadén. Entrecanales read Economics at the Complutense University of Madrid.

== Personal life ==
In 1985, he began his career as an investment banker at Merrill Lynch in New York and later, London. Between 1995 and 2007, he was chairman of Vodafone España and between 2007 and 2009 he shared the presidencies of Endesa and Acciona.

Entrecanales is married to María Carrión, and has 4 children: José, Gonzalo, Clotilde and Gerardo. His three sons attended Eton College.

He is a polo enthusiast as well as a keen golfer with a 5,2 handicap, practising both sports at Puerta de Hierro.

== Professional career ==
He began his career in 1985 in Merrill Lynch, sharing his time between New York and London. He moved to Acciona in 1991. In 1995, the family business bought a majority share package of a mobile company called Airtel and José Manuel Entrecanales was named CEO in 2000, replacing Juan Abelló. In 2003, Vodafone bought Acciona’s shares of Airtel and Entrecanales was the CEO of Vodafone Spain up until October 2007.

In 2004, he inherited the presidency of the Acciona Group from his father. As CEO of Acciona, José Manuel Entrecanales has transformed the construction and engineering company into a global infrastructure, energy and water services company with over 50,000 employees and presence in 52 countries. In 2007, Acciona bought 25% of Endesa and Entrecanales was named its CEO until they sold its shares in 2009.

== Distinctions ==
An advocate of sustainable development and the fight against climate change, José Manuel Entrecanales is a member of some of the world's leading organizations promoting sustainable development such as the United Nations Global Compact, the World Bank’s Carbon Pricing Leadership Coalition, and the World Business Council for Sustainable Development (WBCSD).

In addition, José Manuel Entrecanales is a Trustee of the Princess of Asturias Foundation, the Prado Museum, as well as Vice President of the Fundación Pro CNIC and the Instituto de Empresa Familiar. Is Ambassador of the Spain Brand (Marca España).

He is Chairman of acciona.org, a foundation dedicated to promoting universal access to water and energy. In 2009, he created the Fundación José Manuel Entrecanales Innovación y Emprendimiento para la innovación en sostenibilidad, which, among other things, acts as a business angel for companies to help them improve the use of resources (energy, water, etc.).

== Honours ==
- Sorolla Medal (2017) from the Hispanic Society of America
- Japan: Order of the Rising Sun (2018)
- Premio Tiepolo (2018)
- Honorary Doctorate of Business by RMIT University in Melbourne (Australia) (2024)

== See also ==
- Economy of Spain

Business positions
Preceded by José María Entrecanales Azcárate	Chairman of Acciona; 2004–present
