= Operation Garzón =

Spanish police operation targeting the Catalan independence movement

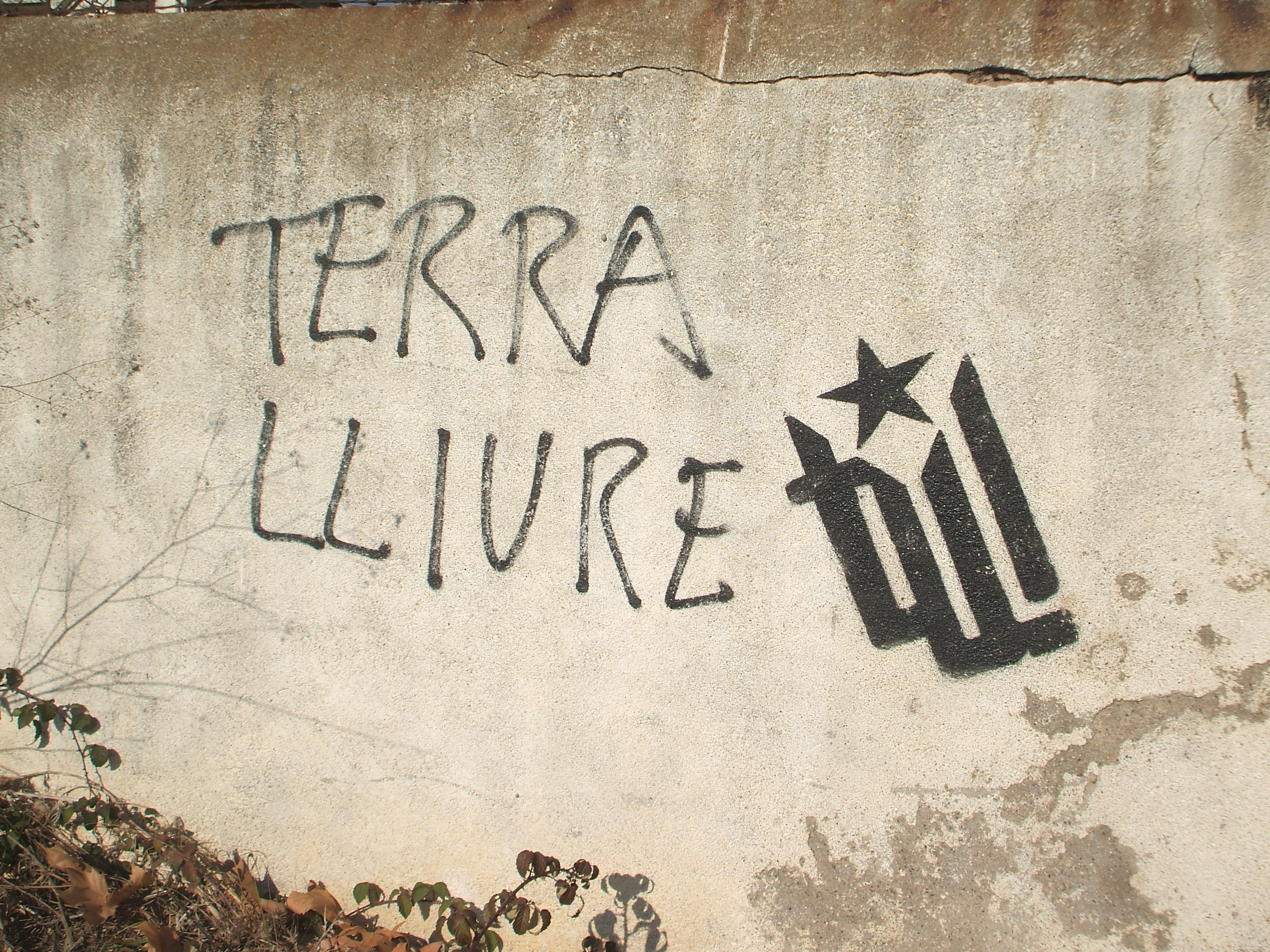
Terra Lliure graffiti

Operation Garzón (Catalan: Operació Garzón, Spanish: Operación Garzón) was a police operation which saw the arrest of 45 Catalan pro-independence individuals and the search of the headquarters of Catalan newspapers and pro-independence organizations in 1992, prior to the 1992 Summer Olympics held in Barcelona, Catalonia's capital city. Over 30 people were arrested between 29 June and 14 July 1992, including two journalists, the mayor of Ribera d'Urgellet and activists in the Catalan independence movement, and more were arrested some days later. The arrested were claimed to be members of the armed Catalan pro-independence organisation Terra Lliure, often with no real proof besides their involvement in the pro-independence movement. Even though Terra Lliure had already announced its dissolution the previous year, the Operation was carried out under the official reason of preventing a possible attack during the 1992 Summer Olympics. However, those who were arrested believe it was done to scare Catalan independentists from using the widely followed event as a platform for their political movement. The operation is named after the Spanish judge Baltasar Garzón, who was its main director.

In 1995, 25 of the detainees were tried and, of these, 18 were convicted of belonging to Terra Lliure using the confession many of them had allegedly been forced to memorize during torture, when the police threatened them and their families if they did not declare this. 17 of the detainees alleged that they had been tortured, but judge Baltazar Garzón refused to investigate it despite the bruises in the detainees' bodies. This ended up in the European Court of Human Rights in 2004 which condemned the Spanish State for refusing to investigate the torture allegations.

Political activists argue that the Spanish State used the Operation Garzón as a tool, under the pretext of security during the Olympic Games, to weaken the left-wing branch of Catalan independence movement.

== Torture testimony ==
Garzón ordered that 25 of the arrested be kept in solitary confinement. 17 out of these 25 said that they had suffered torture at the hands of the Spanish police as well as threats of violence and rape to them and their families, Catalanophobic insults, and at least one of them reached the point of attempting suicide.
