= Eurogas =

Eurogas is an association representing the European gas wholesale, retail and distribution sectors towards the EU institutions. The association aims to strengthen the role of gas in the energy mix by establishing an ongoing dialogue with European industry players, global gas producers and relevant institutions. Eurogas was founded in 1990, with its members currently including over 100 companies and associations from 30 countries.

The association supports a robust European gas market that encourages competitiveness, supports security of supply, delivers benefits to customers, stimulates energy efficiency and plays a significant role in reducing CO_{2} emissions. Its members work together, analysing the impact of EU political and legislative initiatives on their business, to communicate their findings to the EU stakeholders and to suggest improvements. The association also provides statistics and forecasts on gas consumption in Europe.

In 2024, Eurogas reported a turnover of approximately €3,035,000, of which €411,855 came from EU grants.

== History ==
Eurogas was founded in 1990 to strengthen the representation of interests of the gas industry. It replaced the informal grouping called COMETEC-Gas (Committee for Economic Studies of the Gas Industry), a Brussels-based union representing the European gas industry.

List of presidents:

- Juan Badosa, former chairman of Enagás (1990)
- François Guttman, former chairman of Gaz de France (1990-1994)
- George Verberg, former CEO of Gasunie (1994-1998)
- Burckhard Bergmann, former chairman of the Board of E. ON Ruhrgas AG (1998-2000)
- Pierre Gadonneix, former president of Gaz de France (2000-2004)
- Simon Lewis, former communications and public policy director of Centrica (2004)
- Enrique Locutura former CEO of Gas Natural SDG (2005)
- Willy Bosmans, former CEO of Electrabel (2006-2008)
- Domenico Dispenza, former COO of ENI SpA (2008-2010)
- Jean-François Cirelli, former vice-chairman and president of Engie (formerly knows as GDF SUEZ) (2010-2014)
- Gertjan Lankhorst, CEO of GasTerra (June 2014 to 2016)
- Klaus Schäfer, CEO of Uniper (2016 to 2019)
- Philippe Sauquet, President Gas, Renewables & Power and Executive Vice President, Strategy & Innovation of Total (2019–2021)
- Didier Holleaux, Executive Vice-President of ENGIE Group (2021-2024)
- Cristian Signoretto, Director of Global Gas and LNG Portfolio and Deputy Chief Operating Officer for Natural Resources at Eni (2024-present)

List of secretaries general:

- Peter Claus (1990-2002)
- Jean-Marie Devos (2002 – 2011)
- Beate Raabe (2011 to 2019)
- James Watson (2019–2024)
- Andreas Guth (2024-present)

== Missions ==
Eurogas oversees the operation of the gas market and is devoted to strengthen the role of gas in the energy mix, by establishing an ongoing dialogue with European industry players, global producers of gas and EU relevant institutions.

Eurogas aims to strengthen the role of gas in the European energy mix, promote the smooth functioning of the European internal gas market, and provide structured support to its members on EU policy issues.

The association's objectives include:

- Promoting the interests of its members involved in gas supply, trading and distribution.
- Promoting the development of gas in Europe in the legal, economic, technical and scientific areas to prepare studies and to promote cooperation within the gas industry.
- Promoting the smooth functioning of the internal gas market and undertaking, in its field of competence, any activity which may contribute to the sustainable development of Europe.
- Helping to improve knowledge of gas, of its performance and its use in Europe .
- Taking stance on issues of common interest to the European gas industry with respect to international and supra-national organisations, including, but not limited to, the European Institutions, and to public opinion.
- Supporting information exchange on gas issues of general interest between public and private players and European gas industry representatives.

== Activities ==
Eurogas focuses its activities on the following areas of the European energy policy:

- Energy efficiency
- Climate change policies and environmental protection
- Renewable energy
- Energy statistics and economic forecasts
- Energy supply security
- Energy market design
- Gas market competitiveness
- Storage and supply of liquefied natural gas
- Energy taxation

== Organisation ==
- President: Philippe Sauquet, president gas, renewables and power and executive vice president, strategy and innovation of Total
- The general assembly meets once a year to define the priority tasks of the association.
- Governing board: chaired by the president, with an elected board composed of representatives of its member companies, associations and federations.
- Groups / working groups: industry experts from the member organisations respond to questions concerning the gas market. The general secretariat is responsible for managing its panels and coordinating their work.
- The general secretariat: it is responsible for advocacy, coordination and daily management of the association.

== See also ==
- Official website
