= Marco Alverà =

Italian businessman and CEO of Snam, part of a family of 4

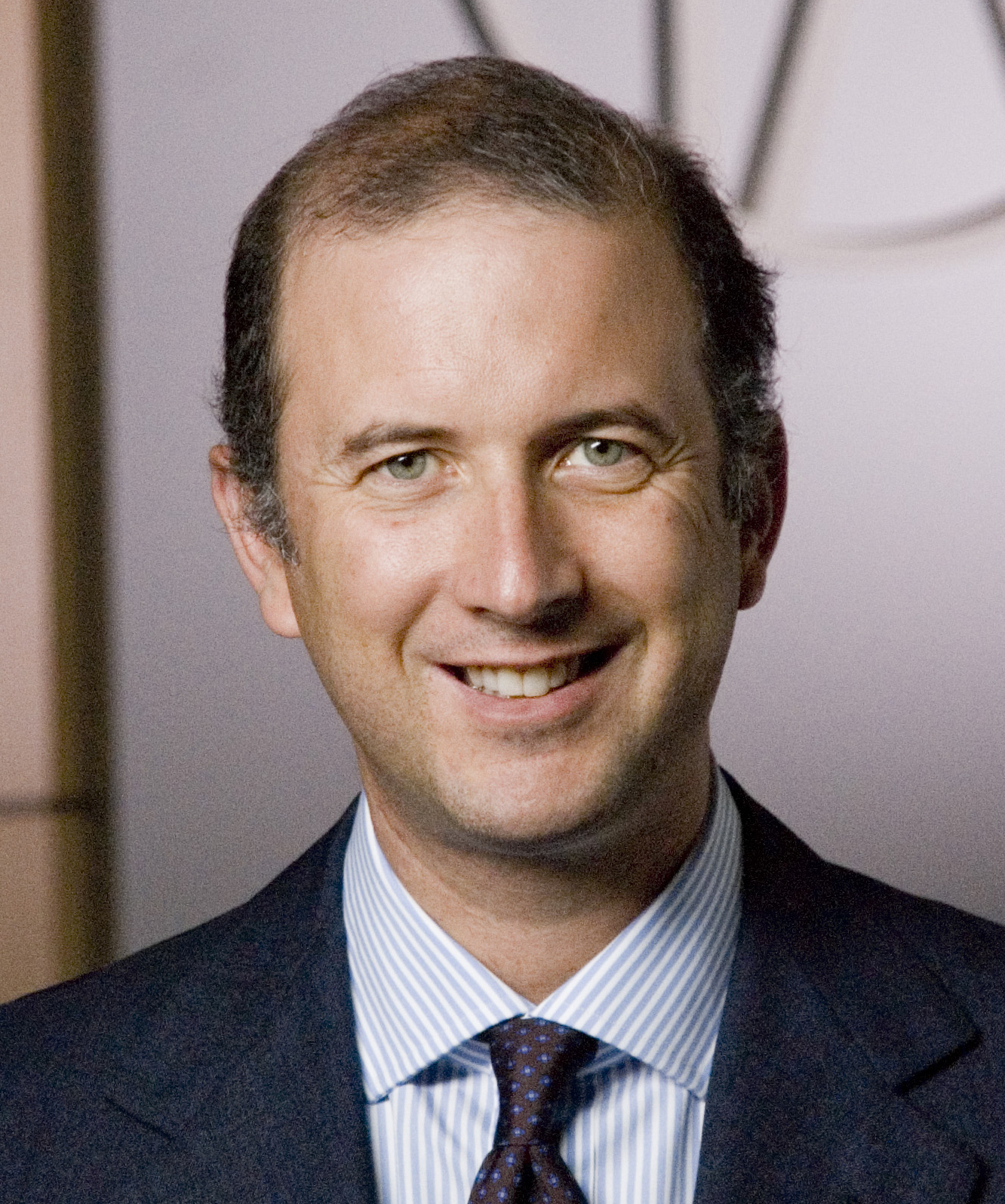
- Born: August 1975 (age 50); New York City, United States
- Occupation: Chief Executive
- Spouse: Selvaggia Alazraki
- Children: Lipsi, Greta

Marco Alverà (born August 1975) is an Italian businessman and Co-founder and CEO of TES since June 2022.

== Education ==
Alverà studied at the London School of Economics, where he earned a degree in Philosophy and Economics in 1997.

== Career ==
Alverà began his career at Goldman Sachs in London., working in private equity focused on internet and technology startups and mergers and acquisitions focused on consumer and retail assets.

In 2000, he co-founded Netesi, the first broadband ADSL company in the Italian market. It was sold to Telecom Italia.

Between 2002 and 2004, he worked as the Director of Group Corporate Strategy and a member of the management committee at Enel, where he followed Terna’s initial listing in the market.

In 2004 he was appointed chief financial officer of Wind Telecom, where he was responsible for the oversight of Wind's acquisition by Orascom in 2004.

Alverà was also appointed chief executive officer of Promgas in 2005. He was involved with the Blue Stream project.

In November 2019, Marco Alverà was awarded the Tiepolo Prize 2019 for strengthening Snam's international presence.

=== Eni ===
In 2005, Alverà joined Eni’s Gas and Power Division, where he managed its leading European Gas and Power portfolio and acquisitions. In 2008 he joined Eni’s Exploration and Production Division as the Executive Vice President, managing operations and development responsibility for Russia, North Europe, and North and South America. In 2010 he was appointed chief executive officer of Eni Trading and Shipping. In 2012, he became Senior Executive Vice President of Optimisation and Trading, and the following year, he took on responsibility for the business unit Midstream, responsible for energy commodity supply, logistics and trading activities. From July to September 2015, he acted as the Chief Retail Market Gas & Power Officer.

=== Snam ===
Alverà joined Snam in 2016, first as the Chief Operating Officer, before being appointed chief executive officer in April of the same year. In 2016 he oversaw the demerge of Italgas. He was Chief Industrial Assets Officer from July 2016 to December 2017.

Between April 2016 and April 2017, he was chairman of the Board of Snam Rete Gas (an operating company of Snam), and later on was appointed managing director of the same.

In April 2019 Snam, of which Marco Alverà is CEO launched the first injection of a hydrogen and natural gas into the pipeline, the Europe's first commercial test of a hydrogen-methane blend in a high-pressure network.

=== TES (Tree Energy Solutions) ===
In June 2022, Alverà joined TES (Tree Energy Solutions) as Group Chief Executive officer and as an investor. TES is a green hydrogen company.

=== Other positions ===
Alverà is the first President of GasNaturally, the partnership representing the European gas industry, since June 2017.

He is a member of the board of S&P Global, as of March 2017, a member of the General Council of the Giorgio Cini Foundation in Venice since December 2016 and vice-president of the Snam foundation. Between 2013 and 2016 he held the role of Associate Fellow at the Oxford University Centre for Corporate Reputation, specializing in business conduct in an African context. He served on the Performance Theatre's advisory board from 2011 to 2015 and he is currently a member of the Council on Foreign Relations.

He has previously sat on the board of Gazprom Neft, and has also served as the Operating Vice President of Eurogas.

With his native family he founded the Kenta Foundation in Milan, a not-profit organization which aims to spread STEM culture and technical activities among girls and women (especially within the school-work relationship).

== Published works ==
- "La posizione dell’Enel" chapter in Le grandi infrastruture di rete. L’Europa dell’energia: Francia e Italia, 2004 edited by Marco Fortis and Cristina Poli
- “The surprising ingredient that makes businesses work better” at TED@BCG event in Milan on Oct 4 2017.
- "Generation H - Healing the climate with hydrogen" with contributions from international experts.
- Zhero. Salani. 2020. ISBN 978-8831005289. OCLC 1276913962.
- The Hydrogen Revolution. Hodder & Stoughton. 2021. ISBN 978-1529360271. OCLC 1258120800.

== See also ==
- Snam
