= El Descanso bombing =

Terrorist bombing in Madrid during the 1980s

Coordinates: 40°26′56.1″N 3°32′56.4″W

- Location: Madrid, Spain
- Date: 12 April 1985; 22:30 (UTC+1)
- Target: El Descanso restaurant
- Attack type: Terrorist bombing
- Weapon: Improvised explosive device
- Deaths: 18
- Injuries: 82
- Perpetrator: Islamic Jihad Organization (suspected)

On 12 April 1985, the El Descanso restaurant in Torrejon de Ardoz outside Madrid, Spain, was bombed in a terrorist attack. The explosion caused the three-story building to collapse, crashing down on about 200 diners and employees, killing 18 people, all Spanish citizens, and injuring 82 others, including eleven Americans working at the nearby Torrejón Air Base who frequented the restaurant. At the time it was the deadliest attack in Spain since the Spanish Civil War.

== Bombing ==
At about 22:30, a bomb exploded in the El Descanso-La Casa de las Costillas restaurant, causing the three-story building housing the restaurant to collapse. The building crashed down on about 200 diners and employees present in the restaurant, killing 18 people and injuring 82. Fifteen American servicemen of the nearby American Torrejón Air Base were among the injured, but while being frequented by air base staff the timing of the bomb occurred at an hour few Americans typically were present. The police investigation concluded that the explosion was caused by a 13-pound chloratite bomb planted near the bathroom of the restaurant, consisting of a chemical compound made up of potassium, sulfur and chlorate, a type of explosive said to be rarely used by domestic Spanish terrorist groups.

== Investigation ==
Groups claiming responsibility for the attack included Basque separatist group ETA, the First of October Anti-Fascist Resistance Groups (GRAPO), Unity of the Abu Zeinab Martyrs, Wa'd (a front of the PFLP-SC) and the Islamic Jihad Organization. The callers from ETA claimed the bomb had gone off earlier than planned and that the bombing was meant to target American soldiers who would have been in the restaurant later, and apologised to the victims of the bombing.

After first blaming ETA, Spanish Interior Minister José Barrionuevo concluded the Islamic Jihad Organization and Wa'd had the most credible claim of responsibility following investigations by the National Police. The claim by Wa'd, distributed by the Kuwait News Agency was noted as it included the anagram of the sugar envelopes from the El Descanso restaurant. ETA was also known to have had ties to extremists in Lebanon and Syria where they had access to training camps, and investigators suspected links between Islamic Jihad, ETA and GRAPO. Islamic Jihad had itself been implicated in several attacks in Spain the previous year, including a machine gun attack on a Kuwaiti newspaper publisher and the killing and wounding of two Saudi Arabians, both attacks in Marbella, and the shooting of a Lebanese embassy employee in Madrid.

According to the El País newspaper and the Group of Strategic Studies, which cite the attack as "the first attack of Islamist terrorism in Spain," the credibility of Islamic Jihad eventually gained weight, also as a letter circulated two weeks after the bombing stated: "Islam is ready. Spain and Italy are the first targets. The attack in Madrid has been the beginning of the Islamic holy war. Death to the United States. The apostles of death are ready to resume the holy war."

== Later developments ==
The case was closed in 1987 due to a lack of arrests. Only the claim by the Islamic Jihad Organization was included in the closing summary. In 1992 judge Baltasar Garzón made enquiries into the Marbella-based Syrian arms dealer Monzer al-Kassar who was linked to numerous crimes including the Achille Lauro hijacking, without results.

In 2005, Spain requested the alleged Muslim Brotherhood and al-Qaeda operative Mustafa Setmariam Nasar's extradition from Pakistan on suspicion of having had a role in the bombing after a witness report linked Nasar to the 2004 Madrid train bombings.

== See also ==
- Madrid airline office attacks
- Bar Iruna attack
- Rhein-Main Air Base bombing
