= Catalan Patriotic Movement =

Catalan Patriotic Movement: Catalan: Moviment Patriòtic Català; Spanish: Movimiento Patriotico Catalán
- Leader: Carlos Francisoud
- Founded: 1994
- Preceded by: Milícia Catalana
- Merged into: Platform for Catalonia
- Newspaper: Esclat
- Youth wing: Batzegada
- Ideology: National syndicalism; Spanish nationalism; Spanish unionism; Traditionalism; Integralism; Catalanism; Republicanism
- Political position: Far-right
- Religion: Catholicism

Party flag

Catalan Patriotic Movement (Catalan: Moviment Patriòtic Català; Spanish: Movimiento Patriótico Catalán, MPC) was a minor Spanish national syndicalist political party active in Catalonia, established in 1994 as the political successor of the former armed group Milicia Catalana (MC). They sought to defend Catalan identity within the framework of Spain, advocating for preserving the political unity of the nation, using both Catalan and Spanish languages in their publications and drawing primarily from the concept of Hispanic Catalanism.

== History ==
=== Formation ===
The MPC was formed in Barcelona by former militants of the integralist armed group Milicia Catalana in 1994. It was founded by Carlos Francisoud Araguas, after being released from prison in the 1990s due to his clandestine activities as one of the leaders of said group. In contrast with its predecessor, the MPC intended to focus on the political path and not the armed struggle supported by MC, although this would not always be fulfilled.

=== Ideology and campaign ===
Ideologically, the organization maintained the posture of its predecessor, the MC. The MPC supported national syndicalism and was strongly influenced by Catholic integralism, with certain inspiration in the Carlista movement. Its primary objective was the opposition towards Catalonian separatism, supporting the union of Spanish and Catalonian identity. The party was also supportive of republicanism.

The MPC also organized a youth wing called Batzegada, and a publication called Esclat, published in both Spanish and Catalan. In 2001, as a member of Batzegada, Diego José Frías Álvarez would be responsible of planting a bomb in the Barcelona Sants railway station, during a concert in support of prisoners from ETA, a far-left terrorist organization responsible of over 800 deaths. Some ex-members of the MPC have joined Platform for Catalonia.
