= Milícia Catalana =

Former armed Spanish nationalist group (1985–1991)

- Flag
- Other name: MC
- Founders: Carlos Franciosud; Juan Carlos Criado; Jorge Laborda... and others
- Leaders: Carlos Franciosud (1985–1991); Juan Carlos Criado (1985–1986)
- Founded: 24 August 1985
- Dates active: 1985–1986; 1989–1991
- Country: Spain
- Newspaper: Combat (1990–1991)
- Active regions: Barcelona, Catalonia
- Ideology: Integrism; Spanish nationalism; Traditionalism; Anti-Catalanism
- Political position: Far-right
- Status: Inactive

Milícia Catalana (Spanish: Milícia Catalana, lit. 'Catalan Militia'; MC) was a Spanish nationalist and Catholic armed group that operated between 1986 and the mid 90s in Catalonia, Spain. Founded on 24 August 1985, the group was formed by Catholic priests affiliated with the Parroquia de San Félix Africano, who espoused the integralist teachings of Marcel Lefebvre, alongside notable figures from the Hermandad Sacerdotal Española. The emergence of this group is due to the parallel emergence in Spain of other violent right-wing groups that attacked the democratic opposition and the growing independentist and/or socialist movements. The political wing of Milícia Catalana was the Catalan Patriotic Movement (MPC).

The main targets of the group were Catalan independence-related associations and independentist organizations, such as the Moviment de Defensa de la Terra, the most prominent extra-parliamentary political expression of the independence movement, and Terra Lliure, a far-left terrorist organization; but Milícia Catalana also attacked clinics where abortions were practiced (in 1989, the Dexeus Clinic's façade was damaged by an explosion attributed to the organisation), LGBT locals and brothels. Similarly, they sent threats and intimidated collectives of the alternative left and those who satirized Catholicism, like Els Joglars, a popular theater company. One of its most famous attacks was the fire near the Sanctuary of Montserrat in August 1986, burning 2,000 hectares, 75% of the mountain area, and leaving 1,000 people isolated in the sanctuary for a day. The group was also opposed to other far-left non-Catalan armed groups, such as ETA and GRAPO.

The group had relations with the Spanish police, denouncing pro-independence groups in collusion with the police and the Guardia Civil. This was confirmed by the death of a policeman, and Milícia Catalana militant, while planting an explosive in 1989. That the police gave Milícia Catalana information about the independentist movement was confirmed by Juan Carlos Criado Guasch, one of the founders of the group, in 1989.

== Ideology ==
The ideology of Milícia Catalana was deeply rooted in Catholic integralism and Spanish unionism, drawing significant inspiration from Marcel Lefebvre's teachings. Their official stance was published on their Manifiesto Social (1989), where they outlined their objectives and unwavering commitment to their cause. Within this manifesto, the group expressed opposition to bourgeois nationalism, separatism, the 1978 constitution and what they perceived as "amoralist, secularizing, and foreignizing currents".

Their actions were strategically directed towards supporting an "armed struggle", primarily targeting Catalan nationalist and separatist organizations, as well as bookstores associated with these movements. Additionally, they singled out entities or individuals whom they saw as challenging or diverging from the established moral standards upheld by Catholic doctrine. This led them to focus their activities on venues promoting Catalan nationalism, such as independentist gatherings, along with establishments like sex shops, gay bars and saunas, and abortion clinics, which they vehemently opposed on moral grounds.

== History ==
=== 1985–1986 ===
Milícia Catalana used as emblem the Bandera cruzada, an identical variant of the Estelada with the star being replaced by a cross potent. The flag was later used by the MPC.

Milícia Catalana was founded on 24 August 1985 in Catalonia, with a founding group composed of Carlos Francisoud Araguas, Juan Carlos Criado Guasch, and Jorge Laborda Porta, among others. The organization emerged from local traditionalist Catholic circles in Barcelona, including individuals associated with the Parroquia de San Félix Africano, associated with the Lefebvrist movement, and the Hermandad Sacerdotal Española. Its precursor nucleus also included Catholics who mobilized against the screening of Hail Mary, a controversial film by Jean-Luc Godard that distorted and slandered themes of the Christian faith.

On 27 August 1985, three days after its founding, MC first came to public attention after a member left an explosive at the headquarters of the separatist group Crida a la Solidaritat in Barcelona. Subsequently, the group began a campaign of attacks in Barcelona directed against targets deemed as hostile to Catholic tradition, as well as Catalonian separatists. On 5 September 1985, an explosive was planted at the Oasis sauna on Carrier Balmes, an attack that the group later claimed. Four days after, MC left a bomb in an erotic bookshop on Carrer de la Diputació, injuring the owner and an employee. The actions of Milícia Catalana continued during July 1986, as it carried a series of operations against bars, saunas and homosexual establishments in Barcelona during the earlier days of the month. By 14 July 1986, MC had a reported number of 15 attacks, with the last one being a Molotov cocktail attack against the Catalanist bookshop of Joan Ballester that same day.

On 17 July 1986, two members of Milícia Catalana, Juan Carlos Criado and Carlos Francisoud, executed a bombing at the Girona headquarters of the Moviment d'Esquerra Nacionalista (MEN), a far-left separatist organization. The bomb destroyed the MEN headquarters, but there were no fatalities or personal injuries. Criado was identified by three members of the Crida, who recognized him from the Crida attack in 1985. The perpetrators were later arrested after a pursuit, and the group’s first period of activities came to an end. During their detention, both members were totally cut off from communication, and on July 25, 1986, both Criado and Francisoud were imprisoned in Modelo prison and La Trinitat prison, respectively.

== See also ==
- Catalan Patriotic Movement
- Terra Lliure

== Sources ==
- Borràs, Jordi (31 May 2016). "Diccionari de l'extrema dreta a Catalunya, de la A a la Z". Crític (in Catalan).
- ——— (6 June 2016). "Diccionario de la extrema derecha catalana de la A a la Z". Kaos en la red (in Spanish).
- Cantarero, Joan (19 June 2015). "Los Mossos vinculan al neonazi Frías con herederos de la banda Milícia Catalana". Público (in Spanish). Madrid.
- Casals, Xavier (2006). Ultracatalunya: l'extrema dreta a Catalunya: de l'emergència del búnker al rebuig de les mesquites (1966 - 2006) (1 ed.). Barcelona: L'Esfera dels Llibres. ISBN 978-84-9734-537-8.
- "La Lucha Armada: Un Factor a Considerar". Combat (in Spanish). No. 1. Catalonia: Milícia Catalana. 1990. p. 1.
- "El Creciente Apoyo Social a Milícia Catalana, Causa de Preocupación del Gobierno". Combat (in Spanish). No. 1. Catalonia: Milícia Catalana. 1990. p. 4.
- "1989. Un Año Cerrado con un Balance Militar muy Positivo". Combat (in Spanish). No. 1. Catalonia: Milícia Catalana. 1990. p. 5.
- "Quinto Aniversario de la Fundación de Milícia Catalana". Combat (in Spanish). No. 2. Catalonia: Milícia Catalana. 1991. p. 1.
- "L'alcaldable de PxC a Badalona és un històric antiindependentista condemnat a 8 anys i mig de presó". Directe!cat (in Catalan). La República. 21 April 2011. Archived from the original on 18 June 2021.
- "Milícia Catalana". enciclopedia.cat (in Catalan). Enciclopèdia.cat.
- "El fiscal pide 22 años de prisión para dos miembros de Milícia Catalana". EFE (in Spanish). Ediciones El País, S.L. 1 August 1988.
- Esteban, Nacho (2023). Por rojos y maricones: homofobia y transfobia en el Partido Popular y el resto de la derecha española (Primeraición ed.). Barcelona: Egales. ISBN 978-84-19728-03-6.
- "El Supremo confirma la pena al responsible del grupo ultra Milícia Catalana". El Mundo. 6 January 1997.
- "Dos heridos en el atentado a una librería barcelonesa". El País (in Spanish). 10 September 1985.
- "Ultraderechistas atacan bares de 'top-less' y de homosexuales en Barcelona". El País (in Spanish). 4 July 1986.
- "Detenidos cinco presuntos miembros de una banda 'ultra' llamada Milicia Catalana". El País (in Spanish). 23 November 1991.
- "Reconocidos los presuntos miembros de Milicia Catalana" (PDF). Diari de Girona (in Spanish). No. 13360. 20 July 1986. p. 9.
- Roig, Higínia (2 September 2009). "GAL, droga i ultradreta al port del Fòrum" (PDF). Directa (in Catalan). No. 150. Sant Adrià de Besòs. p. 11.
- "Efemèrides". Girona Notícies (in Spanish).
- "La Policía Desarticula en Barcelona el Grupo Terrorista de Ultraderecha Milícia Catalana". Servimedia (in Spanish). Barcelona. 22 November 1991.
- "Los dos miembros de Milicia Catalana ingresan en prisión" (PDF). La Vanguardia (in Spanish). No. 150. 26 July 1986. p. 22.
- "Madrugada de bombas ultra en Barcelona, Manresa y Sant Boi". La Vanguardia (in Spanish). Barcelona. p. 18. Archived from the original on 4 March 2016.
- Montagut, Albert (15 July 1986). "Dos nuevos atentados en Barcelona del grupo terrorista 'ultra' Milicia Catalana". El País (in Spanish). Barcelona.
- Mendizàbal, Enric (2023). "De la passió i dels perills de comprar i vendre llibres a Barcelona" [On the Passion and Dangers of Buying and Selling Books in Barcelona]. Treballs de la Societat Catalana de Geografia (in Catalan) (96). Universitat Autònoma de Barcelona: 67–106. doi:10.2436/20.3002.01.24242. ISSN 2014-0037.
- Prieto, Joaquín; Sales, Ferran (10 December 1989). "El grupo 'ultra' Bases Autónomas anuncia nuevas acciones "contra el régimen"". El País. Madrid.
- Sánchez, Mariano; Vázquez, Manuel (1996). Los Hijos del 20-N: Historia Violenta del Fascismo Español. Madrid: Temas de Hoy. ISBN 978-8478807000.
- Sánchez, Mariano (2010). "Compendio de Siglas". La transición sangrienta: una historia violenta del proceso democrático en España, 1975-1983 (in Spanish). Spain: Península. ISBN 978-84-9942-001-1.
- ——— (13 October 2022). La larga marcha ultra: Desde la muerte de Franco a Vox (1975-2022) (in Spanish). Spain: Roca Editorial. ISBN 978-84-19283-32-0.
- Santacatalina, Enric (2018). "Terra Lliure". L'independentisme armat i violent a Catalunya (1965-1995). El repte de les fonts orals (PDF). Catalonia: Institut Nárcis Monturiol.
