= Stadspark, Groningen =

Park in the Netherlands

Coordinates: 53°12′10.8″N 6°32′24″E

Stadspark
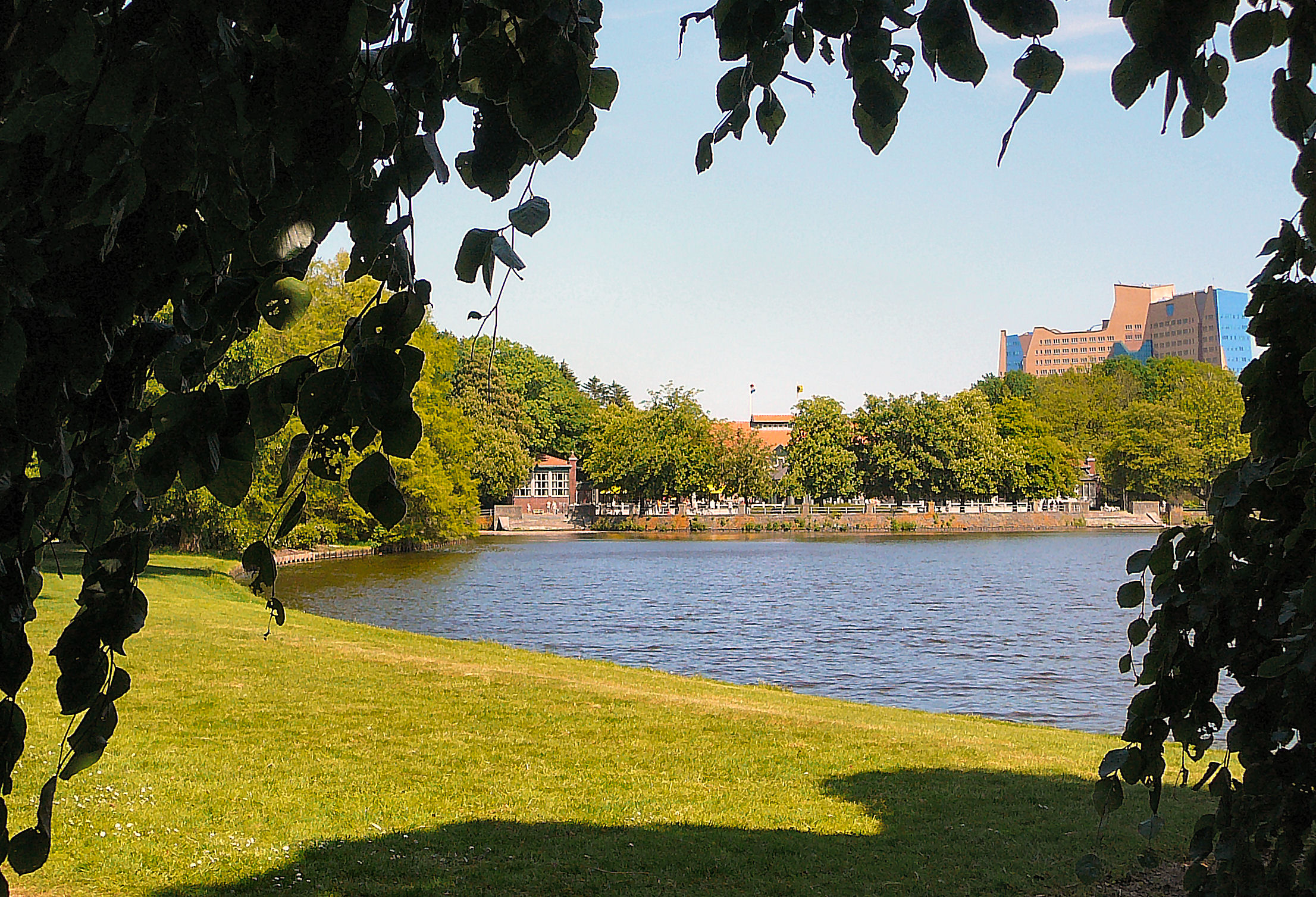
- Stadspark, Groningen with Gasunie Building in the background

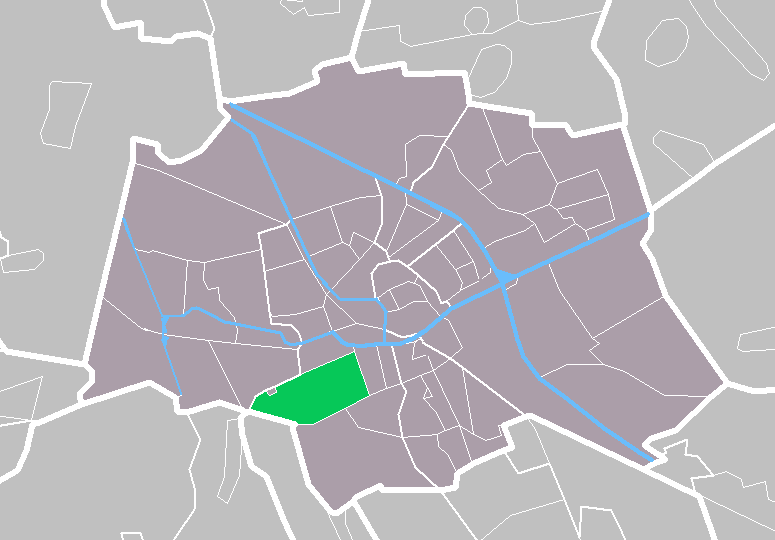
- Type: urban park
- Location: Groningen
- Area: 140 ha
- Opening: 1926

The Stadspark (City Park) is an urban public park in Groningen, The Netherlands.

Inspired by the City Beautiful movement, in 1909 a local businessman founded an association in order to collect funds for a public park in the city. Construction of the park started in 1913 and was completed in 1926. Within the park an arboretum and a petting zoo can be found. There was a horse racing venue, but this has been closed in 2021 to allow for more concerts to be organised in the park.

== Concerts ==
Concerts at Stadspark Groningen
Date	Artist	Tour	Attendance
2 June 1999	The Rolling Stones	No Security Tour	75,000
18 July 2000	Tina Turner	Twenty Four Seven Tour	65,000
22 June 2019	Sting	My Songs Tour	
22 June 2022	Green Day; Fall Out Boy; Weezer	Hella Mega Tour	35,000
23 June 2022	Guns N' Roses	We're F'N' Back! Tour	52,140
6 July 2023	Rammstein	Rammstein Stadium Tour	110,000
7 July 2023	Rammstein	Rammstein Stadium Tour	110,000
2 September 2023	Armin van Buuren	Hullabaloo Festival	
25 September 2026	Noordpool orkest Bert Visscher; Inge van Calkar; Tiktok Tammo; TaxiTaxi	Stadspark 100 jaar	
