= Antonio Llardén =

Spanish businessperson

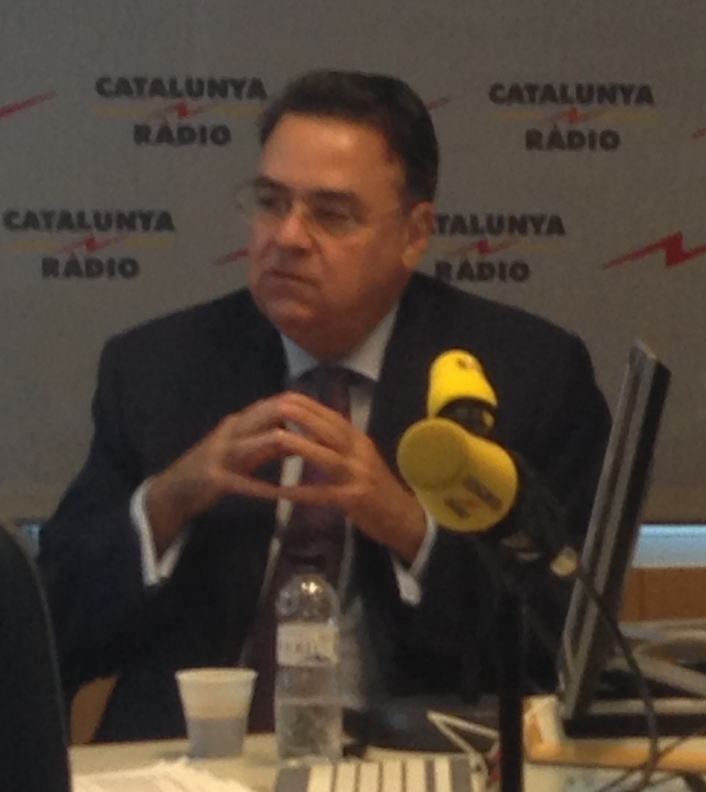
Antonio Llarden

Antonio Llardén Carratalá (born 1951) is a Spanish entrepreneur. He is the Executive Chairman of Enagás, the main carrier of natural gas in Spain and the Technical Manager of the Spanish Gas System. The company has presence in Mexico, Chile and Peru, and participates in the European project Trans Adriatic Pipeline. It is also certified as independent TSO European Union, which homologates the company to gas transmission network operators of other European countries.

== Biography ==
Antonio Llardén Carratalá was born in Barcelona, Spain, in 1951. He has a master's degree in Industrial Engineering from the Polytechnic University of Catalonia and he passed the public examinations and entered into the Superior Corps of State Functionaries.

Llardén has wide-ranging experience in the business world. He started his career in the consulting sector, in Ingenieros Consultores S.A. Over the course of his professional life, he has held different positions of great responsibility, especially in the infrastructure and energy sectors. He is married with one son.

== Career ==
Antonio Llardén serves as the Executive Chairman of Enagás, the technical manager of the Spanish gas system and the nation's primary natural gas transmission operator. In addition, he is a Member of the Board of Directors and the Executive Board of the Spanish Energy Club. Additionally, he chairs the Sustainable Energy and Environmental Foundation (Funseam), an entity that coordinates research and alignment among the principal operators in Spain's energy market. On a macroeconomic level, he contributes to national corporate strategy as a member of the CEOE Business Action Council.

Beyond his industrial responsibilities, he is integrated into several strategic and cultural organizations. He is a sponsor of the Real Instituto Elcano de Estudios Internacionales y Estratégicos, a European think tank specializing in international and strategic studies, and participates in the Business Leadership Forum. His involvement in the Spanish cultural sector includes sponsorship of the Escuela Superior de Música Reina Sofía and a seat on the Board of Protectores del Teatro Real and of its Monitoring Committee.

The majority of his executive background was developed within the Gas Natural-Repsol Group, holding various senior positions, including serving as the Chief Executive Officer of Gas Natural Latinoamericana - a joint corporate venture between Repsol and Gas Natural - and later as the Chief Corporate Officer of the Gas Natural Group. Between 2001 and 2007, was chairman of the Board of Directors of Sedigas, an association comprising companies related to the gas sector in Spain. Internationally, this period coincided with his membership on the Board of Directors of Eurogas and his participation in the executive committee of the International Gas Union (IGU), where he represented Spanish interests in global energy policy.

Antonio Llardén brought forward a 4,000 million euros investment plan that was set to be realised between 2007 and 2012, in order to increase the gas pipeline network and expand the plants in Barcelona, Huelva and Cartagena.

In this context, he was a member of Policy Advisory Network of International Chamber of Commerce (ICC) and was part of its Commission on Environment and Energy. In addition, he was a member of High Level Group on the South West Regional Energy Market of the European Commission.

Llardén was the Dean of the College of Engineers, as well as a member of the Social Council of the Autonomous University of Barcelona and Chairman of its Economics Committee.

Also, he was a member of the board of directors of Instituto Nacional de Industria, Instituto de Crédito Oficial (ICO), Telefónica, Enresa and Caixa Catalunya. In 1992, he took part of Barcelona Olympic Games as well.

Antonio Llardén also regularly gives Master Lectures for postgraduates at Universities and Business Schools, like IESE Business School, IE Business School, ESADE or University of Deusto.
