= Gasunie Building =

- Gasuniegebouw
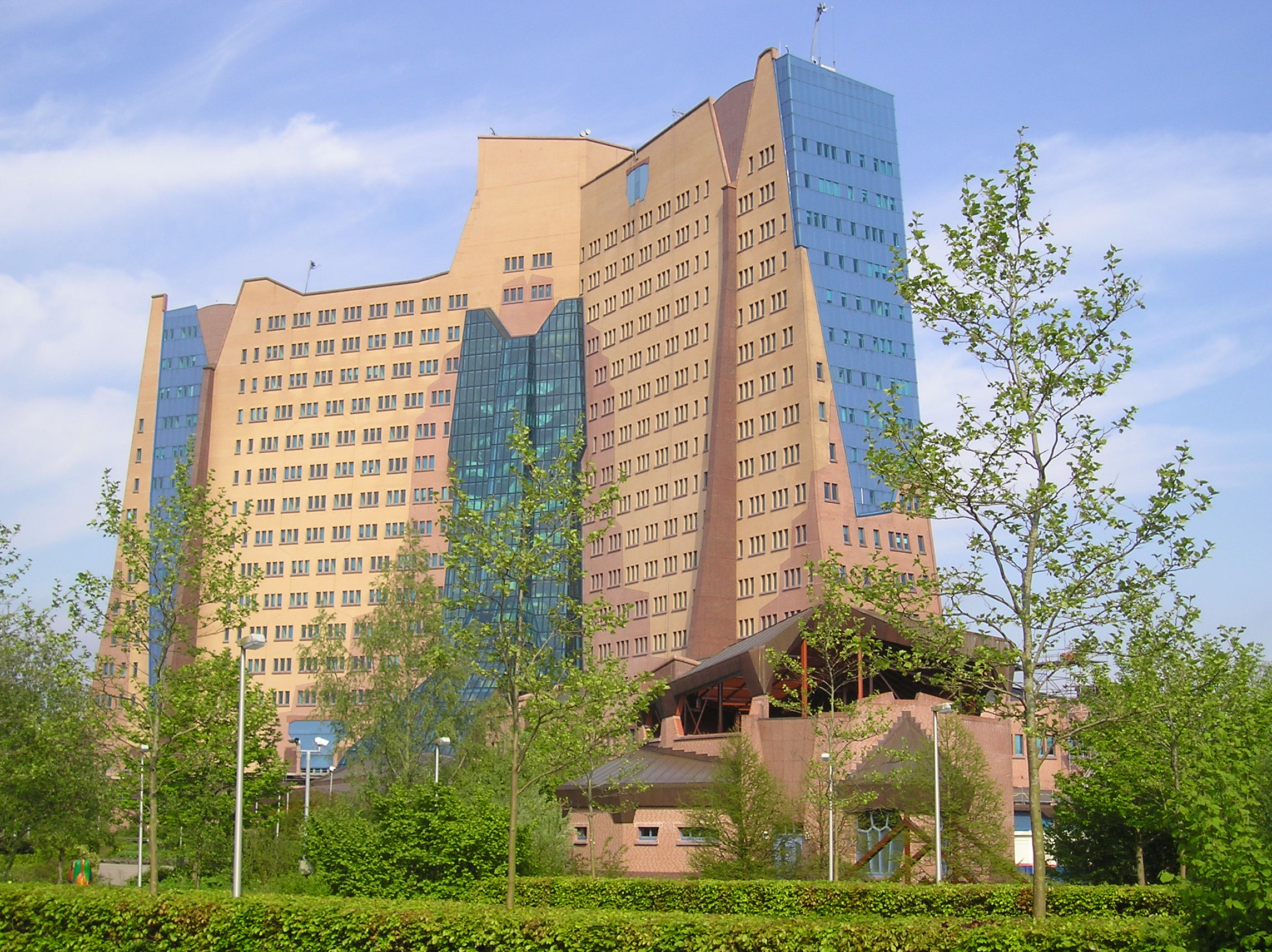
- The building in 2008

- Location within Netherlands

General information
- Location: Concourslaan 17, Groningen, The Netherlands
- Coordinates: 53°12′4″N 6°33′5″E
- Current tenants: Gasunie
- Topped-out: 1 December 1992
- Completed: 18 March 1994
- Opened: 28 March 1994
- Inaugurated: 22 April 1994
- Cost: ƒ140.000.000

Height
- Height: 89 metres (292 ft)

Dimensions
- Other dimensions: 13 metres (43 ft)

Technical details
- Floor area: 45,000 square metres (480,000 sq ft)
- Grounds: 9,500 square metres (102,000 sq ft)

Design and construction
- Architecture firm: Alberts & Van Huut

Other information
- Parking: 40,000 square metres (430,000 sq ft)

Website
- www.gasunie.nl/over-gasunie/gasunie-gebouw

The Gasunie Building is one of the most famous buildings in Groningen, Netherlands. It was built as a headquarters for Gasunie and was officially opened on 22 April 1994 by Queen Beatrix of the Netherlands. The building has 18 floors and is 89 metres (292 ft) high, which makes it the third tallest building in Groningen, the first being the Martinitoren. It is in the south of the city, on the edge of the Stadspark and right next to the main highways.

== History ==
The old Gasunie building facilities could not meet the needs of growing number of the employees. After evaluation of economic and practical issues, it was decided to build a new building. The project started in 1989 with selecting a suitable site and creating a list of requirements, which architects should have implemented in their proposals.

== Architecture ==
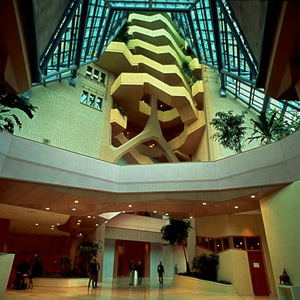
Gasunie foyer

The design of the building was developed by Alberts and Van Huut architects bureau and is considered to be a great example of ‘organic building’. There are two distinct parts in the building: high-rise section with offices and low-rise section with meeting rooms and service facilities. One of the main features of the building is its unique stairwell with glass ‘waterfall’ which is 60 metres (200 ft) high and 40 metres (130 ft) wide. The floors of the building are visually linked by this glass wall, which creates a sense of unity and space.
