= Federico Jiménez Losantos =

Spanish journalist

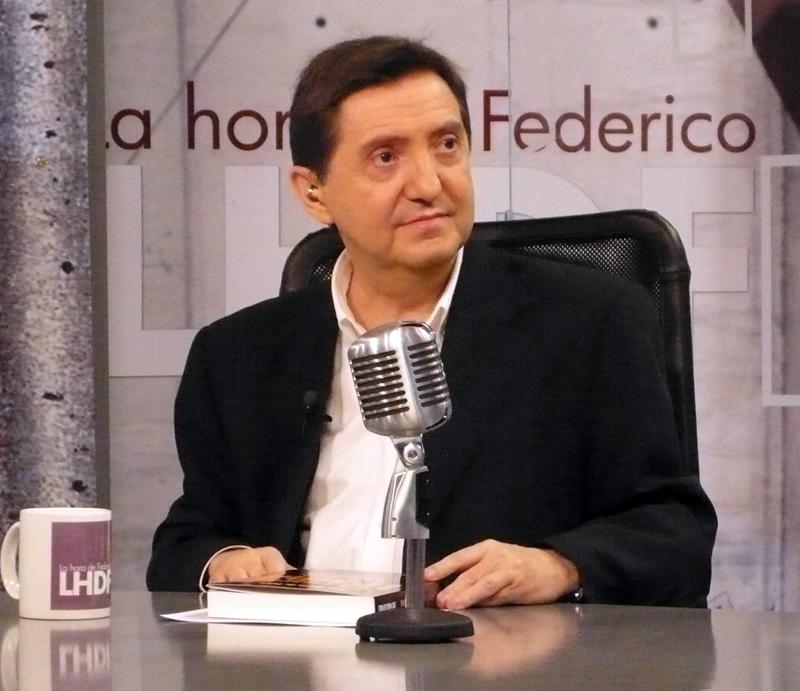
- Jiménez Losantos (2009)
- Born: Federico Jorge Jiménez Losantos; 15 September 1951 (age 74); Orihuela del Tremedal, Spain
- Education: University of Barcelona
- Occupations: Radio presenter, pundit, opinion writer, author, media entrepreneur, high school literature teacher

Federico Jorge Jiménez Losantos (born 15 September 1951), also known by his initials FJL, (Note: Also referred to as "Federico" or "Don Federico" among his followers.) is a Spanish radio presenter and right-wing pundit, being most known for his successful radio talk show Es la mañana de Federico. He is also a TV host and literary and non-fiction author. A member of extreme-left organizations and participant in Barcelona's counter-cultural scene in the 1970s, he experienced a radical rightward drift, eventually becoming a journalistic guru for a far-right audience.

== Early life ==
Born in Orihuela del Tremedal, Teruel, on 15 September 1951, to a family of educators. He studied at a high school in Teruel, where he was a student of José Antonio Labordeta (who reportedly considered Losantos "like a son" at the time and later wondered about his personal "transformation") and José Sanchis Sinisterra. He was a resident at Colegio Menor "San Pablo", and earned a silver medal of Student Merit and the third class of the "Colegio Pizarro" literary award.

Jiménez Losantos arrived to Barcelona at age 20, and he studied Philosophy and Letters (section Romance Philology) at the University of Barcelona, earning a licentiate degree by reading a dissertation about Valle Inclán. He was a member of Bandera Roja and the PSUC during his spell in Barcelona. Disenchanted as result of a journey to Maoist China and the reading of The Gulag Archipelago, he distanced himself from communism in 1976.

Together with Alberto Cardín, he founded Revista de Literatura (1974)—the "most Lacanian" publication at the time in Spain— and Diwan (1978).

Literature and language teacher at a high school in Santa Coloma de Gramenet and one of the promoters of the so-called "Manifesto of the 2,300" denouncing the alleged "intention to make Catalan the only official language of Catalonia", he was kidnapped by Terra Lliure in 1981; after being gagged and shot at the leg by Pere Bascompte in a wasteland in Esplugues de Llobregat, Losantos was left abandoned and tied to a tree by the kidnappers.

He left Catalonia and moved to Madrid after the attack. He worked as a literature teacher at the Instituto Lope de Vega high school in the Spanish capital.

== Career in journalism ==
He was hired as Op-Ed Editor of the Diario 16 newspaper. He then worked for Antena 3 Radio, and later for the COPE radio network of the Spanish Catholic church. After a year in Miami, he returned to Spain and took charge of La Linterna, a night programme on COPE radio. In 2003 he became director of La Mañana, also on COPE, and became increasingly popular in the morning radio. With La Mañana he became one of the most listened-to radio talk show hosts in Spain until he parted ways in July 2009.

He was one of the founders of La Ilustración Liberal magazine.

In 2000, together with the likes of Javier Rubio Navarro, José María Marco, Alberto Recarte, Carlos Rodríguez Braun and Pedro Schwartz, Losantos helped to create Libertad Digital, a markedly partisan right-leaning and anti-socialist online newspaper. Half of the seed capital was provided by the Grupo Intereconomía, with which later on he had a very public and acrimonious falling out.

He is also a regular columnist for El Mundo and has written several books, mostly on political topics. He also debuted in poetry with a book of haikus. In 2005 he started 'The Spain Herald', an English-language digest of articles from Libertad Digital which has been off-line since June 2006.

He has been successfully prosecuted on a number of occasions for defamatory pronouncements. Including a quarrel filed by Alberto Ruiz-Gallardón, (Note: Found guilty of verbal offence against the mayor of Madrid, Alberto Ruiz Gallardon, he received a fine for having called him a traitor towards terror victims of 11-M. His answer was that "Gallardon's honour was cheap after all".) and being legally prompted, along with his employers COPE, to pay compensation of 60,000 euros to Esquerra Republicana de Catalunya. In 2009, after the discomfort that Losantos' outspoken and uncompromising editorial line was creating in the COPE (deeply critical of the former Spanish premier Zapatero, but, somewhat surprisingly for Spain's partisan politics, equally critical of the conservative opposition, which he chastises as being bland and lacking a real alternative project), he did not accept the new role he was offered by this radio station and announced he was moving, among others, to create his own radio station, esRadio, to be launched in September of that same year.

Losantos received the Antena de Oro award in 2022.

== Ideology and views ==
He was one of the figures from among the Conservative camp (along, for example, José María Aznar) who tried to vindicate the figure of Manuel Azaña in the mid-1990s, partially justified by the bad feelings of the republican politician towards the so-called "peripheral nationalisms".

He has acrimoniously derided the left-wing political parties in Spain for an alleged renouncement to the "idea of Spain" and lack of State project. A harsh opponent of Catalan nationalism, he has decried language policy in Catalonia as a "cultural genocide". He has fiercely criticised the cultural policies implemented by the regional administrations of the autonomous communities of Spain.

He was among the leading public figures promoting the conspiracy theory about the authorship of the 11-M terrorist attacks in Madrid in 2004, and he even got to the point of purging critics of the conspiracy theory off from the informative services of COPE.

He endorsed Rosa Díez in the campaign for the 2011 general election.

He has declared to be an atheist. (Note: Thus, for a time, the two leading radio personalities of COPE (the radio owned by the Spanish Catholic bishops) were an atheist (Losantos) and a protestant (César Vidal).) In 2021, he had a row with the anti-vax movement whom he deemed as "ultracarcas bebedores de lejía" (roughly translating to 'ultra-fuddy-duddy bleach drinkers') and claimed that "murderers" are "those who do not vaccinate their children and deny that vaccines save lives".

== Style ==
His style has been described as "vehement and aggressive". He has been noted by his ability to create hurtful nicknames to deride his "enemies". He regularly uses the stylistic device of relating the meteorological situation at a given time to the ongoing affairs in Spain.

== Works ==
Essays

- — (1979). Lo que queda de España. Barcelona: Ajoblanco.
- — (1993). La dictadura silenciosa. Mecanismos totalitarios en nuestra democracia. Madrid: Temas de Hoy.
- — (1994). La última salida de Manuel Azaña. Barcelona: Planeta.
- — (2004). El adiós de Aznar. Barcelona: Planeta.
- — (2006). De la noche a la mañana. El milagro de la Cope. Madrid: La Esfera de los Libros.
- — (2007). La ciudad que fue. Barcelona años 70. Madrid: Temas de Hoy.
- — (2011). El linchamiento. Madrid: La Esfera de los libros.
- — (2018). Memoria del comunismo. De Lenin a Podemos. Madrid: La Esfera de los Libros.
