= Borja Prado =

Spanish businessman

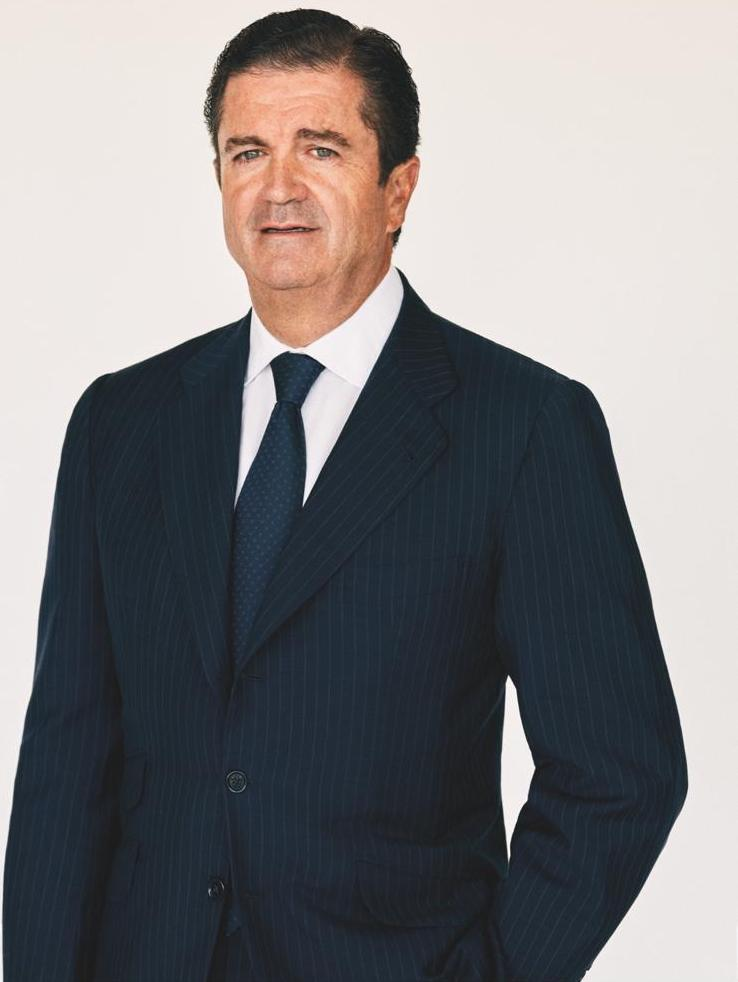
- Prado in 2014
- Born: Francisco de Borja Prado Eulate; 1956 (age 69–70); Madrid, Spain
- Education: Autonomous University of Madrid
- Occupation: Businessman
- Employer: Endesa
- Known for: President of Spanish media company Mediaset España
- Father: Manuel Prado y Colón de Carvajal

Francisco de Borja Prado Eulate (born 1956), is a Spanish businessman currently serving as President of Spanish Media company Mediaset España. He has also served as chairman of Endesa.

== Early life and education ==
Francisco de Borja Prado Eulate was born in Madrid in 1956, son to businessman and diplomat Manuel Prado y Colón de Carvajal (best known as the administrator of Juan Carlos I), and to María Paloma Eulate y Aznar, Marquise of Zuya after 1993. He is a descendant of Christopher Columbus.

He studied at the Colegio Retamar. He studied law at the Autonomous University of Madrid. Borja continued his studies in Foreign Affairs and International Trade in the US, where he attended the New York University, and then at the firm Philip Brothers.

== Career ==
He was vice President of Enersis (2013–2015); Chairman of Mediobanca for Iberia and Latin America (2007–2014); Director of Endesa and Endesa Chile (2007–2009); Vice President of Lazard Asesores Financieros, S.A. (1999 and 2007); Director of Rothschild Spain (1995–1999); Vice President of UBS Spain (1989–1994); Chairman of Almagro Asesoramiento e Inversiones, S.A.; and Fomento de Comercio Exterior (Spanish Foreign Trade Agency) from 1980 to 1988.

Since 2010, Borja has been Chairman of Endesa S.A., a Spanish company linked to the Italian multinational Enel. Chairman of Global Coverage de Mediobanca. Member of the Trilateral Commission and Chairman of the Endesa Foundation. Borja also sits on several Boards of Directors for companies such as Mediaset España Comunicación, S.A.^{[6]} and Enel Iberoamérica, S.R.L.

He has served as Chairman of Endesa, S.A., Chairman of Global Coverage at Mediobanca. A member of the Spanish Group of the Trilateral Commission and Chairman of the Endesa Foundation. Likewise, he sits on other boards such as those of Mediaset España Comunicación, S.A. and Enel Iberoamérica, S.R.L.

In 2016, Prado was appointed as the Chairman of the Spanish Energy Club (Enerclub).

In 2019, Endesa appointed Juan Sánchez-Calero as the new chairman in replacement of Prado.

In 2022, Prado was appointed as the Chairman of Mediaset España in replacement of Alejandro Echevarría.

== Recognition ==
- Tiépolo Award (2012)
- Doctor Honoris Causa by Alfonso X University (2018)
