= Madrid airline office attacks =

Terrorist attacks perpetrated in Madrid on July 1, 1985

- Location: Madrid, Spain
- Date: 1 July 1985
- Target: Airline offices
- Attack type: Bombing, shooting, terrorist attack
- Weapons: Bomb, submachine guns, grenades
- Deaths: 1
- Injuries: 29

On 1 July 1985, in an attack that had targeted the American Trans World Airlines offices in Madrid, Spain, the British Airways offices in the floor below were bombed, killing a woman and wounding 27 people, most of them Spanish. The bombing was followed up minutes later when gunmen opened fire with submachine guns on the Alia Royal Jordanian Airline offices some hundred yards away, injuring two people by shattered glass. Up to three grenades were thrown at the office, but failed to explode or were defused.

Responsibility for the attack was immediately claimed by an Arabic-speaking caller in Beirut claiming to represent the "Organization of the Oppressed" in response to Ronald Reagan having threatened to strike at terrorists following the recent hijacking of TWA Flight 847 (claimed by a similarly named Hezbollah-linked front), and linked to Reagan's intervention on 30 June to have the remaining 39 American hostages released. The attack was also linked to the recent sentencing in Spain of two Shiites to 23 years in prison for the attack on a Libyan diplomat the previous year.

The attacks have been attributed by several sources to the Abu Nidal Organization.

== See also ==
- El Descanso bombing
- 1985 Frankfurt airport bombing
- 1985 Rome and Vienna airport attacks
