= Gasunie =

Dutch natural gas company

N.V. Nederlandse Gasunie

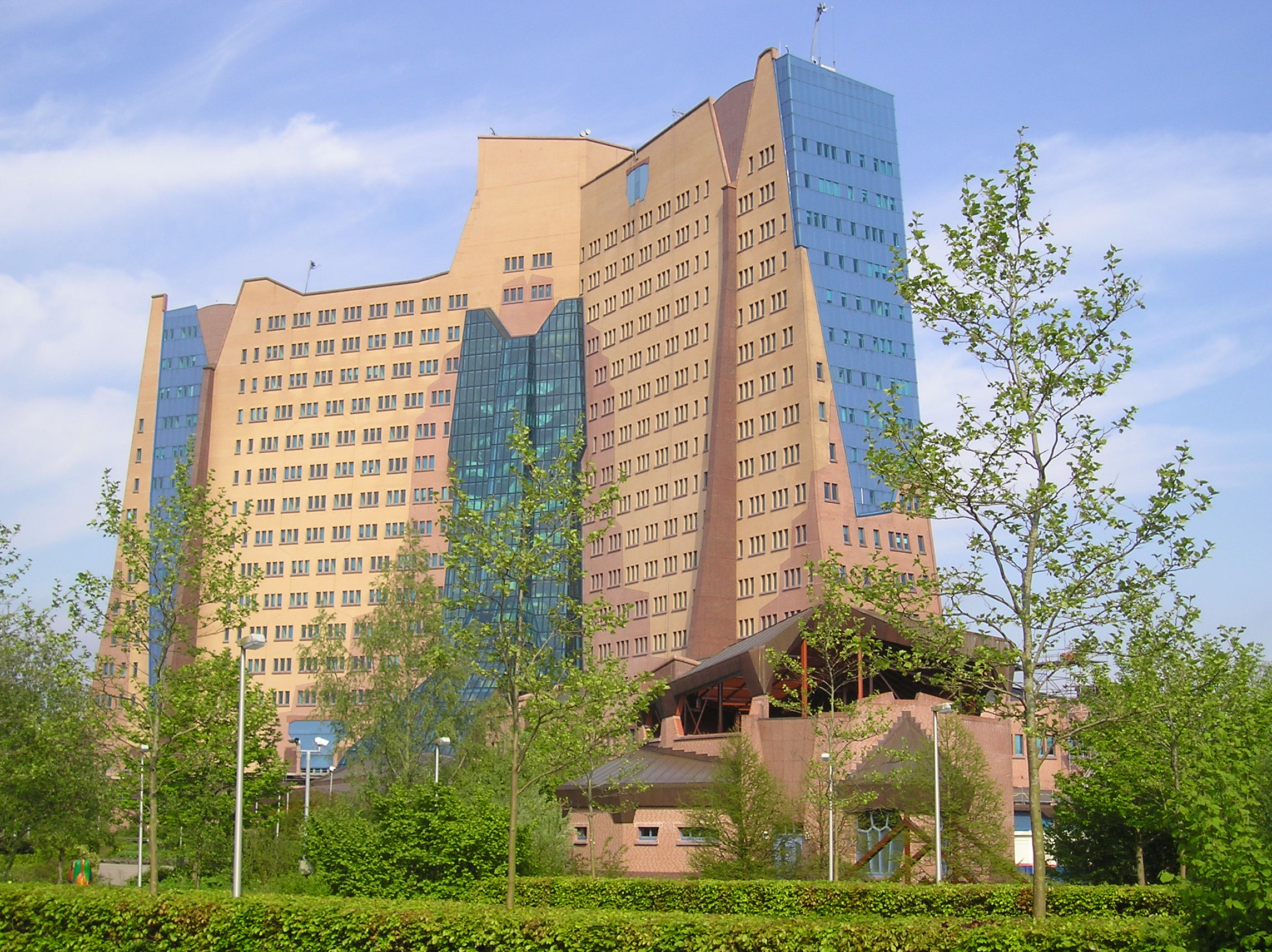
- Gasunie headquarters in the city of Groningen
- Company type: Naamloze Vennootschap; state-owned company
- Industry: energy
- Founded: 1963
- Headquarters: Groningen, The Netherlands
- Area served: Netherlands, Germany
- Key people: Willemien Terpstra (CEO)
- Services: natural gas transportation
- Revenue: ▲€1,506 million (2009)
- Number of employees: 1,448
- Website: gasunie.nl/en/

N.V. Nederlandse Gasunie (short form: Gasunie) is a Dutch natural gas infrastructure and transportation company operating in the Netherlands and Germany. Gasunie owns the Netherlands gas transmission network with a total length of over 12,000 kilometres (7,500 mi) and 3,100 kilometres (1,900 mi) long network in Germany.

== History ==
Gasunie was founded in 1963 as a public-private partnership of Royal Dutch Shell (25%), ExxonMobil (25%) and the state of the Netherlands (50%) to sell and distribute natural gas from the then recently discovered gasfield in the province of Groningen.

In 2005 the company was divided into a gas trading company (now called GasTerra) and a gas transportation company which kept the name Gasunie. The latter owns and operates most of the Dutch gas transmission network as well as the former BEB pipeline network in Germany, and a major pipeline connecting The Netherlands with the United Kingdom called the BBL Pipeline. In 2005, the split of Gasunie took place through a buy out by the Dutch State of the shares held by Shell and ExxonMobil in the infrastructure part of Gasunie. Therefore, Gasunie is now 100% state owned. The Dutch Ministry of Finance represents the Government's shareholder interest. Ownership of GasTerra is divided the same way as Gasunie before 2005.

At the end of October 2010, Gasunie became a 25% shareholder in the Rotterdam-based company Rotterdamse Cintra Maatschappij B.V. Cintra is exploring the possibilities for developing services for the transport of CO_{2} from emitter to storage operator in Rotterdam.

Gasunie established Vertogas on 2 July 2009 for the purpose of issuing certificates which guarantee the origin and volume produced of green gas.

In January 2011 Gasunie Zuidwending became operational. This is a new underground storage facility in Zuidwending, the north of the Netherlands.

In 2007, Gasunie bought the BEB's transportation unit BEB Erdgas und Erdoel GmbH, a German natural gas pipeline network operator, from Royal Dutch Shell and ExxonMobil.

In September 2019, it was announced that Gasunie will be developing two pipelines based on independent heat transport management. The pipes will be installed for the transport of heat from the port of Rotterdam to the region of The Hague. Gasunie is taking over this project from Eneco. The heat transport pipeline will become a regulated transport network to which various suppliers of heat sources and consumers can connect on the basis of transparent conditions, with Gasunie as independent manager. In South Holland, the construction of a regional heat network can reduce CO_{2} emissions.

In April 2022, Gasunie hired a tanker for a period of five years to convert cargoes of liquefied natural gas (LNG) into gaseous form, after which it can be pumped into the Dutch gas network. A month later, a second contract for a comparable ship followed, also for a period of five years. The two can store liquefied gas in the hold and supply the gas as needed. Both installations are expected to come into operation in the autumn of 2022 and this capacity will reduce dependence on Russian natural gas. The two ships, from Exmar and New Fortress Energy, will be berthed in Eemshaven and together they can supply 8 billion m³ of natural gas. Gasunie has been co-owner of the Gate terminal in Rotterdam for years, a comparable installation, but on land.

== Operations ==
Gasunie is a shareholder of ICE Endex, a European gas spot and derivatives exchange.

Gasunie owns 60% of the BBL Pipeline between the Netherlands and England. It also has 9% of shares in Nord Stream AG, the project company for the Nord Stream 1 pipeline. Gasunie has agreed to have a 20% stake in NEL pipeline which will connect Nord Stream with the German gas system.

Gasunie owns 42.5% of Gate Terminal, the first LNG import terminal in the Netherlands, on the Maasvlakte. Following successful cooperation with GTS, Gate was brought into operation on the planned date of 1 September 2011.

== See also ==
- Gasunie Building
