= GasTerra =

Utility company in the Netherlands

GasTerra B.V.
- Company type: Besloten Vennootschap (private)
- Industry: Energy
- Predecessor: Gasunie
- Founded: Groningen, July 1, 2005
- Headquarters: Groningen, Netherlands
- Key people: Annie Krist (CEO)
- Products: Natural gas
- Services: Natural gas trade and supply
- Revenue: ▲€9.6 billion (2017)
- Net income: ▲€36 million (2017)
- Owner: Royal Dutch Shell, ExxonMobil, the Dutch government
- Number of employees: 176
- Website: www.gasterra.com

GasTerra is a Dutch partially state-owned company that is active in the worldwide trade and supply of natural gas. It is owned by Royal Dutch Shell (25%), ExxonMobil (25%) and the Dutch government (50%). Its history dates back to 2005, when the company was created after a split-up of the Gasunie.

Before 2005, the Gasunie was authorized to both sell and transport natural gas discovered in the Netherlands. Due to the liberalisation of the European gas market, transportation and trade and supply had to be separated into independent companies. In 2005 this separation took place, creating both GasTerra and a natural gas transportation company. The last company kept the original name, Gasunie.

The Netherlands has long been a net exporter of natural gas, but in recent years the national gas supply has fallen faster than demand. The turning point was in 2018, when the Netherlands became a net gas importer in that year. About 10 billion m³ was imported in 2019, mainly due to the extra import of LNG. Due to the accelerated phasing out of the extraction of Groningen natural gas, the company will have to close within a few years. Minister Eric Wiebes announced this on 7 October 2019 in a letter to the House of Representatives. Gas extraction from the Groningen field will cease in 2022, which means that GasTerra's core activity as a sales office for Groningen gas will cease. In September 2020, GasTerra announced that it would stop permanently on December 31, 2024. A social plan has been drawn up for the approximately 165 employees in which compulsory redundancies are prevented as much as possible and employees are guided to new work.

On 26 June 2023 GasTerra stated in a press release that it needs more time to wind down its operations completely. The company’s end date has therefore been amended and was set to be 31 December 2026.
