= 1990 Sabadell bombing =

1990 terrorist incident in Spain

Sabadell bombing
- Part of the Basque conflict
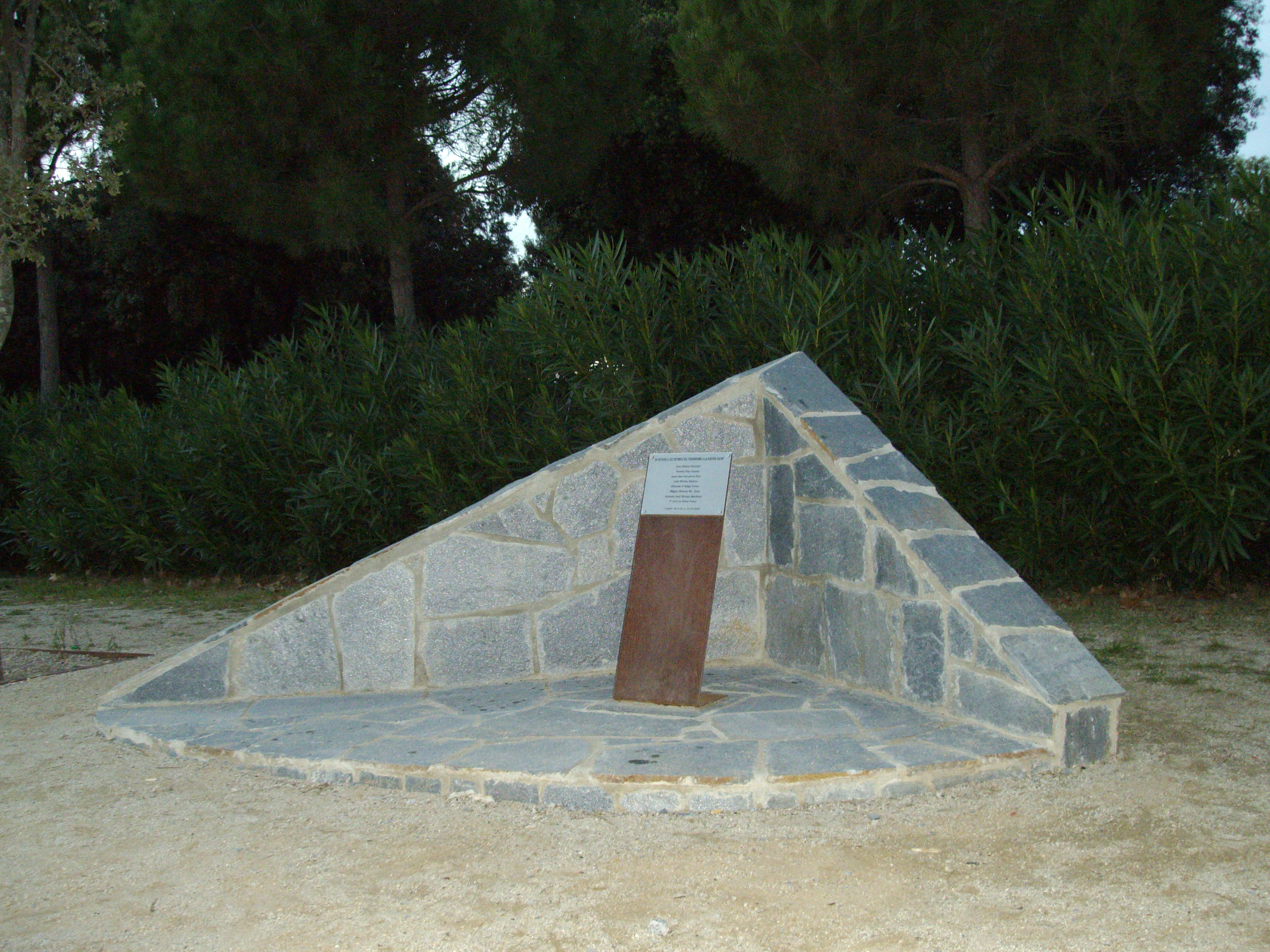
- Memorial plaque for the victims of the attack
- Location: 41.5598195°N 2.1025916944°E; Sabadell, Catalonia, Spain
- Date: 8 December 1990; 1645 (UTC+1)
- Target: Police convoy
- Attack type: Car bomb
- Deaths: 6
- Injuries: 10
- Perpetrator: ETA

A car bombing was carried out by the armed Basque separatist group ETA in Sabadell, Catalonia, Spain on 8 December 1990.

The target was a convoy carrying eight members of the National Police force on the way to police a football game between Sabadell and Málaga CF. Six of the police officers were killed, with the other two injured. Eight civilians were also injured in the attack, which was ETA's deadliest of 1990.

== Background ==
In the early 1990s, ETA had stepped up its attacks in Catalonia in an attempt to gain worldwide publicity and secure political concessions by threatening disruption to the 1992 Summer Olympics in Barcelona. Police had obtained documents revealing these plans in the week before the attack.

Two weeks earlier, on 23 November, ETA had attacked the Guardia Civil barracks in Sant Carles de la Ràpita in Catalonia, though no one had been injured.

== Attack ==
At approximately 13:45 on the day of the attack, ETA placed the car bomb on the junction of Josep Aparici and Ribot i Serra streets, where vehicles would normally have to slow down to pass. The car bomb, located some 500 metres (1,600 ft) from the main police station, was detonated remotely from the nearby Gran Via, the main thoroughfare in the town, from which there was easy access to the A7 motorway, allowing the perpetrators to escape. The bomb caused a large explosion, mostly destroying the second of the two vehicles of the police convoy and caused extensive damage to nearby buildings, with shrapnel found up to 400 metres (1,300 ft) away. Five of the eight police officers in that vehicle were killed instantly, with a sixth dying shortly afterwards. The other two policemen were seriously injured. A further eight passersby also sustained injuries in the attack.

== Bombers ==
Police sources attributed the attack to ETA's Barcelona Commando Unit. They immediately identified Joan Carles Monteagudo and Juan Félix Erezuma, the two suspected leaders of the cell, as participants in the attack. On 30 May 1991, the day after a bomb attack in Vic had killed nine people, Monteagudo and Erezuma were killed in a gunfight with Civil Guard in Lliçà d'Amunt, near Barcelona.
