= Bar Iruña attack =

1987 terrorist incident in Spain

Bar Iruna attack
- Bar Iruña attack (Spain) Bar Iruña attack (Catalonia) Bar Iruña attack (Barcelona) Bar Iruña's location
- Location: 41.3825°N 2.1769°E; Barcelona, Catalonia, Spain
- Date: 26 December 1987; 6:00 pm (UTC+01:00)
- Target: Americans
- Attack type: Bombing
- Weapon: Grenade
- Deaths: 1
- Injuries: 9
- Perpetrator: Catalan separatists

On 26 December 1987, a bomb attack on a United Service Organizations (USO) club in Barcelona, Spain killed an American sailor and injured nine others. The attack, on Bar Iruña, was perpetrated by Catalan nationalist terrorists.

Both Terra Lliure and Catalan Red Liberation Army (ERCA) claimed responsibility. Residents claimed that anti-American slogans and graffiti near the bar at the time suggested the incident was linked to the extension of the Spain-United States military treaty (Pact of Madrid), which was first signed during the tenure of caudillo Francisco Franco in 1953.

Terra Lliure had previously claimed responsibility for an attack on an American consulate in Barcelona in October, which wounded eight sailors. A woman claiming to be from ERCA took responsibility "against an establishment of the Yankee war marines" in a call to news agency EFE. However, the authorities doubted its credibility.

== See also ==
- El Descanso bombing
- 1988 Naples bombing
