= Catalan Red Liberation Army =

The Catalan Red Liberation Army (Catalan: Exèrcit Roig Català d'Alliberament, ERCA) was a militant group seeking greater autonomy for the Catalan region of Spain.

== Activities ==
- 1987, 27 March: Claimed responsibility for a car bombing in Barcelona which killed a Spanish civil guard and injured 15.
- 1987, December: Claimed responsibility for a grenade attack on the Bar Iruna, a USO club in Barcelona, which killed an American sailor. The attack was also claimed by Terra Lliure.
