= 1991 Vic bombing =

1991 terrorist incident in Spain

Coordinates: 41°55′30″N 2°15′14″E

Vic bombing
- Part of the Basque conflict
- Location: Vic, Catalonia, Spain
- Date: 29 May 1991; 19:30 (UTC+1)
- Target: Guardia Civil barracks
- Attack type: Car bomb
- Deaths: 10
- Injuries: 44
- Perpetrator: ETA
- No. of participants: 3

A bombing attack was carried out by the Basque separatist group ETA on 29 May 1991 when a car bomb carrying more than 200 kg of explosive was detonated inside the courtyard of a Civil Guard barracks in the Catalan city of Vic, Spain. The bombing killed 10 people, including five children, and injured 44 people.

Following the selection of Barcelona as the host of the 1992 Olympic Games, ETA launched a series of attacks in Catalonia to gain worldwide attention. Five months earlier, six police officers had been killed in a bomb attack in the city of Sabadell.

The day after the bombing, two members of the ETA cell which carried out the attack were killed by the Civil Guard in a raid on a house at Lliçà d'Amunt, in the Province of Barcelona. Five members of ETA were also arrested.
