= Endesa =

Multinational electric utility company, the largest in Spain

Endesa, S.A.

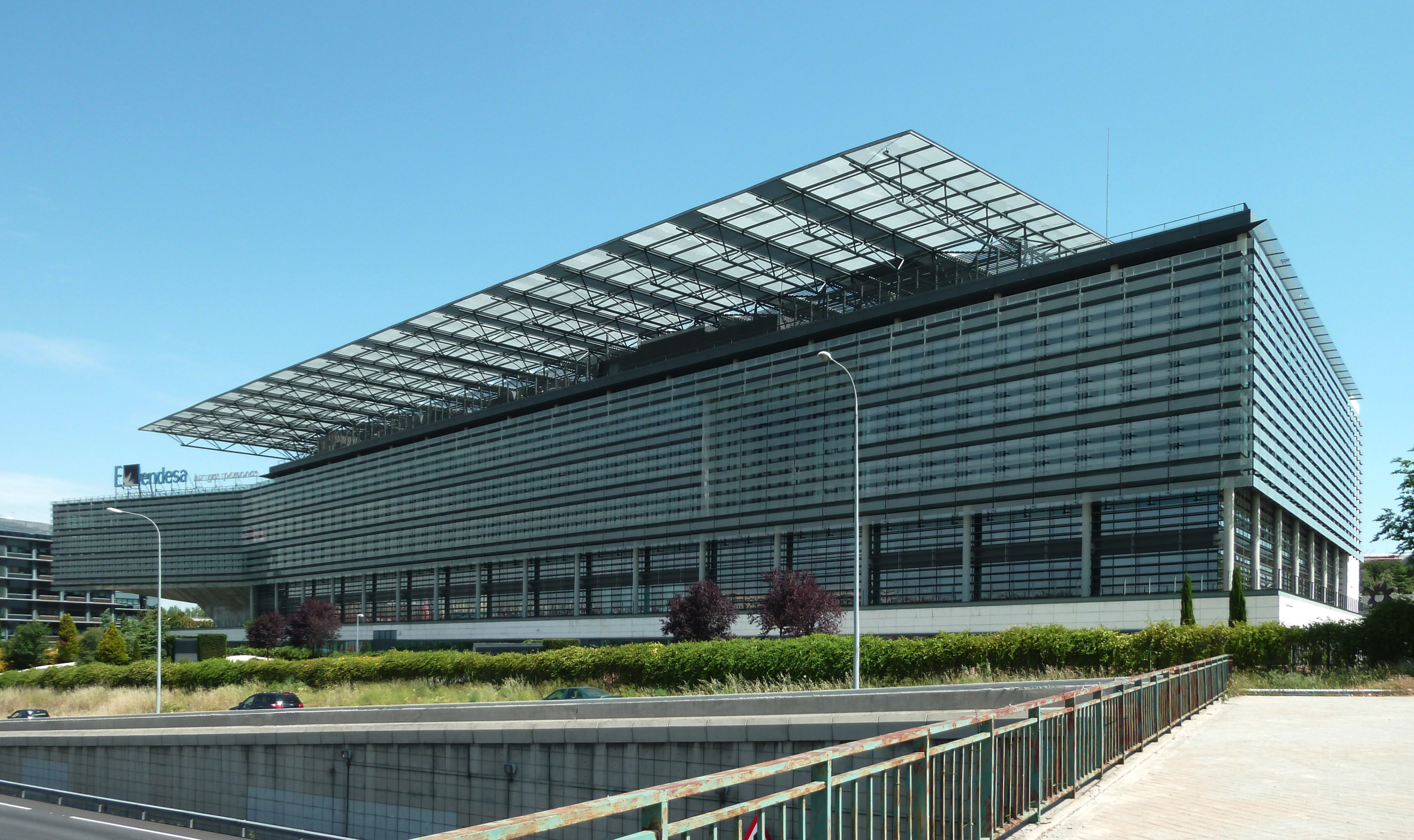
- Headquarters (Madrid, Spain)
- Type: Sociedad Anónima
- Traded as: BMAD: ELE
- ISIN: ES0130670112
- Industry: Public utility
- Founded: 18 November 1944, Ponferrada
- Headquarters: Madrid, Spain
- Key people: Gianni Armani (CEO); Juan Sánchez-Calero (Chairman)
- Services: Electricity generation and distribution
- Revenue: ▲€21.424 billion (2025)
- Operating income: ▼€3.331 billion (2025)
- Net income: ▲€2.198 million (2025)
- Total assets: ▲€37.482 billion (2025)
- Total equity: €1.271 billion (2025)
- Number of employees: ▲8.946 (2025)
- Parent: Enel
- Website: endesa.com

Endesa, S.A. (Spanish pronunciation: [enˈdesa], originally an initialism for Empresa Nacional de Electricidad, S.A.) is a Spanish multinational electric utility company, the largest in the country. The firm, a majority-owned subsidiary of the Italian utility company Enel, has 10 million customers in Spain, with domestic annual generation of over 97,600 GWh from nuclear, fossil-fueled, hydroelectric, and renewable resource power plants. Internationally, it serves another 10 million customers and provides over 80,100 GWh annually. Total customers numbered 22.2 million as of December 31, 2004. It also markets energy in Europe. The company has additional interests in Spanish natural gas and telecommunications companies.

Endesa is one of the three large companies in the electricity sector in Spain, which together with Iberdrola and Naturgy, dominate around 90% of the national electricity market. Endesa has operations in generation, distribution and commercialization of electricity, natural gas and renewable energy through Enel Green Power.

== History ==
The company was formed in 1944 as Empresa Nacional de Electricidad, S.A.; its first president was Esteban Terradas, and its first CEO was Juan Granell Pascual. The company changed its name to Endesa, S.A. in 1997. In September 2004, it took control of the French company SNET (Société nationale d'électricité et de thermique). This was followed by the downsizing of 30% of SNET's employees.

Compostilla I was its first production plant, whose construction began in 1945, being inaugurated in Ponferrada, capital of the Leon region of El Bierzo, on July 28, 1949. The site chosen for the plant, financed with public funds, prioritized the proximity to the national coal quarries, since it meant considerably lowering the supply chain for the power plant, at a time when Spain was living blocked after the Civil War. It was a thermoelectric power plant designed to reduce the dependence that until then had on hydraulic energy in Spain. In 1965, the Compostilla II power station was inaugurated in the bordering municipality of Cubillos del Sil, which replaced Compostilla I in 1972.

At the same time that Endesa began its operations in Ponferrada, the shortage of electricity in specific parts of the country was noted, with no possible short-term solution. At that time, it was thought that the implementation of mobile power plants could solve emergency situations that occurred many times in the Spanish electricity system. For all this, Endesa bought ten mobile units to deal with critical situations with the electricity supply in Seville, Barcelona, Cartagena, Asturias and Mallorca. Thus, the so-called "Electricity Firefighters" were born.

=== Takeover ===
In September 2005, Barcelona-based Gas Natural made a bid for Endesa, whose board unanimously immediately rejected a €23 billion (£16 billion) offer. On January 5, 2006, the Tribunal de Defensa de la Competencia (Competition Court, TDC) blocked the merger of Gas Natural and Endesa because of what it claimed would be irreversible negative impacts on competition. For most of 2006 and 2007, Endesa was the target of rival takeover bids by Germany's E.On and the Italian firm Enel. Despite Gas Natural being half the size of Endesa, its bid was championed by the then-Socialist government as an all-Spanish deal, but Gas Natural decided to withdraw its bid after the German firm E.On offered a higher bid for the company. The opposition People's Party of the day, and some Madrid politicians, criticised the bid, alleging political interference by the Socialists and a Catalan nationalist plot to control energy supply respectively.

On 2 February 2007, E.On offered €38.75 for each share of Endesa. The German firm withdrew its bid two months later in exchange for a promise from rival bidders to sell it part of the Spanish utility's assets. SNET, Endesa Italia and Enel's Viesgo were amongst the business units ultimately sold off to E.On. Acciona and Enel succeeded in their joint bid to acquire Endesa in October 2007 for an estimated €42.5 billion and they announced later that month that they jointly held 92.06% of Endesa's share capital (25.01% Acciona and 67.05% Enel) as a result of their 100% takeover bid launched on Endesa, with the remaining 7.94% being free float.

The two companies initially jointly managed Endesa through an Acciona-controlled holding company which held 50.01% of Endesa's share capital, but in February 2009 Enel agreed to buy out Acciona's stake, taking its total ownership to over 92%. Some Endesa assets will be sold off to Acciona as part of the deal.

As of September 2015, Enel owned 70.1% of Endesa's share capital.

=== Carbon intensity ===
Gross Installed Capacity of Endesa in 2019 (MW).
1. Hydro (23.0%)
2. Combined cycles (27.0%)
3. Other renewables & cogeneration (13.0%)
4. Conventional thermal (20.0%)
5. Nuclear (17.0%)

Year	Production (TWh)	Emission (Mt CO_{2})	g CO_{2}/kWh
2017	78.6	34.5	439
2018	74.2	31	418
2019	61.4	17.31	282

== Enel Green Power Spain ==
Enel Green Power is an Italian multinational that operates in the renewable energy market. The company was incorporated in December 2008 to focus the interests of the Enel Group in the field of renewable energy worldwide.

In 2020 Enel Green Power is present in 27 countries on five continents with a managed capacity of more than 46 GW and more than 1,200 renewable energy plants.

In 2016, Endesa closed the acquisition of 60% with the Enel Group of the part related to the Spanish market of Enel Green Power Spain, considered the fourth operator in the Spanish renewable energy sector and of which it already owned 40%.

The Enel Green Power Spain operating figures are as follows today:

- Power plants: 266 hydroelectric, wind, solar and biomass plants.
- Total GW: 7.4 the capacity managed.
- 49 projects built in 2019.

== Electric vehicle ==
In Europe, Endesa is the only Spanish company involved in the ELVIRE (Electric Vehicle Communication to Infrastructure, Road Services and Electricity Supply) and G4V (Grid for Vehicles) consortia aimed at developing the necessary technology, solutions and services to enable ongoing interaction between drivers, their power suppliers and the smart grid.

The Chairman of Endesa, Borja Prado, together with the mayor of Madrid, Alberto Ruiz Gallardón, and the Chairman of Telefónica, César Alierta, have the phone booth in Madrid which can also be used for recharging electric vehicles. Reserved parking spaces will be located next to this and all other booths set up in Metropolitan areas where users will be able to park their EVs and recharge at no cost once they have obtained their free "zero emissions" pre-paid card from the Madrid city council.

Sustainable mobility to achieve a zero emissions model

In November 2018, started the most ambitious project carried out to date to promote electric mobility in Spain: the Recharging Infrastructures Plan. The objective is to eliminate one of the main barriers when switching to electric mobility access to recharging points. The plan consists of installing 8,500 public recharging points and more than 100,000 private points between 2019 and 2023, so that drivers can comfortably travel around the country in their electric vehicles.

Electric Mobility Plan for Employees

The fifth edition of Electric Mobility Plan for Employees. The purpose is that 200 employees join the 663 that have participated in previous editions. This way, the company expects that in five years 10% of its staff will drive an electric vehicle.

== Board of directors ==
The board of directors of Endesa is composed of the following members:

Position	Member
Chairman	Juan Sánchez-Calero Guilarte
Vice Chairman	Flavio Cattaneo
Chief Executive Officer	Gianni Armani
Member	Guillermo Alonso Olarra
Member	Stefano de Angelis
Member	Gianni Vittorio Armani
Member	Eugenia Bieto Caubet
Member	Elisabetta Colacchia
Member	Ignacio Garralda Ruíz de Velasco
Member	Pilar González de Frutos
Member	Francesca Gostinelli
Member	Francisco de Lacerda
Member	Michela Mossini
Member	Cristina de Parias Halcón
Member	Borja Acha Besga

=== Chairman ===
- Feliciano Fuster (1984-1997)
- Rodolfo Martín Villa (1997-2002)
- Manuel Pizarro (2002-2007)
- José Manuel Entrecanales (2007-2009)
- Borja Prado (2009-2019)
- Juan Sánchez-Calero Guilarte (2019-Actualidad)

== See also ==
- Enel
