= List of longest prison sentences =

This is a list of longest prison sentences ever given to a single person, worldwide. Listed are instances where people have been sentenced to jail terms in excess of a human lifetime, but effectively the same purpose. Note that many national legislations worldwide do not allow for such sentences.

Since the sentence given is not necessarily equivalent to time served, the list of longest prison sentences served for those who have spent the longest continuous time in prison.

== Prisoners sentenced to life imprisonment ==
=== Prisoners sentenced to one life imprisonment with the possibility of parole after a period that exceeds a natural human living possibilities ===
| Name | Sentence start | Sentence term | Country | Description | Incarceration |
|---|---|---|---|---|---|
| Matthew Antonio Zakrzewski | 2023 | 707 years and 8 months to life | United States | Molested 16 boys aged 2 to 14 in California. | Sierra Conservation Center – Jamestown, California |
| Tyrone Lavono Williams | 2021 | 480 years to life | United States | Habitual sex offender in California who violated the terms by going near children and raping many of them. | California Substance Abuse Treatment Facility and State Prison – Corcoran, California |
| Colin Ferguson | 1995 | 315 years and 8 months to life | United States | Perpetrator of the 1993 Long Island Rail Road shooting in New York. | Mid-State Correctional Facility – Marcy, New York |
| Chauncey Price | 2017 | 304 years to life | United States | Human trafficker convicted of Violation of the Colorado Organized Crime Control Act, trafficking a minor for sexual servitude, human trafficking for sexual servitude, attempt to commit pimping of a child, attempt to commit patronizing a prostituted child, pandering of a child, possession of a forged instrument, possession of a forged device, two counts of pimping, and three counts of forgery. According to Colorado Department of Corrections, he received two sentences of 96 years, one sentence of 64 years, and one sentence of 48 years and a life sentence. | Arkansas Valley Correctional Facility – Ordway, Colorado |
| Brendan O'Rourke | 2012 | 189 years to life | United States | Sentenced for shooting at an elementary school in Carlsbad, California, injuring two second grade girls. | California Institution for Men – Chino, California |
| James Timothy McCarthy | 2012 | 182 years to life | United States | Convicted of numerous acts of child sexual abuse in California, including continuous sexual abuse of one child. Sentenced to 32 years in prison followed by 150 to life. | Correctional Training Facility – Soledad, California |
| Richard Allen Minsky | 2001 | 146 years to life | United States | Used car salesman charged with over 80 counts including rape, assault, battery, extortion, grand theft, larceny, lewd and lascivious behavior, oral copulation, sexual assault, sexual battery, sodomy, and prison escape. Also committed scams in California, Florida (where he was arrested after being featured in America's Most Wanted), Georgia, Massachusetts, and Pennsylvania. | California Men's Colony – San Luis Obispo, California |
| Donald Linville | 2017 | 121 years to life | United States | Convicted of filming himself having sex with multiple females, including a 15-year-old, who didn't know they were being recorded. | Arizona State Prison Complex – Florence, Arizona |
| Demorris Hunter | 2005 | 110 years to life | United States | A serial killer convicted of the 2002 murder of 41-year-old Ivora Denise Huntley in California. | Salinas Valley State Prison – Soledad, California |

== Prisoners not sentenced to life imprisonment ==
These sentences differ technically from sentences of life imprisonment in that the designated prison times have specific lengths, although in practice they serve the same purpose.

=== Prisoners sentenced to 10,000 years or more in prison ===
| Name | Sentence start | Sentence term | Country | Description |
|---|---|---|---|---|
| Chamoy Thipyaso | 1989 | 141,078 years | Thailand | World's longest sentence for corporate fraud according to Guinness World Records 2006. Also the longest, non-life, officially confirmed sentence ever handed in the world. She defrauded more than 16,000 Thais in a pyramid scheme worth $204 million at the time. However, the Thai law of the time specified that those convicted of fraud could not serve more than 20 years in prison and her mandatory release was 2009, she was paroled after only eight. |
| Mehmet Aydın | 2025 | 45,376 years, 6 months | Turkey | Mehmet Aydın and his brother Fatih Aydın were sentenced for their roles in an online Ponzi scheme, they asked to be sentenced to 25,699 to 85,646 years in prison for victimizing 4,582 people by “Fraud through information systems” through Ponzi scheme game "Farm bank" or in the original name "Çiftlik bank". |
| Fatih Aydın | 2025 | 45,376 years, 6 months | Turkey | Mehmet Aydın and his brother Fatih Aydın were sentenced for their roles in an online Ponzi scheme, they asked to be sentenced to 25,699 to 85,646 years in prison for victimizing 4,582 people by “Fraud through information systems” through Ponzi scheme game "Farm bank" or in the original name "Çiftlik bank". |
| Othman El Gnaoui | 2007 | 42,924 years | Spain | Sentenced for their roles in the 2004 Madrid train bombings. Under Spanish law, the maximum sentence that any of them can serve is 40 years. The release date is scheduled for March 19, 2044, for El Gnaoui. Both Zougam and Trashorras will be released 17 days before El Gnaoui. Zougam will be 71 years old, El Gnaoui will be 69 years old, and Trashorras would be 67 years old. It is the longest non-life, officially confirmed sentence ever handed in the European Union. |
| Jamal Zougam | 2007 | 42,922 years | Spain | Sentenced for their roles in the 2004 Madrid train bombings. Under Spanish law, the maximum sentence that any of them can serve is 40 years. The release date is scheduled for March 19, 2044, for El Gnaoui. Both Zougam and Trashorras will be released 17 days before El Gnaoui. Zougam will be 71 years old, El Gnaoui will be 69 years old, and Trashorras would be 67 years old. It is the longest non-life, officially confirmed sentence ever handed in the European Union. |
| Emilio Suárez Trashorras | 2007 | 34,715 years | Spain | Sentenced for their roles in the 2004 Madrid train bombings. Under Spanish law, the maximum sentence that any of them can serve is 40 years. The release date is scheduled for March 19, 2044, for El Gnaoui. Both Zougam and Trashorras will be released 17 days before El Gnaoui. Zougam will be 71 years old, El Gnaoui will be 69 years old, and Trashorras would be 67 years old. It is the longest non-life, officially confirmed sentence ever handed in the European Union. |
| Charles Scott Robinson | 1994 | 30,000 years | United States | Longest prison term to a single American on multiple counts. Also the longest sentence ever handed in the United States. Robinson was sentenced to 5,000 years for each of the six counts against him for raping a 3-year-old girl in Oklahoma. |
| Allan Wayne McLaurin | 1994 | 20,750 years | United States | Accomplice of Darron Bennalford Anderson. Upon appeal, his sentence was reduced by 500 years. |
| Pudit Kittithradilok | 2017 | 13,275 years | Thailand | Convicted of 2,653 counts of fraud. He admitted running a Ponzi scheme whereby he promised investors artificially high financial returns. About 40,000 people were persuaded to pour more than $160m (£120m) into his companies. Prosecutors told the court that Kittithradilok organised seminars where attendees were encouraged to invest in what he said were businesses linked to property development, beauty, used cars and exports, among other things. They recommended 5 years for each count and an additional 10 years. Totalling, 13,275 years. Due to his confession, his sentence was halved to 6,637 years and six months. Under Thailand law, a convicted fraudster cannot serve above 20 years. He will be released in 2037. |
| Darron Bennalford Anderson | 1994 | 11,750 years | United States | Greatest amount of prison time given as a result of an appeal. Found guilty of crimes ranging from rape of an elderly woman in Tulsa County, Oklahoma, to larceny, robbery and kidnapping, and sentenced to 2,250 years. He appealed, was reconvicted, re-sentenced and received an additional prison term of 9,500 years, later reduced by 500 years. |
| Faruk Fatih Özer | 2023 | 11,196 years | Turkey | Faruk Fatih Özer was a cryptocurrency trader convicted of fraud, and the owner of Thodex. Güven and Serap Özer are the brother and sister, respectively, of Faruk Fatih Özer, as well as his employees, and were convicted of crimes including fraud associated with the company's collapse. Faruk Fatih Özer was found dead in prison on 1 November 2025. |
| Güven Özer | 2023 | 11,196 years | Turkey | Faruk Fatih Özer was a cryptocurrency trader convicted of fraud, and the owner of Thodex. Güven and Serap Özer are the brother and sister, respectively, of Faruk Fatih Özer, as well as his employees, and were convicted of crimes including fraud associated with the company's collapse. Faruk Fatih Özer was found dead in prison on 1 November 2025. |
| Serap Özer | 2023 | 11,196 years | Turkey | Faruk Fatih Özer was a cryptocurrency trader convicted of fraud, and the owner of Thodex. Güven and Serap Özer are the brother and sister, respectively, of Faruk Fatih Özer, as well as his employees, and were convicted of crimes including fraud associated with the company's collapse. Faruk Fatih Özer was found dead in prison on 1 November 2025. |

=== Prisoners sentenced to between 1,000 and 9,999 years in prison ===
| Name | Sentence start | Sentence term | Country | Description |
|---|---|---|---|---|
| Adnan Oktar a.k.a. Harun Yahya | 2022 | 8,658 years | Turkey | Televangelist and cult leader. Nation's longest sentence for fraud and sexual abuse commitment according to TRT. Originally sentenced to 1,075 years in January 2021. On November 17, 2022, he was retried and sentenced to 8,658 years. |
| Rigoberto Vazquez Hernandez | 2013 | 7,000 years | United States | Perpetrator of a 2013 triple homicide outside of a nightclub in Dallas where he shot three people point blank. |
| Feanyichi Ezekwesi Uvukansi | 2012 | 7,000 years | United States | Perpetrator of 2012 shooting outside a southwest Houston nightclub that left three people dead and two others injured, including rapper Trae tha Truth. |
| Carlos Antonio Carias López | 2011 | 6,060 years | Guatemala | Former soldiers sentenced for their roles in the 1982 Dos Erres massacre. |
| Daniel Martínez Martínez | 2011 | 6,060 years | Guatemala | Former soldiers sentenced for their roles in the 1982 Dos Erres massacre. |
| Reyes Collin Gualip | 2011 | 6,060 years | Guatemala | Former soldiers sentenced for their roles in the 1982 Dos Erres massacre. |
| Manuel Pop | 2011 | 6,060 years | Guatemala | Former soldiers sentenced for their roles in the 1982 Dos Erres massacre. |
| Woodrow Holmes Ransonette | 1973 | 5,005 years | United States | Pair of brothers given 5,005 years each in Dallas, Texas for the kidnapping of Amanda Mayhew Dealey, the daughter-in-law of Joe Dealey, the then-President of the Dallas News. The brothers had kept Dealey in an abandoned duplex for 60 hours and released her after her family paid a ransom of $250,000. The brothers were arrested, and the money recovered, just four hours after her release. Woodrow Ransonette was released on parole in 1999, and Franklin Ransonette died in prison in 2008. |
| Franklin Joseph Ransonette | 1973 | 5,005 years | United States | Pair of brothers given 5,005 years each in Dallas, Texas for the kidnapping of Amanda Mayhew Dealey, the daughter-in-law of Joe Dealey, the then-President of the Dallas News. The brothers had kept Dealey in an abandoned duplex for 60 hours and released her after her family paid a ransom of $250,000. The brothers were arrested, and the money recovered, just four hours after her release. Woodrow Ransonette was released on parole in 1999, and Franklin Ransonette died in prison in 2008. |
| Henri Parot | 1990 | 4,797 years | Spain | ETA member found guilty of 26 murders and 166 attempted murders between 1978 and 1990. |
| Julio Gonzalez | 1991 | 4,350 years | United States | Perpetrator of the 1990 Happy Land fire in which 87 people died. The amount of years Gonzalez was sentenced to comes from the 174 counts he was found guilty of, each of which carried at least 25 years, and was denied parole in 2015. He died of a heart attack the following year. |
| James Kevin Pope | 2008 | 4,060 years | United States | Sexually assaulted three teenage girls over two years. Convicted of 40 counts of sexual assault and 3 counts of sexual performance of a child. Given 40 sentences of 100 years (40 life terms) for sexual assault and 3 sentences of 20 years for child molestation. This is equivalent to 40 life terms plus 60 years. Currently incarcerated at W.J. Estelle Unit. |
| Inés del Río Prada | 1989 | 3,828 years | Spain | Perpetrator of the Plaza República Dominicana bombing and other attacks by ETA. Released in 2013 after an attempt by the Spanish government to delay her release until 2017 was overruled by the European Court of Human Rights. |
| Ronnie Shelton | 1989 | 3,195 years | United States | Serial rapist known as Cleveland's "West Side Rapist", terrorized Ohioans for over 5 years in the 1980s, amassing 49 counts of rape and 230 criminal charges overall. Parole date was scheduled for 2094. Shelton committed suicide in prison on September 25, 2018. |
| Matthew Perry | 2023 | 3,000 years | United States | Convicted in Greene County, Pennsylvania for raping a young relative on a daily basis for at least 6 years. |
| Terry Eugene Culley | 1972 | 3,000 years | United States | Convicted in Dallas of the murder of insurance broker Jean Geron. |
| Larry D. Kiel | 1992 | 2,501 years | United States | Kiel sold "a small amount" of cocaine to an undercover policeman in Oklahoma. After his arrest, 86 grams of cocaine, 40 grams of marijuana, and $1,800 was seized from his car. Kiel received 1,000 years for drug trafficking, 1,000 for possession of marijuana with intent to distribute, 250 years for failure to have a tax stamp on the drugs, 250 years for maintaining a vehicle for illegal drugs, and 1 year for possession of drug paraphernalia, for a total of 2,501 years. Paroled on June 16, 2009. |
| Robert Floyd Angle | 1971 | 2,500 years | United States | Convicted of the murder of Jack Katz during the robbery of a car parts store in Dallas, Texas. |
| Francisco Mujika Garmendia | 2003 | 2,442 years | Spain | Perpetrator of the 1987 Zaragoza Barracks bombing. |
| Moses Sithole | 1997 | 2,410 years, minimum 930 years | South Africa | Serial killer responsible for most of the so-called "ABC Murders" in Gauteng province, South Africa. Found guilty of 40 counts of rape, 38 counts of murder, and six counts of robbery. |
| José María Arregi Erostarbe | 2003 | 2,354 years | Spain | Perpetrator of the 1987 Zaragoza Barracks bombing. |
| Antón Troitiño | 1989 | 2,232 years | Spain | Perpetrator of the Plaza República Dominicana bombing. Released in 2011. |
| José Luis González González | 2012 | 2,035 years | Mexico | Businessman convicted of repeated fraud starting in 2000. Longest sentence ever handed in Mexico. |
| Billie Glenn Woolsey | 1988 | 2,000 years | United States | Broke out of Alfalfa County jail in Oklahoma; Woolsey was being held on kidnap and rape charges, and Whitlock had been sentenced to 10 years for receiving stolen property. The men overpowered an officer and stole his police car, later abandoning the car but taking with them an AR-15 automatic rifle and an M-1 carbine, which they used to steal a pickup truck from an oil-field worker. When they were located two days later, they led police on a 32-mile high-speed chase through Bryan and Marshall Counties, exchanging gunfire with them. Two officers were shot, later making a full recovery, and one more was treated for injuries from broken glass. A Bryan County judge gave them 2,000 years each: 1,000 years for shooting with intent to kill, 500 years for possession of stolen property, and 500 years for running a roadblock. Tried separately in Marshall County, they additionally each received two life sentences and 20 years. |
| Jackie Dean Whitlock | 1988 | 2,000 years | United States | |
| Thomas Halliday | 2013 | 1,870 years, minimum 935 years | United States | Convicted of 234 counts of sexual abuse in Pennsylvania, creating and possessing child pornography for abusing a teenage girl for four years, filming and photographing the abuse. Parole date scheduled in 2948. |
| Luis Garavito | 1999 | 1,853 years and 9 days | Colombia | Colombian serial killer and rapist convicted of 138 murders. |
| Lawrence Jacob Stephens | 2001 | 1,823 years | United States | For his part in a 2001 Virginia home invasion, Stephens was sentenced to 1,823 years and his co-defendant, Darnell Nolan, was sentenced to 35 years. In December 2021, Stephens was granted a conditional pardon by Governor Ralph Northam and his sentence was commuted. He was released in January 2022 after 20 years in prison, though the details of the pardon are currently unclear. |
| Henri Parot | 1994 | 1,802 years | Spain | For his part in the 1987 Zaragoza Barracks bombing. |
| Christopher Bennett | 2003 | 1,800 years | United States | Convicted of killing his stepfather in Virginia. |
| Bentura Ruiz Flores | 1971 | 1,800 years | United States | Convicted of selling $20 worth of heroin to an undercover narcotics agent in Odessa, Texas. |
| Ronald Yarber | 2017 | 1,652 years | United States | Convicted of raping a disabled child over the course of 12 years. |
| Patricia Ayers | 2014 | 1,590 years | United States | Convicted in Federal Court alongside her co-defendant Matthew Ayers of 53 counts of producing child pornography. |
| Rene Lopez | 2016 | 1,503 years | United States | Convicted of repeatedly raping his daughter over a four-year period in central California. Based on a diary in which she recorded the attacks, corroborated by other evidence, he was convicted of 186 separate assaults. He had rejected 13- and 22-year plea bargain deals, as he maintained his innocence. |
| Antonio Rodriguez | 1970 | 1,500 years | United States | Convicted in June 1970 of selling three capsules of heroin to an undercover cop in Dallas, Texas. Paroled in 1981. |
| Marvín Abel Hernández Palacios | 2025 | 1,335 years | El Salvador | Member of a faction of MS-13 convicted of aggravated homicide, aggravated femicide, enforced disappearance, extortion, illicit trafficking, and illicit association. |
| Wilmer Segovia | 2023 | 1,310 years | El Salvador | Member of a faction of Mara Salvatrucha (MS-13). Convicted of 33 murders and 9 attempted murders. |
| Daryl Lamont Keener | 2012 | 1,266 years | United States | Convicted of 17 counts of aggravated robbery, 8 counts of robbery, and 1 count of weapons violation. He was given 17 64-year sentences and 8-24 year sentences totalling 1,256 years. Given another 10-year sentence. Sentenced to 6 years in 2003 for the bank robbery before. |
| Juan Antonio Olarra Guridi | 2007 | 1,243 years | Spain | Perpetrators of the 1995 Vallecas bombing. They were expected to serve a maximum sentence of 30 years. Both to be released in 2037 at ages 70 and 67, respectively. |
| Ainhoa Múgica Goñi | 2007 | 1,243 years | Spain | Perpetrators of the 1995 Vallecas bombing. They were expected to serve a maximum sentence of 30 years. Both to be released in 2037 at ages 70 and 67, respectively. |
| Cristian Alexander Vigil Campos | 2023 | 1,216 years | El Salvador | Gang member sentenced for committing 27 murders, planned and attempted homicides, and terrorism organization. |
| James Arthur Guye | 1971 | 1,205 years | United States | Sentenced for the rape and robbery of a Dallas woman and the murder of another inmate while in prison. Released after 14 years. |
| Richard Speck | 1972 | 1,200 years, minimum 400 years | United States | Mass murderer who systematically raped, and murdered eight student nurses from South Chicago Community Hospital on July 14, 1966. Sentenced originally to death in the electric chair in 1967, sentence commuted in 1972. Died of a heart attack on December 5, 1991. |
| César Alfredo Romero Chávez | 2022 | 1,090 years | El Salvador | A leader of Mara Salvatrucha (MS-13) convicted of 24 counts of aggravated homicide between 2017 and 2018, being sentenced to 20 years for each case. |
| Igor Portu | 2010 | 1,040 years | Spain | Perpetrators of the 2006 Madrid-Barajas Airport bombing. |
| Mattin Sarasola | 2010 | 1,040 years | Spain | Perpetrators of the 2006 Madrid-Barajas Airport bombing. |
| Mikel San Sebastián | 2010 | 1,040 years | Spain | Perpetrators of the 2006 Madrid-Barajas Airport bombing. |
| Miguel Krassnoff | 2025 | 1,022 years | Chile | Military officer during the dictatorship of Augusto Pinochet who was convicted of more than 80 counts of kidnapping, torture and disappearance of persons, which occurred between 1974 and 1976. |
| Efren Sanchez | 2025 | 1,016 years | United States | Attempted a mass shooting at a Colorado bar, firing a rifle at patrons and wounding two people. |
| Jhonathan Osmín Gómez Granados | 2023 | 1,008 years | El Salvador | Gang member sentenced for aggravated homicide, aggravated extortion, and terrorism organization. |
| Paul Edward Acton Bowen | 2019 | 1,008 years | United States | A former youth pastor who plead guilty to multiple child-sex crimes such as sexual abuse, sodomy, enticing a child for sex, and traveling to meet a child for sexual abuse which included 28 counts involving six boys between the ages of 13 and 16. |
| Lee Robertson | 1905 | 1,001 years | United States | A black man convicted in Texas of the attempted assault of Ella Robertson, a white woman. |
| Larry Joe Knox | 1970 | 1,001 years | United States | Sentenced in March 1970 for the assault and rape of a 24-year-old telephone company employee. Paroled in 1983. |
| Henry Brisbon | 1977 | 1,000 to 3,000 years | United States | Robbed and murdered three people along Interstate 57 in Illinois in 1973, when he was 17 years old. His sentence was the longest given in Illinois at the time and was explicitly imposed because he could not receive the death penalty according to Furman v. Georgia. In 1982 he was sentenced to death for the murder of a fellow inmate in 1978, just 11 months into his sentence. |
| Allen Brown | 1903 | 1,000 years | United States | A black man convicted in Texas of attempted assault. Brown was also given an additional 25 years by a different jury for burglary. |
| Joseph Franklin Sills | 1970 | 1,000 years | United States | Sentenced in February 1970 for the armed robbery of a dry cleaners in Dallas, which netted $73.10. Although at the time reported to be "probably the longest" sentence ever handed down in Texas, Lee Robertson's 1905 sentence of 1,001 years was longer. Sills' conviction was upheld on appeal. However, he was released in 1983 after serving 13 years. |
| Harold Eugene Hill | 1970 | 1,000 years | United States | Sentenced in June 1970 in Dallas for rape. The Assistant District Attorney had asked for a sentence of 5,000 years. Ronald Lewis Jones, an accomplice to the crime, was given a life sentence. Hill was paroled in 1983. |
| Jerry Lee Duffey | 1970 | 1,000 years | United States | Convicted of raping an 8-months-pregnant woman and stealing $3 from her purse. Given 500 years for rape and 500 for robbery with a dangerous weapon. In 1973, Duffey's sentence was reduced to two life terms. |
| Herbert Fields | 1970 | 1,000 years | United States | Sentenced to 1,000 years each in Oklahoma for first degree rape; sentences upheld in 1972. A key witness in the case, Jesse Stewart, died at the time of the sentencing after suffering a broken leg in a motorcycle accident. Stewart had previously told assistant prosecutors that if he testified, he was "a dead man." However, prosecutors believed his death to be a "weird coincidence." Phillips and Fields had their sentences commuted to 99 years in 1979 and 1980, respectively, by governor David Boren. Fields was released on March 22, 1989, and Phillips was released on January 10, 2013. |
| Jimmy Phillips | 1970 | 1,000 years | United States | |
| Eddie Ray Byrd | 1971 | 1,000 years | United States | Sentenced for beating a grocery store clerk with an iron bar before robbing the store. Byrd was already serving a different 101-year sentence for robbery, and shortly after a separate jury gave him an additional 10 years for assault with intent to rob. |
| Carl Junior Hackathorn | 1971 | 1,000 years | United States | Sentenced for the 1963 murder of Bobbie Jewell Nuttycomb Smith. Hackathorn was originally given the death penalty in 1963, but this was overturned several years later and he was given a new trial, where he was given a term of 1,000 years. The names of the jury members were kept secret after an anonymous telephone caller to the Associated Press threatened to kill the jury members if Hackathorn were not found guilty. Hackathorn was paroled in 1976. |
| Henry J. Bell | 1972 | 1,000 years | United States | A 19-year old convicted in Dallas, Texas of the rape of a 12-year-old girl. Prosecutors had asked for 3,000 years. |
| Solomon James Henry | 1972 | 1,000 years | United States | A 19-year-old convicted in Houston, Texas of the rape of an 18-year old university student. |
| William Curtis Griffin | 1973 | 1,000 years | United States | Convicted of stealing two credit cards and a penny, which occurred while he was paroled from seven life sentences. |
| Eugene Spencer Jr. | 1973 | 1,000 years | United States | For the murder of San Antonio policeman Antonio Canales. Spencer was initially assessed a term of 10,000 years, and the New York Times reported him as receiving such a sentence. However, under state law, the judge's assessment was not equivalent to a final sentencing, and the amount of time was lowered to 1,000 years shortly after. |
| Arthur Franklin | 1984 | 1,000 years | United States | Serial rapist convicted alongside Frankie Owens, who was sentenced to 500 years. |
| Charles DeWayne Butler | 1990 | 1,000 years | United States | Sentenced for the kidnapping, rape, assault, and robbery of a 30-year-old woman in Hugo, Texas. |
| Tommie Dean Henson | 1991 | 1,000 years | United States | For raping a 6-year-old girl. Convicted on two counts of rape, two counts of rape by instrumentation, and three counts of forcible sodomy. |
| Christopher Campano | 1994 | 1,000 years | United States | Found guilty of first-degree manslaughter of his wife, Caren Campano, in Oklahoma City, Oklahoma in 1992. |
| William Walter Schermerhorn | 1997 | 1,000 years | United States | Convicted of raping a 3-year-old girl. Given 500 years for lewd molestation and 500 years for producing child pornography. Discharged on August 15, 2022, according to the Oklahoma department of corrections website. |
| William Wesley Wood | 2005 | 1,000 years | United States | Convicted of raping an under 12-year-old juvenile girl 10 times. District Attorney Doug Valeska said it is the longest sentence he can remember being handed down during his tenure. Wood had sex with the victim at least 10 times over a three-year period, according to court testimony. The defense argued during the trial that the victim lied and had told the judge at a preliminary hearing that the rapes did not happen. The victim's mother also took the stand to testify against her daughter. They recommended 99 years for each of the number of times the girl was raped, resulting in a sentence of 990 years. But, according to Alabama Department of Corrections, Wood received an additional 10 years for first-degree sexual abuse. This totals 1,000 years. |

=== Prisoners sentenced to between 500 and 1000 years in prison ===
| Name | Sentence start | Sentence term | Country | Description |
|---|---|---|---|---|
| Raymond Rodriguez | 1972 | 999 years | United States | Convicted of the murder of Lonnie B. Warren. The prosecution had asked the jury for a sentence of 1,000 years, but they returned with one fewer. |
| Gregory Aaron Gadlin | 2013 | 967 years | United States | Convicted on 16 counts of robbery, plus being a felon in possession of a weapon and ammunition. |
| Walter Frank Meyerle | 2012 | 959 years, minimum 479 years, 6 months | United States | Convicted of molesting 15 children ranging from 4 to 17 years old. |
| Miguel Ángel Portillo | 2023 | 945 years | El Salvador | Member of a faction of Mara Salvatrucha (MS-13). Convicted of 22 murders and 4 murder threats. |
| Shawn Ryan Thomas | 2015 | 915 years | United States | Convicted on 59 counts of possession of child pornography. Later sentenced to an additional 30 years after pleading guilty to planning to sexually abuse and murder a 9-year-old girl on camera. |
| Roy Charles Waller | 2020 | 897 years | United States | Convicted of raping nine women. |
| Joseph Dyre Morse | 1966 | 888 years | United States | Janitor imprisoned for the rape and murder of a female student at University of Colorado Boulder. He proclaimed his innocence until he confessed to the crime in 1980. Died in prison in 2005. |
| Sholam Weiss | 2000 | 845 years | United States | Found guilty of participation in the bankruptcy of the National Heritage Life Insurance Corporation in New York. One time featured in the FBI most wanted list. He appealed for a lesser sentence but was denied. On January 19, 2021, his sentence was commuted by President Donald Trump. |
| David Allan Hall | 2015 | 825 years | United States | Convicted of 10 counts of promoting child pornography and 45 counts of possession of child pornography after creating an online blog that traded child pornography. A registered sex offender, he had previously been convicted in 1996 of attempted sexual assault on a 7-year-old child. |
| Samuel Hemphill | 1970 | 800 years | United States | A 19-year-old sentenced in Texas for the repeated rape of an 18-year-old girl over the course of several hours. He will be eligible for parole in October 2030. |
| Domingo Troitiño | 1989 | 794 years | Spain | Perpetrators and instigator (Santi Potros) of the 1987 Hipercor bombing. |
| Josefa Ernaga | 1989 | 794 years | Spain | Perpetrators and instigator (Santi Potros) of the 1987 Hipercor bombing. |
| Rafael Caride Simón | 2003 | 790 years | Spain | Perpetrators and instigator (Santi Potros) of the 1987 Hipercor bombing. |
| Santiago Arróspide Sarasola a.k.a. "Santi Potros" | 2003 | 790 years | Spain | Perpetrators and instigator (Santi Potros) of the 1987 Hipercor bombing. |
| Richard Smith II | 2020 | 775 years, minimum 205 years | United States | West Virginia man convicted of sexually assaulting his infant along with his girlfriend. Found guilty of 11 counts of first-degree sexual abuse, 4 counts of sexual assault and 5 counts of sexual abuse by a parent, guardian, custodian or person in position of trust, being sentenced to 25 years for first-degree sexual abuse, 25 years for sexual assault, and 100 years for sexual abuse by a parent, guardian, custodian or person in position of trust for a total of 775 years. |
| Juana Barraza | 2008 | 759 years | Mexico | Female serial killer dubbed La Mataviejitas ("The Old Lady Killer"). Sentenced to 759 years in prison for killing and robbing sixteen elderly women in Mexico City, although some believe that she might have over 40 fatal victims. She beat and strangled her victims using moves that she had learnt as a professional wrestler (ring name La Dama del Silencio, "The Lady of Silence"). The sentence specifies that she will be paroled in 2058, at age 100. |
| Darrell Wayne Delp | 2014 | 755 years | United States | Found guilty on 50 counts of producing child pornography and 10 counts of aggravated sexual battery. That would be 12 years for 50 counts of producing child pornography, and 15½ years for 10 counts of aggravated sexual battery. |
| Bruce Betcher | 2007 | 750 years | United States | Convicted in federal court of 24 counts of producing child pornography, 1 count of receiving child pornography, and 1 count of possession of child pornography. Died in prison in 2013. |
| Mark Anthony Beecham | 2012 | 744 years | United States | Given 99 years each for six counts (one of first-degree kidnapping, two counts of first-degree rape and three counts of first-degree sodomy), 20 years for felony first-degree theft of property, and 10 more for felony first-degree bail jumping. Previously sentenced to 120 years for other rapes. He will be considered for parole in 2027. |
| Lonnie James Pebley | 2012 | 736 years | United States | Sentenced for shooting at police officers with an AK-47 during a standoff. |
| Apichart Bowornbancharak | 2020 | 723 years | Thailand | Originally sentenced to 1,446 years for defrauding the public. They were arrested after numerous complaints. The Laemgate seafood restaurant had last year begun selling various food vouchers that required customers to pay in advance. One such deal offered a seafood meal at 880 baht (£22; $28) for 10 people – far cheaper than their usual prices. Initially, those who bought the vouchers were able to claim their meals at the restaurant but a long waiting list meant an advance booking of up to several months. But by March, the company announced its closure, claiming that it could not get hold of enough seafood to meet the demand. It offered to refund customers who had bought vouchers. About 375 out of 818 customers who complained got their money back. Bowornbancharak and Bowornbancha were arrested, later convicted, and sentenced to 1,446 years, although their sentences were cut in half due to the guilty plea. It was 723 counts of fraud. They would serve no more than 20 years. Their company, Laemgate Infinite, was also fined 1.8m baht, and the co-owners and the company was ordered to refund 2.5m baht in damages to the victims. They will be released in 2040. |
| Prapassorn Bowornbancha | 2020 | 723 years | Thailand | |
| Lisa Marie Lesher | 2019 | 723 years | United States | Lesher was a mother who raped her daughter and step-daughter, and was found guilty of two counts of first-degree rape, four counts of first-degree sodomy, one count of sexual torture, one count of second-degree sodomy, and one count of first-degree sexual abuse. Her husband Michael was sentenced to 438 years for his role in the abuse. According to Alabama Department of Corrections, Lesher received 99 years for four counts of first-degree sodomy, two counts of first-degree rape and one of sexual torture, 20 years for second-degree sodomy, and 10 years for first-degree sexual abuse. |
| Amadeo Hernández Parela | 2023 | 694 years | El Salvador | Member of MS-13 convicted of aggravated homicide, conspiracy to commit homicide, and membership of a terrorist organization. |
| José Ángel S. R. | 2022 | 686 years | Spain | Lawyer and soccer coach nicknamed "the Instagram pedophile", found guilty of sexually abusing minors, recording the abuse, distributing child pornography, and cyber-bullying 98 victims. |
| Edward Franklin Jackson Jr. | 1983 | 665 years with a minimum of 191 years | United States | Serial rapist convicted of 21 acts of rape among other charges, suspected of 15 more. |
| Stephen Anthony Saccoccia | 1993 | 660 years | United States | Convicted of laundering money for a Colombian drug cartel. |
| Steven Ray Hessler | 2022 | 650 years | United States | Convicted of a series of sexual assaults in Shelby County. |
| Franklin Romeo Martínez Hernandez | 2023 | 629 years | El Salvador | Member of MS-13. |
| Alán Nelson Lozada Garay | 2012 | 617 years, 6 months and 17 days | Mexico | Business associate and criminal accomplice of José Luis González González. |
| Raven Smith | 2019 | 615 years | United States | Convicted of sexually abusing five underage girls. |
| Julio César Santos Medrano | 2023 | 609 years | El Salvador | Member of MS-13. |
| Matthew Tyler Miller | 2019 | 600 years | United States | Convicted of sexually exploiting two young children. Charged with 20 counts of enticing two children under the age of 5 to engage in sexually explicit conduct for the purpose of producing a visual production of such conduct, and given 30 years for each count. A search revealed 102 pornographic images that Miller had produced of the children. |
| Stephen M. Howells II | 2015 | 580 years | United States | Convicted in Federal Court alongside his co-defendant Nicole F. Vaisey of six counts of sexual exploitation of children, including the kidnapping and sexual abuse of 2 Amish girls. |
| Francisco das Chagas Rodrigues de Brito | 2003 | 580 years | Brazil | Brazilian serial killer sentenced for homicide, abuse against dead bodies, and concealment of corpses. Suspected of being responsible for the murder of 42 children. |
| Richard Heeringa | 2012 | 576 years | United States | Convicted of 17 counts of sexually assaulting a child. Listed as one of the 15 most wanted list of fugitives of the US Marshals. |
| Jose Alfredo Rauda | 2019 | 553 years | United States | Convicted of 12 counts of attempted murder on a peace officer, 19 counts of assault with a firearm on a peace officer, four counts of assault with a firearm, one count of assault on a police animal, shooting at an occupied vehicle and possession of a firearm by a convicted felon. |
| Joseph Baldino | 2014 | 525 years | United States | Convicted of one count of soliciting for sex over the internet, four counts of transmitting child pornography and 100 counts of possession of child pornography. He was sentenced to five years in prison for each of the 105 counts to run consecutively. |
| José Ramón Claros Ramos | 2023 | 514 years | El Salvador | Member of MS-13 convicted of aggravated homicide and membership of a terrorist organization. |
| Muharrem Büyüktürk | 2016 | 508 years | Turkey | A private tutor found guilty of sexually abusing ten boys as young as 12, and of showing pornography to children between 12 and 14. A second trial added 84 years in prison for other offenses. |
| Sipho Thwala | 1999 | 506 years | South Africa | Serial killer known as "The Phoenix Strangler" or "Canefield Killer". |
| Juan Carlos Seresi | 1991 | 505 years | United States | Convicted of 20 counts of money laundering and 1 count of conspiracy. Juan Carlos Seresi and Vahe Andonian were released in 2020. Nazareth Andonian and Raul Silvio Vivas were released in 2021. |
| Nazareth Andonian | 1991 | 505 years | United States | Convicted of 20 counts of money laundering and 1 count of conspiracy. Juan Carlos Seresi and Vahe Andonian were released in 2020. Nazareth Andonian and Raul Silvio Vivas were released in 2021. |
| Vahe Andonian | 1991 | 505 years | United States | Convicted of 20 counts of money laundering and 1 count of conspiracy. Juan Carlos Seresi and Vahe Andonian were released in 2020. Nazareth Andonian and Raul Silvio Vivas were released in 2021. |
| Raul Silvio Vivas | 1991 | 505 years | United States | Convicted of 20 counts of money laundering and 1 count of conspiracy. Juan Carlos Seresi and Vahe Andonian were released in 2020. Nazareth Andonian and Raul Silvio Vivas were released in 2021. |
| Frankie Owens | 1984 | 500 years | United States | Serial rapist convicted alongside Arthur Franklin, who was sentenced to 1,000 years. |
| Shane Michael Emory | 2014 | 500 years | United States | Filmed himself molesting two young children. Pled guilty to 46 charges, including 24 counts of using a child in display of sexually explicit conduct and 10 counts of first degree sexual abuse. |

== False and unverified claims ==
| Name | Sentence start | Sentence term | Country | Description |
|---|---|---|---|---|
| Gabriel March Granados | 1972 | 384,912 years | Spain | March, a 22-year-old mailman in Palma de Mallorca, has occasionally been mentioned (sometimes erroneously as "Granados" or "Grandos") as the person sentenced to the longest prison term ever. He failed to deliver 42,784 letters, opening 35,718 of them and stealing their contents for value of 50,000 euro (2010 value). In consequence, March was charged with thousands of counts of fraud, wrongful appropriation of documents (one per undelivered letter) and theft, resulting in an unprecedented request of 384,912 years in prison and a 19-million-euro (2010 value) fine by the prosecutor. The actual sentence imposed was 14 years and 2 months in prison and a fine of 9,000 pesetas. |
| Two unnamed men | 1969 | 7,109 years | Iran | "Two confidence tricksters" said to have received one year in prison per criminal count, resulting in the "longest recorded prison sentences" according to the 1975 editions of The People's Almanac and Guinness Book of World Records. |
| Anders Behring Breivik | 2012 | 1,617 years | Norway | Breivik, a convicted domestic terrorist who committed the 2011 Norway attacks, was found guilty of mass murder of 77 people. This could extend 21 years on each person murdered, totalling 1,617 years. However, the sentence was 21 years instead with the minimum of 10 years. Although several European countries authorize life sentences, many do not. |
| Antonio Izquierdo | 1994 | 684 years | Spain | Perpetrators of the Puerto Hurraco massacre. Said to have been sentenced to 684 years, but this is the sum of the 342 years that each received individually. |
| Emilio Izquierdo | 1994 | 684 years | Spain | Perpetrators of the Puerto Hurraco massacre. Said to have been sentenced to 684 years, but this is the sum of the 342 years that each received individually. |

== See also ==
- List of longest prison sentences served
- List of prisoners with whole life orders
