= Article 7 of the European Convention on Human Rights =

Article 7 of the European Convention on Human Rights sets limits on criminalisation, forbidding ex post facto criminalisation by signatory countries.

== Text ==
No punishment without law

1. No one shall be held guilty of any criminal offence on account of any act or omission which did not constitute a criminal offence under national or international law at the time when it was committed. Nor shall a heavier penalty be imposed than the one that was applicable at the time the criminal offence was committed.
2. This Article shall not prejudice the trial and punishment of any person for any act or omission which, at the time when it was committed, was criminal according to the general principles of law recognised by civilised nations.

== Case law ==
- Handyside v United Kingdom (1976; no violation found, 13–1)
- Kokkinakis v. Greece (1993; no violation found, 8:1)
- Nikola Jorgić (2007; application ruled partly inadmissible and no violation found, unanimously)
- Mykolas Burokevičius (2008; no violation found, unanimously)
- Vassili Kononov (2010; no violation found, 14:3)
- Maktouf and Damjanović v. Bosnia and Herzegovina (2013; violation found, unanimously)
- Nikolay Tess (2014; application ruled inadmissible, unanimously)

== Other judgements involving Article 7 ==
- Ines Del Rio: case of the Parot doctrine

== Literature ==
- Harris, David; O'Boyle, Michael; Warbrick, Colin (2009). Law of the European Convention on Human Rights (2nd ed.). New York: Oxford University Press. pp. 331–339. ISBN 978-0-406-90594-9.
