= 1995 Vallecas bombing =

Car bomb attack by the Basque separatist organisation ETA

- Part of the Basque conflict
- Location: Madrid, Spain
- Date: 11 December 1995; 13:55 (UTC+1)
- Target: Army lorry
- Attack type: car bomb
- Deaths: 6
- Injuries: 19
- Perpetrator: ETA

A car bomb attack was carried out by the armed Basque separatist group ETA in the Puente de Vallecas district of Madrid, Spain on 11 December 1995, which killed 6 people and injured a further 19. The target was a camouflaged army vehicle which was transporting nine civilian employees of the army towards the nearby motorway.

== Background ==
ETA had previously placed car bombs in Madrid, the deadliest being the Plaza República Dominicana bombing in July 1986, which had killed 12 Civil Guards. The Vallecas attack was the third of 1995. Earlier in the year, ETA had unsuccessfully attempted to assassinate José María Aznar, head of the People's Party and Leader of the Opposition, who had escaped death due to protection offered by his armoured car. In the second attack in June, ETA had killed a police officer, Jesus Robello. The Vallecas attack came just four days after a meeting of European Union heads of state had taken place in Madrid, marking the end of the Spanish Presidency of the EU.

== The attack ==
ETA placed a car bomb, containing sixty kilos of amonal at one of the entrances to the motorway, through which army vehicles usually passed. The military vehicle was transporting civilian employees to their homes, army housing located on Peña Prieta Street. When the vehicle passed, ETA detonated the car bomb remotely and then fled in a car and by metro. The attack was condemned by all political parties in the Spanish parliament, with the exception of ETA's political wing, Batasuna, who declined to comment.

== Trials and convictions ==
On 27 September 2007, the trial of Juan Antonio Olarra Guridi and Ainhoa Múgica Goñi began. Both were charged with six counts of murder and various charges relating to planning and executing terrorist actions. Olarra, the ex-military head of ETA, and Múgica had been arrested in France in September 2002 and were believed to have been members of the Madrid Commando unit of ETA. The accused made no comment other than stating in Basque that they refused to accept the court's authority to judge them. However, on 30 October 2007, both were found guilty and sentenced to 1,243 years in prison for carrying out the attacks, though they were expected to serve a maximum sentence of 30 years.
