= Joaquín Villalón Díez =

Released Spanish serial killer

- Born: 11 December 1955 (age 70); Mérida, Spain
- Other name: "The Gentleman Murderer"
- Conviction: Murder x3
- Penalty: 17 years (first murder); 58 years (latter murders)

Details
- Victims: 3
- Span of crimes: 1981–1992
- Country: Andorra, Spain
- States: Escaldes-Engordany, Madrid
- Date apprehended: 28 October 1992

Joaquín Villalón Díez (born 11 December 1955), known as The Gentleman Murderer (Spanish: El asesino señorito), is a Spanish serial killer who was sentenced to 58 years imprisonment for killing two transgender women in Madrid in 1992, after having served a previous sentence for killing his wife in Andorra in 1981. After spending 21 years in prison, he was released in 2013 as per the Parot doctrine.

== Early life and first murder ==
Joaquín Villalón Díez was born on 11 December 1955, to a poor family in Mérida. Little is known about his early life, but as a young adult, he abandoned the compulsory military service and acquired a fake ID, with which he married a woman in his native Mérida and had two children. He did not remain faithful to his wife, as he secretly started dating 25-year-old Francisca 'Paquita' Gracía Coca.

The pair planned to marry in August 1981, for which they travelled to the town of Les Escaldes in nearby Andorra. On 22 July 1981, Paquita revealed to her love that she was pregnant, which caused an argument to erupt between the pair. In response, Villalón strangled her and then dismembered the body using an electric saw, before packing the remains into five plastic bags and dumping them into the Bixerrais River.

Gracía's remains were found not long after by some children playing in the mountains, and police quickly determined that Villalón was the perpetrator, as he was near the crime scene and his lover had mysteriously vanished. He was located at a hostel in Spain, and promptly arrested. For this crime, Villalón was sentenced to 17 years by a Spanish court, and repatriated to serve at one of the prisons there.

== Release and new murders ==
After serving nine years, Villalón was transferred to the open prison Yeserías Prison (now the Victoria Kent Social Reintegration Center) in Madrid, moving in with a new girlfriend in Arganzuela. Unbeknownst to her, Joaquín started frequenting the red-light districts in the city, often soliciting sex from transgender sex workers. On 27 September 1992, he went to the Paseo de la Habana apartment of 37-year-old nursing home attendant and Argentine native Carmen, who was transgender. After the two got into an argument, Villalón sprayed her with aerosol and then dragged her to the bathroom. There, he tied a chain to her chest and set fire to her legs, before stealing several items and leaving the premises. Firefighters were called in by neighbours who had noticed the fire, and while Castagnaro survived her initial injuries, she had to have her legs amputated, and later succumbed to them on 23 January 1993.

Two weeks later, Villalón entered the Lavapiés apartment of another transgender woman, a 29-year-old named Joanna. After the pair got into an argument, Villalón hit her, knocking Joanna unconsciousness, then dragged her to the bathroom, where he held her head underwater until she drowned. He then burgled through her apartment, stealing the TV, a video recorder and a savings book. Joanna's friends notified authorities about her disappearance, after she had failed to attend a prostitution party at La Castellana.

== Arrest, trial and sentence ==
While investigating the two deaths, police combed through the victims' bank accounts and security recordings in various banks, eventually succeeding in tracking Villalón down after he had attempted to withdraw 2 million pesetas from Martínez's bank account.

Villalón was brought to trial for the crimes of murder, robbery and fraud. He and his lawyer blamed his outbursts on Villalón's supposed other personality, the one which actually charmed and then killed the victims. Taking into account his diagnosis as an antisocial, narcissistic psychopath suffering from paranoid-schizoid fits, the Audiencia Provincial of Madrid found him guilty on all counts and sentenced to 58 years and 10 months imprisonment, in addition to having to pay 5 million pesetas to the victims' families and having to undergo psychiatric treatment. He was transported to the Segovia Unit, where he would remain for the next 21 years. On 12 October 2013, he was among the inmates who were ordered released following the landmark decision of the Parot doctrine, and has lived freely since then.

== See also ==
- List of serial killers by country

== Bibliography ==
- Carlos Berbell and Salvador Ortega Mallen (2003). Psicopatas criminales: los mas importantes asesinos en serie españoles [Criminal Psychopaths: The Most Important Serial Killers in Spain] (in Spanish). La esfera de los libros. ISBN 9788497340885.
- Francisco Pérez Abellán (5 October 2011). El hombre lobo y otras bestias [The Werewolf and Other Beasts] (in Spanish). Ediciones Nowtilus. ASIN B005SZ0ZPC.
