= Josu Urrutikoetxea =

Basque separatist

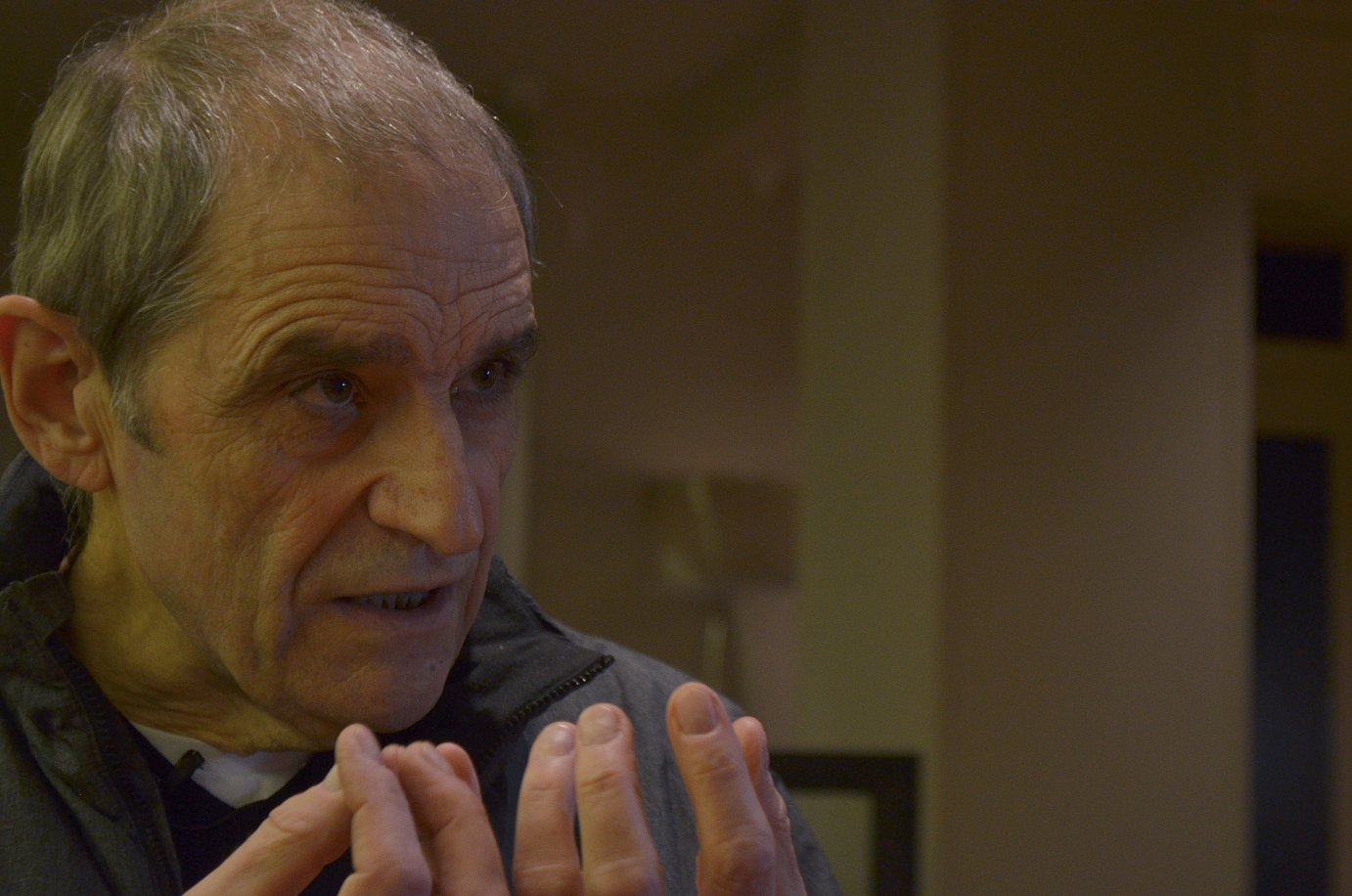
- Urrutikoetxea in 2020
- Born: Ugao-Miraballes, Biscay, Basque Country, Spain
- Military career
- Allegiance: Euskadi Ta Askatasuna (ETA)
- Rank: Leader of the political wing
- Nickname: Josu Ternera
- Conflicts: Basque conflict

José Antonio Urrutikoetxea Bengoetxea, also known as Josu Urrutikoetxea, Josu Urrutikoetxea Bengoetxea, and by the nickname Josu Ternera, is a former member of the Basque separatist organization ETA. In separate trials over a number of years, he was convicted for his involvement in the 1986 Plaza República Dominicana bombing and the 1987 Zaragoza barracks bombing, which together killed 23 people.

== Early life and education ==
José Antonio Urrutikoetxea Bengoetxea was born 24 December 1950 in Ugao-Miraballes, Biscay, Basque Country.

== Career ==
Urrutikoetxea joined the ETA in 1968, at the age of 18, and was in charge of operations in the Biscay region until fleeing to France in May 1971 at which time he joined the military front of the organisation.

In July 1972, he participated in ETA meetings in Madrid. On 15 July 1972, he attacked the Orbegozo factory in Hernani (Gipuzkoa), stealing approximately four million pesetas.

On 28 July 1972, Urrutikoetxea was involved in the robbery of a van carrying foreign currency for the Bank of Biscay in Pasaia (Guipúzcoa), seizing more twelve million pesetas. On 6 December 1972, he participated in an attack on the Union House of Hernani.

On 21 January 1973, along with other members of ETA, Urrutikoetxea planned attacks that would use their available supply of more than 3,000 kilograms of dynamite and various explosive materials. Part of those explosives were used in December 1973 to assassinate the Prime Minister of Spain, Luis Carrero Blanco.

=== First arrest, 1989 ===
In January 1989, Urrutikoetxea and Herri Batasuna leader Elena Beloki were arrested in Bayonne, France. The Herri Batasuna organization was later recognized as the force behind the international apparatus of ETA. Urrutikoetxea was sent to Fresnes Prison, near Paris, and later was extradited to Spain, where he was freed when it was ruled that he had been wrongly convicted in France regarding his membership and financing of ETA and the other crimes of which he had been accused.

Urrutikoetxea was summoned to testify on two occasions before the Supreme Court of Spain, which investigated whether Urrutikoetxea had issued the order for ETA to bomb the quarters of the Civil Guard of Zaragoza in 1987, killing eleven people, among them five children. On 26 October 1990, he was tried in France, found guilty and sentenced to ten years in prison in France for conspiracy, use of false documents and illegal possession of weapons.

The Office of the Public Prosecutor of the National Hearing Solicitor in July 1993 sentenced Urrutikoetxea to an additional twelve years of prison for being in charge of the international apparatus of ETA from 1984 until his arrest in 1989. After serving six years in France, he was handed over to the Spanish authorities on 4 May 1996.

Judge Javier Gomez de Liaño, of Spain's Audiencia Nacional, ordered Urrutikoetxea 's detention. That same month, he was accused of belonging to an arms depot. In June 1996, he was declared guilty of being in charge of the 1986 Plaza República Dominicana bombing in Madrid, which killed twelve civil guards.

Former ETA member Juan Manuel Suárez Gamboa recognized that Urrutikoetxea was one of the primary leaders of ETA. In October 1996, Jose Rego maintained that Urrutikoetxea was the head of ETA in 1987, which led to four more cases against him in the Audiencia Nacional.

=== Fugitive, 2002–2019 ===
From 2002 until 2019, he was a fugitive. Urrutikoetxea left ETA in 2006. In 2013, along with David Pla Marín and Iratxe Sorzabal, he met Spanish government representatives in Norway. Norway allowed them to remain there, conditional on progress being made towards a final dissolution of ETA. When this did not occur, the three were expelled from the country in 2013. In 2018 Urrutikoetxea was involved in the disarmament and dissolution of ETA.

He was detained in Sallanches, France on 16 May 2019.

=== Trial and acquittal, 2021 ===
He was tried in a French court in June 2021 for acts of terrorism committed by ETA in 2011–2013. On 1 September 2021 he was acquitted with the president of the 16th Anti-Terrorism Criminal Chamber of Paris stating "there is neither material evidence nor evidence of motive to prove the crime of participating in a criminal association with the intention of planning acts of terrorism."

Urrutikoetxea has been a member of the Basque Parliament in Vizcaya on the lists of Euskal Herritarrok and has been a member of the Commission of Human Rights.

== Society and culture ==
An interview between Urrutikoetxea and journalist Jordi Évole was the focus of a 2023 Netflix documentary, Face to Face with ETA: Conversations with a Terrorist or No me llame Ternera. Its inclusion in the 2023 San Sebastián International Film Festival was subject to controversy.
