= Terrorism in Spain =

Terrorism in Spain has been committed by various groups and people.

== History ==
There have been several phases of terrorism in Spain.

Spain was notably affected by a broader wave of anarchist terrorism that started in the late 19th century in Europe in connection to the notion of propaganda of the deed. Several of the perpetrators acting in Spain, such as Michele Angiolillo, Thioulouze, Tomás Ascheri or Girault, were actually foreign. Some of the terrorist attacks in this period include the 1893 Liceo bomb, the 1896 Corpus Christi bomb, or the magnicide of Cánovas del Castillo in 1897. The botched assassination in Madrid of King Alfonso XIII at the Calle Mayor during his wedding left 33 casualties and many wounded. Barcelona became infamous as fertile ground for bomb attacks in the early 20th century. Bomb attacks started to fade within anarchism at the turn of the first decade of the century, giving way to new forms of political violence at a time when anarcho-syndicalism became more disciplined and acquired more features of a mass movement along the decade, with the practice of pistolerismo appearing in the conflict between employers and trade unions. Magnicides in the early 20th century linked to anarcho-syndicalist terrorism such as individual assassination of two Prime Ministers (Canalejas in 1912 and Dato in 1921), as well as the Archbishop of Zaragoza, Juan Soldevila, in 1923, happened at a time of escalation of violence during the decadence of the Restoration regime.

From 1961 to 2011, the Basque separatist group ETA carried out more than 3,300 attacks with total deaths estimated to be 829 to 952. During a similar period, far right terrorist groups were active, opposed to the Spanish transition to democracy. They caused from 66 to 95 deaths.

In recent years, Al-Qaeda and then Islamic State of Iraq and the Levant have been responsible for significant attacks in the country. This includes the single deadliest peacetime incident, the 2004 Madrid train bombings that killed 192 people.

== Islamic terrorism ==
Jihadists were present in Spain from 1994, when an al-Qaeda cell was established. In 1996, the Armed Islamic Group of Algeria (GIA), an organisation affiliated with al-Qaeda, founded a cell in the province of Valencia. In the 1995–2003 period, slightly over 100 people were arrested for offences related to militant salafism, an average of 12 per year.

In 2004, Madrid commuters suffered the 2004 Madrid train bombings, which were perpetrated by remnants of the first al-Qaeda cell, members of the Moroccan Islamic Combatant Group (GICM) plus a gang of criminals turned into jihadists.

In the period 2004–2012, there were 470 arrests, an average of 52 per year and four times the pre-Madrid bombings average which indicated that the jihadist threat persisted after the Madrid attack. In the years after the Madrid attack, 90% of all jihadists convicted in Spain were foreigners, mainly from Morocco, Pakistan and Algeria, while 7 out of 10 resided in the metropolitan areas of Madrid or Barcelona. The vast majority were involved in cells linked to organisations such as al-Qaeda, the GICM, the Algerian Salafist group Group for Preaching and Combat which had replaced the GIA, and Tehrik-i-Taliban Pakistan.

In the period 2013, jihadism in Spain transformed to be less overwhelmingly associated with foreigners. Arrests 2013–2017 show that 4 out of 10 arrested were Spanish nationals and 3 out of 10 were born in Spain. Most others had Morocco as a country of nationality or birth with its main focus among Moroccan descendants residing in the North African cities of Ceuta and Melilla. The most prominent jihadist presence was the province of Barcelona. In 2013 and 2014 there were cells associated with Al-Nusra Front, the Islamic State of Iraq and the Levant.

In 2017, a terrorist cell based in the province of Barcelona carried out the vehicle-ramming 2017 Barcelona attacks, even if their original plans were on a larger scale.

The 2023 Algeciras church attacks were treated as Islamic terrorism by the Audiencia Nacional.

== Deadliest attacks ==
The following is a list of terrorist incidents in Spain that resulted in at least ten deaths. It lists attacks on civilians by non-state actors that are widely referred to as terrorism. It excludes the periods of the Red and White Terrors during and after the Civil War.

Key: Group

ETA Jihadist Anarchist Other

Date	Incident	Casualties	Perpetrator
November 7, 1893	Gran Teatre del Liceu bombing	20+ killed, 40+ injured	Santiago Salvador Franch
June 7, 1896	Barcelona Corpus Christi procession bombing	12 killed, 44 injured	Anarchists (suspected)
May 31, 1906	Botched assassination of Alfonso XIII	30 killed, 100 injured	Mateo Morral Rocca
September 13, 1974	Cafetería Rolando bombing	13 killed, 71 injured	ETA
April 12, 1985	El Descanso bombing	18 killed, 82 injured	Mustafa Setmariam (suspect)
July 14, 1986	Plaza República Dominicana bombing	12 killed, 32 injured	ETA
June 19, 1987	Hipercor bombing	21 killed, 45 injured	ETA
December 11, 1987	Zaragoza barracks bombing	11 killed, 88 injured	ETA
May 29, 1991	Vic bombing	10 killed, 44 injured	ETA
March 11, 2004	Madrid train bombings	192 killed, 2,050 injured	Al-Qaeda (suspected)
August 17–18, 2017	2017 Barcelona attacks	24 killed (inc. 8 perpetrators), 152 injured	Islamic State (suspected)

== See also ==
- Category:Paramilitary organisations based in Spain
- Islamic terrorism in Europe
- Al-Qaeda activities in Europe
- Terrorism in Europe
- List of terrorist incidents
- Terrorism in the United States
- Hindu terrorism
- Left-wing terrorism
- Right-wing terrorism
- Royal Order of Civil Recognition to Victims of Terrorism
