= Faruk Fatih Özer =

Turkish cryptocurrency trader and criminal (1993/1994–2025)

Faruk Fatih Özer (1993 or 1994 – 1 November 2025) was a Turkish criminal and cryptocurrency trader, known for founding and running the Thodex exchange platform. In September 2023, Özer was sentenced to 11,196 years in prison for crimes including fraud.

== Biography ==
Faruk Fatih Özer was born in 1993 or 1994 and had two siblings, his sister Serap and brother Güven.

He dropped out of high school before founding the Thodex cryptocurrency exchange in Istanbul in 2017. Thodex became one of Turkey's biggest crypto exchanges and Özer became a celebrity in Turkey, photographed associating with politicians including Mevlüt Çavuşoğlu and Süleyman Soylu.

Thodex collapsed in April 2021. Özer shut down his social media profiles and flew to Albania on 20 April 2021. Turkish authorities launched an investigation into the company on 22 April before accusing it of defrauding 390,000 investors out of approximately US$2 billion. Özer rejected the fraud allegation and said his company had temporarily closed its trading platform to investigate a cyber-attack.

An Interpol international arrest warrant was issued for Özer in April 2021, leading to his arrest in Albania on 30 August 2022. He was extradited to Turkey in April 2023.

At an Istanbul court, on 7 September 2023, Özer was fined 135 million Turkish liras (approximately US$5 million) and sentenced to 11,196 years in prison after being found guilty of various charges including fraud. His brother and sister were among the 20 others accused, and were both issued with the same sentences. Prosecutors stated that there were 2,027 victims.

On 1 November 2025, Özer was found dead in Tekirdağ F Type High Security Closed Penitentiary.

== See also ==
- List of longest prison sentences
