= Salinas Valley State Prison =

State prison in California, US

Salinas Valley State Prison (SVSP)
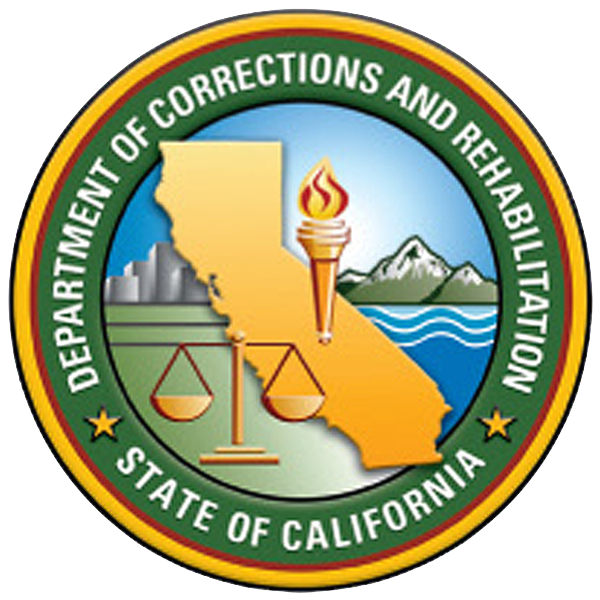
- Aerial View
- Interactive map of Salinas Valley State Prison (SVSP)
- Location: Monterey County, near Soledad, California; 36.4792°N 121.3739°W
- Status: Operational
- Security class: Maximum
- Capacity: 2,452
- Population: 2,934 (119.7% capacity) (January 31, 2023)
- Opened: May 1996
- Managed by: California Department of Corrections and Rehabilitation

Salinas Valley State Prison (SVSP) is a 300-acre (120 ha) California state prison located in Soledad, California, 5 miles (8 km) north of the center of Soledad, adjacent to the Correctional Training Facility (aka Soledad State Prison).

== Facilities ==
The prison consists of five facilities: A, B, C, D, and M. Of the five, Facility A, D, and M house Sensitive Needs Yard (SNY) inmates. The surrounding housing units hold level-4 and level-3 inmates, the two highest security rankings. M yard is a level-1 yard which houses approximately 200 inmates.

The prison had a gymnasium which, due to the prison's over-crowding, at one time had been converted into a dormitory but due to inmate population reductions was shut down around 2008.

The prison also houses an inpatient mental health program, formerly operated under the auspices of the California Department of State Hospitals (Salinas Valley Psychiatric Inpatient Program) to accommodate the psychological needs of inmates.

As of July 31, 2022, SVSP was incarcerating people at 102.5% of its design capacity, with 2,941 occupants.

== Notable prisoners ==
Location of Soledad in Monterey County, and Monterey County in California

- Anthony McKnight, Serial killer. Initially convicted of kidnapping, rape, assault, and attempted murder before being convicted of 5 murders.
- Terry Childs, serial killer
- Demorris Hunter, serial killer
- Andrew Hammond, serial killer
- Aariel Maynor, killer of Clarence Avant's wife
- Timothy McGhee, serial killer and gang member
- Robert Peernock, engineer who killed his wife
- Hans Reiser, Linux Kernel programmer
- Efren Saldivar, health practitioner and serial killer
- Antron Singleton, American rap artist
- Roy Charles Waller, serial rapist
