= Terry Childs (serial killer) =

Convicted American serial killer

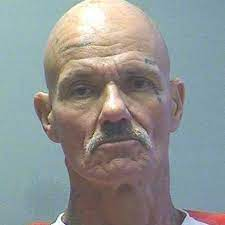
- Childs' mugshot
- Born: September 22, 1955; Santa Clara County, California, U.S.
- Died: February 11, 2023 (aged 67); Salinas Valley State Prison, Soledad, California, U.S.
- Convictions: California; Murder x4 Nevada; First degree murder
- Penalty: California; Life imprisonment without parole x4 Nevada; Life imprisonment

Details
- Victims: 5–12
- Span of crimes: 1979–1985
- Country: United States
- States: Nevada, California (possibly Washington)
- Date apprehended: August 22, 1985
- Imprisoned at: Salinas Valley State Prison, Soledad, California

Terry Childs (September 22, 1955 – February 11, 2023) was an American serial killer who was sentenced to life in prison for five murders committed in Nevada and California from 1979 to 1985. While his true victim count is unknown, Childs himself claimed at one point to have killed 12 victims, and that he had been pressured into confessing after seeing the ghosts of the people he had killed.

== Biography ==
Terry Childs was born on September 22, 1955, in Santa Clara County, California, into a family with six other children. He grew up in Aptos, where his father, Gary, worked as a bail bondsman. During his teenage years, Childs began to use a variety of drugs and alcoholic beverages, and by early 1970, had his first arrest for robbery. In subsequent years, he dropped out of school and would frequently spend time in jail for a variety of crimes, but was often given light sentences. He shared this trait with several of his brothers, who themselves were also petty criminals, and one would later be killed in prison after another inmate hit him with a barbell on the head during a fight. By 1985, Childs was known to the locals as a jobless drug addict who showed possible signs of mental illness.

== Murder of Lois Sigala ==
On August 22, 1985, the 29-year-old Childs and his girlfriend at the time were arrested for possession of a 10-inch artillery mortar simulator. As a preventative measure, their bail was secured at $250,000, and while they were awaiting trial, they became the prime suspects in the murder of 17-year-old Lois 'Jeanine' Sigala, whose body was found twelve days earlier in the small town of Scotts Valley. An autopsy determined that she had been killed approximately five days prior to her discovery, and that her killer had fired 15 rounds from a 9mm Luger into her body. During the investigation, police located a witness who claimed that he had seen Sigala enter a Ford Mustang similar to the one driven by Childs, while a friend of Childs, John, claimed that he had sold a Luger to Childs sometime prior to the killing. John then directed the authorities to an area where Childs had fired several rounds into some trees. At the site, several shell casings were located, which, following a ballistic examination, were conclusively linked to the Luger used by Childs. Despite this, the weapon was not located during a subsequent search of the suspect's apartment. Nevertheless, charges based on circumstantial evidence were brought against Childs on September 10.

During interrogations, the girlfriend, who was unwilling to testify due to threats made by Childs to murder her family, finally agreed to testify. According to her, the 17-year-old Sigala, whom she knew by her nickname "Jeanine", was a runaway, to whom she got introduced via Childs. She had lived with them for several months at their apartment in Capitola, and a few days prior to the murder, Childs informed her that he planned to kill Sigala because he suspected that she was an informant who was going to snitch on him for robbing the Pasatiempo Inn with friends John and Ron in July 1985. After convincing her to get into his car, he drove Sigala and his girlfriend to the outskirts of Scotts Valley, where he threatened to kill them both. Ultimately, Childs shot and killed Sigala and ordered his girlfriend to cover-up any evidence that could be traced back to him, including some cigarette butts left behind, before the pair fled in his car. In March 1986, the preliminary investigation was completed, after which the criminal case was sent to court.

In early April 1986, under the terms of the plea deal, some of the charges against Childs' girlfriend were dropped, and she was given a sentence of 5 years in the women's correction system. On January 15, 1987, Terry Childs' trial began. The Santa Cruz County Attorney's Office insisted that the defendant was a sadist who had committed the murder with extreme cruelty, taking pleasure in torturing his victim. At one of the court sessions, a forensic expert brought by the prosecution stated that nine out of the fifteen bullets had hit the victim, most of them in the areas of the arms, thighs and abdomen. According to his statement, the victim was conscious and tried to crawl away, before Childs fired one final fatal shot that hit her in the head.

The prosecution's main witness was Childs' girlfriend at the time of the murder, who reaffirmed her initial testimony and retold the events to the court. John, who was an accomplice in the robbery that led to Sigala's murder, refused to testify in court against Childs, but his father, J. Sr., claimed that he had seen his son sell the pistol to Childs. He provided the authorities with cartridges which, upon examination of their grooves, ballistic experts determined shared the same characteristic marks as the bullets extracted from Sigala's body, indicating that the girl had been killed by bullets from a box of cartridges.

Childs himself insisted on his innocence, claiming that he was mentally ill. To reinforce his claims, his lawyer brought in Dr. David Gorelick, a neurologist who worked at a veterans hospital in Los Angeles, who stated that the defendant's long-term drug abuse resulted in him developing paranoid schizophrenia. A number of Childs' acquaintances also stated that shortly before his arrest, he had acted in an aggressively paranoid or outright hostile manner. Childs' lawyer, Tony Salitich, also proposed that the girlfriend's testimony should be considered unreliable, as she herself was a drug abuser.

On February 4, 1987, Terry Childs was found guilty of the murder via jury verdict, after which the court sentenced him to life imprisonment with the right to parole after serving at least 41 years of his sentence. Reportedly, in a fit of anger, Childs had asked a friend of his to smuggle in an Uzi so he could shoot up the courtroom.

== Subsequent confessions ==
Following his conviction, Childs was transferred to the Corcoran State Prison to serve his sentence. In 1996, he attempted to kill another prisoner, after which it was decided that he should be transferred to the Pelican Bay State Prison, a supermax prison for violent felons, where he was held in an isolated prison cell. Upon learning this, in October of that year, Childs contacted the Santa Cruz Attorney's Office and offered them a proposal: in exchange for not charging him with capital murder and transferring him to an out-of-state prison, he would confess to 11 murders he had committed since 1979. According to his confessions, Childs had committed four murders in Santa Cruz County, two in Santa Clara County, two in Tracy, two in Seattle, Washington, and one in Sparks, Nevada. In the fall of 1996, he admitted that the murder committed in Sparks was that of 32-year-old Rulan McGill, who had been kidnapped, raped and stabbed to death while en route to a shopping trip in Reno on July 10, 1979. Childs provided details known only to the investigators and pointed to the corpse location with high accuracy after presented with a map, and with this information, the Washoe County Prosecutor's Office charged him with McGill's murder. He was extradited to the Sparks County Jail, where he would later be convicted and given another life term following a short trial, then returned to the Salinas Valley State Prison.

On October 12, 2007, Childs confessed to the murder of 19-year-old Linda Ann Jozovich, who had been killed on the evening of November 7, 1979, in Santa Clara County. Jozovich went missing from the parking lot of Mervyn's Department Store, where she worked as a cashier, and her fate remained unclear until 1995, when her lower jaw-bone and several ribs were discovered by a hiker in the Santa Cruz Mountains. The rest of her remains were discovered only in 2004. During the interrogation, Childs claimed that on that night he had been quarreling with his mother, after which he left the house in a fit of rage. He later met Jozovich at the parking lot, grabbing her and putting her into his car before driving to the Lexington Reservoir, where he beat, tortured, strangled and stabbed her to death. He claimed that for a long time, Jozovich's ghost had haunted him and caused him health issues, which prompted him to confess to the killing. Childs later claimed to be remorseful about the murder and expressed his desire to contact her relatives and ask for forgiveness. In 2008, he was convicted of Jozovich's murder and sentenced to another life term without the chance of parole.

In 2016, Childs contacted the Santa Clara County Attorney's Office again to admit to two more murders, both of which occurred in Aptos: the October 11, 1984 killing of 28-year-old Joan Leslie Mack and the February 3, 1985 killing of Christopher Hall. He claimed that after he had convinced Mack to enter his car, he took her to Seascape Beach, where he tied her up and beat her to death. As for Hall, a longtime associate of Childs who was found dead in San Lorenzo Park, he was killed because he had failed to pay drug debts. Childs would also admit responsibility for the murder of his father's 30-year-old fiancée, Penny Rickenbaker, who supposedly committed suicide by shooting herself in the head at the Childs household on June 11, 1974. At the time, Terry, his father and two brothers were in the house, and all of them claimed that they had been asleep when Rickenbaker killed herself. Despite his confession, this particular claim was not investigated further due to lack of evidence. In early 2017, Childs pled guilty to the murders of Joan Mack and Christopher Hall, after which he was given two more life terms without the possibility of parole.

Terry Childs died on February 11, 2023, while incarcerated at Salinas Valley State Prison.

== See also ==
- List of serial killers in the United States
