= Hipercor bombing =

1987 ETA attack in Barcelona, Spain

- Part of the Basque conflict
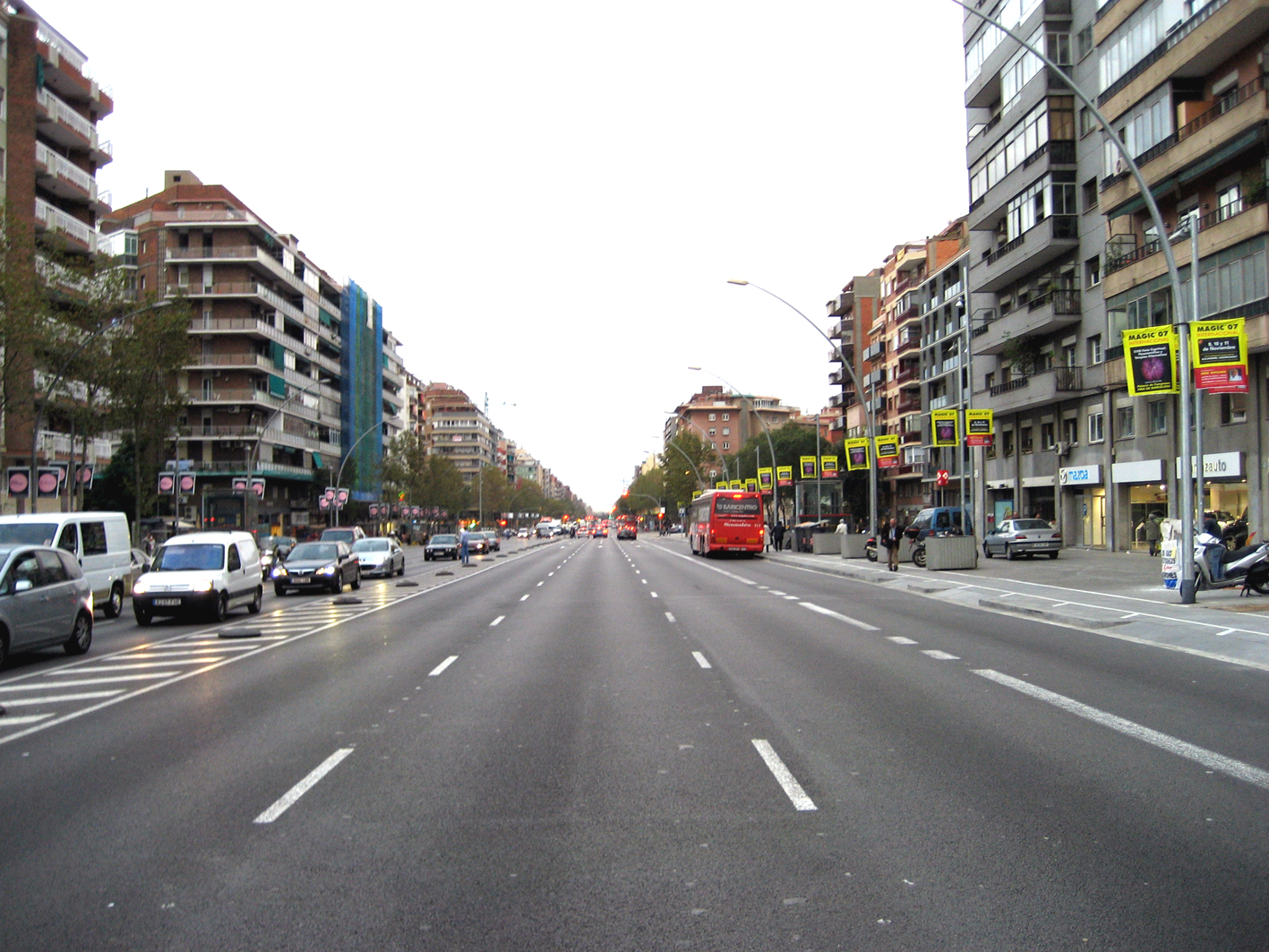
- Avinguda Meridiana, where the attack occurred

- Location: 41°25′41″N 2°11′08″E; Barcelona, Catalonia, Spain
- Date: 19 June 1987; 39 years ago 16:12 (UTC+2)
- Target: Hipercor shopping centre
- Attack type: Car bombing
- Deaths: 21
- Injuries: 45
- Perpetrator: ETA
- No. of participants: 4

A car bomb attack was carried out on 19 June 1987 at the Hipercor shopping centre in Barcelona, Spain, by the Basque separatist organisation ETA, which was classified as a terrorist group by the European Union and numerous nations. The bombing killed 21 people and injured 45, the deadliest attack in ETA's history. Controversy surrounded the timing of telephone warnings made before the attack and the authorities' response to them.

== Background ==
During the two years before the attack, ETA detonated six car bombs in Barcelona that killed three people.

Up to this point, Spain's deadliest terrorist attack had been the El Descanso bombing in Madrid in 1985 by suspected Islamic militants which had killed 18 Spaniards and injured 82 others, including 11 American servicemen, who were believed to have been the target of the attack. The ETA attack which had caused the most fatalities had occurred in 1986 when a car bomb on República Dominicana Square in Madrid had killed 12 civil guards and injured 50 people.

On 10 June 1987, 10 days before the bombing, ETA's political wing Herri Batasuna had received its highest vote share in the European Parliament elections, becoming the most voted for party in the three Basque provinces.

== Attack ==
=== Preparations ===
Acting on orders received from the ETA leader Santiago Arrospide Sarasola, "Santi Potros", three members of ETA's "Barcelona Commando" Josefa Ernaga, Domingo Troitiño and Rafael Caride Simón, decided to place an incendiary bomb inside a Hipercor store.

The three visited various commercial centres and selected one where a car could be parked. They then met in a flat in Carrer Castelldefels, Barcelona, Catalonia, Spain, and assembled a bomb containing 20 kilograms (44 lb) of ammonal and 100 litres of gasoline together with a timer device and an indeterminate quantity of glue and flakes of soap to create a bomb weighing up to 200 kilograms (440 lb). This was then placed in a stolen Ford Sierra.

=== Bombing ===
The attack occurred on a Friday afternoon. The car bomb, hidden in the boot of the vehicle, had been placed on the first floor of the three-storey subterranean car park below the commercial centre.

At approximately 16:12, a timer activated the bomb which exploded, destroying 20 vehicles parked nearby and causing a hole of around 5 metres in diameter in the ground floor of the shopping centre through which a huge ball of flame penetrated. Several of those unaffected by the flames were asphyxiated by the toxic gases produced, causing several fatalities. The damage at the scene was so extensive that several of the corpses could not be located until two hours later and some had been burned so severely that identification was impossible. Initially 15 people were killed, of whom ten were women (one of whom was pregnant), three men and two children. However, the death toll then rose to 21, as six victims succumbed to their injuries.

== Telephone warnings ==
In a subsequent communique, ETA said they had given advance warning of the bomb but the police had failed to evacuate the area. The police said that the warning had come only a few minutes before the bomb exploded.

The Spanish news agency said a man claiming to speak for ETA had told the Barcelona newspaper Avui 30 minutes before the blast at 16:15 that a bomb would go off in the store.

A spokesman at the store said police officers and private security guards began searching the store minutes before the blast. However the store management decided not to evacuate the store as it was not the first time that a bomb threat had been received. Ferran Cardenal, the Barcelona Civil Governor, said at a news conference that the police had searched the building before the bombing but found nothing.

Three telephone warnings had been received from a man who claimed to be an ETA spokesman with the first of the calls coming 57 minutes before the explosion. Some relatives said they would sue the police and the Hipercor store for failing to clear the crowded building after receiving the warnings. A store spokesman said it was up to the police to clear a building. But the government spokesman said the decision was up to management. "The building is private property. It's difficult to go against the will of the owners. The police's action was appropriate at all times."

== Reactions ==
Prime Minister Felipe González cut short a visit to Brazil to return to Spain. He told reporters in Salvador, Brazil: "This attack is of a different style than what we have seen to date. It is an attempt to force the government to change tack. But we will not give in to indiscriminate violence. We shall continue fighting terrorism with all the means we have."

There was almost universal condemnation of the attack. Some leaders of Batasuna also felt compelled to condemn the attack, although they pointed out that they did so in a personal capacity and not as party spokesmen.

An estimated 750,000 people marched through Barcelona with banners declaring, "Catalonia Rejects Terrorism". Around 700,000 workers paused for five minutes of silence to condemn the attack. While an ETA spokesman apologised for the attack, this apology was criticised, with the Barcelona newspaper La Vanguardia asking: "Does anyone who does not want to kill many people plant a bomb in a supermarket, at a peak hour on a Friday?"

Following the arrest in 1993 of the bomber Simón, The Independent noted that "The attack was seen by many as a turning-point in the organisation's fortunes, its cold-blooded murder of women and children sickening many Basques who until then had sympathised with the group's aims."

== Subsequent arrests and trial ==
On 9 September 1987, Domingo Troitiño and Josefa Ernaga were detained and on 23 October 1989 both were given sentences of 794 years in prison and fined more than 1,000 million pesetas. The Spanish Central Criminal Court ruled that they had acted in a premeditated manner and had spent a considerable time before the attack weighing up all the possible consequences.

Both were ordered to pay 320 million pesetas to the stores and to 114 people who had been injured in the attack. Additionally they were ordered to pay 525 million pesetas by way of civil responsibility to the families of those who had been killed and 200,650,000 pesetas to another 45 people who had been injured in the bombing. At the trial Troitiño and Ernaga attempted to justify their actions, stating that they had only intended to incinerate the stores, not cause deaths, although they were aware there were inhabited buildings at the back of Hipercor.

In 1993, Rafael Caride Simón was arrested in France. Spanish police alleged that Caride Simón had been the former head of ETA's so-called "Barcelona Commando" and had planned the Hipercor attack. On 23 July 2003 he was sentenced to 790 years in prison for carrying out the attack, while at the same trial, Santi Potros received the same sentence for ordering the attack.
