= Andrew Hammond (serial killer) =

American serial killer (born 1995)

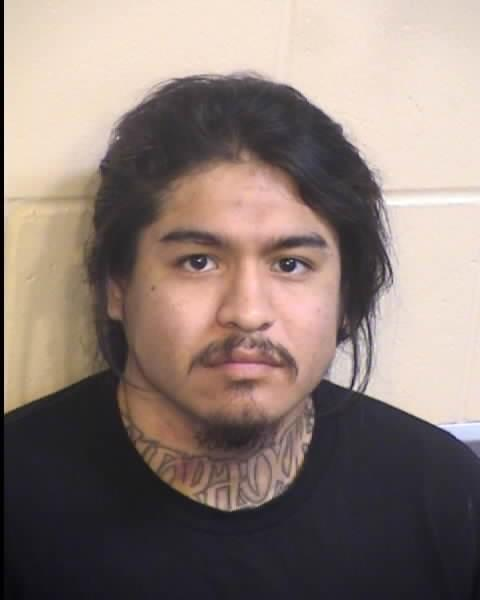
- Mug shot of Hammond
- Born: Andrew Levi Hammond; June 3, 1995 (age 31); Oakhurst, California, U.S.
- Years active: 2020–2022
- Status: Incarcerated at Salinas Valley State Prison
- Conviction: First degree murder with special circumstances (3 counts)
- Penalty: Life imprisonment without parole

Details
- Victims: 3
- Country: United States
- State: California
- Date apprehended: November 8, 2022

Andrew Levi Hammond (born June 3, 1995) is an American serial killer. He is serving life imprisonment, having been convicted of shooting three people to death in Fresno, California, between 2020 and 2022.

== Early life ==
Andrew Levi Hammond was born on June 3, 1995.

== Prior arrests and convictions ==
Prior to his murders, Hammond had been convicted of grand theft auto, felony evasion, and three counts of assault causing bodily harm.

== Murders ==
Hammond's first murder took place on September 28, 2020, when he killed Fernando Gonzalez, 41, in southeastern Fresno. Hammond's next victim was Steven Rice, 47, on October 21, 2022. Rice was shot by Hammond following an argument, jumped over a fence, and landed in a yard of his neighbor and collapsed. His third and final victim was 39-year-old Brandon Munoz, who was shot to death in a vacant house on November 2, 2022.

== Arrest and trial ==
Six days after murdering Munoz, Hammond was arrested and placed in the Fresno County Jail. He would also be charged with the murder of Gonzalez and Rice on January 6, 2023. Hammond's trial began on April 15, 2024, and was tried in Fresno County before Judge Johnathan B. Conklin. On May 1, he was found guilty on all counts. On June 27, Hammond was sentenced to three consecutive life sentences without parole for murder. He was also convicted of firearm enhancement, for which he received 25 years to life on each count.

== See also ==
- List of serial killers in the United States
- List of serial killers active in the 2020s
