= Parot doctrine =

Spanish legal doctrine

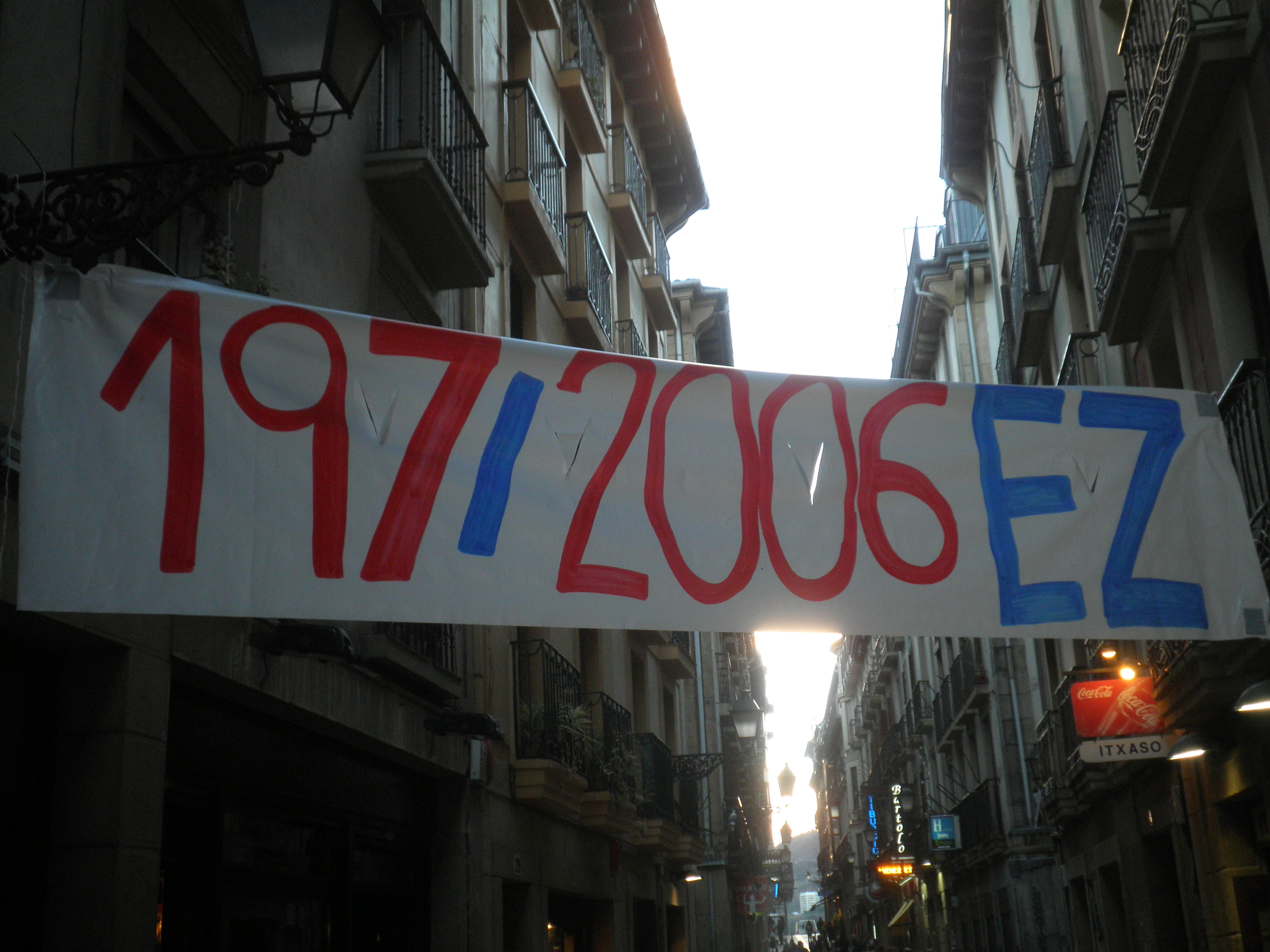
Banner against 197/2006 sentence against prisoners. Donostia.

The Parot doctrine (Spanish: doctrina Parot, Basque: Parot doktrina) refers to a 2006 Spanish Supreme Court decision to deny persons convicted of serious crimes specific rights that are granted by Spanish law that limit or reduce the maximum term of imprisonment. The European Court of Human Rights ruled its application to be a violation of Articles 5 and 7 of the European Convention on Human Rights and it was annulled in 2013.

== Law ==
Spain is a member of the European Convention of Human Rights and so may not change the application of a lawful penalty after the crime has been committed, a rule that the Supreme Court has breached according to the European Court of Human Rights.

Article 70 of the Spanish Criminal Code of 1973 prescribed a maximum length of physical imprisonment of up to 30 years (there is no sentencing limit), and Henri "Unai" Parot was sentenced to a total of 4,797 years.

This 30-year maximum could be further reduced by good behaviour and participation in rehabilitative measures such as work and study. The central argument of that piece of legislation was that denying prisoners at least some hope of release was cruel and unusual punishment and likely to cause the offender to become violent and unmanageable. In later years, the maximum prison term was extended to 40 years.

== Background ==
Henri Parot was sentenced in 1990 to serve several thousands of years for numerous murders and offences committed, mainly for the 1987 Zaragoza Barracks bombing as a member of the armed Basque nationalist and separatist ETA, which was a designated as a terrorist organization by Spain.

The Supreme Court reviewed his case and, in a judgement of 28 February 2006, ruled that for crimes committed before the current penal code came into effect in 1995, reductions would apply no longer to the accumulative maximum sentence of 30 years but instead to the absolute total term of the sentence.

He was the first person to be awarded what was effectively a life sentence beyond the statutory maximum period of imprisonment and so the term "Parot doctrine" emerged.

== Successful appeal ==
Inés del Río Prada, another ETA member, was sentenced in 1987 in a similar context as Parot to serve 3,828 years. Under the 1973 law, she was eligible for release in 2008. When asked to consider her release at the time she expected, the Audiencia Nacional applied the Parot doctrine and so ordered her to be detained in prison until 2017. The Constitutional Court found her appeal inadmissible.

She appealed to the European Court of Human Rights. The Strasbourg court ruled in 2012 that her continued detention under legal standards that were not in force at the time of her conviction was a violation of Articles 5 (liberty and security, particularly no detention except in accordance with law) and 7 (non-retroactivity) of the European Convention on Human Rights. Spain appealed, but the Court confirmed its decision in October 2013, and ordered her immediate release along with €30,000 compensation.

The ruling is binding, and Spain committed itself to abide by it. Dozens of other convictions were affected by the ruling.
