= Chamoy Thipyaso =

Thai fraudster with a prison sentence of 141078 years

- Born: 27 November 1940 (age 85); Sing Buri, Thailand
- Status: Convicted 1989; Released 1993
- Criminal charges: Fraud
- Penalty: 141,078 years

Chamoy Thipyaso (Thai: ชม้อย ทิพย์โส; RTGS: Chamoi Thipso; born 27 November 1940) is a Thai financial criminal and former employee of the Petroleum Authority of Thailand. She is known for receiving the world's longest prison sentence at 141,078 years for her involvement in a pyramid scheme that defrauded more than 16,000 Thais and is estimated to have been worth between $200 million and $301 million.

== Mae Chamoy Fund ==
In the late 1960s, Chamoy started a chit fund called the Mae Chamoy Fund, which was made to look like an oil share with high returns. Due to her connections with the Royal Thai Air Force and Petroleum Authority of Thailand, the fund was able to sustain itself for a remarkably long time. Her connections to the military were a huge factor in political and business power, and so its apparent military backing made the scheme seem legitimate.

The scheme drew in 16,231 clients, and was not shut down until the mid-1980s.

== Arrest and prison sentence ==
The fund had a large number of politically powerful investors from the military and even the Royal Household and as such there were calls for the government to bail out the banks and the chit funds. After discussions with the King, the nature of which were not made public, the Mae Chamoy Fund was shut down and Chamoy was arrested. She was held in secret by the air force for several days and her trial was not held until after the losses for the military and royal personnel involved had been recovered.

On 27 July 1989, Chamoy and seven accomplices were convicted of corporate fraud. She was sentenced to a total of 141,078 years or life imprisonment sentence in prison but Thai law at the time stated that the maximum sentence that could be served for fraud was 20 years. Her sentence was further reduced, twice, and she was released in 1993.
