= Robert Peernock =

American killer (1937-2021)

- Born: c. 1937; Tarzana, Los Angeles, California, U.S.
- Died: December 2021 (aged 83–84)
- Spouse: Claire Laurence Peernock (1966–1987; her death)
- Children: 2
- Conviction: Guilty

Details
- Victims: One
- Country: United States
- State: California
- Date apprehended: September 1987

Robert John Peernock (c. 1937 – December 2021) was an American convicted for the murder of his wife, Claire Laurence Peernock, and for the attempted murder of his daughter, Natasha Peernock, on July 22, 1987. Peernock was a former pyrotechnics engineer and employee of the California Department of Water Resources (DWR) who claimed he was framed because he was about to publish a book exposing state corruption. He died in prison in December 2021.

== Murder of Claire Peernock ==
Claire Peernock and her daughter Natasha Peernock Sims were discovered in the early morning of July 22, 1987, near Tuxford Street in the Sun Valley neighborhood of Los Angeles, California. Claire had been driving Peernock's car, a 1971 Cadillac, when the car struck a utility pole. The interior of the car, as well as Claire and Natasha, were found to have been soaked with gasoline. It was found that an explosive device had been placed on the gas tank rigged to explode, but that it had failed to detonate. Claire died from head wounds that were termed "inconsistent" with a traffic accident and Natasha was severely injured, but survived. A family member told authorities that Peernock and his wife had been in the process of separating and that she had sought protective custody from Peernock for herself and her two children. Peernock fled shortly after the death of his wife and a warrant for his arrest was issued in August 1987; he was apprehended the following month.

Peernock's girlfriend was charged with accessory after the fact to murder for assisting him with his finances between July 30 and his arrest on September 4, 1987. The charge against her was later dropped.

== Trial ==
The case went to trial in 1991 after Peernock underwent several psychiatric examinations to establish whether or not he was competent to stand trial. During the trial, Natasha testified that her father had restrained her with handcuffs and force-fed her "large quantities of liquor" 12 hours before the crash. Attorney Craig R. Richman argued that Peernock had murdered his wife for financial gain.

In the middle of the trial, Peernock attempted to fire his attorney Donald J. Green, stating that Green was "working to rig a conviction." During Peernock's testimony at his trial, he attempted to strangle Richman as Richman was cross-examining him, only to be stopped and removed from the courtroom by the bailiffs. On October 23, 1991, Peernock was convicted of the charges of murder, upon which he told the court he was innocent and demanded a second trial. Several times during the reading of the verdict Peernock was removed from the courtroom due to outbursts, with the judge eventually ordering his hands be handcuffed behind his back and his mouth gagged with duct tape while in the courtroom. In October 1991, Judge Howard J. Schwab sentenced Peernock to life in prison without parole for the murder of his wife. He was also sentenced for attempting to hire a fellow prison inmate to murder his daughter and her attorney, Victoria Doom.

During the trial, Peernock accused Judge Schwab of conspiring with several others to gain access to his finances. An unrelated search of Peernock's jail cell uncovered a list of names and addresses of jurors. The discovery prompted Los Angeles County Supervisor Michael D. Antonovich to request a ban on juror contact.

A later civil trial against Peernock resulted in a court order that he pay $11 million in damages to his daughter for the wrongful death of her mother.

== In popular culture ==
- The case was documented in a 2023 episode titled "California Crash" in the series Accident Suicide or Murder.
- It was the subject of a 2001 episode titled "Short Fuse" in the Discovery Channel series Prosecutors: In Pursuit of Justice.
- It was also profiled in a 2015 Investigation Discovery documentary called A Checklist for Murder, which is based on the book of the same name by author Anthony Flacco.
- In 2006, the case was highlighted on the “Family Secrets” episode of the Court TV series ‘’LA Forenics’’. However, the Peernock surname was changed for the episode, with Bob Peernock depicted under the pseudonym “Russell Parker”.
