= Demorris Hunter =

American convicted serial killer (born 1966)

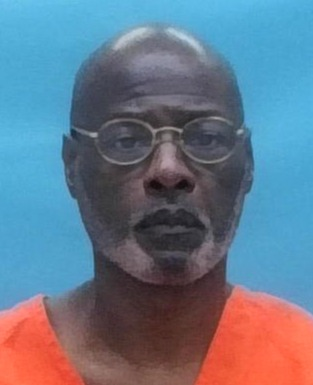
- 2026 FDOC Mugshot photo of Hunter
- Born: Demorris Andy Hunter; April 18, 1966 (age 60); Oakland, California, U.S.
- Status: Incarcerated
- Convictions: California; Voluntary manslaughter; Attempted murder (x2); Murder; Florida; First-degree murder
- Penalty: California; 24 years' imprisonment (1985); 110 years to life imprisonment (2005); Florida; Death (2026)

Details
- Victims: 3
- Date: 1985 – 2002
- Locations: California, Florida
- Imprisoned at: Pelican Bay State Prison (California); Union Correctional Institution (Florida)

Demorris Andy Hunter (born April 18, 1966) is an American serial killer convicted of three murders in California and Florida. Hunter killed 18-year-old Cesar Guzman in January 1985, and for this crime and two other shootings, he was sentenced to 24 years in prison. He was released through parole in 1997. In 2002, Hunter killed Ivora Huntley in California and killed Theresa Green in Florida while on the run for Huntley's murder.

Hunter was arrested in Houston, Texas, and was extradited to California, where he was put on trial for Huntley's murder and sentenced to 110 years to life imprisonment in 2005. Ten years later, Hunter was extradited to Florida to be charged with the murder of Green. After a long-delayed trial, Hunter was convicted of Green's murder in April 2026, and he was sentenced to death after the jury unanimously recommended that punishment.

== 1985 murder and crimes ==
Demorris Hunter, a native of Oakland, California, committed his first murder in January 1985. Hunter, who was 18 at the time, shot and killed 18-year-old Cesar Guzman in Oakland. The next month, Hunter shot Eric Wright and Adolphus Williams in separate incidents. Wright was left a paraplegic and died in 1986. Hunter fired a sawed-off shotgun at Williams, but he survived the shooting.

Hunter was caught and charged with the shootings and murder of Guzman. Hunter reached a plea agreement with the prosecution, and he was sentenced to 24 years in prison for these cases. Hunter served 13 years at Folsom State Prison before he was granted parole and released in November 1997.

== 2002 murders ==
=== Ivora Huntley ===
On March 26, 2002 — five years after being released from prison — Hunter committed his second murder. The incident occurred in Oakland, California. Earlier that same day, Hunter had been assaulting his girlfriend when 41-year-old Ivora Denise Huntley (also spelled Ivora Huntly) intervened in an attempt to stop him. However, Hunter turned to punching and kicking Huntley, before he stopped and went to a nearby apartment to retrieve a .380-caliber semi-automatic pistol. While Hunter was outside, Huntley called the police and reported the assault.

After retrieving the gun, Hunter approached Huntley, who was outside on the streets waiting for the police. After Hunter asked Huntley if she would have him arrested, she replied yes and this led to Hunter aiming the gun at her chin and fired one shot. Huntley fell down on the street and Hunter fired a second shot, which hit her neck, and Huntley died from the shooting. According to an autopsy report, Huntley's spinal cord was severed by the first bullet through her chin, while the other bullet had cut through an artery in her neck. Hunter was identified as a suspect after witnesses told police that they saw him running away from the scene.

Huntley's memorial service was scheduled for April 8, 2002, at the C. P. Bannon Mortuary. By the end of 2002, Huntley was one of 110 victims of murder in Oakland, California, during that same year.

=== Theresa Ann Green ===
After murdering Huntley, Hunter fled to Orlando, Florida, and re-settled in College Park. He located an apartment through mutual friends, and he met his 38-year-old neighbor Theresa Ann Green. At that time, Green was working as a hospital secretary and resided in the apartment with her 14-year-old son.

On May 25, 2002, two months after Hunter moved into College Park, he attended a party held at Green's residence, which lasted until about 2:30 am on May 26, 2002. After the party, Hunter and Green reportedly fell down the apartment stairs and while they were both uninjured, the two of them quarreled. After the argument, Hunter strangled Green to death and stuffed her body inside the trunk of her car. Later, he asked a male neighbor for the keys to a white van, and the neighbor drove the van to a Sanford pharmacy, with Hunter following the van while driving Green's car.

After reaching the parking lot of the pharmacy, Hunter took the keys to the white van and he drove the van to Texas, but before making the trip, he allegedly told the neighbour that he "did something really bad". After he reached Texas, Hunter left the van at an abandoned parking lot in Houston, and even burnt the van before he continued to evade the authorities. Green was reported missing on May 27, 2002, a day after she was killed. Her car was eventually found outside the pharmacy and her body was discovered inside the trunk of the car. The police, having linked Hunter to the murder, found the white van at the Houston parking lot where Hunter burned and disposed of it.

== Arrest ==
After the murders, police identified Hunter as the prime suspect behind the murders. Hunter's particulars, including his photo and name, were released publicly by the Oakland police with hopes to arrest him. An arrest warrant was issued by Florida authorities against Hunter in connection with Green's murder. A federal arrest warrant was also issued in June 2002, charging Hunter with unlawful flight to avoid prosecution in the killing of Huntley. Hunter was featured on the television show America's Most Wanted and listed as one of FBI's most wanted criminals.

While he was still on the run, Hunter stole the identity of Michael Berry, a prominent executive and community activist, and made use of the real Berry's identity to sign up for 15 new credit cards and accumulated thousands of dollars in bills. According to the The Washington Post, which first published Berry's story, the amount of money owed, as well as Hunter's status as a wanted suspect for the murders of Green and Huntley, caused Berry to be threatened with arrest until Hunter was identified.

On February 23, 2003, a year after the murders of Huntley and Green, Hunter was located by police in Houston, Texas, after a tip was provided to the FBI. A group of FBI agents, Houston police officers and Harris County sheriff's deputies arrested Hunter at a house in southeast Houston. When she received news of Hunter's arrest, Green's mother was relieved at the capture of her daughter's killer, but her reaction was mixed overall because she felt that her daughter would not have died if California authorities kept Hunter in prison for the 1985 killing.

After his arrest, Hunter was set to be extradited back to California to be charged with the murder of Huntley, and according to Orlando police detective Glen Gause, the Orange-Osceola State Attorney's Office and federal and California state authorities would discuss the possibility of sending Hunter back to Florida to face trial for Green's murder. Under the laws of both California and Florida, the death penalty was the maximum punishment for murder.

== Trial and imprisonment in California ==
2003 booking photo of Demorris Hunter in California.

On March 22, 2005, an Oakland jury found Hunter guilty of the murder of Ivora Huntley, and Alameda County Superior Court Judge Julie Conger was scheduled to sentence Hunter on May 5, 2005, for the crime. In seeking a sentence of 110 years to life imprisonment, Deputy District Attorney John Brouhard described the brutal and cold-blooded nature of Huntley's murder, saying, "The facts of this case and the defendant's shocking criminal history demonstrate that he is a miserable human being who richly deserves the sentence of 110 years to life."

In response to the conviction of her daughter's killer, Huntley's mother told the press that she was glad to hear the recommended sentence sought by the prosecution, knowing that Hunter would spend the rest of his life in prison for murdering her daughter, who was one of six children in their family. The 64-year-old woman stated that she missed her daughter, still looked at her photos even after three years since she died, and she vividly remembered Huntley's last phone call, which was made an hour before her death. Given that Hunter would be returned to Florida (where he faced a potential death sentence for Green's murder) after his murder trial in California, Huntley's mother stated that he should face the death penalty since he had done a lot of damage to her and other people.

On May 6, 2005, Hunter was sentenced to life in prison, and was ordered to serve 110 years behind bars before he could be considered for parole.

Hunter was incarcerated at the Salinas Valley State Prison, starting from May 16, 2005. Despite his sentence of 110 years to life, Hunter would be eligible for parole review in March 2028 under the Elderly Parole Program.

== Trial in Florida ==
On February 7, 2015, Hunter was extradited back from California to Florida to face charges for Green's murder.

On February 13, 2015, Ninth District State Attorney Jeff Ashton filed a notice of intent to seek the death penalty for Hunter in the case of Green's murder. Hunter, who was detained at the Orange County Jail, was scheduled to be arraigned in court on February 18, 2015, to face murder charges for killing Green.

However, Hunter's trial faced multiple delays throughout the following nine years since he was transferred to Florida for detention, and these delays were mainly due to legal slowdown of case hearings, the change of Hunter's defense lawyers and the COVID-19 pandemic in the United States. At one point, the case was removed from the Orange-Osceola prosecutors in 2017 due to State Attorney Aramis Ayala's opposition to the death penalty, and Governor Rick Scott ordered the Fifth Circuit State Attorney's Office to prosecute the case. Ultimately, Hunter was scheduled to stand trial in October 2025.

On March 30, 2026, 11 years after he was extradited to Florida, Hunter stood trial before the Orange County circuit court, and jury selection commenced on the same day. The prosecution was still seeking the death penalty for Hunter, whose previous motions to exclude it from his trial were unsuccessful. On April 6, 2026, opening arguments were made by the prosecution.

On April 8, 2026, after a three-day trial, Hunter was found guilty of first-degree murder by the jury. The sentencing trial of Hunter was scheduled to begin five days later on April 13, 2026.

On April 13, 2026, Hunter's sentencing trial began. The prosecution sought the death penalty based on the manner of Green's murder and called upon expert witnesses to testify regarding the criminal history of Hunter. Not only that, a statement from Green's son was also read out in court, "At only 13 years old, I was robbed of my mother’s presence, her support, and her irreplaceable love. The defendant didn’t just take a life—they took my mother, my children’s grandmother, and 20 years of peace I can never get back." However, the defense argued for life imprisonment and sought mercy for their client, and his family members described Hunter as a caring and playful person.

On April 14, 2026, the jury unanimously voted to impose the death penalty for Hunter. Chief Circuit Judge Lisa Munyon was scheduled to sentence Hunter on a date to be decided, and a hearing on June 1, 2026, was scheduled for the defense to make final arguments to seek mercy for their client.

On June 1, 2026, during the hearing itself, Hunter maintained he was innocent and never killed Green. Chief Judge Lisa Munyon scheduled a date of July 1, 2026, for the defense and prosecution to make final submissions before she formally decide on the sentence, and further set the sentencing date on August 4, 2026.

On August 4, 2026, Hunter was formally sentenced to death by Judge Munyon for the murder of Theresa Green. During sentencing, Judge Munyon remarked that Hunter had effectively forfeited his right to life and his existence in society by killing Green, and found the death penalty appropriate as recommended by the jury. State Attorney Bill Gladson supported the verdict of death, stating that there was no other punishment more fitting for Hunter, and added that Hunter "denied every measure of mercy to his victim" and killed her.

== Death row ==
Following his sentencing, Hunter was transferred to Union Correctional Institution in Florida on August 14, 2026, where he was incarcerated on death row. He was then transferred to Pelican Bay State Prison in Alameda County, California to continue serving his life sentence. His next eligibility date for parole is March 2028. If granted, Hunter will likely be returned to Union Correctional Institution until his execution date.

== See also ==
- Capital punishment in Florida
- List of death row inmates in the United States § Florida
- List of serial killers in the United States
