= Nikolay Tess =

Nikolay Vladimirovich Tess (Latvian: Nikolajs Tess, Russian: Николай Тэсс; 1921 – December 7, 2006) was one of the few functionaries in charge of political repressions in the former Soviet Union who were convicted for this activity.

== Biography ==
Tess joined the Latvian division of the NKVD in May 1945, having previously seen combat during both the Winter War and World War II. In 1949 he took part in the deportation program known as Operation Priboi, which saw tens of thousands of people deported from the Baltic states to inhospitable areas of Siberia. Tess, by now an agent of the Ministry of State Security, signed documents for the deportation of 138 people. At least eleven of the people deported died in exile.

Latvia gained independence from the Soviet Union in 1991. In 1998 Latvian authorities began investigating Tess' role in the deportations, and in March 2001 he was formally charged with genocide and crimes against humanity. Tess did not consider himself guilty, claiming that he was acting in the capacity for only 2 1/2 months and he was mainly in charge of verifying the match of the lists prepared by local administration against the Ministry lists. The Baltic Times reported that Tess claimed the deportees were treated well in Russia, and quoted him as saying "They were allowed to buy cows and goats – that's some genocide".

He was found guilty on December 16, 2003, and sentenced to 2 years of suspended imprisonment after a lengthy process delayed by ill health. The Russian government heavily criticised Latvia for the decision, and raised questions over the fairness of Tess' trial. Many human rights groups also raised concerns that Tess and other minor officials had been selectively prosecuted in order to appease growing anti-Russian sentiment in the country.

Tess appealed his conviction to the Latvian Supreme Court (unsuccessfully), and then the European Court of Human Rights, arguing that his rights under the ECHR had been violated because genocide had not yet been criminalised in 1949.

Tess died in a Riga hospital on December 7, 2006, at the age of 86. Following his death, his wife and brother continued his appeal in order to clear his name.

In 2014, the European Court of Human Rights declared the application of Nikolay Tess inadmissible. Concerning the merits, the complaint was rejected due to non-exhaustion of domestic remedies – Tess had not contested the law the conviction was based on before the Constitutional Court.

== See also ==
- Alfons Noviks, a Latvian Soviet collaborator likewise convicted of genocide for Operation Priboi
- Arnold Meri, a Soviet official charged by Estonia with genocide who died before the 2009 trial could be concluded
- Vasiliy Kononov, a former Soviet partisan accused of ordering the killing of civilians in a village in 1944
