= Thodex =

Defunct Turkey-based cryptocurrency exchange

Koineks Teknoloji A.Ş.
- Industry: Financial services
- Founder: Faruk Fatih Özer
- Fate: Ceased operations
- Headquarters: Turkey

Koineks Teknoloji A.Ş., known online as Thodex, was a Turkey-based cryptocurrency exchange founded by Faruk Fatih Özer.

Thodex was the first global exchange based in Turkey and of the 40 cryptocurrency exchanges in Turkey at the time. It had 391,000 users when it froze in April 2021 and an estimated $2 billion in money from investors when the owner fled Turkey and shut down the company.

== History ==
Thodex was founded as Koineks in 2017, at the time only the fourth cryptocurrency exchange to be founded in Turkey. They established Turkey's first Bitcoin ATMs.

Koineks went global in 2020, changing its name to Thodex in March 2020. That year, Thodex was also licensed by Financial Crimes Enforcement Network as a Money Service Business (MSB). The total transaction volume on Thodex was ~$3 billion as of November 2020. The exchange had various rewards campaigns to draw in new users and new capital.

== Thodex collapse ==
Thodex ran their final rewards campaign from March 15 until April 15, 2021. The company stated that they would give free dogecoins to new users, and 4 million tokens were distributed. The campaign led up to a day (April 20) that was named as "Dogeday" by Dogecoin fans, because the price was expected to go up on this day. The price of Dogecoin went up 20% on April 20, 2021. At the same time, users experienced some disruptions in their transactions. Following complaints, Thodex stated that the issues were due to the exchange being under a cyberattack and the next day, April 20, trading on Thodex was halted entirely. On April 21, users could no longer access their accounts and the Thodex website stated that the platform was "temporarily closed". In the meantime, Faruk Fatih Özer, the owner of Thodex, left Turkey for Tirana, Albania with $2 billion of cryptocurrency in his possession.

Complaints by users led to the start of an investigation on April 22, 2021, by public prosecutors. In May 2021, the first hearing for a victim of the frozen exchange was held by the Anatolian Civil Court. They sued Thodex for the taking and using of deposited money contrary to the user agreement.

After determining that users of Thodex could not access their funds and verifying that Özer had indeed left Turkey, financial crimes agents froze all the assets of Thodex. Arrest warrants were issued for Özer and 81 other suspects in September 2021. The Cyber Crimes Directorate arrested all suspects except for Özer himself, the arrested suspects included Özer's two brothers. An Interpol Red Notice was issued for Özer on 23 April 2021. The Istanbul Public Prosecutors Office opened a fraud investigation into the owner, and an investigation into Thodex in the scope of tax offenses and Consumer Protection Law. (Note: Law Number 6502 of Turkish National Law) The prosecutors also requested that the Cyber Crimes Directorate establish contact with foreign exchanges to determine if Özer had sent Bitcoins to their Binance address and if so whether those could be frozen/confiscated.

The Public Prosecutor's office in 2022 reportedly received certain receipts that showed that Özer had compensated some of the victims out of remorse.

Nevertheless, twenty-one of the suspects including Özer were indicted for three separate crimes and faced up to 40,564 years of collective prison sentences.

The court determined that the suspects had converted their clients' money to cryptocurrency and gold and that they had lured in their victims with deceptive advertising.

The arrest of Faruk Özer was made public by the Turkish Ministry of Interior on 30 August 2022. Albanian authorities had apprehended him in Vlorë at a resort after being wanted for a year.

On 7 September 2023, Özer was sentenced to 11,196 years in prison by a Turkish court (his brother and sister received identical sentences). In November 2025, he was found hanged and dead in his room at the Tekirdağ F-Type High Security Prison. After the Thodex collapse, Turkey started to look into ways to regulate cryptocurrency. In 2021, new regulations were put in place in Turkey, including banning the use of crypto assets as payment.
