= Henri Parot =

Imprisoned ETA activist

- Born: Henri Parot; May 6, 1958 (age 68); Algiers, Algeria
- Other name: Unai
- Status: In prison
- Allegiance: ETA
- Convictions: 82 counts of murder

Henri Parot (born 6 May 1958) is a member of the Basque separatist group ETA. He was born in Algiers in 1958, the son of a Basque-French marriage that migrated to Algeria. When the Algerian War ended and he was three years old, he returned to France and in the Basque-French city of Bayonne when he was 16 years old, where he learned the Basque language.

He was arrested on April 2, 1990, in Seville after an exchange of gunfire with the Spanish police. In 1990, he was given a 4,797 year sentence for 26 murders and 166 attempted murders between 1978 and 1990. He was also convicted of involvement in the 1987 Zaragoza Barracks bombing which killed eleven people, including five children.

== See also ==
- Parot doctrine

== Bibliography ==
- p. 62, Report of the Committee Against Torture, United Nations General Assembly, 50th session.
- "ETA killer ordered to serve 30 years". The Age. February 21, 2006.
- "Perfil de Henri Parot", El Mundo Partido Popular, August 1, 2006. (in Spanish)
- "World Briefings", Chicago Sun-Times, December 20, 1990.
