= Inés Del Río Prada =

Spaniard convicted of terrorist offences

Inés del Río Prada (born 2 September 1958) is a Spaniard convicted of terrorist offences. She was born in Tafalla, Navarra, in the north of Spain. She was a member of Euskadi Ta Askatasuna (ETA), which seeks to gain independence of the Basque country from Spain and from France through the use of politically motivated violence. In July 1987 she was sentenced to 3828 years of imprisonment after being convicted for committing 24 murders and assorted acts of terrorism.

== Parot doctrine ==
As calculated according to the rules of the Spanish Criminal Code of 1973, her release from prison should have occurred in 2008.

Her case was reviewed in accordance with the retroactive application of the Parot doctrine, which allowed her release to be postponed until 2017.

The prisoner first appealed the review of her conviction by the Supreme Court of Spain to the ultimate domestic authority, which is the Constitutional Court of Spain, who upheld the review decision to lengthen her term of imprisonment

Del Río and her lawyers successfully appealed to the European Court of Human Rights, which ruled definitively on 21 October 2013, ruling in favor of Inés del Río and ordering her immediate release (which occurred the following day) and ordered compensation of €30,000, which the Spanish authorities have resisted paying, claiming that she should compensate her victims. She has initiated appeal proceedings.
