= Ammonal =

Explosive made of ammonium nitrate and aluminium

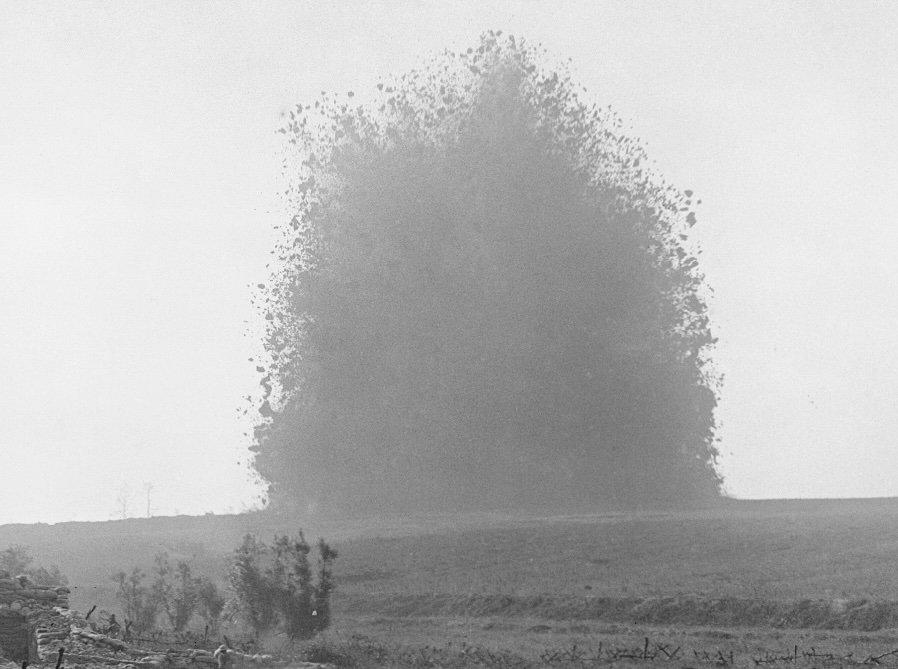
- The explosion of 18,400 kilograms (40,600 lb) of ammonal under Hawthorn Ridge Redoubt, 1 July 1916
- Type: Explosive
- Place of origin: United Kingdom

Service history
- Wars: World War I

Ammonal is an explosive made up of ammonium nitrate and aluminium powder. TNT is added to create T-ammonal which improves properties such as brisance. The mixture is often referred to as Tannerite, which is a brand of ammonal.

The ammonium nitrate functions as an oxidizer and the aluminium as fuel. The use of the relatively cheap ammonium nitrate and aluminium makes it a replacement for pure TNT.

The mixture is affected by humidity because ammonium nitrate is highly hygroscopic. Ammonal's ease of detonation depends on fuel and oxidizer ratios, 95:5 ammonium nitrate and aluminium being fairly sensitive, however not very oxygen balanced. Even copper metal traces are known to sensitize bulk amounts of ammonium nitrate and further increase danger of spontaneous detonation during a fire, most likely due to the formation of tetramines. More oxygen balanced mixtures are not easily detonated, requiring a fairly substantial shock, though it remains more sensitive than trinitrotoluene and C-4.

The detonation velocity of ammonal is approximately 4,400 metres per second or 14,000 feet per second.

== History ==
From early 1916, the British Army employed ammonal for their mines during World War I, starting with the Hawthorn Ridge mine during the Battle of the Somme, and reaching a zenith in the mines in the Battle of Messines which were exploded on 7 June 1917 at the start of the Third Battle of Ypres (also known as the Battle of Passchendaele). Several of the mines in the Battle of Messines contained 30,000 lbs (over 13.6 tonnes) of ammonal, and others contained 20,000 lbs (over 9 tonnes). The joint explosion of the ammonal mines beneath the German lines at Messines created 19 large craters, killing 10,000 German soldiers in one of the largest non-nuclear explosions in history. Not all of the mines laid by the British Army at Messines were detonated, however. Two mines were not ignited in 1917 because they had been abandoned before the battle, and four were outside the area of the offensive. On 17 July 1955, a lightning strike set off one of these four latter mines. There were no human casualties, but one cow was killed. Another of the unused mines is believed to have been found in a location beneath a farmhouse, but no attempt has been made to remove it.

Ammonal used for military mining purposes was generally contained within metal cans or rubberised bags to prevent moisture ingress problems. The composition of ammonal used at Messines was 65% ammonium nitrate, 17% aluminium, 15% trinitrotoluene (TNT), and 3% charcoal. Ammonal remains in use as an industrial explosive. Typically, it is used for quarrying or mining purposes.

ETA, a Basque separatist organisation, used 250 kg of ammonal in a car bomb in its attack on the Zaragoza barracks on 11 December 1987 in Zaragoza, Spain.

== Proportions ==
A T-ammonal mixture previously used in hand grenades and shells has the proportions (by mass):

- ammonium nitrate 58.6%
- aluminium powder 21%
- charcoal 2.4%
- TNT 18%

== See also ==
- Amatol
- ANFO
- BLU-82 "Daisy Cutter"
- Tritonal
