= 1987 Zaragoza bombing =

Car bomb attack by the Basque separatist organisation ETA

Coordinates: 41°39′41″N 0°51′56″W

Zaragoza barracks bombing
- Part of the Basque conflict
- 1987 Zaragoza bombing (Aragon) 1987 Zaragoza bombing (Spain) 1987 Zaragoza bombing (Europe)
- Location: Zaragoza, Aragon, Spain
- Date: 11 December 1987; 06:10 (UTC+1)
- Target: Guardia Civil agents and their families
- Attack type: Car bombing
- Deaths: 11
- Injuries: 88
- Perpetrator: ETA
- No. of participants: 4

A car bomb attack was carried out by the Basque separatist organisation ETA on 11 December 1987. A vehicle containing 250 kilograms (550 lb) of ammonal was parked beside the main Guardia Civil barracks in the city of Zaragoza, Aragon, Spain; its explosion killed 11 people, including 5 children. Another 88 people were injured, the majority of them civilians.

The attack came almost six months after ETA had killed 21 people and injured 45 more in a car bomb attack on a Hipercor shopping centre in Barcelona. Most of those killed were women and children who were burnt by the high temperatures the explosion provoked.

Responsibility for the attack was placed on the Argala Commando Unit, an itinerant unit composed of French citizens who immediately returned to France after committing the attacks. Those involved in the attacks and those responsible for their planning were detained in a number of police operations during 1989 and 1992.

== Attack ==
=== Context ===
The attack occurred nearly six months after the Hipercor bombing in Barcelona had killed 21 people and injured 45. Following the Barcelona bombing, ETA's call for talks with the government of Felipe González was rejected and, on 5 November 1987, the Pact of Madrid resulted in an agreement between the main Spanish political parties to release a joint statement rejecting the legitimacy of ETA to speak on behalf of the Basque people and ruling out negotiations until the group had formally disarmed. The Zaragoza attack was accordingly interpreted as ETA's response to the Pact of Madrid and occurred while ETA was under the leadership of the Artapalo group. This leadership continued until 1992 and the era was marked by some of ETA's deadliest attacks.

=== Target ===
The Guardia Civil barracks, situated on Avenida de Cataluña, was a four-storey building without special protection. It housed 40 families of Guardia Civil members for a total of 180 people.

=== The attack ===
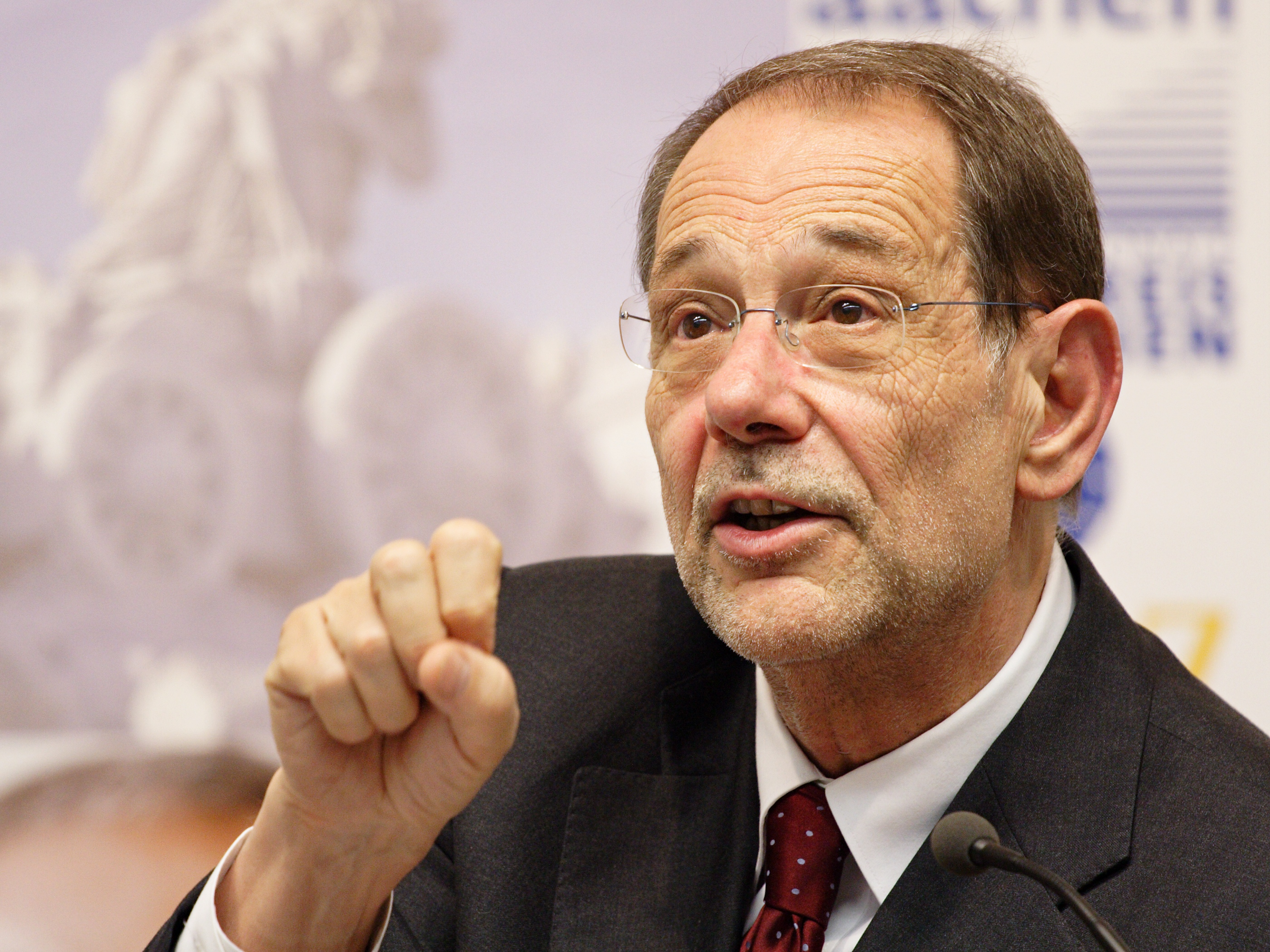
Javier Solana was the first government minister to condemn the attack

At 06:10 on 11 December, a Guardia Civil officer stationed at the entrance to the barracks noticed 2 men parking a Renault 18 in front of the building. When he approached them to inform them that they were not allowed to park vehicles in front of the building, they fled. Suspecting an imminent attack, the officer rushed back to the barracks to raise the alarm. The ETA militants escaped from the scene in another vehicle which they had parked nearby. Before the officer had had time to wake those sleeping, the 250 kilograms (550 lb) of ammonal exploded, making a huge hole in the wall and instantly demolishing all four floors. The blast also hit neighboring houses. Members of the Red Cross, security forces, and medical personnel quickly arrived at the scene. The building's collapse forced them to clear debris in search of those trapped beneath. The large number of emergency vehicles at the scene led to the accidental death of a motorcyclist, who was hit by a military vehicle.

Firefighters eventually removed the debris and began removing the bodies of those killed in the attack, which included 3-year-old twins and girls of 6 and 7 years old. In addition, there were 88 injured, some of whom needed to have limbs amputated. The rescue effort continued through the night and, at 13:45 the following day, the last bodies, those of Ángel Alcaraz and María Dolores Franco, wife of a policeman, were pulled from the rubble.

Government spokesman Javier Solana was the first minister to speak to the press following the attack:

I want to express feelings of regret, sorrow, and solidarity to the families of the victims, the wounded and in general all the Guardia Civil...it is extremely serious and especially disgusting that the attack has caused casualties among children, which again highlights the moral character of its authors and their supporters. On behalf of the Government I can say that there are no contacts with murderers...the importance of the anti-terrorist agreement of all political formations has not changed. And today the anti-terrorist Pact is more important than ever before."

== Funerals ==
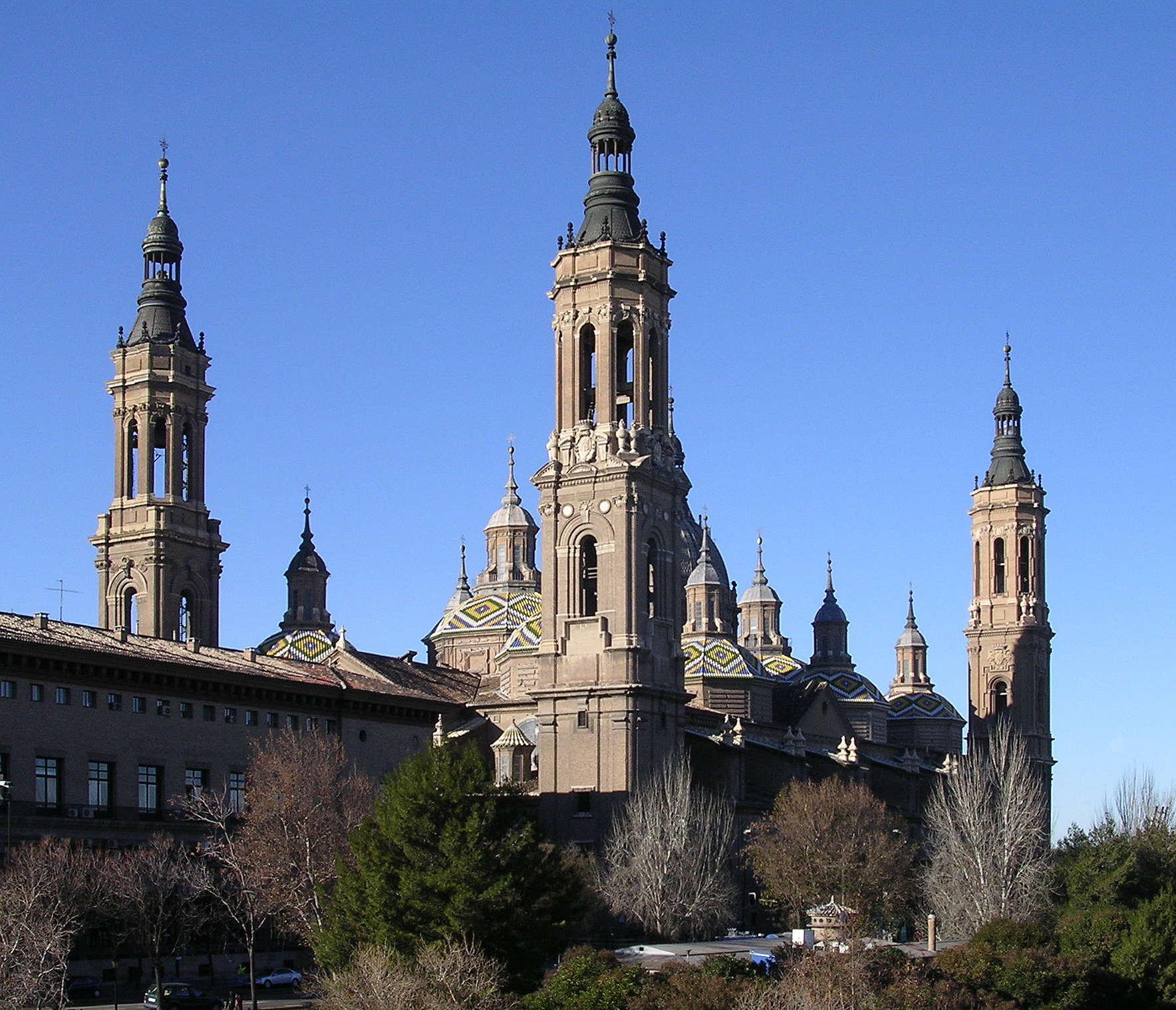
Exterior of the Basilica of Our Lady of the Pillar, where the funerals took place

The funerals of the 11 victims took place on 12 December 1987 in the Basilica of Our Lady of the Pillar in Zaragoza. The funerals were attended by the President of Aragon, Hipólito Gómez de las Roces, and the Defense Minister, Narcís Serra and the Interior Minister José Barrionuevo. Subsequently, the dead were returned to their places of origin.

During the funeral, there were scenes of tension in the congregation, with some fainting. Although no journalists entered the Basilica, photos of the coffins of the three-year-old twins appeared on the front pages of most national newspapers the following day, leading to strong anti-ETA sentiment.

On 13 December, the largest demonstration in the history of Zaragoza took place, with 250,000 people protesting in the streets, proceeded by a large banner with the words "Zaragoza for peace and against terrorism" (Spanish: "Zaragoza por la paz y contra el terrorismo.")

== Responsibility ==
Responsibility was placed on the Comando Argala, who were also blamed for another 21 attacks which had killed a total of 38 people. The Commando Unit was believed to be an itinerant unit composed of French citizens who committed attacks in Spain before fleeing across the border to France where the Spanish enforcement agencies were unable to operate. The Unit had been formed in 1978 and was disbanded by police in 1990.

=== Organisation of the attack ===
ETA, at that time, was led by a collective called Artapalo composed of Francisco Mujika Garmendia (Pakito), José María Arregi Erostarbe (Fitipaldi) and José Antonio Urruticoechea Bengoechea (Josu Ternera).

At the subsequent trial, it was revealed that the direct order to execute the Zaragoza attack had come from the Artapalo collective leadership and had been communicated by Josu Ternera. The explosives expert named Joseba Arregi Ersotarbe, alias Fitipaldi, was responsible for assembling the device and delivering it to the bombers. Francisco Mujika Garmendia, alias Pakito, monitored and produced a sketch of the barracks, giving the direct order to attack it. Four French nationals were responsible for executing the attack: Henri Parot, his brother Jean Parot, Jacques Esnal, and Frédéric Haramboure.

The four traveled from the French Basque country to Zaragoza, where two vehicles were moved to the vicinity of the barracks. The first, a Renault 18 had been stolen in Toulouse. A bomb consisting of about 250 kg of amonal divided into three steel cylinders was placed in this vehicle. Henri Parot parked the vehicle beside the entrance to the barracks while Esnal activated the mechanism that triggered the explosion in one minute and fifteen seconds, just long enough to enter and escape in the Peugeot 205 in which his two accomplices were waiting nearby.

=== Arrests ===
José Antonio Urruticoetxea Bengoetxea, alias Josu Ternera, was arrested in Bayonne, France, in January 1989 and Henri Parot was arrested in Seville, Spain, on 2 April 1990 in a car packed with explosives for a planned attack on Seville's police headquarters. The arrests revealed the location of Jean Parot, Haramboure, and Esnal, who were immediately arrested by French police in Bayonne.

Cooperation between the French and Spanish police resulted in the capture, on 29 March 1992, of the Artapalo leadership of ETA in Bidart in the French Basque country. Those arrested included Francisco Múgica Garmendia, Pakito; José Luis Álvarez Santacristina, Txelis; and José María Arregi Erostarbe, Fitipaldi.

=== Trials and sentences ===
After the arrest of those who masterminded and executed the attack on Zaragoza, the following sentences were imposed:

- Josu Urrutikoetxea, Josu Ternera: Sentenced to 10 years in prison in France, was extradited to Spain in May 1996. In January 2000, after he had spent three years in prison awaiting trial, the Spanish Supreme Court ordered his release after finding that his crimes had already been tried in France. The prosecutor and the Association of Victims of Terrorism appealed the decision and Ternera was charged again with planning and organising the attack; however, he failed to appear in court and an international arrest warrant was issued and his whereabouts were unknown for around 17 years. Nonetheless, he was arrested in Haute-Savoye on 16 May 2019.
- Francisco Mujika Garmendia, Pakito: on 18 June 1993, he was tried in Paris by the Correctional Tribunal for crimes committed on French soil, and sentenced to 10 years in prison for ordering and providing the material for the attacks committed by the Argala Commando Unit. He was extradited to Spain on 8 February 2000 and judged by the High Court. On 3 June 2003 he was sentenced to 2,354 years in prison for 11 murders and another 88 years for the injuries caused by the attacks.
- José María Arregi Erostarbe, Fitipaldi: Was tried together with Pakito and received the same 2,354 year sentence.
- Henri Parot, alias Unai: tried by the High Court on 8 March 1994, and received what was, at that time, the second-longest sentence in Spanish history: 1,802 years in prison for the attack in Zaragoza. Found guilty of a total of 82 murders, Parot's 26 convictions resulted in a total sentence of 4,800 years in prison.
- Jean Parot, Jacques Esnal, and Frederic Haramboure: Captured in France, they were tried on 19 June 1997 by the French Tribunal and sentenced to spend the rest of their lives in prison. Esnal died in custody on the 18th October 2025.

== Memorials ==
Since 1987, a memorial ceremony has been held every year in Zaragoza. A memorial garden, the "Park of Hope" (Spanish: Parque de la Esperanza), was built at the location of the former barracks. It contains the sculptures of children playing, representing the younger victims of the bombing.

On 11 December 2007, to mark the 20th anniversary of the attack, a wreath-laying ceremony took place at the park, which was attended by Pascual Grasa, who was on guard at the entrance during the bombing, and seriously injured in it. Grasa delivered a speech to the audience in memory of the deceased.

During the 2009 commemoration, Juan Alberto Belloch, Mayor of Zaragoza, unveiled a memorial stone containing the names of the 11 victims. The ceremony was also attended by witnesses and victims of the event.
