= 1986 Madrid bombing =

Car bomb attack by ETA in Madrid, Spain

Plaza República Dominicana bombing
- Part of the Basque conflict
- Location: Madrid, Spain
- Date: 14 July 1986; 07:45 (UTC+2)
- Target: Guardia Civil convoy
- Attack type: Car bombing
- Deaths: 12
- Injuries: 32
- Perpetrator: ETA

A car bomb attack was carried out by the armed Basque separatist group ETA in Madrid, Spain, on 14 July 1986, which killed 12 people and injured another 32. The dead were all members of the Guardia Civil studying in the nearby traffic school on Príncipe de Vergara. The ETA members later convicted of participation in the attack included significant figures in the group, including Antonio Troitiño and Iñaki de Juana Chaos.

== Background ==
The "comando España" of ETA had been responsible for 20 deaths in the previous year, these included an attack in Madrid three months earlier, which had resulted in five deaths, and another the previous month which had killed three people. ETA as a whole had been responsible for 24 deaths in 1986 prior to the attack; 18 of those had occurred in Madrid, leading to claims that the organisation was focusing on the Spanish capital because it believed that attacks there had greater influence on public opinion than attacks in the Basque region. The attack had the highest number of casualties since the El Descanso bombing, by suspected jihadists in April 1985, had killed 18 people.

== Targets ==
The police convoy consisted of 70 civil guards, aged between 18 and 25, who had left a traffic school in order to head to Venta de la Rubia, on the outskirts of the Spanish capital, where police engaged in daily practice riding a motorcycle. The convoy consisted of a bus, a minibus and a Land Rover and followed the same route at the same time every day, making it easier for ETA to target it.

== The attack ==
The car bomb was loaded with 35 kilos of Goma-2 explosives and significant quantities of shrapnel and was triggered by remote control by Antonio Troitiño, who had been waiting for the passing of the convoy at a nearby bus stop. One of ETA's most active members, Jose Ignacio de Juana Chaos, was waiting nearby in a vehicle to flee. The explosion threw the bus into the air. Four officers were killed instantly and 32 others were injured, including six civilians. A further four officers were pronounced dead shortly afterward at the nearby La Paz clinic, with a ninth dead announced at 21:30 the same day, and three others dying of their injuries later. Those injured included commuters waiting at a nearby bus stop, while cars and property in the Plaza were also damaged.

== Reactions ==
The Plaza República Dominicana attack occurred three weeks after the general election and one day before the newly elected parliament opened. There was also speculation that the attack was in response to the French government's decision the previous day to extradite José Iturbe, the alleged military leader of ETA, from Gabon to face trial, though this theory was challenged by the Deputy Prime Minister Alfonso Guerra, who pointed out that such an attack would have required a longer period of planning.

Mayor of Madrid, Juan Barranco Gallardo, called for solidarity with the victims and their families and requested a three-minute silence at midday the same day.

== Arrests ==
Antón Troitiño, alias 'Miguel Ángel' and José Ignacio de Juana Chaos were apprehended on 16 January 1987, when anti-terrorist police mounted an operation against their base of operations, a flat on Río Ulla Street in Madrid. Four other ETA members: Cristina Arrizabalaga, María Teresa Rojo, Esteban Esteban Nieto, Inés del Río Prada and Inmaculada Noble were arrested in the same operation. In 1989, Troitiño was convicted of 22 murders and sentenced to 2,232 years in prison. However he was released from prison on 13 April 2011. Inés del Río Prada received sentences totalling 3,828 years for her participation in this and other attacks. These sentences were to run concurrently, making her eligible for release in 2008. However the new government of Mariano Rajoy changed the laws, making ETA prisoners ineligible for early release on good behaviour grounds. As a result, del Río Prada became ineligible for release until 2017. She challenged this at the European Court of Human Rights and won her case, resulting in her release on 22 October 2013.
