= List of massacres in Spain =

The following is a list of massacres that have occurred in Spain (numbers may be approximate):

== Reconquista ==
Name	Date	Location	Deaths	Perpetrators	Notes
Day of the Ditch [es]	797 or 807	Toledo	400 - 700	Emirate of Córdoba	700 city notables massacred in a special ditch by Muslim army under Amrus ibn Yusuf
Martyrs of Córdoba	851	Cordoba	48	Emirate of Córdoba	Forty-eight Christians executed by Muslims
Cordoba massacre	1013	Cordoba	2,000	Berbers	Invading soldiers under Sulayman ibn al-Hakam sacked and pillaged the city resulting in the deaths of many people and Jews.
1066 Granada massacre	30 December 1066	Granada	4,000	Muslim mob	Muslim mobs massacred Jews
Toledo massacre	7 May 1355	Toledo	1,200	Henry of Trastámara	Henry of Trastámara leads forces that kill 1,200 Jews in Toledo
Seville massacre	6 June 1391	Seville	4,000	Christian mob	Mob kills 4,000 Jews.
Córdoba massacre	June 1391	Cordoba	2,000	Christian mob	Mob kills 2,000 Jews.

== Habsburg Spain ==
Name	Date	Location	Deaths	Perpetrators	Notes
Portuguese invasion of Couto Misto	1517–1518	Couto Misto	Unknown	Portuguese forces	Portuguese forces led by Antonio de Araújo, attacked the village of Pena in the region of Couto Misto, killing all the men
Galera massacre	10 February 1570	Galera	2,500	Spanish Army	Spanish Army under John of Austria massacres 2,500 Moriscos.
Corpus de Sang	7–10 June 1640	Barcelona	12–20	Catalan peasants	Between 12 and 20 royal officials, including the Viceroy of Catalonia, were killed by the rioters. The massacre was one of the first events of the Reapers' War.
Battle of Cambrils	13–16 December 1640	Cambrils, Principality of Catalonia	700	Spanish Army	Massacre of 700 defenders tried to surrender by Spanish Army

== Bourbon Spain (1701–1808) ==
Name	Date	Location	Deaths	Perpetrators	Notes
Monte Argintzo massacre	10 July 1794	Monte Argintzo, Baztan Valley	49	Republican French	After the battle, the Republican French massacred 49 French Royalist prisoners

== Independence War, Kingdom of Spain and First Republic (1808–1875) ==
Name	Date	Location	Deaths	Perpetrators	Notes
Dos de Mayo Uprising	3 May 1808	Madrid	113	Grande Armée	French Army under Joachim Murat executed 113 Spanish rebels
Valencia massacre	5 to 6 June 1808	Valencia	400	Baltasar Calvo and his followers	Massacre of French civilians by anti-French mob led by Baltasar Calvo
Siege of Badajoz (1812)	6 April 1812	Badajoz	200–300	Anglo-Portuguese Army	Marauding troops from the Anglo-Portuguese Army under the command of Earl of Wellington kill between 200 and 300 Spanish civilians after capturing the city
San Sebastián sack	8 September 1813	San Sebastián	1,000	Anglo-Portuguese Army	After besieging San Sebastián, Allied British and Portuguese soldiers rampaged out of control through San Sebastián, abusing and murdering many of its civilian inhabitants and setting fire to many of the city's buildings. killing an unknown number of inhabitants but they may amount to 1,000
San Andrés beach mass execution	11 December 1831	Málaga	49	Spanish Army	49 Liberal rebels, including their leader José María de Torrijos y Uriarte, were executed extrajudicially by firing squad.
Massacre of Heredia	17 March 1834	Heredia	118	Carlists	Carlists execute 118 Liberal prisoners of war. The massacre was ordered by general Tomás de Zumalacárregui.
1834 massacre of friars in Madrid	17 July 1834	Madrid	73	Anti-clerical liberals	Mobs assaulted and burned convents in the capital after a rumor spread that the friars had poisoned the water to favor the Carlist offensive. 73 friars were killed and 11 were injured.
1835 Anti-clerical riots	Summer 1835	Aragón and Catalonia	78	Anti-clerical liberals	Mobs assaulted and burned monasteries, killing 70 friars and 8 priests. The most important mutinies happened in Reus, Barcelona and Zaragoza.
Burjassot massacre	29 March 1837	Burjassot	40 (around)	Carlists	Carlists execute governmental POWs, mostly cadets, reportedly amidst festivious celebrations, wining and dining
Battle of Andoain	14 September 1837	Andoain	60	Carlists	Carlists permit the crowd to lynch 60 British Auxiliary Legion prisoners of war
[no specific name]	winter 1837/1838	Beceite	1,000 (not clear)	Carlists	following a few victorious battles in Aragon, Catalonia and Levante, Carlists gathered some 1,500 POWs. In November they were marched and incarcerated in the castle and other buildings in Beceite. As winter, usually harsh in this mountainous area, set in, prisoners were mostly neglected. Due to cold, sickness, hunger and mistreatment, there were some 10 POWs dying daily. There were cases of cannibalism.
Calzada massacre	27 February 1838	Calzada de Calatrava	150 (around)	Carlists	during combat for the city, at one point Liberal defenders (some with women and children) barricaded themselves in the Santa María del Valle church and rejected calls to give up. The Carlists brought artillery and started pounding the building. Anyone trying to flee or surrender was killed, the rest died in ruins of the burning and demolished church.
Massacre of Guimerà	19 September 1837	Guimerà	71	liberals	governmental troops execute Carlist POWs
Bombardment of Barcelona (1842)	3 December 1842	Barcelona	20–30	Spanish Army	The bombardment was ordered personally by general Baldomero Espartero to end a revolt that started the previous month and had forced the army to take refuge in Montjuic Castle and Parc de la Ciutadella. The indiscriminate artillery bombardment of the city was made from Montjuïc, killing between 20 and 30 people.
Martyrs of Carral	26 April 1846	Carral	12	Spanish Army	12 rebel leaders of the failed 1846 revolution were executed extrajudicially.
Night of San Daniel	10 April 1865	Madrid	14	Guardia Civil; Various units of the Spanish Army	The Guardia Civil and Spanish Army brutally repressed a group of students of the Central University of Madrid that were protesting in support of the rector of said university. 14 students were killed and 193 were injured.
Berga massacre	27 March 1873	Berga	67	Carlists	once the city has been captured, the formally commanding Alfonso Carlos pledged to respect lives of all POWs. However, once he left the city, the de facto commander Francisco Savalls ordered executions
Enderlaza massacre	4 June 1873	Enderlaza	34	Carlists	following a few hours of Carlist siege of the Carabineros outpost at the border between Navarre and Gipuzkoa, the latter surrendered. The Carlist commander, Manuel Santa Cruz, claiming that defenders had earlier micheviously displayed white flags, ordered execution of all POWs
Cirauqui massacre	12 July 1874	Cirauqui	36	Carlists	following a few hours of combat for the town, eventually 62 liberal defenders, isolated in the church, surrendered. When leaving the building they were assaulted by the crowd, with apparently passive or perhaps even permissive attitude of Carlist commanders. During the carnage, 36 defenders have been lynched, mostly with canes or agricultural tools/
Massacre of Olot	15-30 July 1874	Olot	100 (unclear)	Carlists	having defeated liberal troops during the battle of Toix, Carlists then executed some 35 POWs. As the result of the battle, Olot surrendered without a fight. During some 2 weeks, Carlists kept killing officers, NCOs, customs officials and other functionaries
Looting of Cuenca	15/16 July 1874	Cuenca	40 (around)	Carlists	following earlier siege of the city, which lasted some 3 days, Carlist troops overpowered the defenders. During the following 2 days the victorious troops turned into pillaging gangs, killing POWs and looting the city. Earlier prints claimed 700 fatalities, yet there are some 40 fatal victims identified. "Saco de Cuenca" became the icon of Carlist barbarity, present in public narrative for some 50 years to come

== Restoration (1875–1931) ==
Name	Date	Location	Deaths	Perpetrators	Notes
Rio Tinto massacre	4 February 1888	Minas de Riotinto	13 according to the official count, with some estimates claiming up to 200	Spanish Army	In the Plaza de la Constitución, around 200 people were shot dead by two companies of the Spanish Army when they protested for better wages and the end of the emission of toxic fumes in the mines. Protestors were mainly workers of the local mines, led by anarchist Maximiliano Tornet. The massacre lasted only 15 minutes and the bodies of the dead were probably buried under the slag of a mine.
Bombing of the Gran Teatro del Liceo	7 November 1893	Barcelona	20	Anarchist Santiago Salvador	On the opening night of the theatre season and during the second act of the opera Guillaume Tell by Rossini, two Orsini bombs were thrown into the stalls of the opera house. Only one of the bombs exploded; some twenty people were killed and many more were injured. The attack was the work of the anarchist Santiago Salvador and deeply shocked Barcelona, becoming a symbol of the turbulent social unrest of the time. The Liceu reopened its doors on 18 January 1894, but the seats occupied by those killed were not used for a number of years.
Bombing of the Corpus Christi procession in Barcelona	7 June 1897	Barcelona	12	Unidentified (forced confessions were made through torture)	An Italian anarchist attacked the Corpus Christi procession, which had just left the Church of Santa Maria del Mar, killing twelve people. The bombing led to the Montjuïc trial, in which about 400 suspects were arrested, from whom 87 were put on trial and, after confessions made under torture, five were executed.
A Coruña massacre	30–31 May 1901	A Coruña (Galicia)	8	Guardia Civil	The Guardia Civil shot striking workers, killing 8.
Carnival massacre in Vigo	24 February 1903	Vigo	3	Guardia Civil	Guardia Civil fired at a crowd of protesting workers during the local carnival festivities, killing 3 people, including a 12-year-old.
Morral affair	31 May 1906	Madrid	24	Anarchist Mateu Morral	Attempted regicide of Spanish King Alfonso XIII and his bride, Victoria Eugenie, on their wedding day. The attacker, Mateu Morral, acting on a desire to spur revolution, threw a bomb concealed in a flower bouquet from his hotel window as the King's procession passed, killing 24 bystanders and soldiers, wounding over 100 others, and leaving the royals unscathed. Morral sought refuge from republican journalist José Nakens but fled in the night to Torrejón de Ardoz, whose villagers reported him. Two days after the attack, militiamen accosted Morral, who killed one before killing himself. Morral was likely involved in a similar attack on the king a year prior.
Oseira massacre	22 April 1909	Parish of Oseira, San Cristovo de Cea (Galicia)	7	Guardia Civil	The Guardia Civil shot residents who protested against the transfer of several artistic pieces of value from the local convent.
Nebra massacre	12 October 1912	Parish of Nebra, Porto do Son (Galicia)	5	Guardia Civil	Around 300 peasants were protesting in the bridge of Cans against a new tax ordered by the mayor to solve the local deficit. The Civil Guard fired indiscriminately at the demonstrators, killing 5 people and injuring 32.
El Descargador incidents	7 March 1916	La Unión, Murcia	7	Guardia Civil; Regimiento de Infantería "Sevilla" n.º 33 of the Spanish Army	Guardia Civil and a unit of the Spanish Army opened fire at a crowd of striking workers in La Unión, killing 7 and injuring 16.
Repression of the 1917 General Strike	August 1917	Industrial and miner areas of the country	71	Guardia Civil; Spanish Army	71 workers were killed by the Guardia Civil and the Spanish Army during the General Strike of 1917.
Bread riots in Málaga	9–21 January 1918	Málaga	4	Guardia Civil	A popular revolt against an increase in bread prices was repressed by the Guardia Civil, causing 4 deaths.
Bread riots in Ferrol	9–15 March 1918	Ferrolterra (Galicia)	9	Spanish Army; Guardia Civil	A popular revolt against an increase in bread prices was repressed by the Spanish Army and the Guardia Civil, causing 9 deaths.
Sofán massacre	16 February 1919	Parish of Sofán, Carballo (Galicia)	4	Guardia Civil	4 peasant women were killed by the Guardia Civil.
Sobredo massacre	28 November 1922	Parish of Guillarei, Tui (Galicia)	3	Guardia Civil	3 peasants were killed by the Guardia Civil during a protest against the semi-feudal land system that existed in Galicia at the time, the "foros", (Note: The Foros were abusive contracts between the peasants and the landowners in Galicia until their total abolition in 1926. Foros were long-term or often perpetual, so that a person or institution ceded the use or/and benefit of a thing (almost always a land), in exchange for the fulfillment of various conditions previously laid down. This conditions were normally a part of the agrarian production or a part of the monetarian of the production. Sometimes the peasants had to pay up to the 50% of its production. It was a mode of semifeudal exploitation of the land, with the owners usually being fidalgos (low nobility), priests or rich peasants.) that were finally abolished in 1926.
La Pobla de Ferran massacre	21 May 1928	Pobla de Passanat, Catalonia	10	José Marimon Carles	Mass murder incident.

== Second Republic (1931–1936) ==
Name	Date	Location	Deaths	Perpetrators	Notes
Castilblanco events	31 December 1931	Castilblanco (Extremadura)	4	Local peasants affiliated with the UGT	4 Civil Guards were lynched by local landless peasants affiliated with the National Federation of Land Workers (part of the Unión General de Trabajadores (UGT)).
Arnedo incident	5 January 1932	Arnedo (La Rioja)	11	Guardia Civil	Local workers, organized by the socialist union UGT launched a strike in a shoe factory. The Guardia Civil killed 11 and injured 30 during a protest, part of the strike, in the Plaza de la República.
Casas Viejas incident	11 January 1933	Benalup-Casas Viejas	24-26	Guardia de Asalto	Spanish police burned and shot 24 anarchists
Martyrs of Turon	October 1934	Turón (Mieres)	8	Asturian revolutionaries	A group of eight De La Salle Brothers and a Passionist priest were executed by revolutionaries. They were canonized in 1999 by Pope John Paul II.
Repression after the failed 1934 Asturian revolution	October 1934	Asturias	200	Spanish Legion; Guardia Civil; Moroccan Regulares	Around 200 individuals were killed in the repression following the failed revolution (among them the journalist Luis de Sirval, who pointed out tortures and executions and was arrested and killed by three officers of the Legion).
"Martirs of Carbayín"	22–24 October 1934	Santa Marta Carbayín, Siero (Asturias)	24	Guardia Civil	24 left-wing individuals were killed extrajudicially in the repression following the failed Asturian revolution after being tortured for days.
Incidents during the funeral of Anastasio de los Reyes	16 April 1936	Madrid	5	Guardia de Asalto	Guardia de Asalto opened fire at the funeral procession of Anastasio de los Reyes, a Guardia Civil killed by left-wingers 2 days before, killing 5 people.
Events of Yeste	29 May 1936	Yeste, Albacete	18 (Note: 17 civilians a 1 Civil Guard.)	Guardia Civil	when escorting detainees the civiles were assaulted by a group of farmers and opened fire in return

== Civil War (1936–1939) ==
Name	Date	Location	Deaths	Perpetrators	Notes
Red Terror (Spain)	1936–1939	across Spain	38,000–45,000 (scholarly consensus) (Note: Up to 72,344 depending on the source.)	Republicans	
White Terror (Spain)	1936–1945	across Spain	150,000–250,000 (scholarly consensus) (Note: 58,000-400,000 depending on the source.)	Nationalists	
17 July Massacre of Melilla	17 July 1936	Melilla	189	Nationalists	The same day as the coup d'état all the members of trade unions, left-wing parties, Masonic lodges and anyone known to have voted for the Popular Front were arrested. On the first night, the Nationalists executed 189 civilians and soldiers. This was the first massacre of the Civil War.
Córdoba massacres during the first weeks of the war	18 July – August 1936	Córdoba	2,000	Nationalists	On 18 July, the military governor of Córdoba, Ciriaco Cascajo, started the coup in the city, bombing the civil government and arresting the civil governor, Rodríguez de León. After that, he and the civil guard officer Bruno Ibañez, Don Bruno (sent there by general Queipo de Llano, furious because no reprisals had been carried out yet), carried out a bloody repression, with 2,000 executions just in the first weeks.
Valladolid massacres	19 July – September 1936	Cemetery of El Carmen, Valladolid	1,000	Nationalists	Around 1,000 people were killed in the cemetery during the first months of the war. There are 10 known mass graves in the cemetery.
Zaragoza cemetery massacres	19 July 1936 – April 1939	Cemetery of Torrero, Zaragoza	3,096	Nationalists	3,096 republicans were killed in the cemetery during the war in successive mass executions.
Palencia massacres	20 July 1936 – 1938	Cemetery of El Carmen, Palencia	497	Nationalists	At least 497 people were killed in the Municipal Cemetery, mainly during the first months of the war, although some executions also happened in 1937 and 1938. The mass grave is known as the Fosa de los Alcaldes.
Beatos Mártires Claretianos de Barbastro	20 July – 18 August 1936	Barbastro (Aragón)	51-52	Republicans	Anarchist CNT-AIT militias killed 51 or 52 Claretians and seminarists in 5 successive mass executions.
Beatos Mártires Benedictinos de Barbastro	20 July – 18 August 1936	Barbastro (Aragón)	18	Republicans	18 Benedictine monks of the El Pueyo monastery killed by Anarchist CNT-AIT militias.
Bombing of Otxandio	22 July 1936	Otxandio (Bizkaia)	57-61	Nationalists	2 Breguet XIX bombers attacked the main square of Otxandio during the celebration of the "fiestas de Santa María", killing 57 or 61 people, almost all of them civilians.
Seville massacres	22 July 1936 – January 1937	Seville	3,028	Nationalists	
Mass executions in the Cemetery of Granada	23 July 1936 – 1 April 1939	Granada	5,000	Nationalists	Around 5,000 people were killed in various mass-executions in the Cemetery of San José (Grajada) during the war, most of them during the first year. The most famous victim was Federico García Lorca. After the war ended the cemetery continued being used as an execution site for political prisoners until 1956.
Monte de Estépar massacres	2 August – 12 October 1936	Estépar, Province of Burgos	371–1,000	Nationalists	The mass graves of Estépar (or of Mount Estépar) are a set of mass graves located in a hill near the village of Estépar (Province of Burgos). In these places hundreds of people were killed and buried. It is documented and confirmed that 371 people were killed and buried there, but some historians increase the figure to about 1,000. Between 2 August, just two weeks after the start of the war, and on 12 October sixteen "sacas" were registered in the Prison of Burgos. In those "sacas" prisoners were taken to be extrajudicially executed and buried in hidden mass graves.
Mártires escolapios de Barbastro	20 July – 18 August 1936	Barbastro (Aragón)	10	Republicans	10 piarists were killed by Anarchist CNT-AIT militias.
Mártires escolapios de Alcañiz	20 July – 18 August 1936	Alcañiz (Aragón)	9	Republicans	9 piarists were killed by Anarchist CNT-AIT militias.
Executions of the ships España 3 and Sil	14–15 August 1936	Cartagena	214-215	Republicans	Massacre of prisoners who were held in two prison ships in the port of Cartagena.
Almendralejo 14 August massacre	14 August 1936	Almendralejo (Extremadura)	40	Nationalists	40 republican soldiers were executed after surrendering.
1936 Massacre of Badajoz	15 August 1936	Badajoz	1,341–4,000	Nationalists	
Madrid Modelo Prison massacre	22–23 August 1936	Madrid	24–30	Republicans	Anarchist militias entered the Modelo Prison and killed dozens of prisoners, including important rightwing figures such as Ramón Álvarez Valdés, Melquíades Álvarez, Joaquín Fanjul or José María Albiñana. This, and other massacres by uncontrolled militias, led to a crisis in the Republican government, that was solved with the creation of the Popular Courts, that were expected to appease the revolutionary excesses and offer at least some judicial guarantees to the defendants.
Estrella prison sacas	5–24 September 1936	Estella-Lizarra (Navarre)	81	Nationalists	81 republican prisoners of the Estella prison were killed extrajudicially in 7 mass-executions.
Plaza de Colón bombing	October 1936	Madrid	16	Nationalists	16 people dead and 60 wounded in Nationalist air raid against Madrid. Six bombs detonated in the Plaza de Colón, in the middle of the city. One bomb fell into a queue of women waiting for milk. The air raid was made by German pilots in Junkers Ju 52s. Madrid had no air defenses to prevent enemy aircraft from flying over the city.
Hernani mass executions	October 1936	Hernani (Gipuzkoa)	128–200	Nationalists	Around 200 people were extrajudicially executed by firing squad at the Hernani cemetery in October 1936. Among those executed there were priests, members of political parties and trade unions, pregnant women and even a 17-year-old. Virtually none of the victims had significant political responsibilities during the Republic.
Tafalla prison saca	17–21 November 1936	Tafalla (Navarre)	86	Nationalists	86 republican prisoners of the Tafalla prison were killed extrajudicially in various mass-executions.
Atlante prison-ship massacre	18–20 November 1936	Mahón (Minorca)	75	Republicans	75 people (37 priests and monks, 37 civilians and military) imprisoned in the Atlante prison-ship, anchored in Mahón, were killed by a mob as a revenge for a nationalist bombing over the city just hours before.
Paracuellos massacres	November–December 1936	Paracuellos del Jarama, Torrejón de Ardoz	1,000–4,000	Republicans	
Navas del Madroño massacre	15 January 1937	Cáceres	68	Nationalists	68 residents of the town of Navas del Madroño were arrested and killed by a squad of Civil Guards and Falangists.
La Fatarella incidents	25 January 1937	La Fatarella (Catalonia)	23–34	Republicans (Note: Victims were also Republicans.)	Peasants opposed to the collectivizations of the anarcho-syndicalist union CNT-AIT were executed by anarchists. The peasants were supported by other Republican organizations like the socialist UGT, Republican Left of Catalonia or the Unió de Rabassaires. The killings ended with the intervention of the Generalitat and the Guardia de Asalto. This was one of the first conflicts between different republican factions.
Bilbao prisons massacre	4 January 1937	Bilbao	224	Republicans	A mob, formed mainly my UGT and CNT militias, assaulted the 5 prisons of Bilbao and massacred 224 national prisoners in revenge for a bombing that happened in the city that same morning.
Málaga-Almería road massacre	8 February 1937	Málaga-Almería road	3,000–5,000	Nationalists	
Málaga massacres	8 February – December 1937	Málaga	2,300–4,000	Nationalists	After the fall of the city, nationalists took an enormous number of prisoners, with thousands of them being executed in the following weeks.
Bombing of Albacete	19 February 1937	Albacete	150	Nationalists	The Nazi Condor Legion bombed the city, killing around 150 people.
Bombing of Durango	31 March 1937	Durango	248–336	Nationalists	German and Italian transport planes modified to carry bombs (German Ju 52 and Italian Savoia-Marchetti SM.81) from the Condor Legion and the Aviazione Legionaria bombed Durango in relays. Two churches were bombed during the celebration of mass, killing 14 nuns and the officiated priest. Furthermore, Heinkel He 51 fighters strafed fleeing civilians. Altogether, around 250 civilians died in the attack.
Bombing of Jaén	1 April 1937	Jaén	159	Nationalists	Six German Ju 52 bombers of the German Legion Condor bombed the city, which had no legitimate military targets or anti-aircraft defenses. Current estimates indicated there were 159 deaths among the civilian population and several hundred injured, comparable with the Bombing of Guernica, which occurred four weeks later.
Revenge killings of Jaén	2–7 April 1937	Jaén	128	Republicans	As a reprisal for the Bombing of Jaén, the local republican authorities executed 128 Nationalist prisoners.
Bombing of Guernica	26 April 1937	Gernika	150–300 (Note: The exact number has historically been controversial. More details in Casualties of the bombing of Guernica.)	Condor Legion	The city of Gernika was destroyed in a deliberate bombing against civilians.
Bombing of Sestao	23 May 1937	Sestao	22–25	Nationalists	Nazi Condor Legion bombed the town in a deliberate attack against civilians.
Bombardment of Almería	31 May 1937	Almería	19–20	Nationalists	The Kriegsmarine bombed the city in retaliation for a Republican air attack on the German cruiser Deutschland.
July 1937 Bombing of Tarragona	29 July 1937	Tarragona	51	Nationalists	Bombing of civilians by the Italian Aviazione Legionaria. 51 people died and 104 were injured.
3 October bombing of Valencia	3 October 1937	Valencia	50	Nationalists	5 Savoia-Marchetti S.M.81 of the Italian Aviazione Legionaria bombed the city. 50 people died, 78 were injured and 160 buildings were destroyed.
1937 Bombing of Lleida	2 November 1937	Lleida	150–300	Nationalists	Bombing of civilians by the Italian Aviazione Legionaria. 48 of the dead were children studying in the Liceu Escolar de Lleida.
Christmas massacre of Cáceres	2 November 1937	Cáceres	196	Nationalists	Various mass-executions of high-profile Republican prisoners in Cáceres, starting on Christmas Day and ending with 196 killed a few days later.
1938 January bombings of Barcelona	1–30 January 1938	Barcelona	185–250	Nationalists	First "terror bombings" over Barcelona, carried by the Italian Aviazione Legionaria. The attacks caused 210 civilian deaths, injured 125 people and destroyed or damaged 87 buildings.
January bombing of Valladolid	25 January 1938	Valladolid	14	Republicans	The Republican Airforce bombed the city, killing 14 civilians and injuring 70 people.
Bombing of Alcañiz	16–18 March 1938	Alcañiz, Province of Teruel	300–500	Nationalists	The town was bombed by the Italian fascist Aviazione Legionaria, deliberately targeting civilians.
1938 March bombings of Barcelona	16–18 March 1938	Barcelona	1,000–1,300	Nationalists	Barcelona was bombed by bombers of the Italian Aviazione Legionaria, the branch of the Italian Air Force fighting in the Spanish Civil War. The first raid came at 22:00 of 16 March by German Heinkel He 51s. After that, there were 17 air raids by the Italian Savoia-Marchetti SM.79 and Savoia-Marchetti SM.81 bombers at three-hour intervals until 15:00 of 18 March. Barcelona had little anti-aircraft artillery and no fighter cover. Up to 1,300 people were killed and at least 2,000 wounded.
1938 bombing of Lleida	27 March 1938	Lleida	400	Nationalists	The Nazi Condor Legion bombed the city to demoralize the local civilian population, causing around 400 deaths.
Bombing of Alicante	25 May 1938	Alicante	275–393	Nationalists	Between seven and nine Italian SM.79 and SM.81 bombers of the Aviazione Legionaria bombed Alicante. The anti-aircraft artillery of the city was obsolete and the air-alarm system of the city did not work. The bombers dropped ninety bombs and many of them fell in the central market of the city. There were between 275 and 393 civilian deaths (100 men, 56 women, 10 children and more than 100 unidentified bodies), and 1000 wounded.
Bombing of Granollers	31 May 1938	Granollers, Catalonia	100–224	Nationalists	The Italian Aviazione Legionaria bombed the town. There were between 100 and 224 civilian deaths.
Bombing of Águilas	3 August 1938	Águilas (Region of Murcia)	11	Nationalists	Aerial bombing of a civilian hospital. All the victims were women and children.
Bombing of La Barceloneta	16 September 1938	La Barceloneta (Barcelona, Catalonia)	31	Nationalists	Aerial bombing of the neighborhood of La Barceloneta. All victims were civilians.
Bombing of Alcoi	20–23 September 1938	Alcoi (Valencian Community)	50	Nationalists	Aerial bombing of the city that lasted 3 days. The main objective of the bombing were the local factories, many of the victims were workers.
Bombing of Sant Vicenç de Calders	8 October 1938	Sant Vicenç de Calders (Catalonia)	40–60	Nationalists	Aerial bombing of the railway station. It was carried out at the behest of Francisco Franco's nationalist government by the Aviazione Legionaria of its Fascist Italian allies.
Bombing of Dénia	18 October 1938	Dénia (Valencian Community)	12	Nationalists	Aerial bombing of the city.
Bombing of Cabra	7 November 1938	Cabra, Andalusia	101–109	Republicans	Three Tupolev SB bombers of the FARE, bombed the town. One of the bombs (200 kilograms) fell on the town's market, killing dozens of civilians. The aircraft dropped six tons of bombs. Most of the bombs exploded in the market and in the working class districts. There were between 101 and 109 civilians dead and 200 wounded
Bombings of Figueres	27 January – 7 February 1939	Figueres, Catalonia	291–400	Nationalists	The city was bombed 18 times in just 13 days. The bombings killed between 291 and 400 civilians and affected around 500 buildings, including schools, the local hospital and the local cemetery. The attack did not have any military justification or aims.
Bombing of La Garriga	29 January 1939	La Garriga, Catalonia	13	Nationalists	La Garriga was a tiny town of 10,000 inhabitants (among them 7,000 refugees from Madrid and the Basque Country), without air defenses. On 28 January the retreating Lister's troops left the town and fled to the north and the following day ten Italian Savoia-Marchetti bombers, bombed the town. On 29 January, the Italian bombers, attacked the town again. There were 13 civilian deaths, among them five refugees and seven children.
Bombing of Xàtiva	29 January 1939	Xàtiva, Valencian Community	129	Nationalists	Aerial bombing of the railway station. It was carried out at the behest of Francisco Franco's nationalist government by the Aviazione Legionaria of its Fascist Italian allies.
Bombing of Sant Hilari Sacalm	31 January 1939	Sant Hilari Sacalm, Catalonia	12	Nationalists	Aerial bombing of the town. It was carried out at the behest of Francisco Franco's nationalist government by the Aviazione Legionaria of its Fascist Italian allies. 12 people were killed.

== Francoism (1939–1975) ==
Name	Date	Location	Deaths	Perpetrators	Notes
White Terror (Spain) (Killed after the War)	1939–1945	across Spain	58,000–400,000	Francoist regime	
Mass executions in El Camp de la Bota	1939–1952 (Note: The vast majority of the mass killings happened in the first years)	Sant Adrià de Besós (near Barcelona)	1,717	Guardia Civil, Spanish Army and Falangists	Various mass executions were held in the area, after the end of the Spanish Civil War.
Mass executions in the Cemetery of La Almudena	1939–1944	Madrid	2,933	Guardia Civil, Spanish Army and Falangists	Various mass executions were held in the cemetery after the end of the Spanish Civil War.
Mass executions in Paterna	1939–1956 (Note: The vast majority of the mass killings happened in the first years)	Paterna (Valencian Community)	2,238	Guardia Civil, Spanish Army and Falangists	Various mass executions were held in the local cemetery after the end of the Spanish Civil War, there are 70 common graves with the remains of those shot.
Mass executions in the cemetery of Zaragoza	1939–1946	Zaragoza	447	Guardia Civil, Spanish Army and Falangists	Various mass executions were held in the cemetery after the end of the Spanish Civil War. During the war another 3,096 people had already been killed there.
Mass executions in Gijón	1939–1949	Gijón	408 (Note: Counting those killed between April 1939 and 1949.)	Guardia Civil, Spanish Army and Falangists	After the war 408 people were killed by the new regime in or around the city of Gijón. The bodies are buried in the common burials of Ceares/El Sucu. Another 1,526 republicans were killed (judicially or extrajudicially) during the war.
Massacre of Alía	16 August 1942	Alía (Extremadura)	24	Guardia Civil	Extrajudicial execution of a group of people suspected of collaborating with the anti-Francoist guerrilla by agents of the Civil Guard. The victims were 24 inhabitants of the towns of Alía and La Calera, who were killed in a field near the first town.
Massacre of Monroyo	11 November 1947	Monroyo (Aragón)	6–8	Guardia Civil	Extrajudicial execution of a group of people suspected of collaborating with the anti-Franco guerrilla by agents of the Civil Guard
Massacre of Pozo Funeres	March and April 1948	Pozu Funeres, Laviana (Asturias)	9-18	Guardia Civil and Falangists	Extrajudicial executions of people suspected of collaborating with the anti-Francoist guerrilla by Falangists and Guardia Civil agents. The victims were nine militants and relatives of left-wing militants, who were killed near a pit cave located in the Peñamayor range, known as the Pozu Funeres. The victims were then thrown into the cave.
Massacre of Cortijo del Enjembraero	1 February 1949	Near the village of Helechal, Benquerencia de la Serena (Extremadura)	4	Guardia Civil	Extrajudicial execution of 4 peasants suspected of collaborating with the anti-Francoist guerrilla by agents of the Guardia Civil.
Madrid spree	19 and 21 July 1958	Madrid	5	José María Jarabo	José María Jarabo kills four adults and an unborn baby
Construction Strike of Granada	21 July 1970	Granada	3	Armed Police Corps	3 construction workers were killed by the Armed Police.
Alexander family murders	16 December 1970	Santa Cruz de Tenerife, Canary Islands	3	Frank Alexander, Harald Alexander	Frank Alexander, in the company of his father Harald, murdered his mother Dagmar and his sisters Petra and Marina Alexander
Ferrol incidents of 1972	10 March 1972	Ferrol	2	Armed Police Corps	2 workers (Amador Rey and Daniel Niebla, members of the clandestine union CCOO) were killed by the Armed Police. Another 16 were injured by bullets, 160 workers were fired, 101 arrested, 60 incarcerated and 54 fined with between 50,000 and 250,000 pesetas. 10 March is officially commemorated in Galicia as Day of the Galician Working Class.
Assassination of Luis Carrero Blanco	20 December 1973	Madrid	3	ETA	
Cafetería Rolando bombing	13 September 1974	Madrid	13	ETA political-military	The attack killed 13 people and wounded 71.

== Transition (1975–1982) ==
Name	Date	Location	Deaths	Perpetrators	Notes
Vitoria massacre	3 March 1976	Vitoria-Gasteiz	5	National Police Corps	More than 150 injured. Another two people were killed in the protests against police violence after the incident, one in Tarragona and another in Basauri.
Montejurra massacre	9 May 1976	Montejurra mountain, near Estella-Lizarra	2	Neofascists and the Spanish Secret Service	Two left-wing Carlist militants were killed and another three seriously wounded by right-wing gunmen at the annual Carlist Party celebration.
Assassination of Juan María de Araluce Villar	4 October 1976	San Sebastián	5	ETA	Three ETA members carrying pistols and submachine guns killed Araluce, the Government appointed President of the Provincial Deputation of Gipuzkoa and member of the Council of the Realm. Araluce's driver was killed in the attack together with three police guards. Ten bystanders were also injured in the attack, which was ETA's deadliest of 1976.
1977 Massacre of Atocha	24 January 1977	Madrid	5	Alianza Apostólica Anticomunista	4 injured
Assassination of Augusto Unceta Barrenechea	24 January 1977	Gernika	3	ETA	Three ETA members carrying pistols and submachine guns killed Unceta, the Government appointed President of the Provincial Deputation of Biscay and Mayor of Guernica. He was ambushed as he arrived to play his weekly sports game. His two bodyguards, Antonio Hernández Fernández-Segura and Ángel Rivera Navarrón were also killed in the attack.
Scala case	15 January 1978	Barcelona	4	Joaquín Gambín Hernández El Grillo (Police confidant)	4 workers (all victims were, members of the CNT themselves) were killed in an incendiary attack after a legal demonstration of the CNT in the center of Barcelona. Originally, both the police and the media blamed the CNT and the anarchist movement, but in the trials (1980–1983) it was discovered that the culprit was a police confidant called Joaquín Gambín. The CNT has always maintained that the attack was a frame-up by the police to stop its growth during the Spanish transition, a position supported by various researchers.
Getxo attack	22 October 1978	Getxo	3	ETA	Gun attack by the Basque separatist organisation ETA which occurred in Getxo, a suburb of Bilbao. 3 Civil Guards were killed.
California 47 Café Attack	26 May 1979	Madrid	9	GRAPO (denied by GRAPO)	A bomb exploded in the Café California 47, in the center of Madrid. 9 people died and 61 were injured. Two First of October Anti-Fascist Resistance Groups (GRAPO) members were condemned in 1981 for the attack, although that organization has always denied that they were the authors of the bombing, blaming it on far-right groups.
July 1979 Madrid bombings	29 July 1979	Madrid	7	ETA political-military	Bomb attacks carried out by ETA political-military (ETA-pm). The attacks, consisting of coordinated bombings in Barajas Airport and the train stations of Atocha and Chamartín, killed 7 people and injured a further 100. The bombings occurred a day after two attacks in Bilbao and San Sebastián, with both attacks killing two people.
Alonsotegi bombing	20 January 1980	Alonsotegi (Bizkaia)	4	Grupos Armados Españoles	Grupos Armados Españoles (GAE), an armed group operating in the Basque Country in the early years of the democratic transition, planted a bomb in a local bar which exploded that evening killing four civilians and wounding ten. The bar was targeted as it was thought to be a meeting point for Basque moderate nationalists in the area. No official inquiries have been made so far.
1980 Bilbao bombing	23 July 1980	Bilbao	3	Alianza Apostólica Anticomunista	A bomb exploded in the Ametzola neighborhood of Bilbao. In the explosion, two teenagers died at the scene and an employee of the municipal cleaning service, was fatally injured.
1980 Markina attack	20 September 1980	Markina-Xemein	4	ETA	Gun attack by the Basque separatist organisation ETA near the town of Markina (Spanish: Marquina). The targets were a group of off-duty civil guards who were having lunch in a bar. Four civil guards were killed.
Caso Almería	10 May 1981	Bilbao	3	Guardia Civil	Three young men were kidnapped, tortured and killed by civil guards who had confused them with members of ETA. Then, they shot them to pretend that they died in a supposed shooting. In 1984 a movie about the incident was released.
September 1982 Rentería attack	14 September 1982	Errenteria	4	ETA	Ambush by the Basque separatist organisation ETA near the town of Errenteria. The targets were several national police officers, four of whom were killed in the attack, with the fifth seriously injured..

== Contemporary Spain (1982–) ==
Name	Date	Location	Deaths	Perpetrators	Notes
Pasaia ambush	22 March 1984	Near Pasaia (Basque Country)	4	National Police Corps	National Policeman ambushed five members of the Comandos Autonomos Anticapitalistas and killed 4 of them.
El Descanso bombing	12 April 1985	Madrid	18	Islamic Jihad Organization	The explosion caused the three-story building to collapse, crashing down on about 200 diners and employees, killing 18 people and injuring 82 others, including fifteen Americans working at the nearby Torrejón Air Base who frequented the restaurant.
Plaza República Dominicana bombing	14 July 1986	Madrid	11	ETA	Bomb attack carried out by the armed Basque separatist group ETA, which killed 12 people and injured a further 32. The dead were all members of the Guardia Civil studying in the nearby traffic school on Príncipe de Vergara. The ETA members later convicted of participation in the attack included significant figures in the group such as Antonio Troitiño and Iñaki de Juana Chaos.
1987 Hipercor bombing	19 June 1987	Barcelona	21	ETA	Car bomb attack by the Basque separatist organisation ETA which occurred at the Hipercor shopping centre on Avinguda Meridiana. The bombing killed 21 people and injured 45, the deadliest attack in ETA's history. Controversy surrounded the timing of telephone warnings made before the attack and the authorities' response to them.
Zaragoza Barracks bombing	11 December 1987	Zaragoza	11	ETA	Car bomb attack by the Basque separatist organisation ETA. A vehicle containing 250 kilograms of ammonal was parked beside the main Guardia Civil barracks; its subsequent explosion caused the deaths of 11 people, including 5 children. A total of 88 people were injured, the majority of them civilians.
Puerto Hurraco massacre	26 August 1990	Puerto Hurraco, Benquerencia de la Serena	9	Brothers Antonio and Emilio Izquierdo	Brothers Antonio and Emilio Izquierdo fired at people in the streets with two shotguns, killing nine and wounding at least six others.
Sabadell bombing	8 December 1990	Sabadell	6	ETA	Car bombing carried out by the armed Basque separatist group ETA. The target was a convoy carrying eight members of the National Police force on the way to police a football game between Sabadell and Málaga CF. Six of the police officers were killed, with the other two injured. Several civilians were also injured in the attack.
1991 Vic bombing	29 May 1991	Vic	10	ETA	A car bomb, carrying more than 200 kg of explosive, exploded outside a Civil Guard barracks. The bombing killed 10 people, including five children, and injured 44 people.
Mutxamel bombing	16 September 1991	Mutxamel	3	ETA	Attempted car bombing by ETA. However the bomb initially failed to explode near its target. The police treated the car as an abandoned vehicle, not realising that it contained a bomb and while being towed away, the car bomb exploded, killing two police officers and the civilian towing the car away.
1992 Madrid bombing	6 February 1992	Madrid	6	ETA	Car bomb attack carried out by the armed Basque separatist group ETA which killed 5 people and injured a further 7. The target was a military vehicle transporting members of the army. The dead included three captains, a soldier driving the vehicle and a civilian working for the armed forces.
1993 Madrid bombings	21 June 1993	Madrid	7	ETA	Car bomb attacks carried out by the armed Basque separatist group ETA, which killed 7 people and injured a further 29. The target was an army vehicle transporting members of the army. The dead included four Lieutenant colonels, a Commander, a Sergeant and the civilian driver of the vehicle.
Puente de Vallecas bombing	11 December 1995	Madrid	6	ETA	Car bomb attack carried out by the armed Basque separatist group ETA in the Puente de Vallecas district of Madrid, which killed 6 people and injured a further 19. The target was a camouflaged army vehicle which was transporting nine civilian employees of the army towards the nearby motorway.
October 2000 Madrid bombing	30 October 2000	Madrid	3	ETA	ETA detonated a large car bomb on Arturo Soria avenue in Madrid. The blast killed three people; a Spanish Supreme Court judge, Francisco Querol Lombardero, his driver, and his bodyguard. One of the injured, a bus driver, died from his injuries days later.
2004 Madrid train bombings	11 March 2004	Madrid	193	Al-Qaeda	2,050 injured
2010 Olot shooting	14 December 2010	Olot (Gerona)	4	Pere Puig Puntí	Mass murder incident.
Pioz murders	17 August 2016	Pioz, Castilla–La Mancha	4	Patrick Nogueira	
2017 Barcelona attacks	17 August 2017	Barcelona	16	Jihadists	16 victims and 8 terrorists dead. 152 injured
