= Cárcel Modelo massacre =

1936 Spanish civil war crime

Coordinates: 40°26′01″N 3°43′12″W

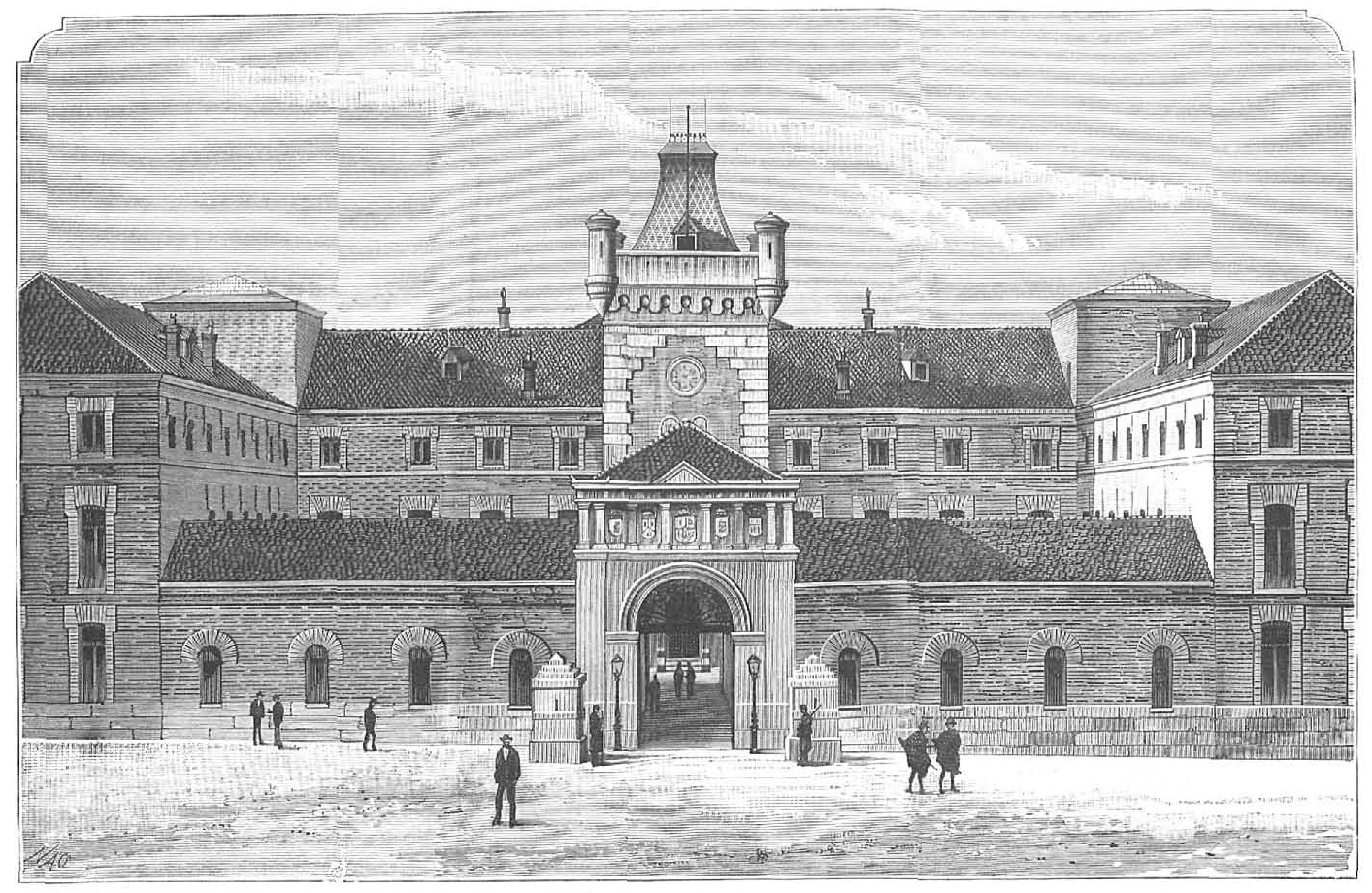
Main façade of the Cárcel Modelo in Madrid, (La Ilustración Española y Americana)

The Cárcel Modelo massacre was the execution of roughly 30 politicians and soldiers by anarchist militiamen who occupied a Madrid prison on 22 August 1936, in the opening months of the Spanish Civil War.

After defeating the 1936 military coup attempt, the Spanish government imprisoned some of the uprising's suspected political and military supporters at the Cárcel Modelo Prison in Madrid. After rumors that the prisoners were escaping, an angry crowd formed outside the prison's gates demanding the execution of the "fascists". A group of anarchist militiamen took control of the prison and executed the prisoners later that night. The reigning Republican government saw its reputation falter from its inability to quell the crowd and protect the prisoners. The incident sparked protests from the diplomatic corps in Madrid.

== Historical context ==
Since April 1931, the Second Spanish Republic had governed Spain. However, following the election of November 1933 where left-wing parties performed well, Nationalists, Monarchists (Carlists and Alfonsist monarchists), and Radical Republicans clashed with the governing Republicans in legal and street fights.

On 13 July 1936, Nationalist fighters (including military officials and troops) revolted against the Republican government.

== Notable victims ==
- Melquíades Álvarez, founder and leader of the Reformist Republican Party
- Manuel Rico Avello, Minister of the Interior, Spanish High Commissioner in Morocco, and Minister of Finance
- Julio Ruiz de Alda, founding member of the Falange Española
- Ramón Álvarez-Valdés, Minister of Justice
- José María Albiñana, founder of the Spanish Nationalist Party

== See also ==
- Badajoz massacre
- Málaga–Almería road massacre
- Montjuïc trial, 1896 torture of anarchist suspects in Barcelona
- Paracuellos massacres

== Bibliography ==
- Casanova, Julián (2010). The Spanish Republic and Civil War. Cambridge University Press. ISBN 9781139490573.
- García Lahiguera, Fernando (1983). Ramón Serrano Súñer: un documento para la historia. Argos Vergara.
- Graham, Helen (2002). The Spanish Republic at War 1936-1939. Cambridge University Press.
- Martín Rubio, Ángel David (1997). Paz, piedad, perdón... y verdad. Editorial Fénix.
- Montoliú, Pedro (2000). Madrid en la guerra civil: La historia. Madrid: Sílex. ISBN 84-7737-072-9.
- Preston, Paul (2013). El Holocausto Español. Odio y Exterminio en la Guerra Civil y después. Barcelona: Debolsillo.
- Reig Tapia, Alberto (1990). Violencia y terror. Madrid: Akal. ISBN 84-7600-693-4.
- Romero Salvadó, Francisco J. (2013). Historical Dictionary of the Spanish Civil War. The Scarecrow Press. ISBN 978-0-8108-5784-1.
- Ruiz, Julius (2014). The 'Red Terror' and the Spanish Civil War. Nueva York: Cambridge University Press. ISBN 978-1-107-05454-7.
- Ruiz-Manjón, Octavio (July 2014). "Violencia vs. representación. Los diputados de las Cortes de 1936, víctimas de la Guerra Civil española". Historia y Política (32).
- Thomas, Hugh (1976). Historia de la Guerra Civil Española. Barcelona: Círculo de Lectores. ISBN 9788497598323.
- Viñas, Ángel (2006). La Soledad de la República: El abandono de las democracias y el viraje hacia la Unión Soviética. Crítica.
