= Mass graves of Estépar =

Areas of mass human remains in Burgos, Spain

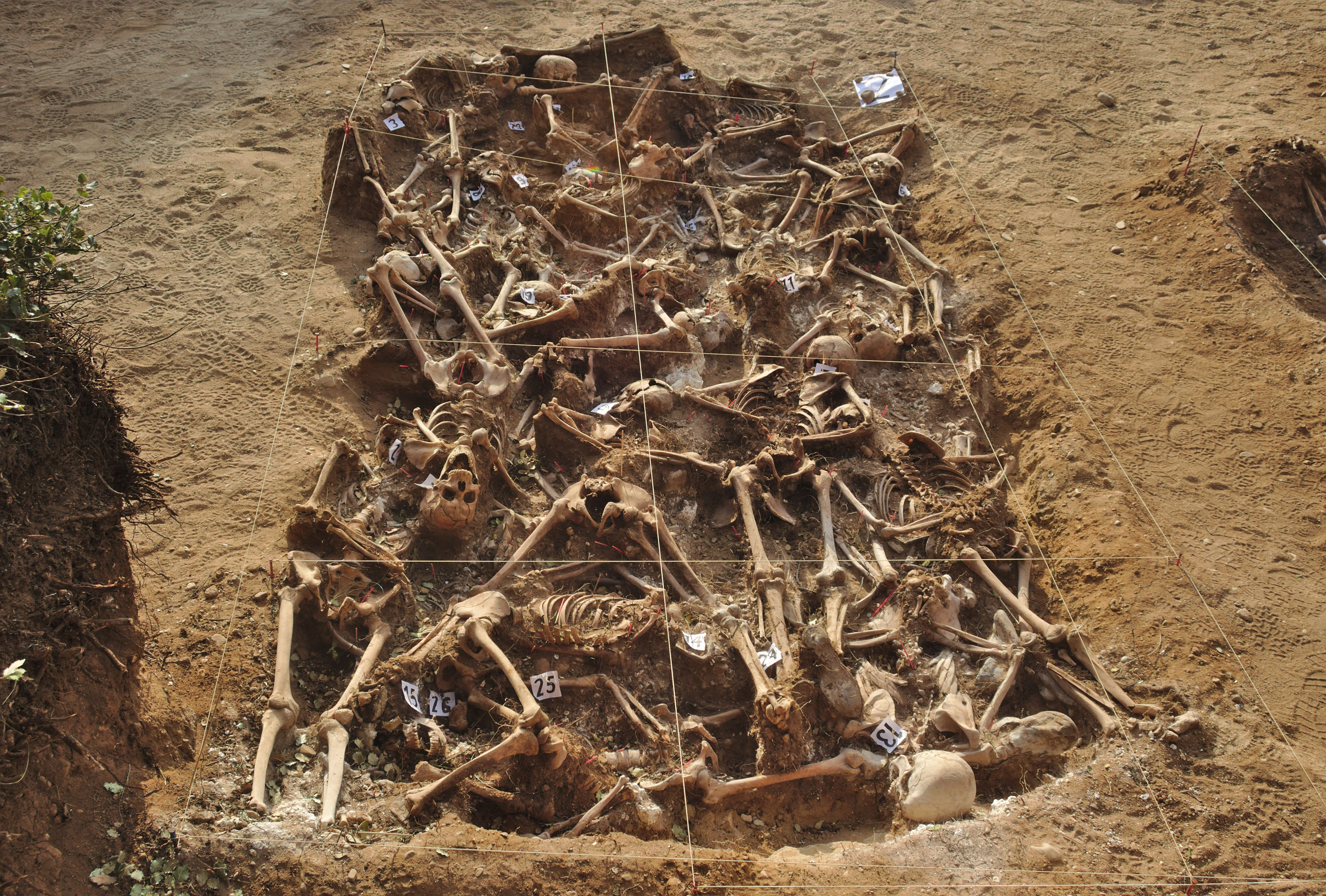

Estépar, a village in the province of Burgos, Spain, is the site of multiple mass graves from the Spanish Civil War. Hundreds of Republicans are believed to have been killed there. Many had been held in detention in Burgos which became the headquarters of the Francoist proto-government following the start of the war in 1936. Prisoners were moved down the Arlanzon valley to Estépar to be killed and buried.

The remains of some of the victims were exhumed in 2014 by the Association for the Recovery of Historical Memory.

== Identification of victims ==
Since its foundation in 2000, the Association for the Recovery of Historical Memory has made efforts to identify the bodies they exhume. However, by at the time the excavations at Estépar began, the Spanish government under Mariano Rajoy had withdrawn state support for such work, and the Association indicated that at this site the task of identification was going to be complex.

The task of identification was still ongoing when in 2017 ninety-six victims were reburied in the cemetery of Estépar. It was hoped that DNA analysis would allow further progress to be made. Among the people believed to have been killed at Estépar who remain to be identified are the composer Antonio José Martínez Palacios and his brother.
