= Ana Carrillo Domínguez =

Anita Carrillo
- Born: Ana Carrillo Domínguez; 1 January 1898; Cortes de la Frontera
- Died: 1974 (aged 76); Madrid
- Occupations: Communist activist, captain in Spanish Republican Army during Spanish Civil War

Ana Carrillo Domínguez (1 January 1898 - 1974), popularly known as Anita Carrillo, was a communist activist and a captain in the Spanish Republican Army.

== Early life ==
Ana Carrillo Domínguez was born in Cortes de la Frontera, on 1 January 1898. Her family moved to Málaga when she was a child. At the age of 18 she married José Torrealba Ordóñez, a member of the Partido Socialista Obrero Español (Spanish Socialist Workers' Party) (PSOE), with whom she settled in La Línea.

== Political activity - campaigning for communism ==
Carrillo was active in calling for votes for the socialist Manuel García Prieto in the November 1933 Spanish general election. She was a frequent contributor to his newspaper La Razón (in Antequera). She toured the villages of the Serranía de Ronda and the Valle del Genal calling on women to vote and to fight for social revolution, the republic and for socialism. After the October Revolution of 1934 in Asturias, and the repression of the government led by Alejandro Lerroux and José María Gil-Robles y Quiñones, Carrillo left the PSOE to join the radio station of the Communist Party of Spain (PCE) in La Línea.

In the February 1936 Spanish general election Carrillo took part in several rallies in La Línea calling for a vote for the Popular Front (Spain). She spoke in the Plaza de Toros in Cádiz as a representative of the PCE on May Day 1936 and closed the 3rd Provincial Conference of the PCE with a speech in June.

== Spanish Civil War and exile ==
After the coup d'état of 18 July 1936, Carrillo fled to Gibraltar on her husband's José's insistence. Whilst there she heard erroneous reports of his death and disguised herself as an "inglesa estrafalaria", (an eccentric Englishwoman) to go and retrieve his body. She discovered he was alive and from there, with her husband, she joined the 15th Anti-Fascist Militia Company of Málaga. Her company was integrated into the Mexico Battalion. In January 1937 the 52nd mixed brigade - at first known as the "B brigade" - was created, and the Mexico Battalion was integrated as one of its four battalions. Carrillo commanded the battalion's machine gun company as a captain of the Ejército Popular Army.

With this rank, and as acting commander due to her husband José Torrealba's injuries inflicted on the Estepona front, Carrillo organised the evacuation of the wounded from Málaga Hospital before the imminent capture of the city by Nationalist troops in early February 1937. She was wounded in the Desbandá, the Málaga–Almería road massacre on her way to Almería. She recounted the events in an interview with Margarita Nelken for the magazine Estampa in March 1937, which made her a Republican heroine.

The Republican army decided to withdraw women from the front line and command of troops soon after which ended her military career. On 20 June 1937, the director general of Security suggested Carrillo as an agent for espionage services behind enemy lines. On 3 March 1938, Franco's government placed her under arrest. With Franco's Nationalist victory in the Spanish Civil War, in 1939 she went into exile in Tangiers.

In August 1954 Carrillo was arrested in Tétouan, in the Spanish protectorate in Morocco, and taken to the Spanish mainland. She remained in prison for a year, when she was pardoned and returned to Tangiers.

Anita Carrillo died in poverty in 1974 in Madrid.
