= Margarita Nelken =

Spanish feminist and writer

Margarita Nelken Mansberger
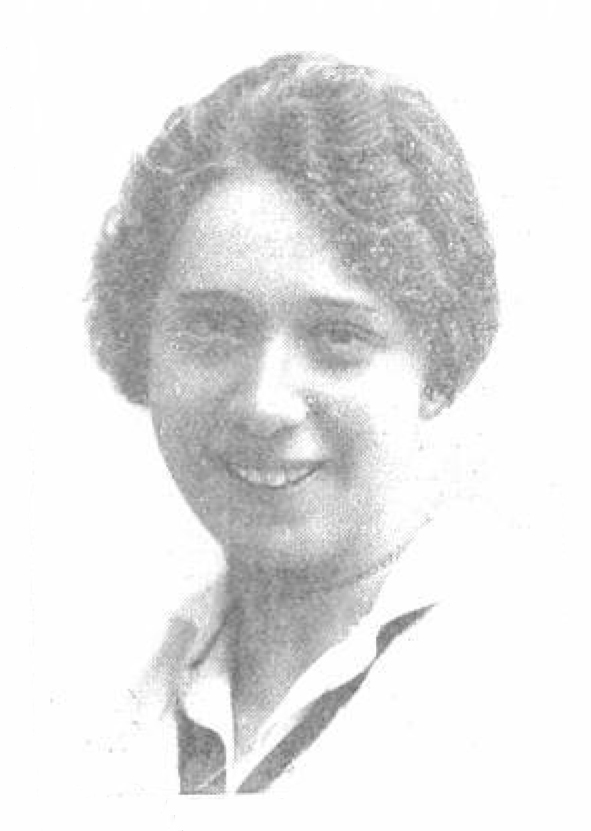
- Born: Margarita Nelken; 07.05.1894; Madrid
- Died: 05.03.1968 (aged 73); Mexico City
- Occupations: Art critics, writer

Margarita Nelken (5 July 1894 – 5 March 1968) was a Spanish feminist and writer. She was a well known intellectual and a central figure in the earliest Spanish women's movement in the 1930s.

== Early life and education ==
Nelken was born María Teresa Lea Nelken y Mansberger in Madrid in 1894. Her parents were of German-Jewish origin and owners of a jewellery store. She studied music, painting and languages, and she learned to speak French, German and English besides her native Spanish. Her sister, Carmen Eva Nelken, was an actress and writer.

== Career and views ==
Nelken wrote books of fiction with a socio-political orientation in the 1920s, including La trampa del arenal (The sand trap, 1923). Her other works include La condición social de la mujer en España (The social condition of women in Spain, 1922) and La mujer ante las cortes constituyentes (1931). She also wrote books about Spanish women writers and Spanish women politicians as well as short stories. She held militant perspective of feminism, claiming that exploitation of women workers had negative effects on both male workers and women. Being fluent in both French and German, Margarita also authored the first complete translation into Spanish of Kafka's seminal work The Metamorphosis and The Trial in 1925.

== Political career ==
In 1931, she became a member of the Spanish Socialist Workers' Party (PSOE) and ran for office in the partial elections in October 1931 as a candidate for the Agrupación Socialista in Badajoz. She was elected to the Constitutive Parliament. She also achieved a position in the Parliament in the elections of November 1933 and February 1936. Although she was a feminist, she rejected the Spanish women's right to vote, arguing that they were not ready for it. A fervent advocate of the Agrarian Reform, she was the victim of attacks from the right because of her ethnicity and her feminist background. After the Asturian Revolution of 1934, she was accused of military rebellion and left Spain. While in exile, she lived in Paris and visited Scandinavia and the Soviet Union, raising funds for the victims of the repression.

She returned to Spain in 1936. After the beginning of the Spanish Civil War, she remained in Madrid, organizing the transfer of the artistic treasures of Toledo to the vault of the Bank of Spain in order to protect them and giving radio speeches in order to raise the morale of the militiamen. Then, disappointed by the leadership of Largo Caballero, she left the PSOE and joined the Communist Party (PCE).

In March 1937, she published an article in the magazine Estampa interviewing Anita Carrillo, a captain in the Spanish Republican Army, who was injured in but survived the Málaga–Almería road massacre, (the Desbandá), an attack by Nationalists on the republican-dominated city of Málaga, Spain and its citizens on 8 February 1937. The article helped to record and publicise the atrocities.

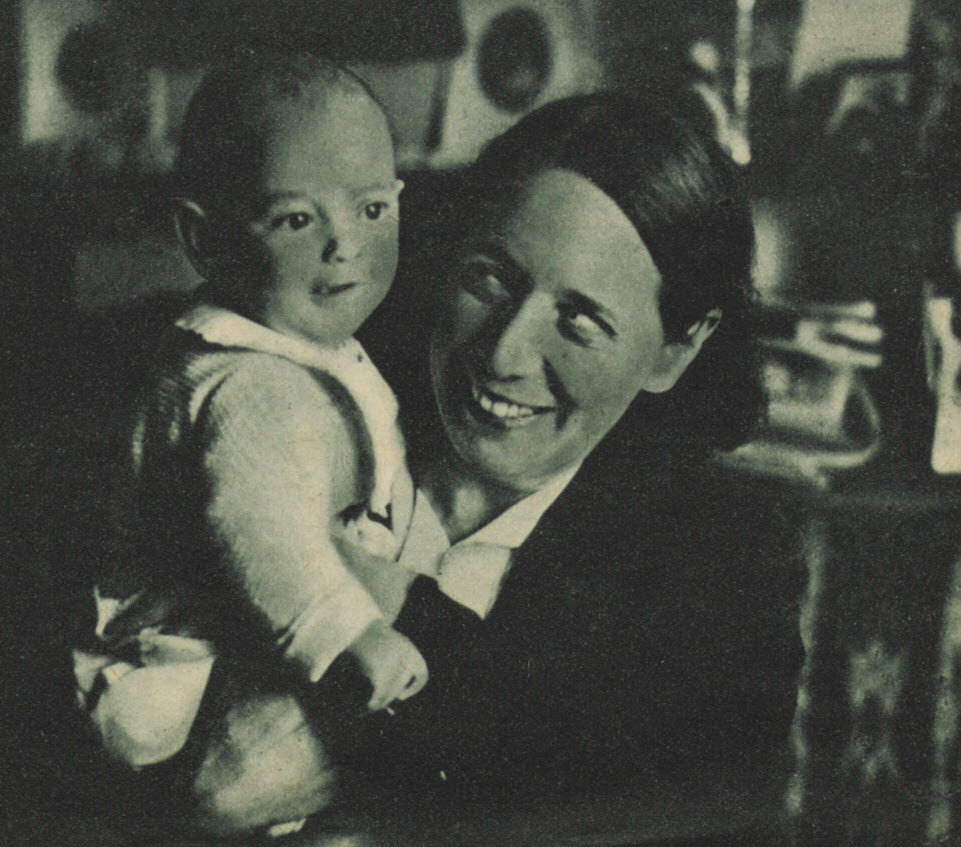
Margarita Nelken and her daughter in 1937.

== Exile and death ==
She served in the Cortes until the end of the war in 1939. Then she and her sister, as Republicans and socialists, went into exile in Mexico. There she worked as an art critic. She also wrote a book: Los judíos en la cultura hispánica ("The Jews in Hispanic Culture"), which was republished by AHebraica in Spain in 2009, over thirty years after her death. Nelken died in Mexico on 9 March 1968.

== Bibliography ==
- Preston, Paul (2002). Doves of war. Four women of Spain. London: HarperCollins. ISBN 9780-00-638694-0.
