= Antonio José Martínez Palacios =

Spanish composer

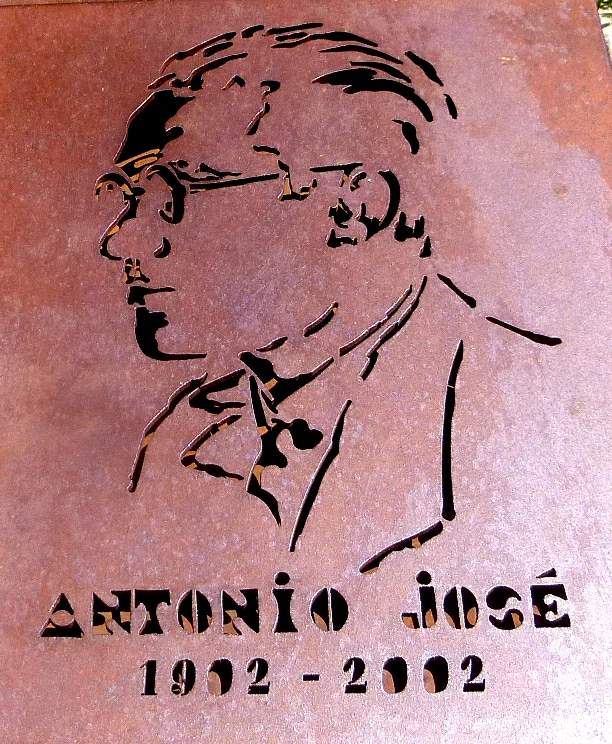
- Monument marking the centenary of the composer's birth
- Born: 12 December 1902; Burgos, Castile and León, Spain
- Died: 11 October 1936 (aged 33); Estépar, Castile and León, Spain
- Occupations: Composer; folklorist

Antonio José Martínez Palacios (12 December 1902 – 11 October 1936), professionally known as Antonio José, was a Spanish composer. Maurice Ravel apparently said of Antonio José: "He will become the Spanish composer of our century", however, his music lay forgotten until the 1980s.

== Career ==
Born in Burgos, Castile and León, Antonio José became a music teacher at a Jesuit school and conducted the city choir in Burgos. The sheer volume of his work (he died at 33) was prodigious. He penned his first composition when he was 14. He was hired as a director of a musical review in Burgos at the age of 18. He wrote extensively for voice in his quest to present the melodies of his native Burgos to the world. His compositions, especially the Sinfonía castellana and Suite Ingenua, put his orchestration on a par with anything at the time in the twentieth century. His most famous work is a sonata for guitar.

His harmonic understanding put him in the forefront of post-impressionist composers, and though a disciple of Ravel, his particular voice and choice of medium set him distinctly apart. His chief biographer, Miguel Ángel Palacios Garoz, points out that Antonio José was not only a prolific composer but a writer with an intellectually facile mind that was open to influences from all fronts of contemporary music.

== Arrest and death ==
Falangists had success in the July 18, 1936 coup, and he was arrested on August 6 and detained in Burgos.

Antonio José was executed by a Falangist firing squad at Estépar, province of Burgos. His body was thrown into one of the Mass graves of Estépar. Like poet and playwright Federico García Lorca, who met a similar fate in the province of Granada, his remains have yet to be identified.

== Musical works ==
- Cazadores de Chiclana (1915)
- Castilian Sonata (1921)
- Poems of Youth (1921)
- Castilian Symphony --one of his most important works. It consists of four movements: "The field", "Paisaje al atardecer", "Nocturno" and "Danza Burgalesa".
- Minatchi (1925) religious-themed opera set in India.
- Hymn to Castile (1929)
- Burgher Dances
- El Mozo de Mulas --completed by Alejandro Yagüe and converted into a concert format, it was finally premiered on November 12, 2017 at the MEH by the Burgos Symphony Orchestra.
- Evocations
- Suite Ingenua for piano and strings
- March for Lead Soldiers
- Guitar Sonata (1933)
- Children's Romance for Guitar
- Galician Sonata (1926) for Piano

== Documentary ==
He is the subject of a 93-minute documentary, Antonio José, Pavana triste, directed by Gregorio Méndez and produced by Sergi Gras.

== Recordings ==
- Sinfonía castellana, Evocaciones, El mozo de mulas, Spanish Classics, Orquesta Sinfónica de Castilla y León, Conductor: Alejandro Posada. Naxos 2005.
- Sonata for Guitar, Laureate Series: Guitar, Marko Topchii, Naxos 2018

== Sources ==
- Gilardino, Angelo (1990). Introduction to Antonio José 'Sonata' . Ancona: Berbèn.
- Palacios Garoz, Miguel Ángel (2002). En tinta roja: cartas y otros escritos de Antonio José. Burgos: Instituto Municipal de Cultura.
