= Spanish Nationalist Party =

Spanish Nationalist Party Partido Nacionalista Español
- Leader: José María Albiñana
- Founded: 1930
- Dissolved: 1936
- Merged into: Traditionalist Communion
- Headquarters: Madrid
- Ideology: Monarchism; Spanish nationalism Corporatism; Traditionalist conservatism National Catholicism
- Political position: Far-right
- Congreso de los Diputados (1936): 1 / 473

Spanish Nationalist Party (PNE; Spanish: Partido Nacionalista Español) was a Spanish nationalist political party active in the Second Spanish Republic. The PNE was founded by José María Albiñana in 1930.

== Ideology ==
The main points of the party platform were:

- Defence of the unity of Spain. Rejection of the Autonomous Regions.
- Respecting the "religious principles".
- Monarchism.
- Defense of social order. Opposition to class struggle.
- "Agrarian nationalism" and promoting cooperation and agricultural credit.
- Equitable taxation.
- Free elementary education and letting popular classes access to middle and upper education.
- Nationalization of health services and social assistance.
- International action to prevent the discrediting of Spain.

The ideological position of the PNE has been defined as "ultra-reactionary" and traditionalist. In fact, in his last will, José María Albiñana asked his followers to join the Traditionalist Communion.

== History ==
The party gained an MP (José María Albiñana) for Madrid in the general elections of 1936. The party was dissolved shortly after the military coup of 1936.
