= Alexander family murders =

1970 child murders in Spain

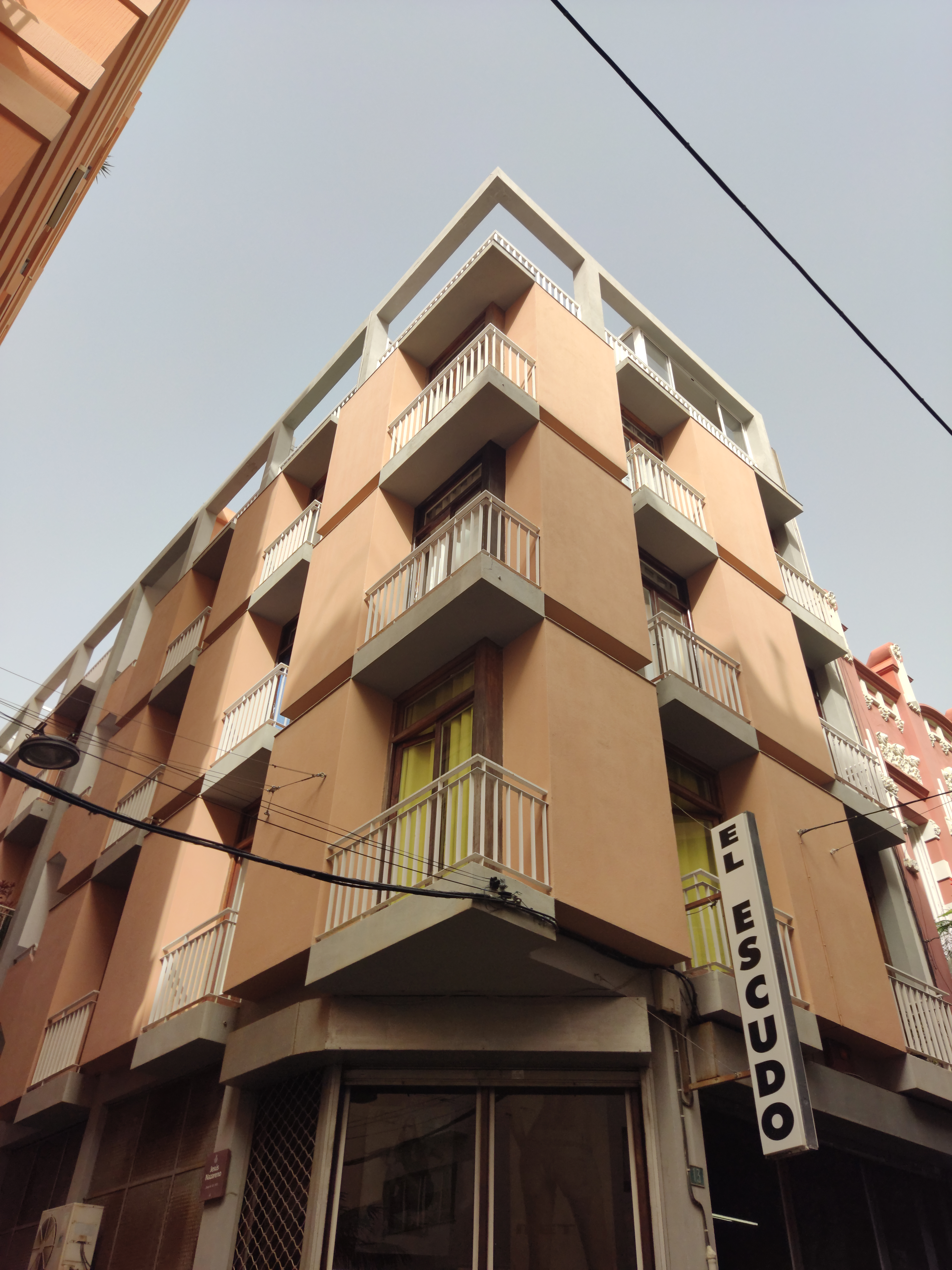
- Building on Jesús de Nazareno Street, site of the murder.
- Location: Santa Cruz de Tenerife, Spain
- Date: December 16, 1970; 55 years ago
- Attack type: Parricide
- Victims: 3
- Perpetrators: Frank Alexander; Harald Alexander (accomplice)
- Motive: Religious fanaticism

The Alexander family murders, also known as the Alexander family massacre and dubbed by the media as the Crime of the century, took place on 16 December 1970 in the city of Santa Cruz de Tenerife, Canary Islands. Frank Alexander, in the company of his father Harald, murdered his mother Dagmar and his sisters Petra and Marina Alexander, in what was the first judicial case attributed to a sect in Spain.

== Background ==
The Alexander family was originally from Hamburg, West Germany. The couple were married sometime in the 1940s. Both Harald and Dagmar came from middle-class families with strong religious convictions, with Harald being raised as a Catholic and Dagmar’s family being part of the Evangelism movement. Around 1943 the Alexanders moved to Harburg, after Harald claimed to have received a message from the archangel Gabriel to abandon his job in the propane distribution business and instead become a bricklayer, a profession attributed to Jesus.

Harald and Dagmar Alexander would become members of the so-called Lorber Society, an esoteric Gnostic-Christian sect led at the time by George Riehle. Harald interpreted Lorber's prophecies and visions as meaning that he was the "chosen one" and that his future son would be the "prophet" or "messiah" who would save humanity.

In 1954, Frank was born, his first son and the youngest of the family. From an early age, all members of the family paid homage to him and honored him as God. Before the age of 16, Frank began to physically and sexually abuse his mother and three sisters. These incestuous relationships were supported by his father, in an attempt to avoid having intimate or emotional relationships with people outside the family nucleus. When the incident became public, the family (with funds Dagmar had inherited from her father) left Germany and moved to Tenerife, in the Canary Islands.

== Event ==
The family settled at number 37, Jesús de Nazareno Street, in the island's capital, Santa Cruz de Tenerife. On the afternoon of December 16, 1970, one of the twin sisters, Sabine, was sent to San Cristóbal de La Laguna to work at the office of Dr. Walter Trenkel, a German doctor based in the Canary Islands. This fact allowed her to be the only survivor of the massacre.

That same afternoon, according to the testimony given by father and son, Frank (16 years old) believed he felt a sign and stated that his mother "had a demonic look, cold as ice and a sarcastic smile on her lips". That supposed look triggered the subsequent murder. Grabbing a wooden hanger from the closet, Frank began to hit his mother Dagmar (41 years old) on the head, until she became unconscious. Dagmar did not resist. Harald (39 years old), meanwhile, played the harmonium and accordion and recited some psalms while his son murdered his mother. Then they began to mutilate and dissect the body: they removed her breasts and genitals, which were hung on the wall.

Then they entered the next room, where Marina (17 years old) and Petra (15), Sabine's twin sister, were. Frank Alexander stated that his sisters were also possessed by the devil and proceeded to "free them from the evil one.” Like the mother, the two daughters did not protect themselves from the blows and were subsequently mutilated. After the massacre, Frank and Harald showered and prepared to flee back to Germany; however, not having their passports (they were destroyed in the violence), the two spent a night in the south of the island before returning to find the surviving daughter, Sabine, and confessing to the triple murder. Upon hearing the news, Sabine reacted by hugging her father and brother. Dr. Trenkler, who was present when Harald and Frank confessed to the crimes, immediately called the police. Two days after the massacre, on 18 December, the police showed up at the Alexander home.

== Trial ==
In March 1972, the trial against Harald and Frank began before the Provincial Court of Santa Cruz de Tenerife. The defense requested that father and son be placed in a mental asylum, and the prosecutor requested the death penalty for Harald (the death penalty in Spain was not abolished until 1978) and for Frank demanded 40 years in prison. During the trial, Frank showed a defiant attitude towards the members of the jury and seemed to be "out of his mind". Specialists and experts indicated that Harald had a "chronic delusional mental illness with a schizophrenic basis". The press dubbed the case "the crime of the century". Ultimately, the court ruled that they were not responsible, since the murders were carried out in full "mental alienation". Both were admitted to a psychiatric hospital in Carabanchel, in the Community of Madrid, from which they managed to escape at the beginning of the 1990s. A search warrant was sent to Interpol in 1995, although to this day the whereabouts of Frank and Harald Alexander are unknown. Similarly, the case was later found guilty of a crime. The whereabouts of Sabine, the only survivor, who was believed to have returned to Germany and begin working as a nun in a convent, are unknown.
