= Navas del Madroño =

- Coat of arms

- Location in Spain
- Coordinates: 39°37′N 6°39′W
- Country: Spain
- Autonomous community: Extremadura
- Province: Cáceres
- Municipality: Navas del Madroño

Area
  - Total: 112 km^{2} (43 sq mi)
- Elevation: 428 m (1,404 ft)

Population (2025-01-01)
  - Total: 1,254
  - Density: 11.2/km^{2} (29.0/sq mi)
- Time zone: UTC+1 (CET)
  - Summer (DST): UTC+2 (CEST)

Navas del Madroño is a municipality located in the province of Cáceres, Extremadura, Spain. According to the 2014 census, the municipality has a population of 1377 inhabitants.

== See also ==
- List of municipalities in Cáceres
