= 2010 Olot shooting =

Mass murder in Spain

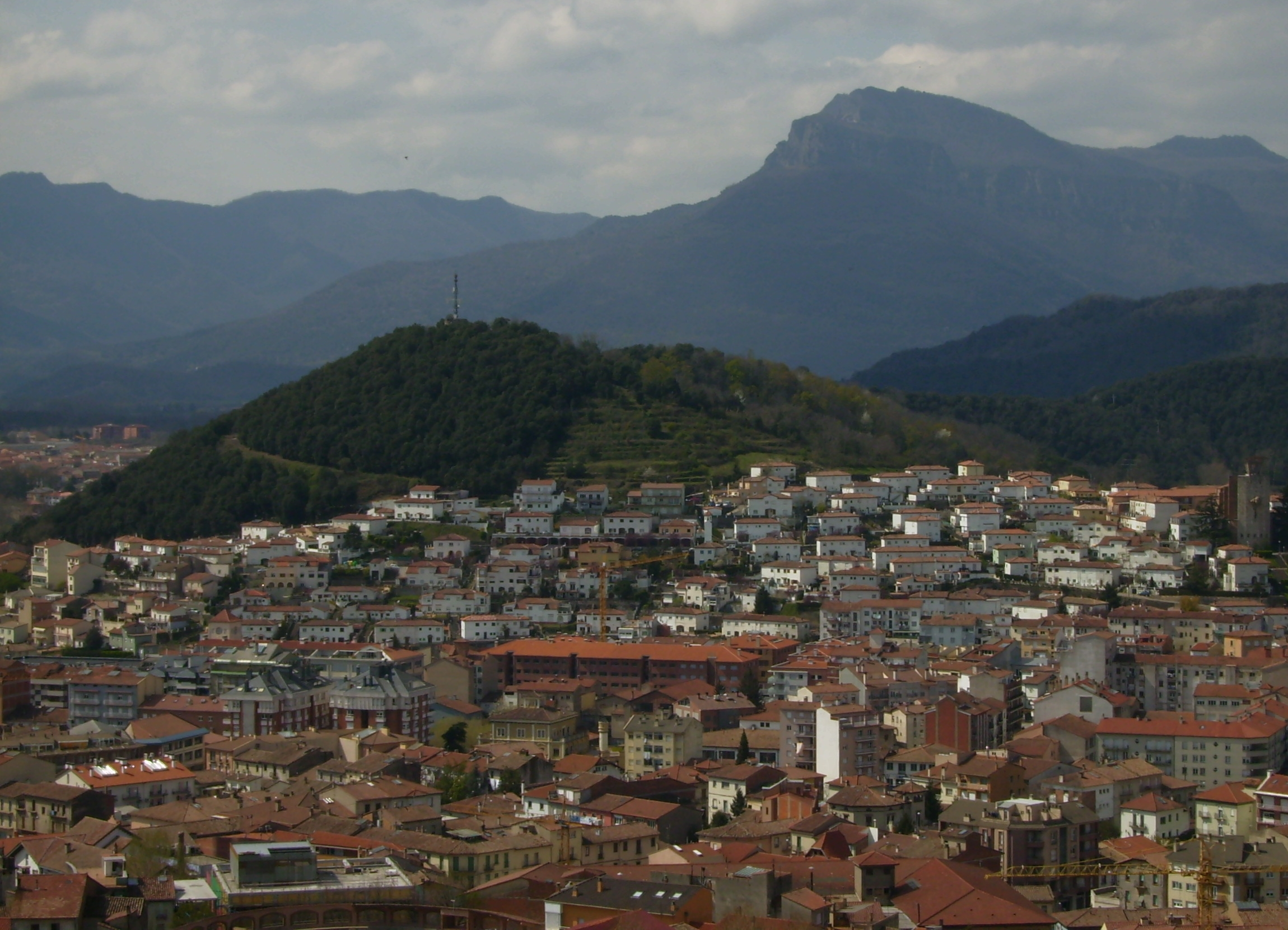
- Location: Olot, Spain
- Date: December 15, 2010
- Attack type: Mass murder; Mass shooting; Mass stabbing; Spree killer
- Weapon: Hunting weapon
- Deaths: 4
- Perpetrator: Pere Puig Puntí

The 2010 Olot shooting, or the 2010 Olot massacre, was a multiple murder that occurred on the morning of December 15, 2010, in the town of Olot, located in the province of Girona, Catalonia, Spain. Four people died. The gunman first shot two construction businessmen in a bar and then, after driving, killed two bank employees at a nearby branch. All died instantly. Initially, it was said that the crime had a financial motive, although this was later denied by the police.

== Background ==
Pere Puig Puntí, a single man who lived with his octogenarian father and was a bricklayer by trade (in fact, he was the murdered men's "trusted laborer" for over 20 years), was 57 years old when, due to the severe economic crisis the country was experiencing, he was informed that he was going to be laid off because the company could no longer afford his salary (in fact, they already owed him several months' pay). Apparently, they even gave him a check for severance pay, which bounced. A keen hunter (especially of wild boar), he had legally owned a big-game hunting rifle since 1993. The weapon used, a .338 Winchester Magnum caliber big-game hunting rifle, can kill a person at a distance of 800 meters. He had successfully passed the required psychological tests (the last one in 2010). He attracted the attention of the neighbors because of his peculiarities; in fact, many days, after work, he would dress up as a sheriff and walk through the town's streets with a hat, a toy gun, and a star on his chest. and was generally considered "strange and solitary."

== The Shooting ==
The killer, who had planned the massacre for days, followed the plan without hesitation and selected his victims. On December 14, 2010, around 8:30 a.m., he went to a bar and, after exchanging a few words with another local resident—"It's cold, isn't it?" the resident remarked, to which Pere replied, "I'll warm up soon"—he burst into the bar La Cuina de l'Anna (in La Caña) at 9:10 a.m., where Joan Tubert, 62, and Àngel Tubert, 35, father and son, owners of the company Construccions Tubert S.L., were having breakfast. The shooter had been employed by the company until his dismissal. Without saying a word, he shot first the father and then the son, killing them instantly. He aimed for the heart, and Joan died on the spot. The businessman's son was only able to take two steps after being shot. The bullet pierced his chest, exited through his back, and lodged fifteen centimeters into the bar wall (http://www.canalsur.es/portal_rtva/web/noticia?id=131789). There were nine other customers in the bar, but Puig only found two of the people he intended to kill. It was later revealed that the bricklayer had another employee of the company and a fourth person close to the bar owners on his list, but they were not present at the time.

After leaving the restaurant, the killer got into his blue Suzuki SUV and sped the short distance to a branch of Caja del Mediterráneo (CAM), where three bank employees were present, but no customers. He arrived around 9:21 a.m. and, armed with the same rifle, fatally shot two employees—Anna Pujol, 56, and Rafael Turró, 46—who died instantly. Emergency services were unable to save them. The third employee, who was in an office at the time, escaped unharmed. She had apparently gone there because she had debts with the bank and was facing eviction.

== Arrest ==
Puig surrendered to a local police patrol just as he was leaving the bank. He was still armed with the rifle, although it was pointed at the ground. The police patrol saw his car double-parked in front of the CAM bank and, when they issued him a ticket, Puig appeared and surrendered without resistance after stating that "I had just killed four people" and "I am now satisfied," he told them before surrendering. At the moment of surrender, although his rifle was pointed at the ground, one of the officers drew his service weapon and a shot was accidentally discharged. Fortunately, the bullet lodged in the facade of a funeral home, causing no injuries. Finally, the officers arrested him without resistance very near the La Caritat nursing home, where weeks earlier the orderly Joan Vila Dilmé had been arrested, suspected of killing 11 elderly residents over the course of a year by forcing them to ingest bleach and other toxic products.

== Aftermath ==
The Olot City Council, in an extraordinary plenary session, decreed three days of mourning in memory of the victims, while the mayor, Lluís Sacrest, described the massacre as "brutal and inexplicable" and lamented that "this world we have all created creates situations of imbalance in people's minds that make us a very fragile society."

This quadruple murder has established Olot as the crime capital of Catalonia, as this small town, having already endured the historic kidnapping of pharmacist Maria Angels Feliu, who was held captive for 492 days in the mid-nineties, discovered just weeks before this massacre that Joan Vila Dilmé, an orderly at a local nursing home, was a serial killer after murdering at least eleven elderly people, whom he poisoned while they were defenseless.

On June 26, 2018, Pere Puig Puntí died from cancer in the prison hospital of Terrassa (Barcelona Province), where he was serving his sentence. Before his death, he wrote a letter to the families where he apologized and showed genuine remorse for the crimes.
