= Bombing of Jaén =

- Part of the Spanish Civil War
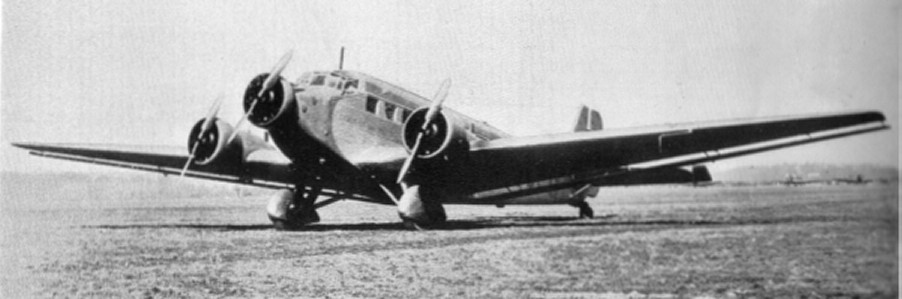
- Junkers Ju 52 3M aircraft
- Location: Jaén, Andalusia, Spain; 37°46′0″N 3°46′16″W
- Date: 1 April 1937
- Executed by: Nationalist Air Force
- Casualties: 159 killed
- Location of Jaén within Andalusia Location of Jaén within Spain Location of Jaén within Europe

The bombing of Jaén was an aerial attack on the city of Jaén on 1 April 1937, during the Spanish Civil War, by the Condor Legion of Nazi Germany, who fought for the rebels. The bombing was ordered by the General Queipo de Llano, as retaliation for a Republican air raid on the city of Córdoba.

== Bombing ==
On 1 April 1937, six German Ju 52 bombers of the Nationalist Air Force, escorted by six Heinkel He 51 and three CR 32 fighters, bombed the city of Jaén. Current estimates indicated there were 159 deaths among the civilian population and several hundred injured, comparable with the bombing of Guernica, which occurred four weeks later.

== Aftermath ==
As a reprisal, the local republican authorities executed 128 Nationalist prisoners.

== See also ==
- Condor Legion
- Spanish Civil War
