= Pedro Montoliú =

Spanish journalist

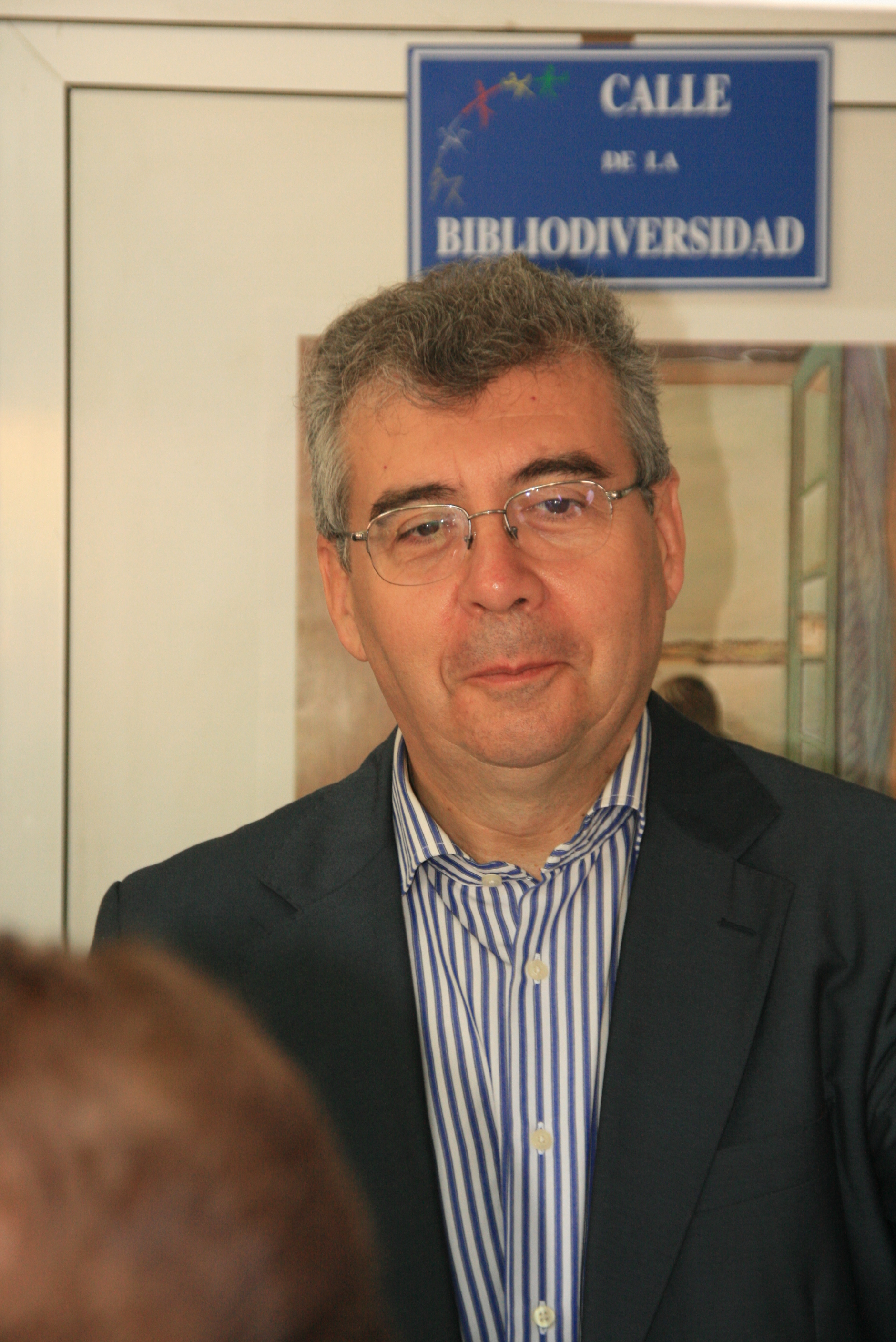
- Pedro Montoliú at the 2010 Madrid Book Fair
- Born: Pedro Montoliú Camps; 1954 (age 71–72); Madrid, Spain
- Education: Complutense University of Madrid
- Occupation: Journalist

Pedro Montoliú Camps (born 1954) is a Spanish journalist who was named a Chronicler of the Villa de Madrid in 1999.

== Biography ==
Pedro Montoliú was born in Madrid in 1954. In 1974, he began writing for numerous publications, such as Triunfo, Posible, Realidades, and Informaciones. He earned a licentiate in journalism at the Complutense University of Madrid's Faculty of Information Sciences in 1976. That year he became a founding editor of El País, a newspaper where he worked for fifteen years as a municipal chronicler and deputy local news chief.

After directing the magazine La Esfera, the Ministry of Territorial Policy of the Community of Madrid's Department of Communication, and his own communication company, Montoliú was put in charge of the Madrid local supplement for the newspaper La Vanguardia. In 2001, he founded and began directing Madridiario, the first digital portal dedicated to Madrid news, a position he currently holds.

A lecturer, commentator on local issues for various stations, and columnist for publications including ABC and La Vanguardia, Montoliú has received the Mesonero Romanos Journalism Award from the City Council of Madrid (1985) and the Chamber of Commerce and Industry Award of Madrid (1988). He has been a juror for the Antonio Maura Research Award and the Mesonero Romanos Award, convened by the Madrid City Council, and the Río Manzanares Novel Award, convened by the Municipal Land and Housing Company. He also chairs the jury of the Madrid Awards granted by Madridiario.

In 1999, the Plenary Session of the City Council of Madrid appointed him Chronicler of the Villa de Madrid. In 2004 he was elected a permanent member of the Madrid Studies Institute, and in 2009 he received the Francos Rodríguez Award from the Madrid Press Association for his professional career dedicated to the city.

Montoliú has combined his professional work with the study of the history of Madrid. He co-authored the book Palace Hotel, Madrid (with two editions, in 1999 and 2009), and was coordinator of the Madrid Fair Institution's Best of Madrid guide for the years 1996, 1997, and 1998. In 2002, he published his first novel, La memoria de cristal.

== Awards ==
- 1985: Mesonero Romanos Journalism Award from the City Council of Madrid
- 1988: Chamber of Commerce and Industry Award of Madrid
- 2009: Francos Rodríguez Award from the Madrid Press Association

== Works ==
- Once siglos de mercado madrileño (1985), ISBN 9788450520361, in three editions, with prologues by mayors Enrique Tierno Galván, Juan Barranco Gallardo, and Agustín Rodríguez Sahagún
- Madrid Villa y Corte (1987), ISBN 9788477370024, work comprising three volumes, with prologue by Julio Caro Baroja
  - Madrid, Villa y Corte. Historia de una ciudad (1996), ISBN 9788477370574, revised and expanded edition of Volume 1
  - Madrid, Villa y Corte. Calles y plazas (2002), ISBN 9788477371120, revised and expanded edition of Volume 2
- El ayer, hoy y mañana de las ferias de Madrid (1990), ISBN 9788440460776
- Fiestas y tradiciones madrileñas (1990), ISBN 9788477370284, with prologue by Francisco Nieva
- Once siglos de mercado madrileño: de la plaza de la Paja a Mercamadrid (1991), ISBN 9788477370321
- Madrid 1900 (1994), ISBN 9788477375036, prologue by José Luis López Aranguren
- Madrid en la Guerra Civil. Vol. 1, La historia (1998), ISBN 9788477370727
- Madrid en la guerra civil. Los protagonistas (1999), ISBN 9788477370734
- Palace Hotel, Madrid (1999), ISBN 9788477826675
- Enciclopedia de Madrid (2002), ISBN 9788408043386
- La memoria de cristal (2002), ISBN 9788484332336
- Madrid en la posguerra. 1939–1946. Los años de la represión (2005), ISBN 9788477371595
- Madrid bajo la dictadura 1947–1959 (2010), ISBN 9788477374169
- Héroes, pícaros y soñadores : la historia de Madrid para los más jóvenes (2015), ISBN 9788477376286
- De la dictadura a la democracia : protagonistas (2018), ISBN 9788477379379
