= José María Albiñana =

Spanish physician, neurologist, medical writer, philosopher and politician

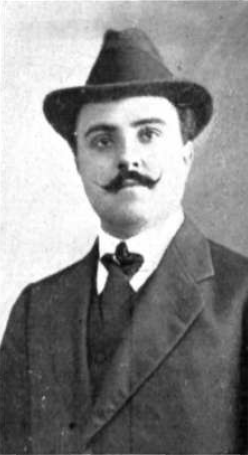
Photograph of José María Albiñana published in Mundo Gráfico, number 5 of 29 noviembre 1911

José María Albiñana (13 October 1883 – 23 August 1936) was a Spanish physician, eugenicist, neurologist, medical writer, philosopher and anti-republican right-wing politician.

Born in Enguera, Valencia, he was a Doctor of Medicine specialising in mental health. He was also a doctor in law and philosophy and with Manuel Delgado Barreto founded the Partido Nacionalista Español.

== Medicine ==
Albiñana was an academic of the Real Academia Nacional de Medicina of Spain to which he had been elected for his work in medical philosophy Concepto actual de la Filosofía médica y su valor en el desarrollo de la Medicina.

Albiñana founded the newspaper La Sanidad Civil in order to vindicate the rights of medical professionals, and was funded by the state. In 1920 he was elected to the chair of History of Medicine at the University of Alcalá but without success and later distanced himself from university life. From his early 20s he began publishing medical literature and philosophy. His notable works of his first 20 years in the profession are shown below in his published works. Albiñana later became a supporter of eugenics.

== Mexico ==
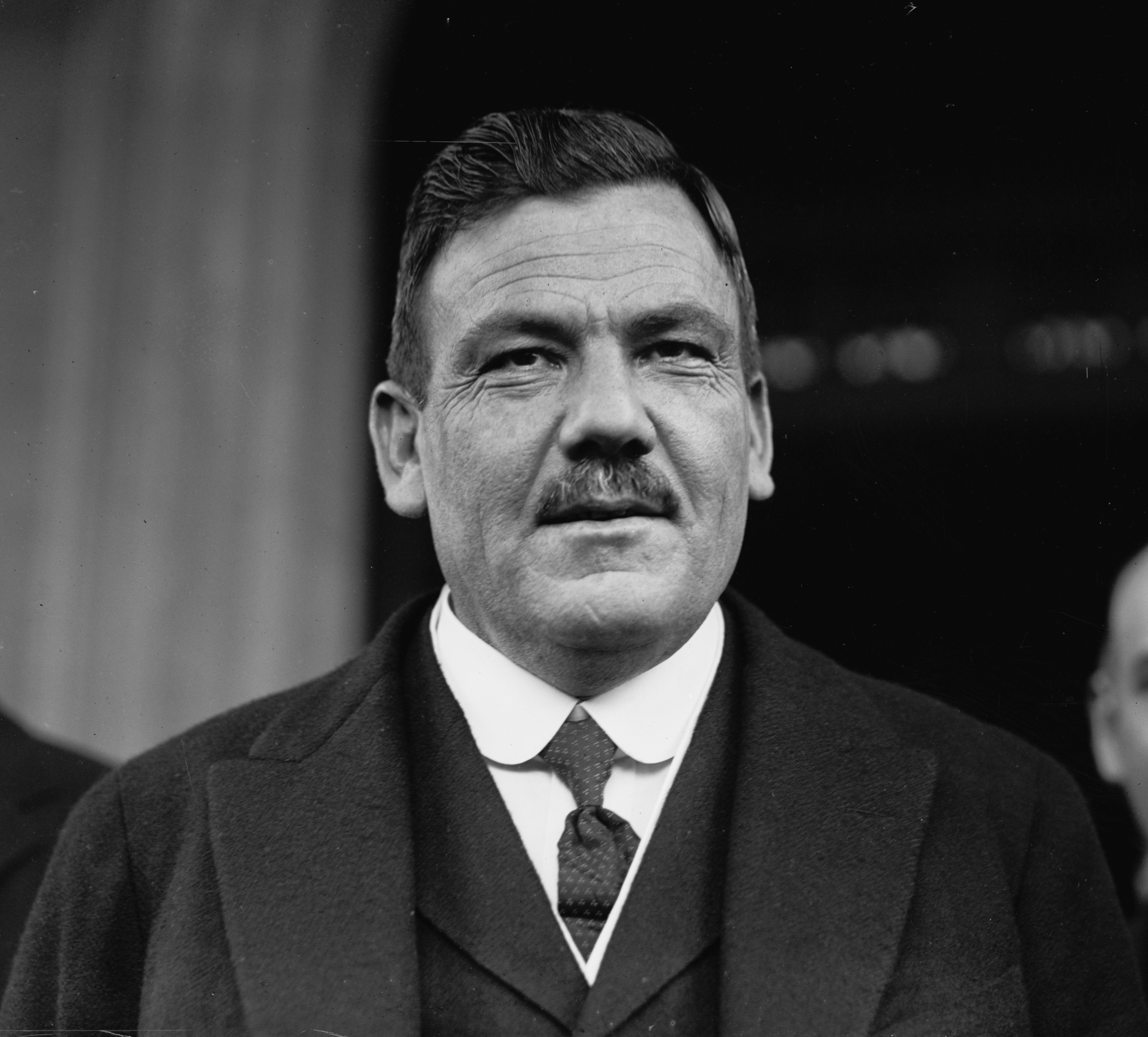
Albiñana was expelled from Mexico during the Plutarco Elías Calles (pictured) regime

In the 1920s, Albiñana continued his activity in Mexico, in the Mexican capital, where he established his own clinic. He became acquainted with the Hispanic-American way of life and attended many conferences, publishing a multitude of new works and three autobiographical novels: Sol de Levante (Gerardo Sisniega, México, 1923), Aventuras Tropicales. En busca del oro verde (Madrid, 1928) and Bajo el cielo mejicano (Cía. Ibero-Americana de Publicaciones Madrid, 1930).

Albiñana's time in Mexico was marred by political unrest and violence. Madero had been assassinated in 1913, Emiliano Zapata in 1919, Pancho Villa in 1923 and Carranza in 1920. Farmer revolts, coup d'etats and crime became the political norm. Obregón was assassinated in 1928 and the Cristero War broke out with the Cristeros presuming to represent the aspirations of the Mexican Catholics. Such was the mistrust of foreigners during this period, that Albiñana was later expelled from the country under Plutarco Elías Calles.

== Burgos delegate ==
Albiñana returned to Spain in Burgos where he was later elected as its delegate in 1934, and reelected in 1936, although by this time his Valencian accent had become mixed with a Mexican accent causing some suspicion. Over time he gained the trust of the people in Burgos, catering to the needs of the neighbourhoods and readily answering questions. He brought about a number of infrastructural developments in Burgos including the legal work for the Compañía de Aguas de Burgos (Burgos Water Company), installation of the telephone in Villarcayo and Medina de Pomar, and the installation and creation of Burgos Airport, securing important subsidies and investors to develop the region.

== Assassination and tribute ==
Albiñana was murdered along with other prominent politicians by militia men during the Cárcel Modelo massacre. With the triumph of the Nationalist faction, streets in several localities, mainly in his native Valencia, were dedicated to him.

== Published works ==
- La medicina en verso. Colección de humoradas médico-literarias, (1904)
- Fraternidad y cultura. Medios que pueden ponerse en práctica por el Estado, corporaciones o particulares para auxiliar a los estudiantes que no dispongan de medios de fortuna (Valencia, 1905)
- La medicación catodilítico-fosfatada en el tratamiento de la neurastenia Congreso de la Asociación Española para el progreso de la Ciencia (Zaragoza, 1908)
- Orientación de la juventud ante el problema religioso (Valencia, 1910)
- Los crímenes del caciquismo: la tragedia de El Pobo. Defensa del médico don Alfredo Alegre. Informe presentado en el jucio oral ... (Madrid, 1918)
- La ignorancia de las Academias (Madrid, 1918)
- Cooperación española a la formación de la Escuela Médica de Montellier Primer Congreso Internacional de la Historia de la Medicina ( Amberes, 1920)
- Desarrollo de las Comunidades Espirituales (192?)
- Programa para un curso de Historia Crítica de la Medicina (1921)
- La situación de México vista desde España Ateneo de Madrid (Madrid, 1921)
- Sol de Levante (Gerardo Sisniega, México, 1923)
- Aventuras Tropicales. En busca del oro verde (Madrid, 1928)
- Bajo el cielo mejicano (Cía. Ibero-Americana de Publicaciones Madrid, 1930)

== Bibliography ==
- Luis Palacios Bañuelos, Elecciones en Burgos 1931-1936. El Partido Nacionalista Español, Publicaciones de la Cátedra de Historia Contemporánea de España. Universidad Complutense, Madrid, 1981. ISBN 84-300-3447-1
- Julio Gil Pecharromán, Sobre España inmortal, solo Dios, José María Albiñana y el Partido Nacionalista Español (1930-1937). Universidad Nacional de Educación a Distancia, Madrid, 2002. ISBN 84-362-4240-8
- Asvero Gravelli, ''Verso L'Internazionale Fascista", Roma 1.932
- María Concepción Marcos del Olmo, La Segunda República en Burgos, en Historia de Burgos, Diario16 de Burgos, 1993. ISBN 84-604-6088-6
- Luis Palacios Bañuelos, La Segunda República en Burgos, En Historia de Burgos, tomo IV, Caja de Burgos, Burgos, 2002. ISBN 84-87152-75-9
- Arnaud Imatz, José Antonio, entre el odio y el amor. Su historia como fue. Madrid, Áltera, 2006. ISBN 978-84-89779-90-7
