= Association for the Recovery of Historical Memory =

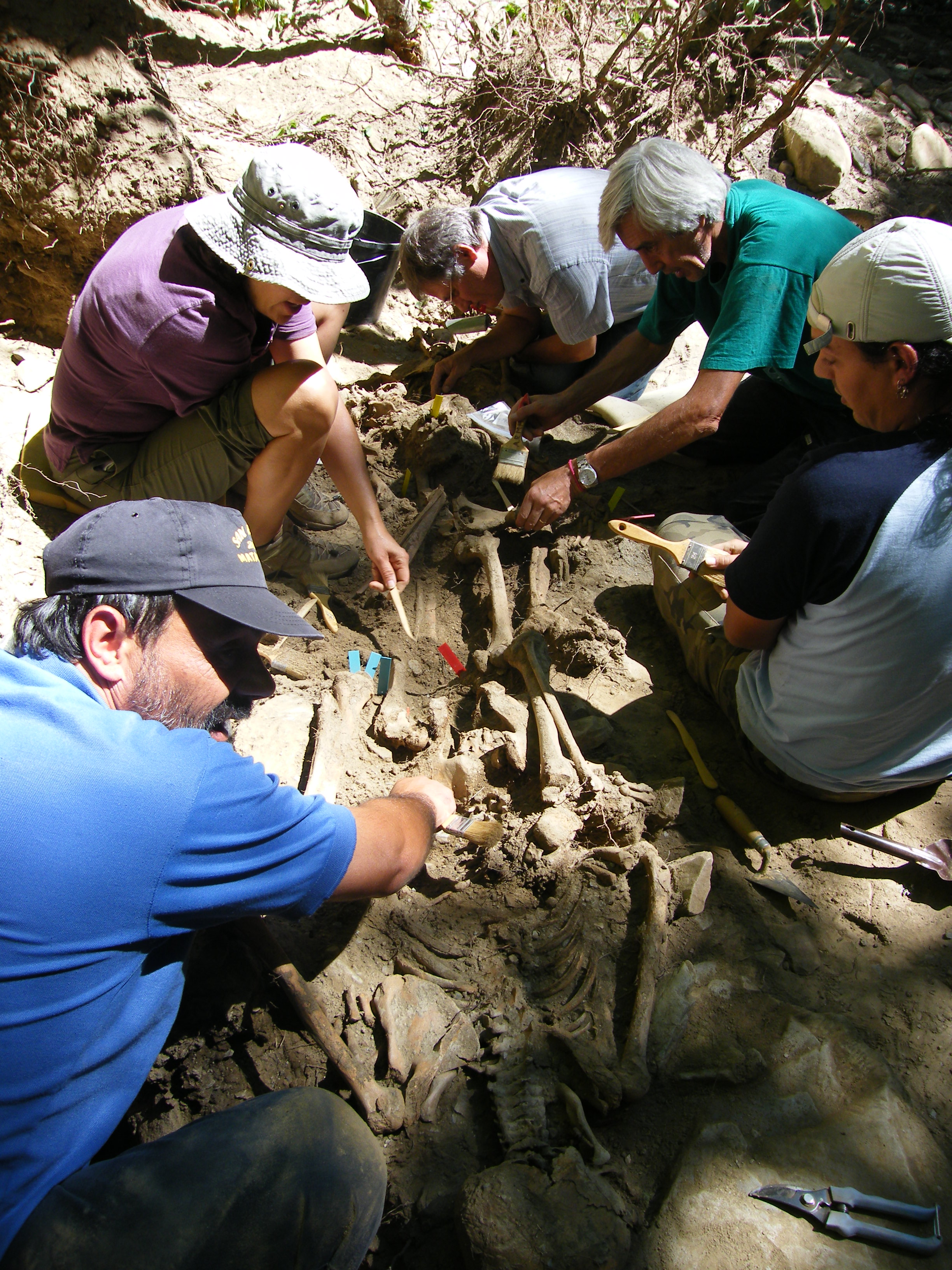
Excavation of a mass grave in the province of León by ARMH

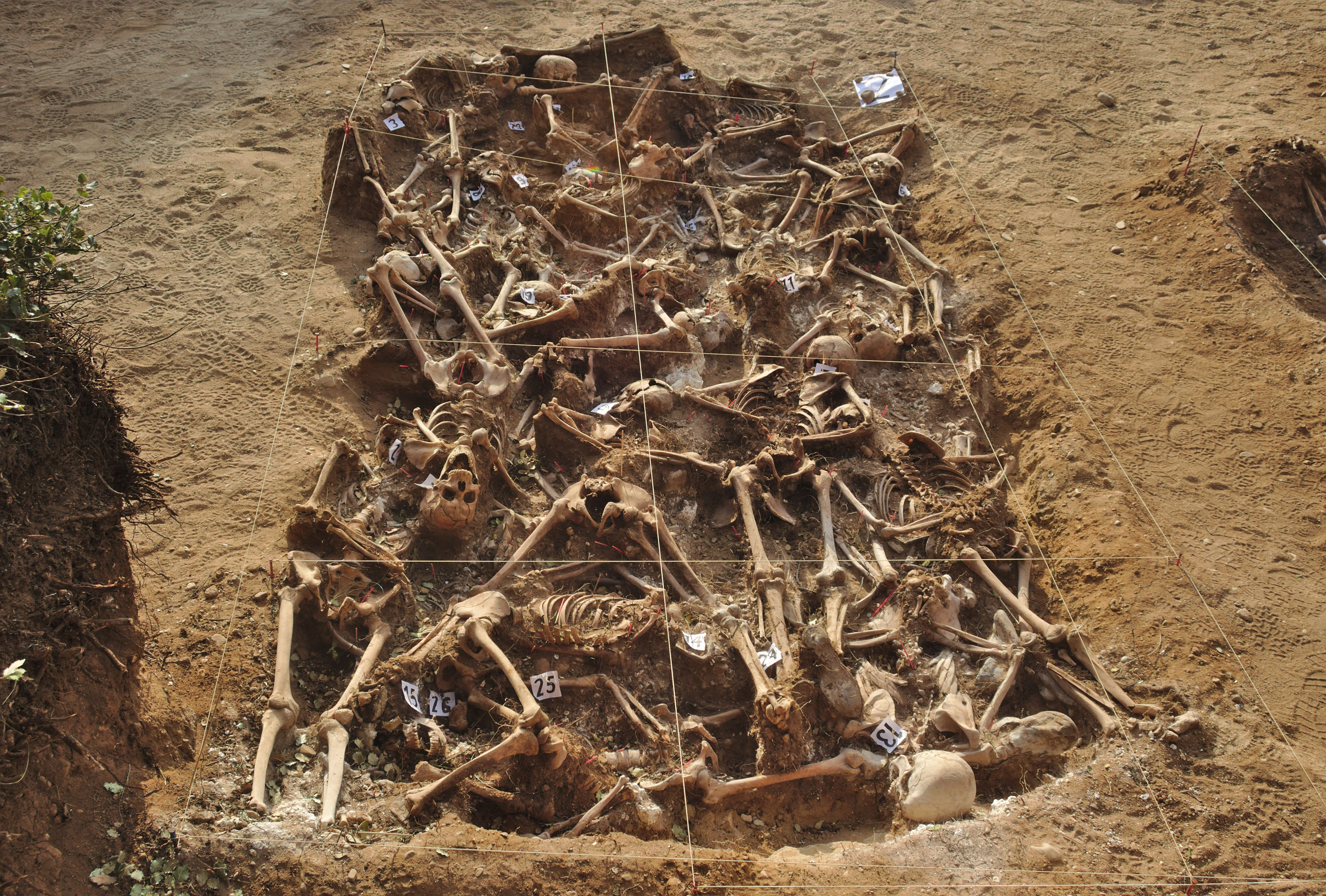
Mass grave excavated at Estépar in the province of Burgos.

The Association for the Recovery of Historical Memory (Spanish: Asociación para la Recuperación de la Memoria Histórica, ARMH) is a Spanish organization that collects the oral and written testimonies about the White Terror of Francisco Franco and excavates and identifies bodies of victims, who were often dumped in mass graves.

Emilio Silva and Santiago Macias founded the ARMH in December 2000. It is a group of about 50 Spanish archaeologists, anthropologists and forensic scientists. The group tries to identify the places of execution through records and interviewing the locals. Sometimes they also receive anonymous information about them. Volunteer group members gather in a decided place to excavate the mass grave found. They try to exhume the bodies and identify the remains of the victims with DNA tests and other forensic methods.

As of September 2006, ARMH had conducted 40 excavations and found remains of 520 victims. As of October 2009 the group had identified the remains of 1,700 victims.

== Media interest ==
The excavation of one of the mass graves in 2004 at Villamayor de los Montes near Burgos was the subject of a photo-documentary entitled Dark is the Room Where We Sleep at the International Center Of Photography in New York, New York.

== Political context ==
Opening mass graves has been politically controversial. In 2007 the work of the Association was given state support by the Historical Memory Law, an initiative of the Zapatero administration. However, the Spanish government under Mariano Rajoy (2011–2018) was less cooperative and, for example, refused to open historical archives that would allow experts and historians to throw light on the fate of victims of the Francoist State. In 2020, El Pais reported that the Second government of Pedro Sánchez was working on the draft of a new law that would include a DNA database and an official list of Civil War victims. This legislation came into effect in 2022 as the Democratic Memory Law.

== See also ==
- Red Terror (Spain)
- General Archive of the Spanish Civil War
- Law of Historical Memory
