= Málaga–Almería road massacre =

1937 Nationalist attack in the Spanish Civil War

- Part of the White Terror during the Spanish Civil War
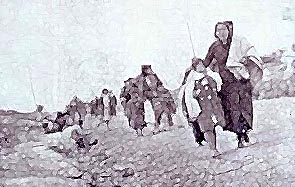
- A group of refugees during the Desbandá.
- Location: N-340 road from Málaga to Almería
- Date: 8 February 1937
- Target: Civilian refugees
- Attack type: Massacre
- Deaths: up to 5,000
- Perpetrator: Nationalist faction

The Málaga–Almería road massacre, also known as the Desbandá, was an attack on people fleeing on foot from Málaga after the largely Republican city was captured by Nationalist and fascist armies on 8 February 1937, during the Spanish Civil War. The estimated 5,000–15,000 civilians who attempted to evacuate the besieged city via the N-340 coastal Málaga–Almería road were subjected to bombing from the air and sea, resulting in a significant number of deaths.

== Background ==
On 12 April 1931, Spain had its first democratic elections since the dictatorship of Miguel Primo de Rivera. The elections resulted in the formation of the Spanish Second Republic. Consequently, a great divide was created among two of the more prevalent political ideologies of the time.

El golpe de estado was a coup d’etat on 18 July 1936 by the Nationalist forces against the Republican government. As a result of the failure of the coup, the Spanish Civil War began immediately afterwards.

Aside from the capital city of Sevilla, the southern region of Andalucía (Andalusia) was primarily a Republican stronghold during the war. Málaga, a Republican city on the southern coast of Andalucia, was soon targeted by the Nationalist forces. On 17 January 1937, Nationalist forces led by General Gonzalo Queipo de Llano were sent to seize Granada, Marbella, Ronda and other surrounding areas. These actions were not perceived by Republican authorities to require immediate retaliation or preparation. However, the Nationalist force greatly outnumbered the army in Málaga. The Nationalist forces consisted of Spanish soldiers, approximately 10,000 Italian Blackshirts, German supporters, and even troops from the cities of Ceuta, Melilla, the Canary Islands and the Balearic Islands. Meanwhile, only 12,000 Republican troops were prepared to defend Málaga with 8,000 guns.

== Attack on Málaga ==
On 3 February 1937, the Nationalist forces were met by Republican opposition in Ronda as they neared the city of Málaga. However, the defensive efforts were squashed. The city of Málaga was soon besieged by Nationalist forces. Italian Corpo Truppe Volontarie units attacked the city from the surrounding highlands on 6 February, forcing the evacuation of civilians from the city. 8 February 1937 marked the fall of Málaga to Nationalist forces. The city was attacked by land, air, and sea. Troops infiltrated Málaga with guns and tanks, while Italian and German aerial and marine forces bombed and burned the city.

Due to its geographical location along the northern coast of the Mediterranean Sea and its mountainous, inland boundaries (the Sierra Morena and the Baetic System) the city of Málaga was limited in means of transport and evacuation. As a result, thousands of citizens in Málaga were left defenceless and unprepared for the attacks at the hands of the Nationalist forces.

== Flight and massacre ==
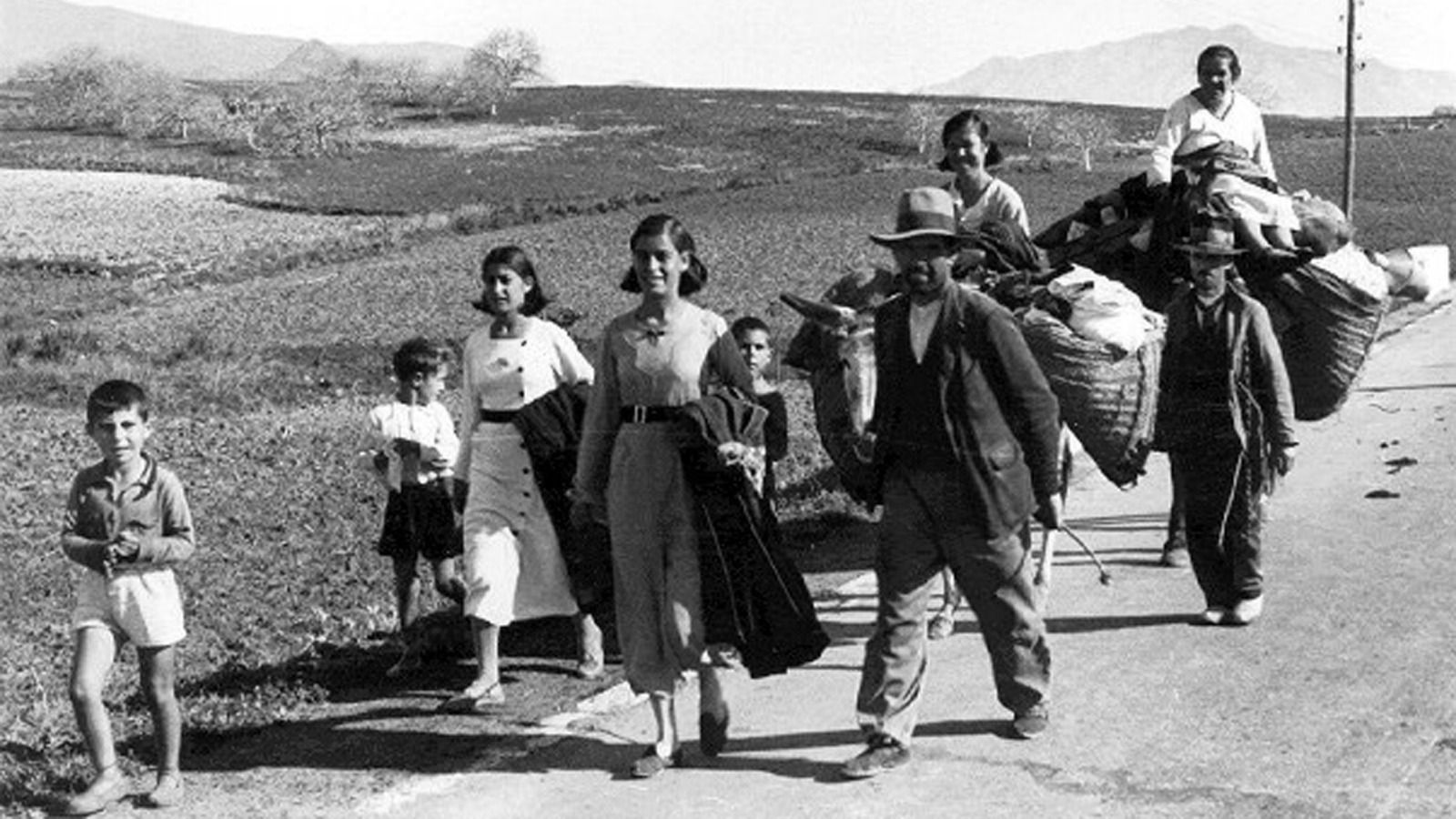
Refugees walking on the road from Málaga to Almería, ca. 10 February 1937

An estimated 15,000–50,000 civilians, chiefly the elderly, women, and children, fled towards the city of Almería, nearly 125 miles (201 km) to the east via the main coastal highway, the N-340 road (la carretera N-340). Three Nationalist cruisers — the heavy cruisers Baleares and Canarias and the light cruiser Almirante Cervera — bombarded the road. The frantic civilians traveling unprotected along the highway were slaughtered. The Republican Air Force was unable to halt the attacks. Mothers carrying children were slaughtered, leaving many children along the way. The elderly, the injured, and those physically, emotionally, and spiritually incapable of completing the trek were swiftly eradicated. Estimates of the number of deaths vary; whilst a figure of approximately 3000 people had historically been used, historians (including those whose research the original figure had been based on, such as Antonio Nadal) have subsequently indicated that the true figure may have been significantly lower. Post-Franco statements by the Spanish government have generally not referred to specific numbers but have merely noted that "the exact number of dead and missing remains unknown".

Those who reached Almería were largely rejected by the city’s citizens out of fear of the encroaching Nationalist forces. Those who declined to evacuate Málaga (approximately 4,000 people) were systematically rounded-up, raped, killed, and piled into mass graves, such as the San Rafael Cemetery.

== Aftermath ==
Anita Carrillo, a captain in the Spanish Republican Army, and part of the evacuation attempt, was injured but survived the attack. She recounted her experiences in an article in March 1937 by Margarita Nelken for the magazine Estampa, which helped to record and publicise the atrocities.

Various accounts from the 1960s claim that corpses could still be found alongside the highway from the aerial and ground attacks.

== Memoriam ==
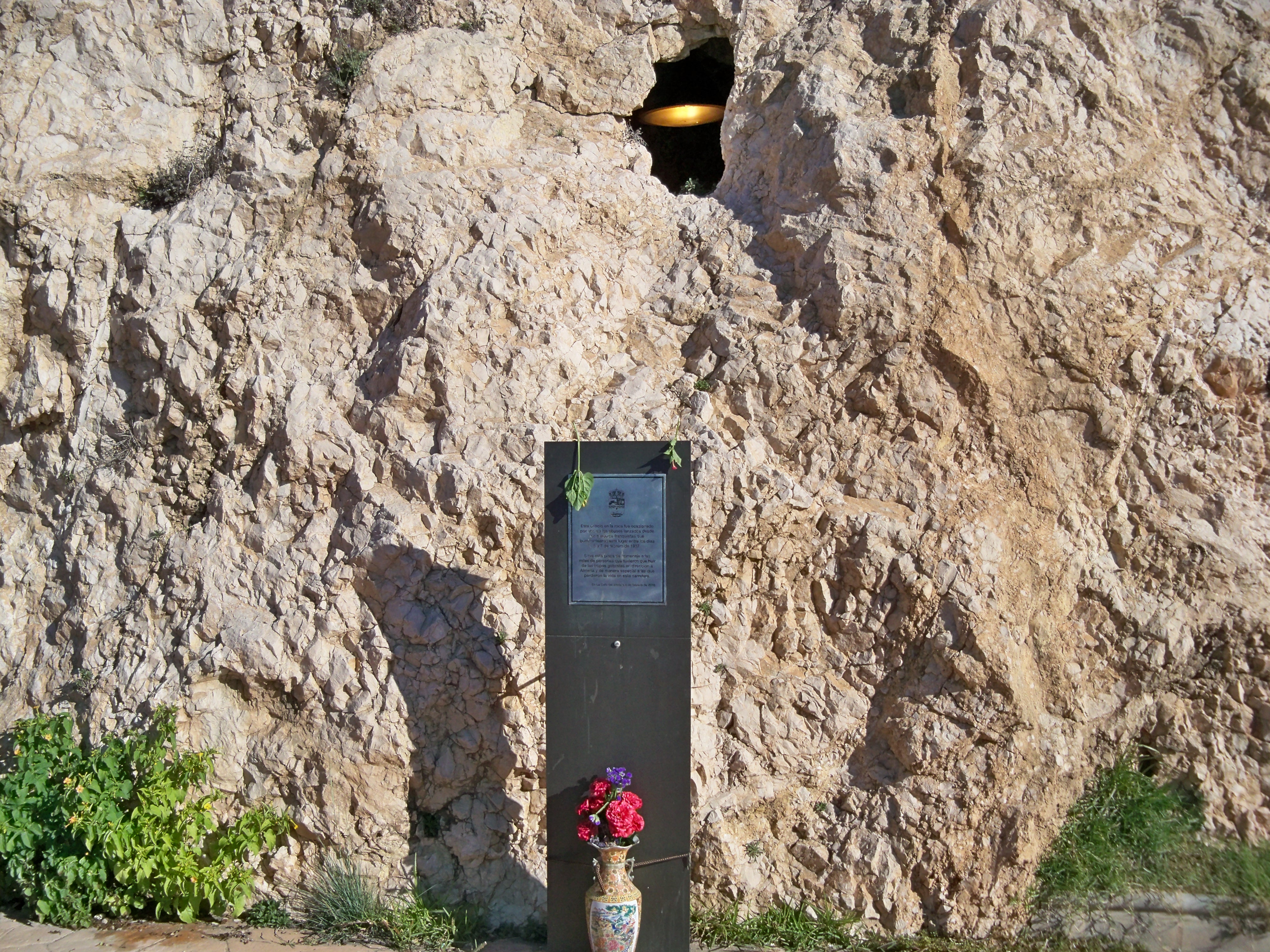
Memorial plaque near Rincón de la Victoria

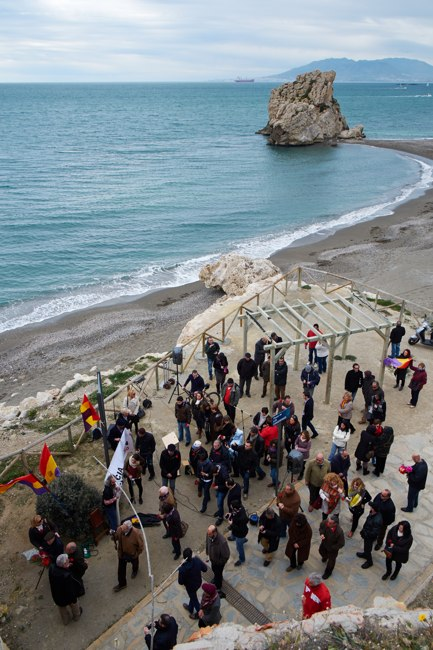
Homage to the victims at Peñón del Cuervo, 2015.

The Málaga–Almería road massacre serves as a dark reminder of the political, economic, social, and religious unrest that plagued Spain during the 20th century.

In 2005, a memorial service was initiated in Torre del Mar (approximately halfway between Málaga and Almería) to honor the victims of the massacre. Since then, it has become a tradition to create a memorial wreath for the victims every 7 February.

In 2016 the Asociación Sociocultural y Club Senderista la Desbandá (La Desbandá socio-cultural association and hiking club) started an annual march to commemorate the massacre.

In 2022 the nearby town of Benalmádena honoured the courage of Canadian surgeon and Communist activist Norman Bethune with new monument and renaming a roundabout.

== See also ==
- List of massacres in Spain
- Red Terror (Spain)
- White Terror (Spain)

== Bibliography ==
- Barranquero Texeira, Lucía Prieto Borrego (Eds.): La Desbandá, 1937. De Málaga a los Pirineos (Catálogo de la exposición). Madrid: Ministerio de la Presidencia. Secretaría General Técnica, 2022.
- Lucía Prieto Borrego: "El significado de Norman Bethune en la construcción de la Memoria Pública de la carretera Málaga-Almería, 1937", 2018, Historia del Presente.
- Jesús Majada: Carretera Málaga-Almeria (febrero 1937). Caligrama Ediciones.
- Jesús Majada: Norman Bethune. El crimen de la carretera Málaga-Almería. Caligrama Ediciones.
- Muñoz, Pedro M., y Marcelino C. Marcos. “La estructura del Estado y la vida política”. España: Ayer y Hoy. Upper Saddle River, NJ: Pearson/Prentice Hall, 2010. 204–223.
- Hernández, Javier. "El Blog De Los Kroquetas." Weblog post. El Blog De Los Kroquetas. N.p., 28 Jan. 2010. Web. 20 Oct. 2013.
- Geoff, Billett. "Geoffreybillett : Photography." Geoffrey Billett Documentary Photography. N.p., 24 Sept. 2011. Web. 20 Oct. 2013.
