= Ramón Álvarez-Valdés =

Spanish politician and lawyer (1866–1936)

Ramón Álvarez-Valdés (1866, Pola de Siero – 23 August 1936) was a Spanish politician and lawyer.

He was Minister of Justice of during the Second Spanish Republic between 16 December 1933 and 17 April 1934 under the presidency of Alejandro Lerroux. He was arrested after the military revolt of 18 July 1936 in the Spanish Civil War and jailed and was killed about a month later.
