= Estépar =

Coordinates: 42°16′N 3°54′W

- Municipality and town
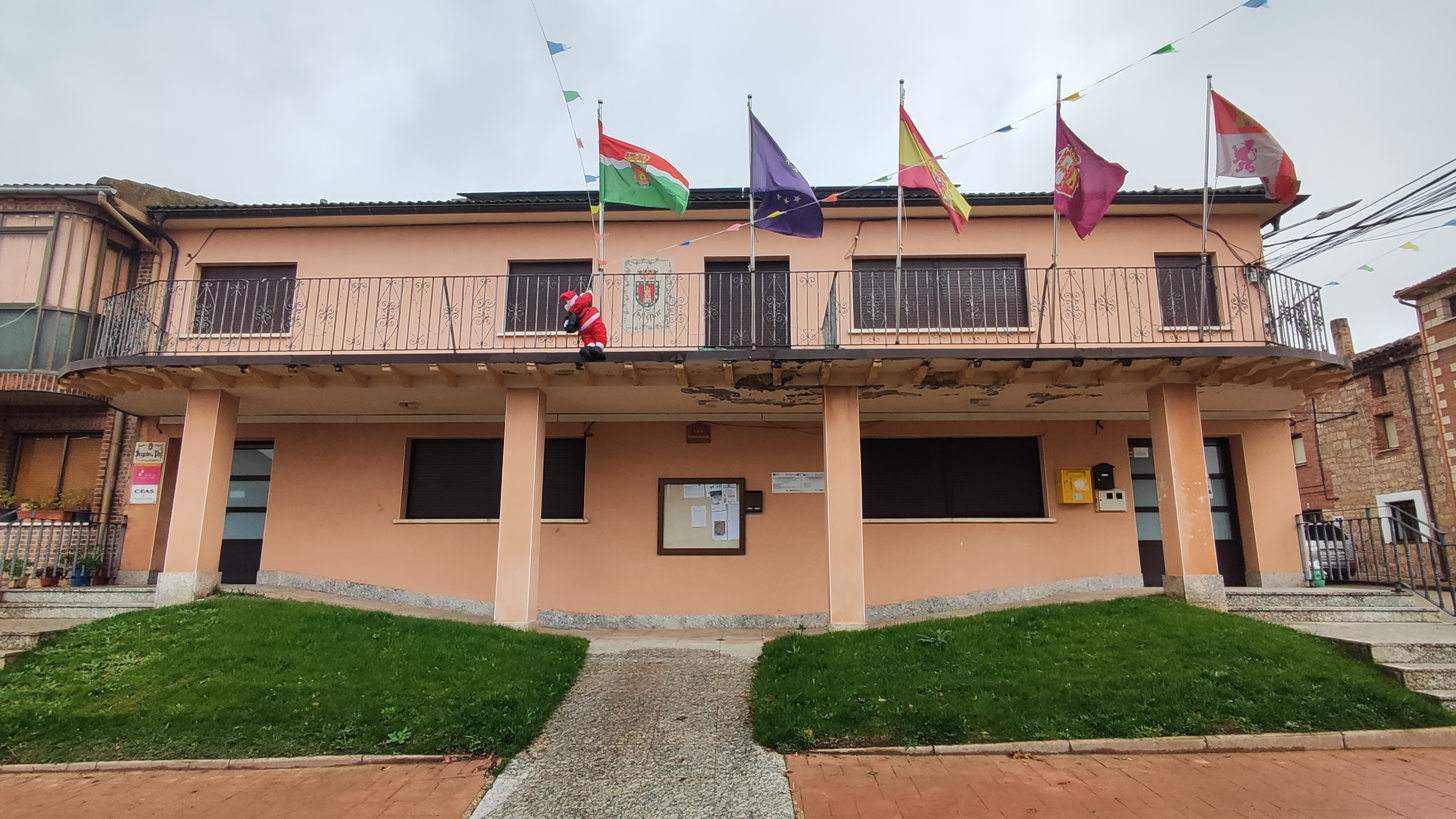
- Town hall

- Coat of arms
- Interactive map of Estépar
- Country: Spain
- Autonomous community: Castile and León
- Province: Burgos
- Comarca: Alfoz de Burgos

Area
  - Total: 102 km^{2} (39 sq mi)
- Elevation: 812 m (2,664 ft)

Population (2025-01-01)
  - Total: 646
  - Density: 6.33/km^{2} (16.4/sq mi)
- Time zone: UTC+1 (CET)
  - Summer (DST): UTC+2 (CEST)
- Postal code: 09230
- Website: https://www.estepar.es/

Estépar is a municipality located in the province of Burgos, Castile and León, Spain. According to the 2004 census (INE), the municipality had a population of 797 inhabitants.

== Mass graves ==
Estépar is the site of multiple mass graves, discovered by the Association for the Recovery of Historical Memory in 2014. Initial reports referred to the graves containing the remains of at least 70 republicans who were killed by nationalists in August–September 1936 during the Spanish Civil War.

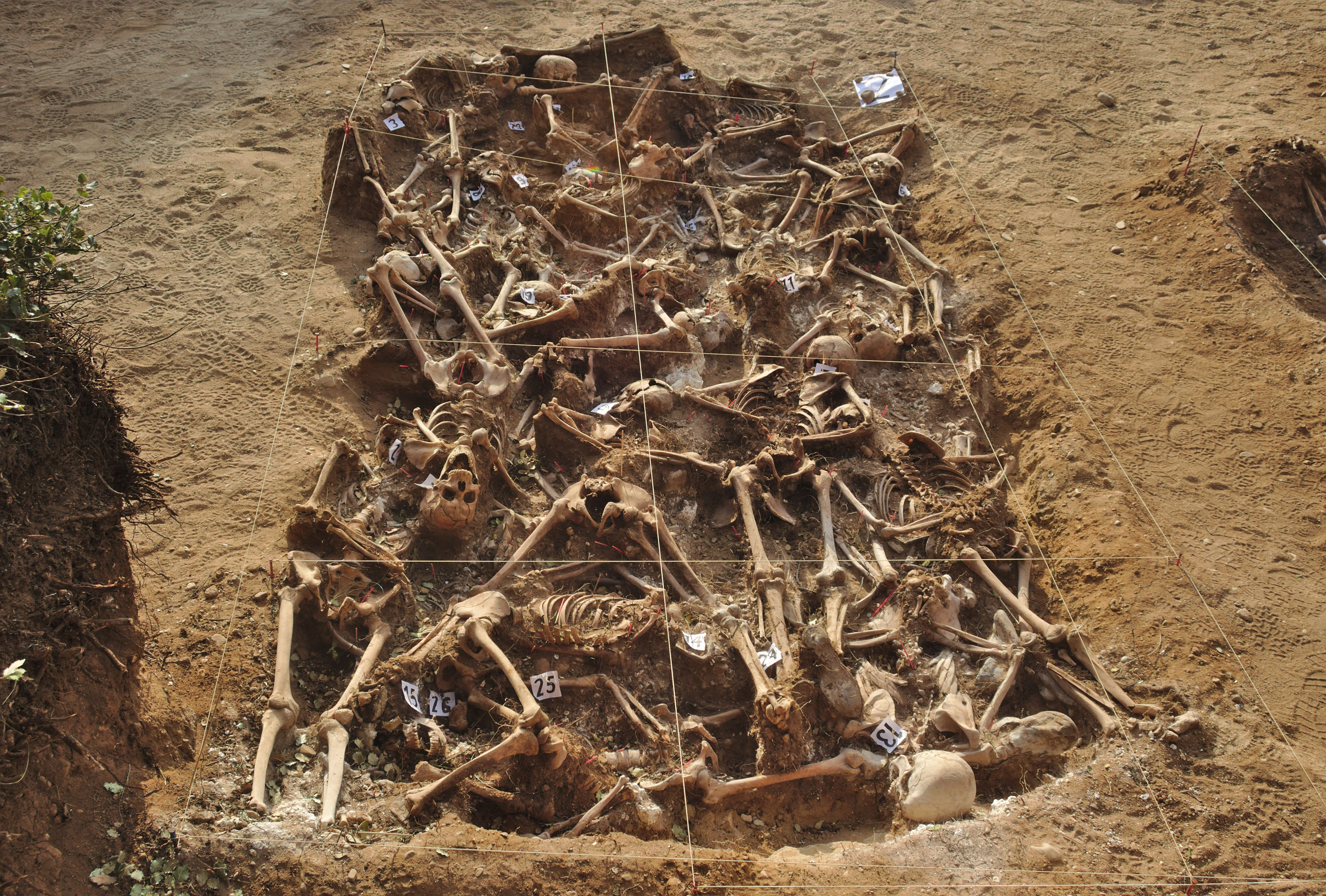

=== Identification of victims ===
The Association for the Recovery of Historical Memory make efforts to identify the bodies they exhume. However, by the time of the excavations at Estépar, the Spanish government under Mariano Rajoy did not give state support to such work, and the Association indicated that at this site the task of identification was going to be complex.

In 2017 it was reported that some victims had been reburied in the cemetery of Estépar. Among the people believed to have been killed at Estépar who remain to be identified are the composer Antonio José Martínez Palacios and his brother.
