= First Assembly of ETA =

First assembly of the Basque separatist group ETA

First ETA Assembly
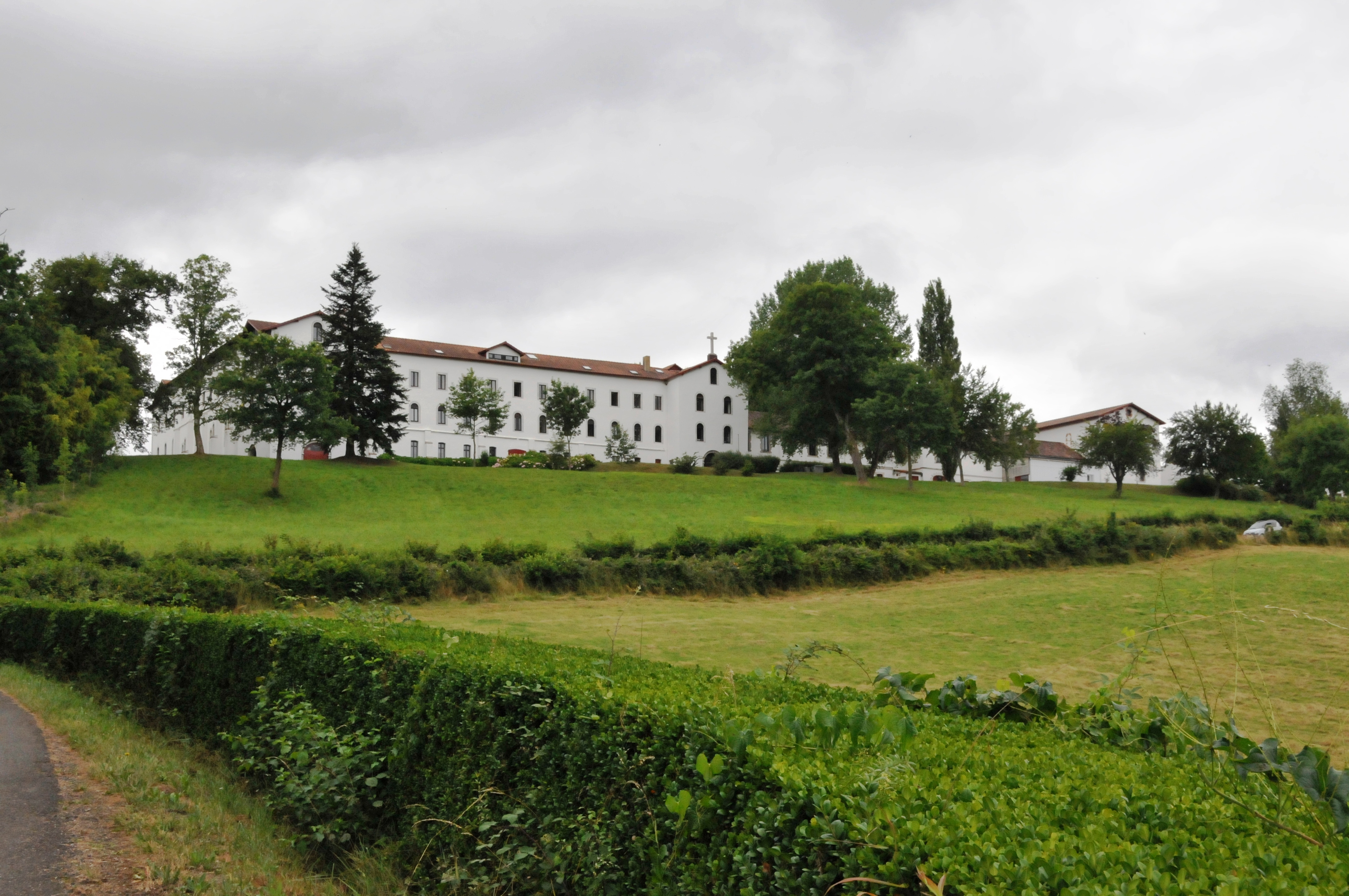
- Venue of the assembly
- Date: May 1962
- Location: Monastery of Our Lady of Belloc, France
- Type: Assembly
- Motive: Establishment of ETA
- Organized by: ETA
- Participants: Between 7 and 14 people

The First ETA Assembly was a meeting held by the former armed Basque separatist organization Euskadi Ta Askatasuna (ETA), rooted in Basque nationalist ideology, which took place in May 1962 at the Monastery of Our Lady of Belloc, located in Urt, a commune in the French Basque Country within France. This assembly occurred during the dictatorship of General Franco and marked the first such gathering since ETA’s founding in 1959. Its primary purpose was to define the organization’s objectives, methods, and structure. During the meeting, the militants drafted the Declaration of Principles, a document later widely distributed, and elected an Executive Committee that included figures such as Benito del Valle, Julen Madariaga, Patxi Iturrioz, and Txillardegi.

== Background ==
=== Franco's dictatorship ===
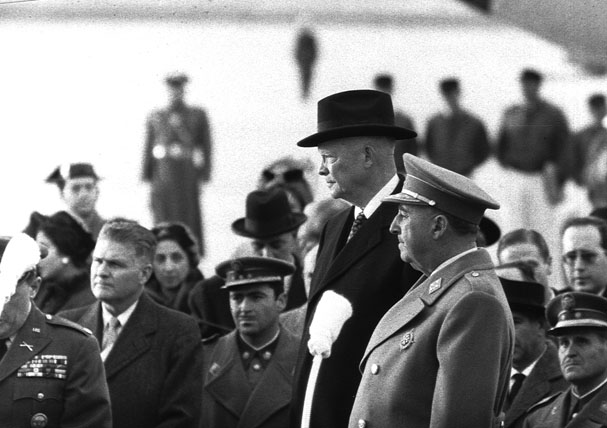
General Franco alongside U.S. President Eisenhower in Madrid, 1959. At the time, Spain was on the verge of bankruptcy, yet the regime persisted.

By the early 1960s, Franco’s dictatorship, which had been in power for over two decades, began showing signs of transformation, albeit limited ones. The autarky policy pursued until then had brought Spain to the verge of bankruptcy, compelling the regime to implement reforms starting in the late 1950s. From 1957, Laureano López Rodó spearheaded a reorganization of public administration, while Alberto Ullastres was committed to economic reform. The regime enacted a Law on Collective Agreements that permitted limited collective bargaining within the Spanish Syndical Organization. Meanwhile, the success of the European Economic Community underscored the drawbacks of Spain’s isolationist stance, leading to an application for accession in February 1962. Spain had already joined the Organisation for European Economic Co-operation (OECD) and the International Monetary Fund (IMF) in 1958. By mid-1959, severe trade deficits and rampant inflation forced a significant policy shift, overcoming Franco’s initial resistance.

On July 22, 1959, the regime introduced the Stabilization Plan, orchestrated by Mariano Navarro Rubio, Ullastres, and Gregorio López-Bravo. This plan included a devaluation of the peseta and secured a loan from the United States, encouraging foreign investment. (Note: Among other things, the limit on foreign ownership of companies was raised from 25% to 50% of the capital. Foreign investors were also allowed to repatriate a portion of annual dividends up to a limit of 6%.) Initially, the plan caused a rise in unemployment and a reduction in incomes, but within a short period, it prevented bankruptcy, doubled tourism revenue, and significantly increased foreign direct investment over the next two years. Subsequent measures included a tariff adjustment in 1960 and the nationalization of the Bank of Spain in 1962. A new breed of technocratic ministers introduced a distinct administrative style, setting themselves apart from the regime’s traditional ideological autocrats.

These changes sparked Spain’s most significant wave of industrialization and economic prosperity to date, with 1961 standing out as a particularly prosperous year. Tourism surged, positioning Spain as a competitive player on the global stage. Infant mortality rates dropped notably, from 69.84 per thousand in 1950 to 43.66 in 1960. However, wages remained stagnant between 1957 and 1961, and emigration to more industrialized European nations fueled growing discontent among workers. The push toward economic liberalism also gave rise to demands for greater freedoms, exemplified by a 1960 petition signed by intellectuals—including prominent figures such as José María Pemán—calling for regulation of censorship.

Franco’s system of organic democracy remained stable, but his advancing age, coupled with accidents and a 1961 diagnosis of Parkinson’s disease, raised questions about succession. In 1960, Franco met with Juan de Borbón, agreeing that Juan Carlos would pursue his education in Spain. Juan Carlos married Sophia of Greece in May 1962, coinciding with the timing of the ETA assembly.

=== The opposition ===
Following the defeat of the anti-Francoist Maquis in the 1950s, opposition to Franco weakened significantly. It was disorganized and deeply divided, with groups such as the Republican Democratic Action (ARDE) sustaining a largely ineffective government-in-exile led by Diego Martínez Barrio. The Basque Nationalist Party (PNV), alongside the Basque Nationalist Action (ANV), various republican factions, and the Spanish Socialist Workers' Party (PSOE), maintained the Basque government in exile. Within Spain, PSOE’s presence was minimal, and its affiliated union, the General Union of Workers (UGT), refused to participate in Francoist syndicates. An attempt in 1961 to form a Union of Democratic Forces with Christian democrats proved unsuccessful. The Communist Party, adopting a policy of national reconciliation in 1956, established clandestine workers’ commissions in 1958. These became the most significant internal opposition force, collaborating with dissident Catholics within the Spanish Syndical Organization.

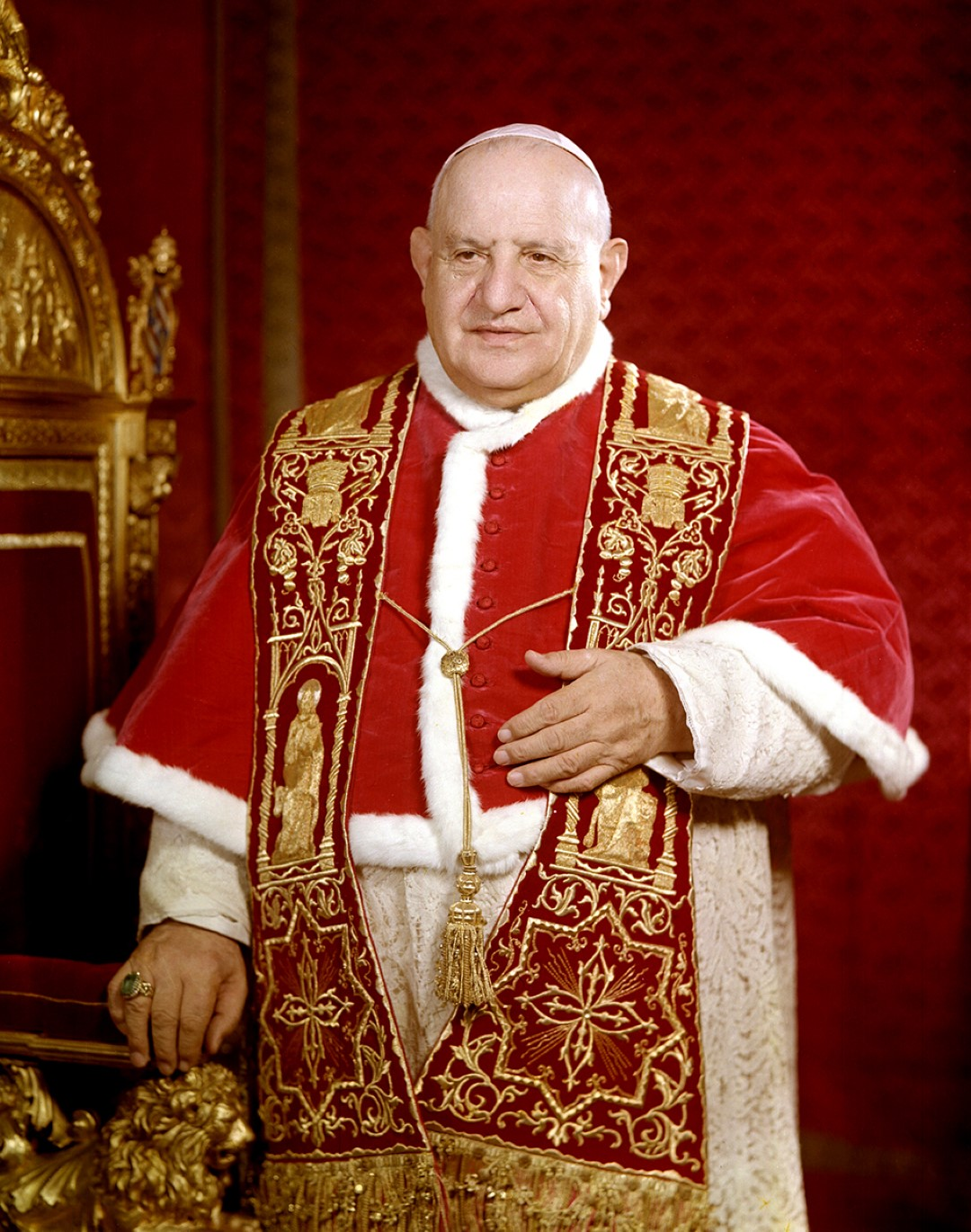
Pope John XXIII’s encyclical Mater et magistra provided a basis for criticism of Franco’s regime.

New opposition groups emerged during this period. The Popular Liberation Front (FELIPE) evolved from its Catholic origins into a radical Third Worldist leftist movement, with its Basque branch, Euskadiko Sozialisten Batasuna (ESBA), later aligning with ETA. The violent Iberian Revolutionary Liberation Directory (DRIL) carried out bombings in Madrid in 1960, possibly linked to the anarcho-syndicalist National Confederation of Labor (CNT) or reflective of growing militancy. The Asturian miners’ strike in April 1962 signaled rising unrest. Other groups, such as Dionisio Ridruejo’s Democratic Action and José María Gil-Robles’s Christian Social Democracy, functioned more as intellectual discussion circles than active resistance.

Unexpectedly, the Catholic Church became a source of opposition. Young priests, often linked to Catholic Action, joined liberal critics. Many members of the Workers' Brotherhood of Catholic Action (HOAC) supported the communist-led workers’ commissions. In 1960, 339 Basque priests signed a letter protesting the oppression of clergy and Basques. (Note: The priests wrote: Freedom is one of the most sacred and inviolable rights that the State must recognize and respect (...) In the police stations of our country, torture is used as a method of exploitation and search for the transgressor of a law that is often inconsequential and not infrequently unjust. A malicious suspicion is enough for the policeman or civil guard on duty to irresponsibly whip, torture and injure any citizen...) Although Enrique Pla y Deniel, the Primate of Spain, condemned this action, he also protested the repression of HOAC to José Solís, an official of the regime. The 1961 encyclical Mater et magistra, issued by Pope John XXIII, further fueled demands for progressive change. Meanwhile, the secular and socialist Workers' Syndical Union (USO), founded in 1961, emerged as a rival to the communist-led commissions.

=== ETA ===
ETA was founded on July 31, 1959, by former members of Ekin, a group frustrated with the passivity of the Basque Nationalist Party (PNV). These individuals broke away from PNV’s youth wing, Euzko Gaztedi Indarra (EGI), to form Euskadi Ta Askatasuna, though some suggest it may have been active as early as 1958. The name, meaning “Basque Country and Freedom” in the Basque language, reflected its commitment to “direct action” against Franco’s regime.

Initially, ETA focused on theoretical development and cultural promotion. As the PNV, it endorsed Christian democratic principles, such as support for a minimum wage. Violence was an inherent part of its ideology, though early actions were limited to graffiti and the sabotage of Francoist monuments.

ETA’s first attempted attack occurred on July 18, 1961, marking the 25th anniversary of the National Uprising that sparked the Spanish Civil War. (Note: The National Uprising was only the beginning of the armed insurrection against the government of the Second Republic that led to the Spanish Civil War.) The target was a Francoist train bound for San Sebastián, which ETA tried to derail by sabotaging the railroad. The intent was to make a symbolic statement rather than cause fatalities. (Note: José María Garmendia says that the attack was planned "with so many precautions that no one was harmed", and Gurutz Jáuregui affirms that it was "prepared in great detail to avoid casualties".) while Gurutz Jáuregui confirms the action was designed to avoid casualties. The attempt failed, with the train remaining on its tracks, triggering a wave of arrests and forcing many members into exile. Those detained faced torture, with sentences of up to twenty years handed down, despite a trend toward lighter penalties at the time. The crackdown nearly dismantled ETA, prompting many members to abandon the organization.

The surviving militants radicalized while in exile in the French Basque Country, receiving support from the Basque nationalist publication Enbata and from exiles in Mexico and Venezuela. They were shocked by the hostility of the PNV, despite their shared ideological origins.

By late 1961, ETA began planning its first assembly, the absence of such a meeting until then reflecting the group’s initial weakness and its overlap with PNV structures. The assembly was held outside Spain, on Basque soil, at the Monastery of Our Lady of Belloc, near Bayonne in the French Basque Country. Benedictine monks hosted the event, which saw between 7 and 14 male participants, a reduced number reflecting the losses sustained after the 1961 crackdown.

== Decisions of the assembly ==
The assembly formalized ideas from the Ekin period into what became known as the “Principles of ETA.”

=== Definition ===
ETA defined itself as a “Basque Revolutionary National Liberation Movement,” explicitly distinguishing itself from a traditional political party. Its mission was to lead various Basque forces toward “national reconstruction.” The term “revolutionary” referred to national liberation rather than socioeconomic transformation, aligning ETA with the conservative and Catholic traditions of the PNV, without the socialist leanings that would emerge later.

=== Objectives ===
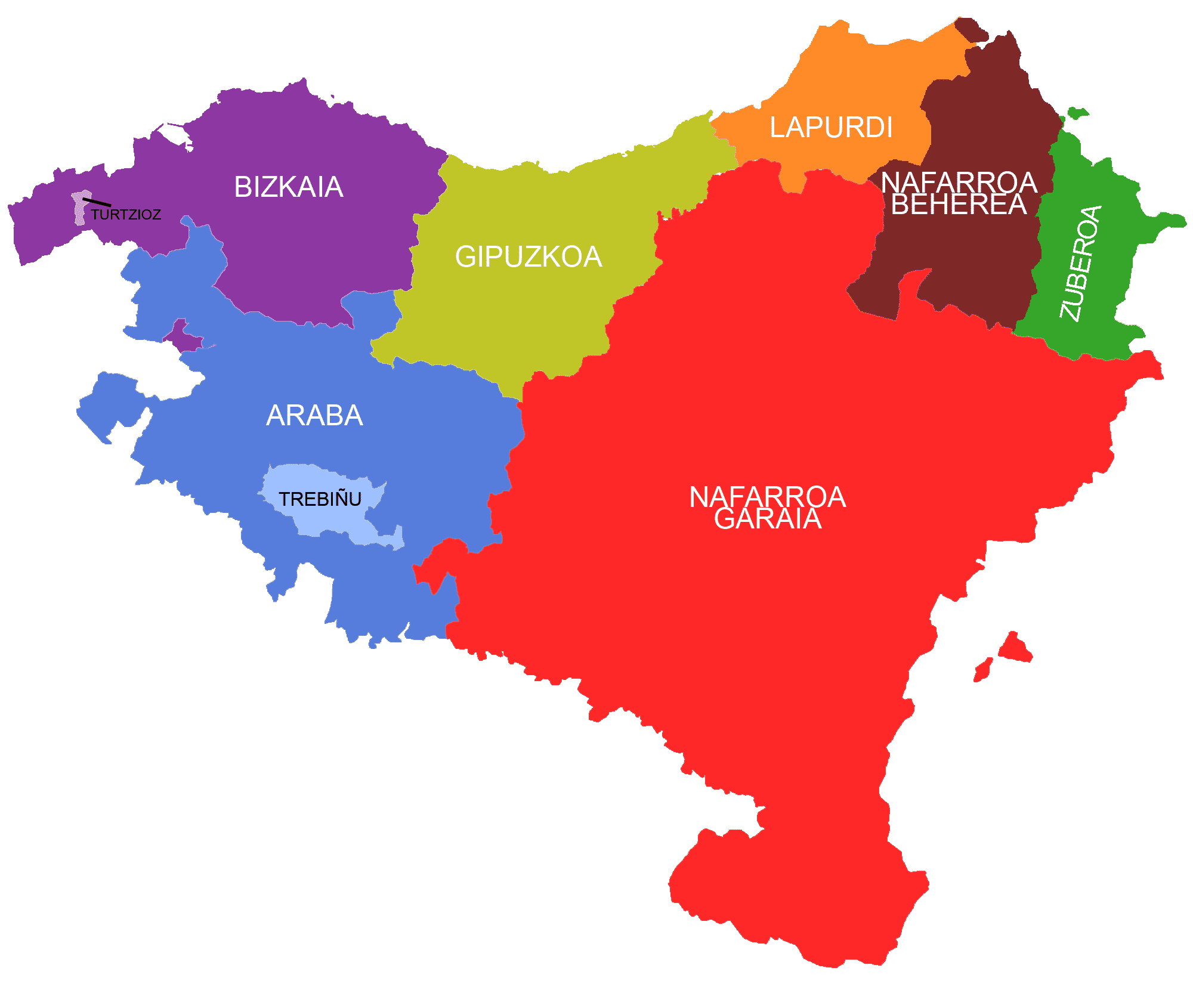
Map of the Basque state claimed by ETA, encompassing three northeastern regions in France and the remaining territories in Spain.

==== Independence ====
ETA’s central objective was the establishment of an independent Basque state encompassing the territories claimed by Basque nationalists: in Spain, the provinces of Álava, Gipuzkoa, Navarre, and Biscay; and in France, the regions of Lower Navarre, Labourd, and Soule. ETA considered these six areas as a unified territory, treating Lower Navarre as part of Navarre. The organization aimed to compel Spain and France to relinquish control, while remaining open to a vague notion of European federalism.

==== Representative democracy ====
The envisioned Basque state would operate as a democracy that upheld human rights, explicitly rejecting both fascism and communism. It would be unified under the nationalist framework established by Sabino Arana, the founder of Basque nationalism.

==== Economy ====
ETA opposed liberalism, advocating for the social function of property, the socialization of key economic sectors, economic planning, codetermination between workers and employers, the promotion of unions, a social insurance system, and progressive taxation. Despite PNV accusations, ETA was not communist, instead reflecting influences from Keynesianism and Catholic social teaching. At the time, Franco’s regime was developing its own Social Security system. ETA remained a bourgeois movement, maintaining distance from the working-class struggle.

==== Linguistic ethnocentrism ====
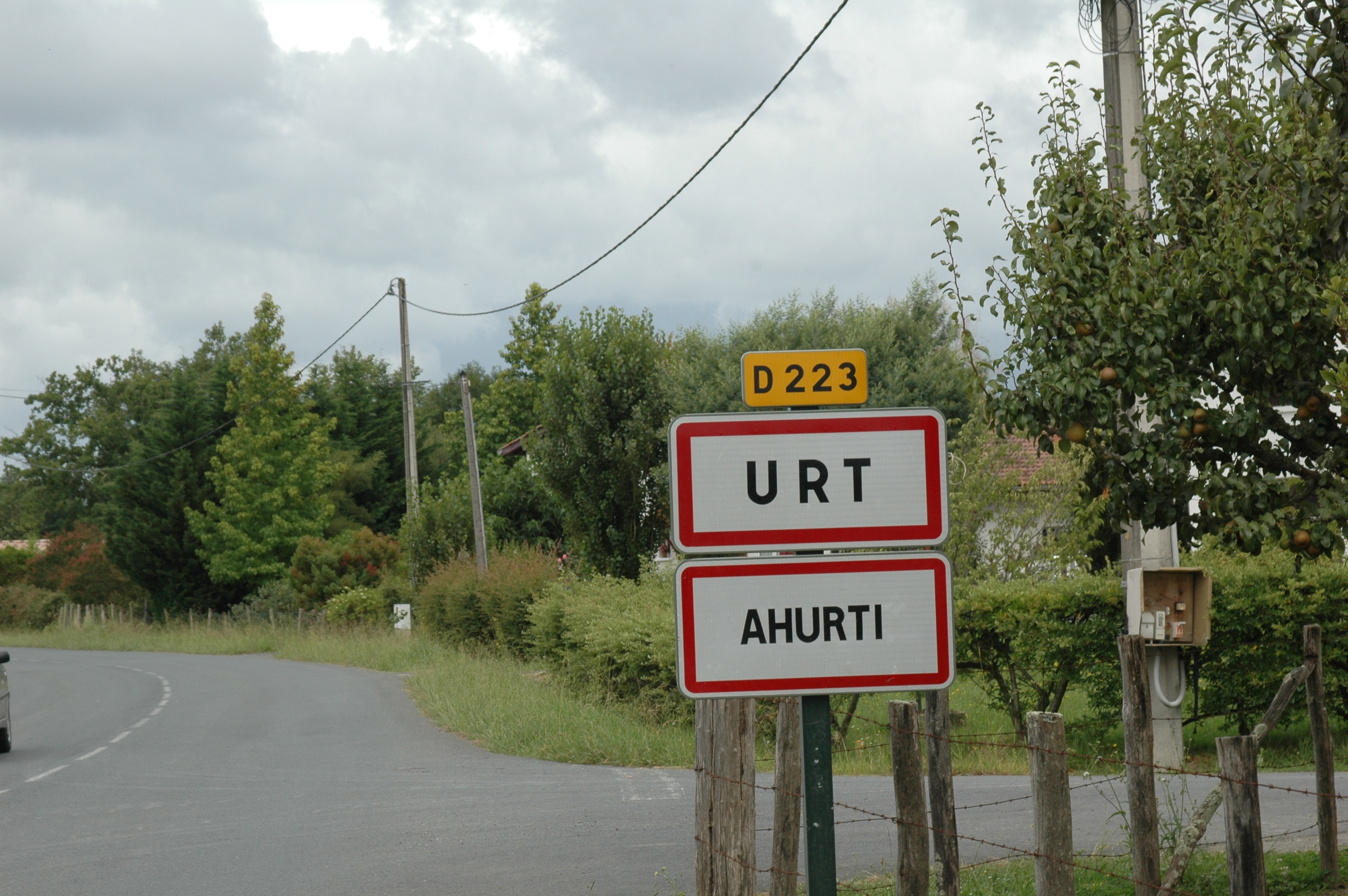
ETA supported the coexistence of Spanish and French with Basque. Pictured: a bilingual sign in Urt from 2007.

Under the influence of Txillardegi, ETA positioned the Basque language—banned under Franco—as the cornerstone of Basque identity, aiming for it to become the sole official language and the primary medium of education. Unlike Arana’s racial definition of Basque identity, ETA rejected racism. Drawing on linguistic structuralism, it argued that Basque shaped a unique worldview. While prioritizing Basque, ETA permitted temporary co-official status for Spanish and French, acknowledging the realities of migration and the challenges of preserving a pre-Roman language. (Note: However, there is no mention of the possible recognition of Gascon, a Romance language also spoken in the French Basque country.)

==== Religion ====
ETA endorsed the creation of a secular state, departing from the Aranist emphasis on Catholicism.

=== Organization ===
The assembly established itself as ETA’s supreme decision-making body, electing an executive committee led by José María Benito del Valle, alongside Julen Madariaga, Patxi Iturrioz, and other members. Madariaga was charged with overseeing the "military" branch and, as such, was responsible for procuring weapons. The assembly also formalized the publication Zutik!, as well as an internal bulletin called Kemen. Zutik! adopted a pluralistic tone, leading some to criticize it as confusing, while others viewed it as a call for nationalist unity.

=== Tactics ===
==== Armed struggle ====
While ETA’s official documents from the assembly avoided explicit references to violence despite the existence of a “military” branch, the post-1961 context and the assembly’s decisions suggested an armed approach, as evidenced by Julen Madariaga’s role in the military wing. The texts vaguely referred to “historical means” of struggle, a phrase interpreted as an allusion to violence, which Madariaga later openly declared as a state of war.

==== Alliances ====
ETA positioned itself as independent from political parties such as the PNV, but allowed for alliances with other groups as long as they did not compromise its core objectives.

== Significance ==
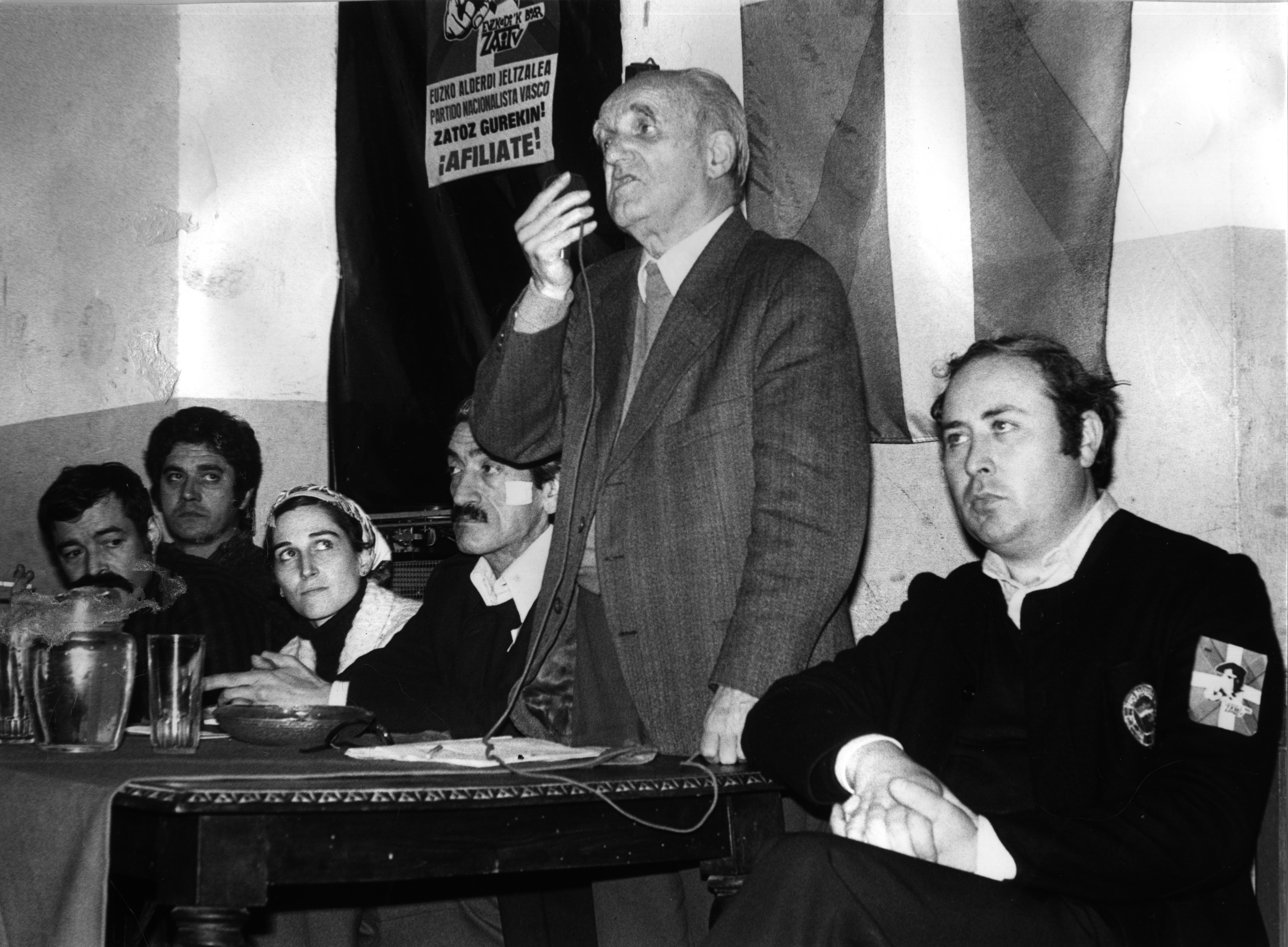
PNV leader Juan de Ajuriaguerra in a later photograph. The PNV opposed ETA from its early days.

The “Declaration of Principles” largely reiterated ideas from the Ekin period, including the rediscovery of Basque nationalism, a regenerationist outlook, the preservation of nationalist heritage, and adherence to Aranist notions of unity. It bore the influence of the PNV’s Christian democratic tendencies as well as the ANV’s commitment to a secular framework. Historian Gurutz Jáuregui described it as a restatement of prior ideas rather than a concrete action plan.

The declaration was published in four languages and distributed in 30,000 copies. The PNV interpreted it as a sign of communism, while leftist groups saw it as an extension of radical PNV ideology, deepening the divide between ETA and the PNV. The assembly bolstered ETA’s membership, particularly in Biscay and Gipuzkoa, setting the stage for its later actions, including the 1968 assassination of Melitón Manzanas, a police officer known for torturing detainees. By the Sixth ETA Assembly in 1970, ETA had shifted toward Marxism-Leninism, evolving into the Revolutionary Communist League. The ETA V-Assembly in 1970 marked an escalation of violence, leading to its classification as a terrorist organization. The formation of ETA militar in 1974 intensified its violent campaign, which persisted until a ceasefire was declared in 2011, followed by its dissolution in 2018.

== See also ==
- ETA (separatist group)

== Bibliography ==
- Bilbao Ariztimuño, Kepa (1996). Crónica de una izquierda singular [Chronicle of a Singular Left] (PDF) (in Spanish). pp. 20–22. Archived from the original (PDF) on October 20, 2017.
- Bruni, Luigi (1987). ETA: Historia política de una lucha armada. Vol. 1 [ETA: Political History of an Armed Struggle. Vol. 1] (in Spanish). Tafalla (Navarre): Txalaparta. pp. 40–44. ISBN 84-86597-03-X.
- Casanova, Iker (2007). ETA: 1958-2008: Medio siglo de historia [ETA: 1958-2008: Half a Century of History] (in Spanish). Tafalla (Navarre): Txalaparta. pp. 27–36. ISBN 978-84-8136-507-8.
- Fernández Soldevilla, Gaizka (July–December 2007). "El nacionalismo vasco radical ante la Transición Española" [Radical Basque Nationalism Facing the Spanish Transition]. Historia Contemporánea (in Spanish) (35): 817–844. ISSN 1130-2402.
- Garmendia, José María; Jáuregui, Gurutz; Domínguez, Florencio (2006). La historia de ETA [The History of ETA] (in Spanish). Madrid: Temas de hoy. pp. 106–209. ISBN 978-84-8460-594-2.
- Javato González, Víctor Manuel (June 2011). "ETA. Origen e ideología" [ETA: Origin and Ideology]. Ab Initio (in Spanish). II (3). Madrid: 143–163. ISSN 2172-671X.
- Leonisio Calvo, Rafael (2012). "Izquierda abertzale, de la heterogeneidad al monolitismo". III Congreso Internacional de Historia de Nuestro Tiempo [Left-wing Abertzale, from Heterogeneity to Monolithism] (in Spanish). Logroño: Universidad de La Rioja. pp. 377–388. ISBN 978-84-695-5155-4.
- Payne, Stanley G. (1987). El régimen de Franco, 1936-1975 [Franco's Regime, 1936-1975] (in Spanish). Madrid: Alianza Editorial. pp. 481-523. ISBN 84-206-9553-X.
- Rodríguez Román, Pablo (March 2010). "Orígenes de ETA y su desarrollo durante el Franquismo" [Origins of ETA and Its Development During Francoism] (PDF). Revista de Claseshistoria (in Spanish): 1–15. ISSN 1989-4988.
- Sullivan, John (1988). ETA and Basque Nationalism [ETA and Basque Nationalism]. London: Routledge. pp. 36–38. ISBN 0-415-00366-0.
- Tusell, Javier (1989). La España de Franco [Franco's Spain] (in Spanish). Madrid: Historia 16. pp. 153–182. ISBN 84-7679-124-0.
- Vilar, Sergio (February 1983). "La oposición a la dictadura franquista (1959-1976)" [Opposition to the Francoist Dictatorship (1959-1976)]. Historia 16 (in Spanish) (Extra XXV). Madrid: Información y revistas S.A.: 61–88.
- Woods, Alan; Val del Olmo, Eloy (2005). Euskal Herria y el socialismo [Basque Country and Socialism] (in Spanish). Madrid: Fundación Federico Engels. p. 165. ISBN 84-96276-10-4.
