= ETA (separatist group) =

Basque separatist group (1960–2018)

Euskadi Ta Askatasuna
- Euskadi Ta Askatasuna's symbol
- Leaders: Josu Urrutikoetxea; David Pla; Izaskun Lesaka; Mikel Irastorza
- Dates active: 31 July 1959 – 16 April 2018 (58 years, 259 days): 5 September 2010 (extant ceasefire); 8 April 2017 (disarmament); 16 April 2018 (dissolution)
- Headquarters: Greater Basque Country
- Active regions: Spain; France (Note: Largely as operative base and safe haven.)
- Ideology: Basque separatism; Basque nationalism; Revolutionary socialism; Marxism-Leninism; Factions: Liberation theology; European federalism
- Political position: Far-left
- Wars: Basque conflict

ETA emblem

ETA, (Note: English pronunciation: /ˈɛtə/ ET-ə; Basque: [eta]; Spanish: [ˈeta]) an acronym for Euskadi Ta Askatasuna (Note: Basque pronunciation: [eus̺kaði ta as̺katas̺una]) ('Basque Homeland and Liberty' or 'Basque Country and Freedom' in Basque), was an armed Basque nationalist and separatist organization active in Spain and France between 1959 and 2018. It was founded in 1959, during Francoist Spain, by a group of Basque nationalist students seeking to promote Basque identity and independence. Over time, ETA evolved into a clandestine paramilitary group that conducted a campaign of assassinations, bombings, and kidnappings primarily in Spain, particularly in the Basque Country and surrounding regions. ETA was considered the main organization of the Basque National Liberation Movement and played a central role in the Basque conflict, in which more than 850 people were killed, 2,600 were wounded, and nearly 90 were kidnapped. The group announced a definitive end to its armed activity in 2011 and formally dissolved in 2018.

ETA's motto was Bietan jarrai ("Keep up in both"), referring to the two figures in its symbol, a snake (representing politics) wrapped around an axe (representing armed struggle). Between 1968 and 2010, ETA killed 829 people (including 340 civilians) and injured more than 22,000. ETA was classified as a terrorist group by France, the United Kingdom, the United States, Canada, and the European Union. This convention was followed by a plurality of domestic and international media, which also referred to the group as terrorists. As of 2019, there were more than 260 imprisoned former members of the group in Spain, France, and other countries.

ETA declared ceasefires in 1989, 1996, 1998 and 2006. On 5 September 2010, ETA declared a new ceasefire that remained in force, and on 20 October 2011, ETA announced a "definitive cessation of its armed activity". On 24 November 2012, it was reported that the group was ready to negotiate a "definitive end" to its operations and disband completely. The group announced on 7 April 2017 that it had given up all its weapons and explosives. On 2 May 2018, ETA made public a letter dated 16 April 2018 according to which it had "completely dissolved all its structures and ended its political initiative".

== Structure ==
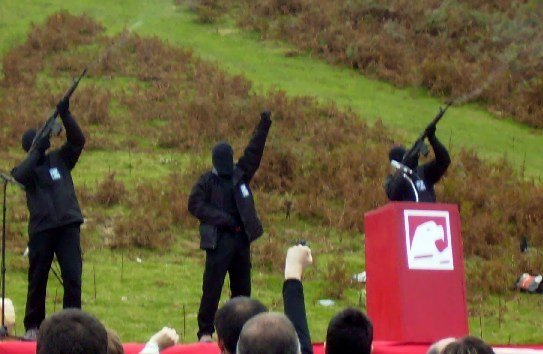
ETA members firing blanks during the Day of the Basque Soldier of 2006

ETA was initially organized in extreme hierarchy: a leading figure at the top, delegating into the logistical, military and political sections. Reports from Spanish and French police point towards significant changes in ETA's structures in its later years. ETA divided the three substructures into a total of eleven. The change was a response to captures, and possible infiltration, by the different law enforcement agencies. ETA intended to disperse its members and reduce the effects of detentions.

The leading committee comprised 7 to 11 individuals, and ETA's internal documentation referred to it as Zuba, an abbreviation of Zuzendaritza Batzordea (directorial committee). There was another committee named Zuba-hits that functioned as an advisory committee. The eleven different substructures were: logistics, politics, international relations with fraternal organisations, military operations, reserves, prisoner support, expropriation, information, recruitment, negotiation, and treasury.

ETA's armed operations were organized in different taldes (groups or commandos), generally composed of three to five members, whose objective was to conduct attacks in a specific geographic zone. The taldes were coordinated by the cúpula militar ("military cupola"). To supply the taldes, support groups maintained safe houses and zulos (small rooms concealed in forests, garrets or underground, used to store arms, explosives or, sometimes, kidnapped people; the Basque word zulo literally means "hole"). The small cellars used to hide the people kidnapped are named by ETA and ETA's supporters "people's jails". The most common commandos were itinerant, not linked to any specific area, and thus were more difficult to capture.

Among its members, ETA distinguished between legales/legalak ("legal ones"), those members who did not have police records and lived apparently normal lives; liberados ("liberated members") known to the police that were on ETA's payroll; and apoyos ("supporters") who gave occasional help and logistics support to the group when required.

There were also imprisoned members of the group, serving time scattered across Spain and France, that sometimes still had significant influence inside the organisation; and finally the quemados ("burnt out"), members freed after having been imprisoned or those that were suspected by the group of being under police surveillance. In the past, there was also the figure of the deportees, expelled by the French government to remote countries where they lived freely. ETA's internal bulletin was named Zutabe ("Column"), replacing the earlier one (1962) Zutik ("Standing").

ETA also promoted the kale borroka ("street fight"), which included violence on public transportation and against political parties' offices or cultural buildings, and property destruction of politicians, members of the military or police forces, banks, journalists, and council members. Tactics included threats, graffiti of political mottos, and rioting, usually using Molotov cocktails. These groups were mostly made up of young people, who were directed through youth organisations (such as Jarrai, Haika and Segi). Many members of ETA started their collaboration with the group as participants in the kale borroka.

== Ideology ==
ETA did not identify as Marxist from its inception, but soon after its founding it did gain such coloration and defined itself as a revolutionary socialist movement. The organization spoke of a distinctly Basque "national socialism" (socialismo nacional), a term that was used by numerous anti-colonial movements during the Cold War, as well as movements such as Peronism. From 1965 onwards, ETA had two distinct factions - the nationalist and socialist one, with the former subordinating class struggle to the national question, and the latter seeing the national question as subordinate to a greater class struggle. Early ETA also had European federalist influences thanks to the presence of Federico Krutwig, a Basque revolutionary who was a staunch Europhile and adhered to the views of Pierre-Joseph Proudhon and Menachem Begin. However, he left ETA in 1967 as Marxist factions became dominant.

The main and non-negotiable demand of the party was an independent Basque state stretching from northern Spain to southern France. It was said to combine 'conservative nationalism with communist ideology', as it centered its doctrine on Basque independence and socioeconomic struggle against capitalism, which it expressed through a slogan of "Basques as a people of workers". ETA postulated a two-fold cause for independence, based on both respect for Basque language and culture as well as the liberation of the working class. It intertwined the goal for a Basque nation-state for a socialist economy which was to consist of an equitable distribution of wealth and improved living standards for the Basque working class.

ETA defined itself as an anti-capitalist and anti-imperialist movement. Its ideology was described as a "combination of liberation theology, separatism, Catholicism and Marxism" and as "a nationalist, third-worldist organization of Marxist inclinations, with Catholic influences, especially from the Latin American inspired theology of liberation". The vision of Basque nationalism that ETA envisioned was "based not only on the Basque culture and language but also on the centrality of the Roman Catholic Church." According to Paddy Woodworth, ETA "passed through an ideological ferment, moving rapidly from Catholic social radicalism through a spectrum of anti-colonialist positions, ultimately defining itself as a Marxist-Leninist movement committed to Basque independence and socialism", and noted profound "religious overtones" in the theoretical documents of ETA.

According to the organization's Marxist-Leninist and ethnonational doctrine, despite the Spanish transition to democracy, Spain continued to be ruled and dominated by the same oligarchy and military, whose interests continued to depend on 'exploiting the masses', including the Basques and other ethnonational minorities in Spain. According to ETA, Spain transitioned into "Francoism without Franco" and is still based on the same state apparatus and capitalism. The party also attacked the Basque bourgeoisie, arguing that it collaborates with the Spanish elites as it also depends on the continued exploitation of the Basque working class, thus having a common interest with Madrid. ETA also claimed that "one cannot be a Basque patriot unless one is also a member of the Basque working class", as the collaboration of the Basque bourgeoisie with the Spanish bourgeoisie would result in the "elimination of all signs of a distinctive Basque ethnocultural identity". Moreover, the organization claimed that the American Central Intelligence Agency aids the Spanish and Basque governments and police forces against it, referring to the Spanish and Basque officials as "occupation forces". ETA went as far as to label drug smugglers "Spanish occupation forces" as well, claiming that they secretly collaborate with police forces.

Defining itself as an "armed socialist organization fighting for the national liberation of the Basque people", ETA envisioned an independent Basque state ruled by a Marxist-Leninist regime. It stressed the need for change, arguing that continued status quo in the Basque Country will result in an "unsustainable economic crisis, unemployment, progressive margination of the Basque culture and language, savage military occupation of the whole Basque territory". It did not ideologically oppose any negotiated settlement, but emphasized that "a negotiated settlement to any conflict presupposes an attitude of mutual recognition of the negotiating parties".

== Political support ==
A pro-ETA mural in Durango, Biscay

The former political party Batasuna, disbanded in 2003, pursued the same political goals as ETA and did not condemn ETA's use of violence. Formerly known as Euskal Herritarrok and "Herri Batasuna", it was banned by the Spanish Supreme Court as an anti-democratic organisation following the Political Parties Law (Ley de Partidos Políticos). It generally received 10% to 20% of the vote in the Basque Autonomous Community.

Batasuna's political status was controversial. It was considered to be the political wing of ETA. Moreover, after the investigations on the nature of the relationship between Batasuna and ETA by Judge Baltasar Garzón, who suspended the activities of the political organisation and ordered police to shut down its headquarters, the Supreme Court of Spain finally declared Batasuna illegal on 18 March 2003. The court considered proven that Batasuna had links with ETA and that it constituted in fact part of ETA's structure. In 2003, the Constitutional Tribunal upheld the legality of the law.

However, the party itself denied being the political wing of ETA, although double membership – simultaneous or alternative – between Batasuna and ETA was often recorded, such as with the cases of prominent Batasuna leaders like Josu Urrutikoetxea, Arnaldo Otegi, Jon Salaberria and others.

The Spanish Cortes (the Spanish Parliament) began the process of declaring the party illegal in August 2002 by issuing a bill entitled the Ley de Partidos Políticos which bars political parties that use violence to achieve political goals, promote hatred against different groups or seek to destroy the democratic system. The bill passed the Cortes with a 304 to 16 vote. Many within the Basque nationalistic movement strongly disputed the Law, which they considered too draconian or even unconstitutional; alleging that any party could be made illegal almost by choice, simply for not clearly stating their opposition to an attack.

Defenders of the law argued that the Ley de Partidos did not necessarily require responses to individual acts of violence, but rather a declaration of principles explicitly rejecting violence as a means of achieving political goals. Defenders also argued that the ban of a political party is subject to judicial process, with all the guarantees of the State of Law. Batasuna had failed to produce such a statement. As of February 2008 other political parties linked to organizations such as Partido Comunista de España (reconstituted) have also been declared illegal, and Acción Nacionalista Vasca and Communist Party of the Basque Lands (EHAK/PCTV, Euskal Herrialdeetako Alderdi Komunista/Partido Comunista de las Tierras Vascas) was declared illegal in September 2008.

A new party called Aukera Guztiak (All the Options) was formed expressly for the elections to the Basque Parliament of April 2005. Its supporters claimed no heritage from Batasuna, asserting that they aimed to allow Basque citizens to freely express their political ideas, even those of independence. On the matter of political violence, Aukera Guztiak stated their right not to condemn some kinds of violence more than others if they did not see fit (in this regard, the Basque National Liberation Movement (MLNV) regards present police actions as violence, torture and state terrorism). Nevertheless, most of their members and certainly most of their leadership were former Batasuna supporters or affiliates. The Spanish Supreme Court unanimously considered the party to be a successor to Batasuna and declared a ban on it.

After Aukera Guztiak had been banned, and less than two weeks before the election, another political group appeared born from an earlier schism from Herri Batasuna, the Communist Party of the Basque Lands (EHAK/PCTV, Euskal Herrialdeetako Alderdi Komunista/Partido Comunista de las Tierras Vascas), a formerly unknown political party which had no representation in the Autonomous Basque Parliament. EHAK announced that they would apply the votes they obtained to sustain the political programme of the now-banned Aukera Guztiak platform.

This move left no time for the Spanish courts to investigate EHAK in compliance with the Ley de Partidos before the elections were held. The bulk of Batasuna supporters voted in this election for PCTV. It obtained 9 seats of 75 (12.44% of votes) in the Basque Parliament. The election of EHAK representatives eventually allowed the programme of the now-illegal Batasuna to continue being represented without having condemned violence as required by the Ley de Partidos.

In February 2011, Sortu, a party described as "the new Batasuna", was launched. Unlike predecessor parties, Sortu explicitly rejects politically motivated violence, including that of ETA. However, on 23 March 2011, the Spanish Supreme Court banned Sortu from registering as a political party on the grounds that it was linked to ETA.

=== Social support ===
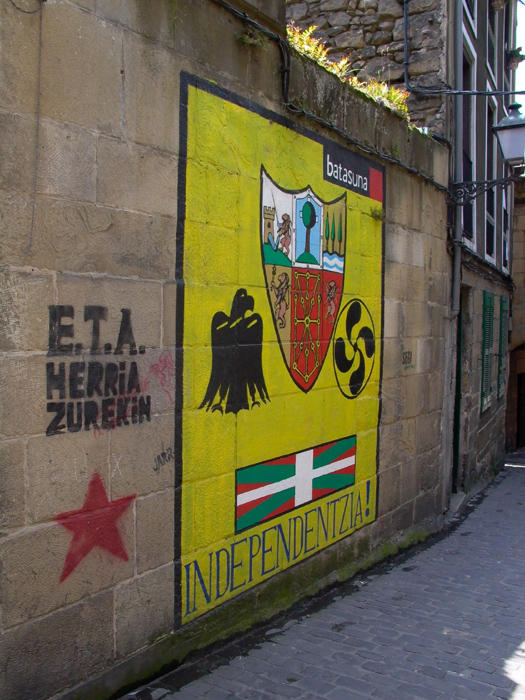
Graffiti in Pasai San Pedro (2003). "ETA, the people with you" on the left, and Batasuna using several nationalist symbols asking for "Independence!"

The Spanish transition to democracy from 1975 on and ETA's progressive radicalisation had resulted in a steady loss of support, which became especially apparent at the time of their 1997 kidnapping and countdown assassination of Miguel Ángel Blanco. Their loss of sympathisers had been reflected in an erosion of support for the political parties identified with them. In the 1998 Basque parliament elections Euskal Herritarrok, formerly Batasuna, polled 17.7% of the votes. However, by 2001 the party's support had fallen to 10.0%. There were also concerns that Spain's "judicial offensive" against alleged ETA supporters (two Basque political parties and one NGO were banned in September 2008) constituted a threat to human rights. Strong evidence was seen that a legal network had grown so wide as to lead to the arrest of numerous innocent people. According to Amnesty International, torture was still "persistent", though not "systematic". Inroads could be undermined by judicial short-cuts and abuses of human rights.

=== Clerical support ===
ETA was founded by students of the Benedictine seminary in Lazkao and owed its ability to survive the Francoist years of harsh repression to the support of Basque clergy, with many Basque priests having strong Basque nationalist and separatist tendencies. With the approval of the local ecclesiastical hierarchy, ETA was able to store its weapons in churches, chapels and monasteries. According to the US researcher Robert P. Clark, 73% of Basque priests were members of ETA in 1968. ETA was also able to survive because of profound sympathy it found in the French Basque Country, and the support of local Basque nationalists and clergy granted ETA safe haven in France, where it was beyond the reach of Francoist security forces.

Basque clergy was also important in terms of ideology of the organization, as it provided ETA with both new members as well as influences of the far-left liberation theology. Largely protected from Francoist persecution, Basque-speaking priests educated members of ETA in the Basque nationalist faith and were considered the guardians of Basque language and culture, heavily influencing Basque nationalism. Basque nationalism acquired a religious character, as evidenced by the motto of Basque Nationalist Party, 'Jaun-Goikua eta Legi Zarra' (God and Old Laws). Sabino Arana, the father of Basque nationalism, argued that the Basque Country could not be truly Catholic as long as it was dependent on Spain, and portrayed his struggle for independent Euskadi not as a political project, but rather as something that was 'about saving souls'.

ETA-supportive clergy accepted the violence of ETA, following the beliefs of liberation theology and seeing it as a part of the oppressed people's aspiration for freedom and independence. The Archbishop of San Sebastián José María Setién repeatedly justified the actions of ETA in his statements, causing consternation and even indignation in Spain. His statement that dialogue with ETA should have begun before it even stopped the attacks was condemned by the Filipino cardinal Jose Tomas Sanchez. Catholic clergy then played an important role in trying to mediate the conflict; in 1998 the Catholic organisation Community of Sant'Egidio offered to negotiate with the Spanish government on behalf of ETA, but it was turned down by the Minister of Interior Jaime Mayor Oreja. ETA still enjoyed support of the Basque clergy in the 2000s, with sympathetic priests such as Joseba Segura Etxezarraga consistently encouraging the Spanish government to enter dialogue.

=== Opinion polls ===
The Euskobarometro, the survey carried out by the Universidad del País Vasco (University of the Basque Country), asking about the views of ETA within the Basque population, obtained these results in May 2009: 64% rejected ETA totally, 13% identified themselves as former ETA sympathisers who no longer support the group. Another 10% agreed with ETA's ends, but not their means. 3% said that their attitude towards ETA was mainly one of fear, 3% expressed indifference and 3% were undecided or did not answer. About 3% gave ETA "justified, with criticism" support (supporting the group but criticising some of their actions) and only 1% gave ETA total support. Even within Batasuna voters, at least 48% rejected ETA's violence.

A poll taken by the Basque Autonomous Government in December 2006 during ETA's "permanent" ceasefire showed that 88% of the Basques thought that all political parties needed to launch a dialogue, including a debate on the political framework for the Basque Country (86%). Sixty-nine percent support the idea of ratifying the results of this hypothetical multiparty dialogue through a referendum. This poll also reveals that the hope of a peaceful resolution to the issue of the constitutional status of the Basque region has fallen to 78% (from 90% in April).

These polls did not cover Navarre, where support for Basque nationalist electoral options is weaker (around 25% of the population); or the Northern Basque Country, where support is even weaker (around 15% of the population).

== History ==
=== During Francoist Spain ===
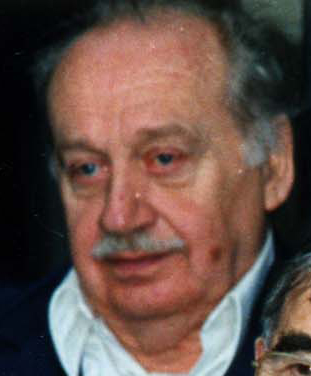
Federico Krutwig, the anarchist theorist of the ETA. He sought to move Basque nationalism away from its ethnic and religious origins.

ETA grew out of a student group called Ekin, founded in the early 1950s, which published a magazine and undertook direct action. ETA was founded on 31 July 1959 as Euskadi Ta Askatasuna ("Basque Homeland and Liberty" or "Basque Country and Freedom") by students frustrated by the moderate stance of the Basque Nationalist Party. (Originally, the name for the organisation used the word Aberri instead of Euskadi, creating the acronym ATA. However, in some Basque dialects, ata means duck, so the name was changed.)

ETA held their first assembly in Bayonne, France, in 1962, during which a "declaration of principles" was formulated and following which a structure of activist cells was developed. Subsequently, Marxist and third-worldist perspectives developed within ETA, becoming the basis for a political programme set out in Federico Krutwig's (an anarchist of German origin) 1963 book Vasconia, which is considered to be the defining text of the movement. In contrast to previous Basque nationalist platforms, Krutwig's vision was anti-religious and based upon language and culture rather than race. ETA's third and fourth assemblies, held in 1964 and 1965, adopted an anti-capitalist and anti-imperialist position, seeing nationalism and the class struggle as intrinsically connected.

Some sources attributed the 1960 bombing of the Amara station in Donostia-San Sebastian (which killed a 22-month-old child) to ETA, but statistics published by the Spanish Ministry of the Interior have always showed that ETA's first victim was killed in 1968. The Amara station attack was claimed by the Portuguese and Galician left-wing group Directorio Revolucionario Ibérico de Liberación (DRIL), together with four other very similar bombings committed that same day across Spain – all attributed to DRIL. Attribution of the 1960 attack to ETA has been considered to be unfounded by researchers. Police documents dating from 1961, released in 2013, show that the DRIL was indeed the author of the bombing. A more recent study by the Memorial de Víctimas del Terrorismo based on the analysis of police diligences at the time reached the same conclusion, naming Guillermo Santoro, member of DRIL, as the author of the attack.

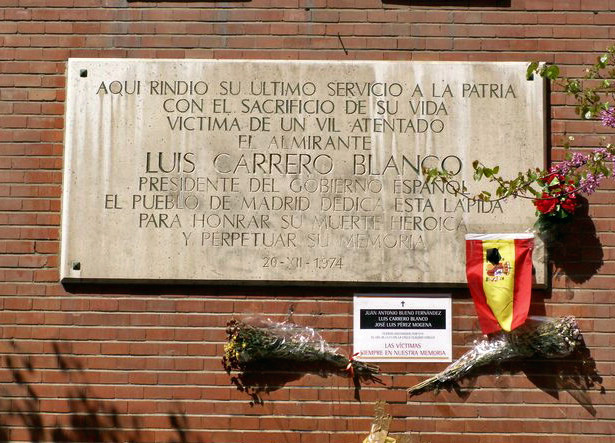
Memorial plate at the place of the assassination of Admiral Luis Carrero Blanco

ETA's first killing occurred on 7 June 1968, when Guardia Civil member José Pardines Arcay was shot dead after he tried to halt ETA member Txabi Etxebarrieta during a routine road check. Etxebarrieta was chased down and killed as he tried to flee. This led to retaliation in the form of the first planned ETA assassination: that of Melitón Manzanas, chief of the secret police in San Sebastián and associated with a long record of tortures inflicted on detainees in his custody. In December 1970, several members of ETA were condemned to death in the Burgos trials (Proceso de Burgos), but international pressure resulted in their sentences being commuted (a process which, however, had by that time already been applied to some other members of ETA).

In early December 1970, ETA kidnapped the German consul in San Sebastian, Eugen Biehl, to exchange him for the Burgos defendants. He was released unharmed on 24 December.

Basque nationalists who refused to follow the tenets of Marxism–Leninism and who sought to create a united front appeared as ETA-V, but lacked the support to challenge ETA.

The most significant assassination performed by ETA during Franco's dictatorship was Operación Ogro, the December 1973 bomb assassination in Madrid of Admiral Luis Carrero Blanco, Franco's chosen successor and president of the government (a position roughly equivalent to being a prime minister). The assassination had been planned for months and was executed by placing a bomb in a tunnel dug below the street where Carrero Blanco's car passed every day. The bomb blew up beneath the politician's car and left a massive crater in the road.

For some in the Spanish opposition, Carrero Blanco's assassination, i.e., the elimination of Franco's chosen successor was an instrumental step for the subsequent re-establishment of democracy. The government responded with new anti-terrorism laws which gave police greater powers and empowered military tribunals to pass death sentences against those found guilty. However, the last use of capital punishment in Spain when two ETA members were executed in September 1975, eight weeks before Franco's death, sparked massive domestic and international protests against the Spanish government.

=== During the transition ===
During the Spanish transition to democracy (which began following Franco's death), ETA split into two separate groups: ETA political-military or ETA(pm), and ETA military or ETA(m).

Both ETA(m) and ETA(pm) refused offers of amnesty, and instead pursued and intensified their violent struggle. The years 1978–1980 were to prove ETA's most deadly, with 68, 76, and 98 fatalities, respectively.

During the Franco dictatorship, ETA was able to take advantage of tolerance by the French government, which allowed its members to move freely through French territory, believing that in this manner they were contributing to the end of Franco's regime. There is much controversy over the degree to which this safe-haven policy continued even after the transition to democracy, but it is generally agreed that after 1983 the French authorities started to collaborate with the Spanish government against ETA.

The transition to democracy did not undermine core reasons for the existence of ETA, with a large part of its members remaining committed to armed struggle and local Basque community remaining supportive of it into the 1990s. This was caused by the character of Spanish transition, as it was based on the 'pact of forgetting' (Spanish: pacto de olvido). Francoist officials in the army, police and judiciary retained their posts, and no attempt was ever made to hold the representatives of the Francoist regime responsible for political violence and oppression. Left-wing Basque nationalist Rafael Díez Usabiaga recalled: "We confront the flagrant contradiction that in the Spanish state they still have not addressed something so fundamental as the crimes of Francoism."

ETA members were further radicalized by the shifting position of leading left-wing parties, the Communist Party of Spain and Spanish Socialist Workers' Party, on the issue of self-determination. In 1974 self-determination for the Basque Country was a part of PSOE platform, and the party asserted that "all nationalities and regions had the right to break free from the Spanish state". However, the party moved towards centralist position after 1976, and Spanish parties "abandoned all pretensions to support self-determination within a constitutional drafting committee". Basque parties connected to ETA such as KAS and the MLVN created a new far-left Herri Batasuna coalition to push for a statute of autonomy for Euskadi.

One of the parties within Herri Batasuna, ETA-affiliated KAS, listed five conditions from ETA that would need to be fulfilled for it to abandon armed struggle – amnesty for all Basque prisoners, legalisation of separatist Basque parties, withdrawal of Spanish police from Euskadi, improvement of the working class' living condition, and an autonomy statute that allowed for Basque self-determination. However, these demands were rejected by the Spanish government, and Madrid passed a new anti-terrorist law in 1978 that reintroduced Franco-esque policing methods; Robert Clark described the law and its consequences as "the long road back to Francoism without Franco".

The final issue that moved ETA towards continuing the armed struggle was the 1978 Spanish constitutional referendum. The new Spanish constitution was opposed by Basque nationalists as it was considered insufficient in terms of Basque autonomy, protection of the Basque language and providing Euskadi with no legal way towards achieving independence from Spain. Basque politicians decried the new constitution as "the continuing occupation of the Basque Country" and called for abstention from the constitutional referendum. As the result, the abstention rate in Euskadi was over 55%, and although 75% of Basque voters voted in favour of the new constitution, they represented only 31% of the Basque population. Because of this, "Euskadi remained the one region in the country in which a majority of the electorate did not support the foundational document of Spain's democracy."

In the 1980s, ETA(pm) accepted the Spanish government's offer of individual pardons to all ETA prisoners, even those who had committed violent crimes, who publicly abandoned the policy of violence. This caused a new division in ETA(pm) between the seventh and eighth assemblies. ETA VII accepted this partial amnesty granted by the now democratic Spanish government and integrated into the political party Euskadiko Ezkerra ("Left of the Basque Country").

ETA VIII, after a brief period of independent activity, eventually integrated into ETA(m). With no factions existing anymore, ETA(m) reclaimed the original name of Euskadi Ta Askatasuna.

==== GAL ====
During the 1980s, a "dirty war" ensued using the Grupos Antiterroristas de Liberación (GAL, "Antiterrorist Liberation Groups"), a paramilitary group which billed themselves as counter-terrorist, active between 1983 and 1987. The GAL's stated mission was to avenge every ETA killing with another killing of ETA exiles in the French department of Pyrénées Atlantiques. GAL committed 27 assassinations (all but one in France), plus several kidnappings and torture, not only of ETA members but of civilians supposedly related to those, some of whom turned out to have nothing to do with ETA. GAL activities were a follow-up of similar dirty war actions by death squads, actively supported by members of Spanish security forces and secret services, using names such as Batallón Vasco Español active from 1975 to 1981. They were responsible for the killing of about 48 people.

One consequence of GAL's activities in France was the decision in 1984 by interior minister Pierre Joxe to permit the extradition of ETA suspects to Spain. Reaching this decision had taken 25 years and was critical in curbing ETA's capabilities by denial of previously safe territory in France.

The airing of the state-sponsored "dirty war" scheme and the imprisonment of officials responsible for GAL in the early 1990s led to a political scandal in Spain. The group's connections with the state were unveiled by the Spanish journal El Mundo, with an investigative series leading to the GAL plot being discovered and a national trial initiated. As a consequence, the group's attacks since the revelation have generally been dubbed state terrorism.

In 1997, the Spanish Audiencia Nacional court finished its trial, which resulted in convictions and imprisonment of several individuals related to the GAL, including civil servants and politicians up to the highest levels of the Spanish Socialist Workers' Party (PSOE) government, such as former Homeland Minister José Barrionuevo. Premier Felipe González was quoted as saying that the constitutional state has to defend itself "even in the sewers" (El Estado de derecho también se defiende en las cloacas), something which, for some, indicated at least his knowledge of the scheme. However, his involvement with the GAL could never be proven.

These events marked the end of the armed "counter-terrorist" period in Spain and no major cases of foul play on the part of the Spanish government after 1987 (when GAL ceased to operate) have been proven in courts.

==== Human rights ====
According to the radical nationalist group, Euskal Memoria, between 1960 and 2010 there were 465 deaths in the Basque Country due to (primarily Spanish) state violence. This figure is considerably higher than those given elsewhere, which are usually between 250 and 300. Critics of ETA cite only 56 members of that organisation killed by state forces since 1975.

ETA members and supporters routinely claim torture at the hands of Spanish police forces. While these claims are hard to verify, some convictions were based on confessions while prisoners were held incommunicado and without access to a lawyer of their choice, for a maximum of five days. These confessions were routinely repudiated by the defendants during trials as having been extracted under torture. There were some successful prosecutions of proven tortures during the "dirty war" period of the mid-1980s, although the penalties have been considered by Amnesty International as unjustifiably light and lenient with co-conspirators and enablers.

In this regard, Amnesty International showed concern for the continuous disregard of the recommendations issued by the agency to prevent the alleged abuses from possibly taking place. Also in this regard, ETA's manuals were found instructing its members and supporters to claim routinely that they had been tortured while detained. Unai Romano's case was very controversial: pictures of him with a symmetrically swollen face of uncertain aetiology were published after his incommunicado period leading to claims of police abuse and torture. Martxelo Otamendi, the ex-director of the Basque newspaper Euskaldunon Egunkaria, decided to bring charges in September 2008 against the Spanish Government in the European Court of Human Rights for "not inspecting properly" cases tainted by torture.

As a result of ETA's violence, threats and killings of journalists, Reporters Without Borders included Spain in all six editions of its annual watchlist on press freedom up to 2006. Thus, the NGO included ETA in its watchlist "Predators of Press Freedom".

=== Under democracy ===
ETA performed their first car bomb assassination in Madrid in September 1985, resulting in one death (American citizen Eugene Kent Brown, employee of Johnson & Johnson) and sixteen injuries; the Plaza República Dominicana bombing in July 1986 killed 12 members of the Guardia Civil and injured 50; on 19 June 1987, the Hipercor bombing was an attack in a shopping centre in Barcelona, killing 21 and injuring 45; in the last case, entire families were killed. The horror caused then was so striking that ETA felt compelled to issue a communiqué stating that they had given warning of the Hipercor bomb, but that the police had declined to evacuate the area. The police said that the warning came only a few minutes before the bomb exploded.

In 1986, Gesto por la Paz (known in English as Association for Peace in the Basque Country) was founded; they began to convene silent demonstrations in communities throughout the Basque Country the day after any violent killing, whether by ETA or by GAL. These were the first systematic demonstrations in the Basque Country against political violence. Also in 1986, in Ordizia, ETA gunned down María Dolores Katarain, known as "Yoyes", while she was walking with her infant son. Yoyes was a former member of ETA who had abandoned the armed struggle and rejoined civil society: they accused her of "desertion" because of her taking advantage of the Spanish reinsertion policy which granted amnesty to those prisoners who publicly renounced political violence (see below).

On 12 January 1988, all Basque political parties except ETA-affiliated Herri Batasuna signed the Ajuria-Enea pact with the intent of ending ETA's violence. Weeks later on 28 January, ETA announced a 60-day "ceasefire", later prolonged several times. Negotiations known as the Mesa de Argel ("Algiers Table") took place between the ETA representative Eugenio Etxebeste ("Antxon") and the then PSOE government of Spain, but no successful conclusion was reached, and ETA eventually resumed the use of violence.

During this period, the Spanish government had a policy referred to as "reinsertion", under which imprisoned ETA members whom the government believed had genuinely abandoned violence could be freed and allowed to rejoin society. Claiming a need to prevent ETA from coercively impeding this reinsertion, the PSOE government decided that imprisoned ETA members, who previously had all been imprisoned within the Basque Country, would instead be dispersed to prisons throughout Spain, some as far from their families as in the Salto del Negro prison in the Canary Islands. France has taken a similar approach.

In the event, the only clear effect of this policy was to incite social protest, especially from Basque nationalists and families of the prisoners, claiming cruelty of separating family members from the insurgents. Much of the protest against this policy runs under the slogan "Euskal Presoak – Euskal Herrira" ("Basque prisoners to the Basque Country"; by "Basque prisoners" only ETA members are meant). In almost any Spanish jail there is a group of ETA prisoners, as the number of ETA prisoners makes it difficult to disperse them.

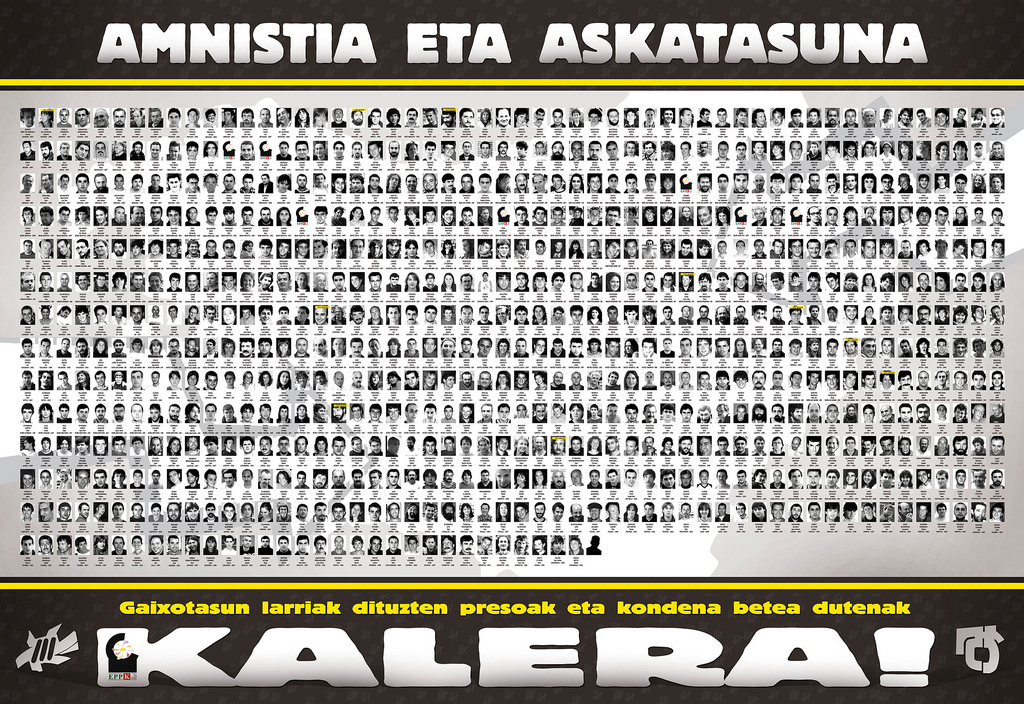
Banner in support of imprisoned ETA members, by Gestoras pro-Amnistía/Amnistiaren Aldeko Batzordeak ("Pro-Amnesty Managing Assemblies", currently illegal)

Gestoras pro Amnistía/Amnistiaren Aldeko Batzordeak ("Pro-Amnesty Managing Assemblies", currently illegal), later Askatasuna ("Freedom") and Senideak ("The Family Members"), provided support for prisoners and families. The Basque Government and several Basque nationalist town halls granted money on humanitarian reasons for relatives to visit prisoners. The long road trips have caused accidental deaths that are protested against by Nationalist Prisoner's Family supporters.

During the ETA ceasefire of the late 1990s, the PSOE government brought the prisoners on the islands and in Africa back to the mainland. Since the end of the ceasefire, ETA prisoners have not been sent back to overseas prisons. Some Basque authorities have established grants for the expenses of visiting families.

Another Spanish "counter-terrorist" law puts suspected terrorist cases under the central tribunal Audiencia Nacional in Madrid, due to the threats by the group over the Basque courts. Under Article 509 suspected terrorists are subject to being held incommunicado for up to thirteen days, during which they have no contact with the outside world other than through the court-appointed lawyer, including informing their family of their arrest, consultation with private lawyers or examination by a physician other than the coroners. In comparison, the habeas corpus term for other suspects is three days.

In 1992, ETA's three top leaders—"military" leader Francisco Mujika Garmendia ("Pakito"), political leader José Luis Alvarez Santacristina ("Txelis") and logistical leader José María Arregi Erostarbe ("Fiti"), often referred to collectively as the "cúpula" of ETA or as the Artapalo collective—were arrested in the northern Basque town of Bidart, which led to changes in ETA's leadership and direction.

After a two-month truce, ETA adopted even more radical positions. The principal consequence of the change appears to have been the creation of the "Y Groups", formed by young militants of ETA parallel groups (generally minors), dedicated to so-called "kale borroka"—street struggle—and whose activities included burning buses, street lamps, benches, ATMs, and garbage containers, and throwing Molotov cocktails. The appearance of these groups was attributed by many to the supposed weakness of ETA, which obliged them to resort to minors to maintain or augment their impact on society after arrests of leading militants, including the "cupola". ETA also began to menace leaders of other parties besides rival Basque nationalist parties.

In 1995, the armed group again launched a peace proposal. The so-called "Democratic Alternative" replaced the earlier Koordinadora Abertzale Sozialista (KAS) Alternative as a minimum proposal for the establishment of Euskal Herria. The Democratic Alternative offered the cessation of all armed ETA activity if the Spanish government would recognize the Basque people as having sovereignty over Basque territory, the right to self-determination, and that it freed all ETA members in prison. The Spanish government ultimately rejected this peace offer as it would go against the Spanish Constitution of 1978. Changing the constitution was not considered.

Also in 1995 was a failed ETA car bombing attempt directed against José María Aznar, a conservative politician who was the leader of the then-opposition Partido Popular (PP) and was shortly after elected to the presidency of the government; there was also an abortive attempt in Mallorca on the life of King Juan Carlos I. Still, the act with the largest social impact came the following year. On 10 July 1997, PP council member Miguel Ángel Blanco was kidnapped in the Basque town of Ermua, with the separatist group threatening to assassinate him unless the Spanish government met ETA's demand of starting to bring all ETA's inmates to prisons of the Basque Country within two days after the kidnapping.

This demand was not met by the Spanish government and after three days Miguel Ángel Blanco was found shot dead when the deadline expired. More than six million people took out to the streets to demand his liberation, with massive demonstrations occurring as much in the Basque regions as elsewhere in Spain, chanting cries of "Assassins" and "Basques yes, ETA no". This response came to be known as the "Spirit of Ermua".

Later acts of violence included the 6 November 2001 car bomb in Madrid which injured 65 people, and attacks on football stadiums and tourist destinations throughout Spain.

The 11 September 2001 attacks in the US appeared to have dealt a hard blow to ETA, owing to the worldwide toughening of "anti-terrorist" measures (such as the freezing of bank accounts), the increase in international policy coordination, and the end of the toleration some countries had, up until then, extended to ETA. Additionally, in 2002 the Basque nationalist youth movement, Jarrai, was outlawed and the law of parties was changed outlawing Herri Batasuna, the "political arm" of ETA (although even before the change in law, Batasuna had been largely paralysed and under judicial investigation by judge Baltasar Garzón).

With ever-increasing frequency, attempted ETA actions were frustrated by Spanish security forces.

On 24 December 2003, in San Sebastián and in Hernani, National Police arrested two ETA members who had left dynamite in a railroad car prepared to explode in Chamartín Station in Madrid. On 1 March 2004, in a place between Alcalá de Henares and Madrid, a light truck with 536 kg of explosives was discovered by the Guardia Civil.

ETA was initially blamed for the 2004 Madrid bombings by the outgoing government and large sections of the press. However, the group denied responsibility and Islamic fundamentalists from Morocco were eventually convicted. The judicial investigation currently states that there is no relationship between ETA and the Madrid bombings.

==== 2006 ceasefire declaration and subsequent discontinuation ====
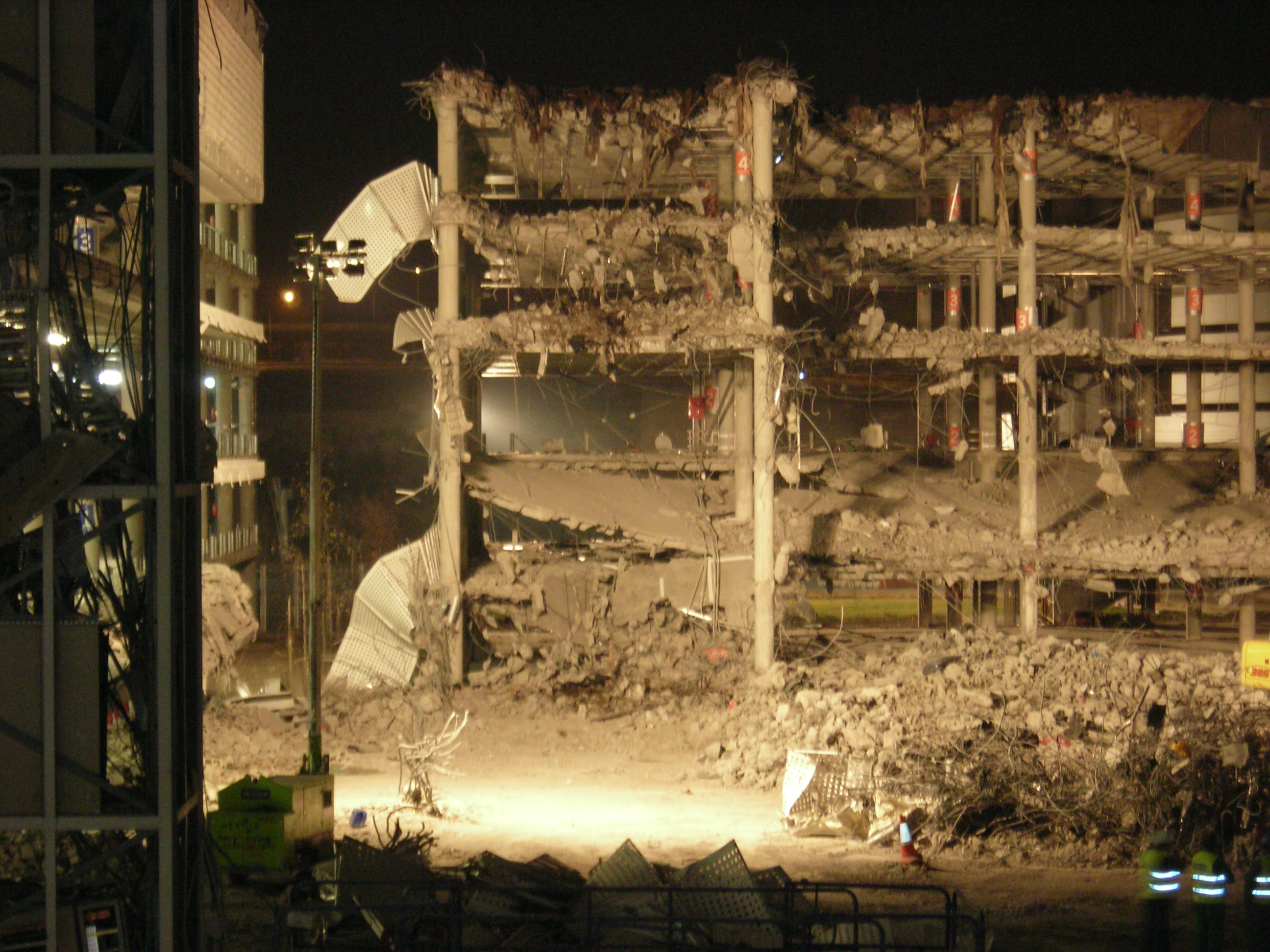
Barajas Airport parking lot after the bomb

In the context of negotiation with the Spanish government, ETA declared what it described as a "truce" several times since its creation.

On 22 March 2006, ETA sent a DVD message to the Basque Network Euskal Irrati-Telebista and the journals Gara and Berria with a communiqué from the group announcing what it called a "permanent ceasefire" that was broadcast over Spanish TV.

Talks with the group were then officially opened by Spanish Presidente del Gobierno José Luis Rodríguez Zapatero.

These took place all over 2006, not free from incidents such as an ETA cell stealing some 300 handguns, ammunition and spare parts in France in October 2006. or a series of warnings made by ETA such as the one of 23 September, when masked ETA militants declared that the group would "keep taking up arms" until achieving "independence and socialism in the Basque country", which were regarded by some as a way to increase pressure on the talks, by others as a tactic to reinforce ETA's position in the negotiations.

Finally, on 30 December 2006 ETA detonated a van bomb after three confusing warning calls, in a parking building at the Madrid Barajas international airport. The explosion caused the collapse of the building and killed two Ecuadorian immigrants who were napping inside their cars in the parking building. At 6:00 pm, José Luis Rodríguez Zapatero released a statement stating that the "peace process" had been discontinued.

=== 2008 to present ===
In January 2008, ETA stated that its call for independence is similar to that of the Kosovo status and Scotland. In the week of 8 September 2008, two Basque political parties were banned by a Spanish court for their secretive links to ETA. In another case in the same week, 21 people were convicted whose work on behalf of ETA prisoners actually belied secretive links to the armed separatists themselves. ETA reacted to these actions by placing three major car bombs in less than 24 hours in northern Spain.

In April 2009 Jurdan Martitegi was arrested, making him the fourth consecutive ETA military chief to be captured within a single year, an unprecedented police record, further weakening the group. Violence surged in the middle of 2009, with several ETA attacks leaving three people dead and dozens injured around Spain. Amnesty International condemned these attacks as well as ETA's "grave human rights abuses".

The Basque newspaper Gara published an article that suggested that ETA member Jon Anza could have been killed and buried by Spanish police in April 2009. The central prosecutor in the French town of Bayonne, Anne Kayanakis, announced, as the official version, that the autopsy carried out on the body of Jon Anza – a suspected member of the armed Basque group ETA, missing since April 2009 – revealed no signs of having been beaten, wounded or shot, which should rule out any suspicions that he died from unnatural causes. Nevertheless, that very magistrate denied the demand of the family asking for the presence of a family doctor during the autopsy. After this, Jon Anza's family members asked for a second autopsy to be carried out.

In December 2009, Spain raised its terror alert after warning that ETA could be planning major attacks or high-profile kidnappings during Spain's European Union presidency. The next day, after being asked by the opposition, Alfredo Pérez Rubalcaba said that warning was part of a strategy.

==== 2010 ceasefire ====
On 5 September 2010, ETA declared a new ceasefire, its third after two previous ceasefires were ended by the group. A spokesperson speaking on a video announcing the ceasefire said the group wished to use "peaceful, democratic means" to achieve its aims, though it was not specified whether the ceasefire was considered permanent by the group. ETA claimed that it had decided to initiate a ceasefire several months before the announcement. In the part of the video, the spokesperson said that the group was "prepared today as yesterday to agree to the minimum democratic conditions necessary to put in motion a democratic process if the Spanish government is willing".

The announcement was met with a mixed reaction; Basque nationalist politicians responded positively and said that the Spanish and international governments should do the same, while the Spanish interior counsellor of Basque, Rodolfo Ares, said that the committee did not go far enough. He said that he considered ETA's statement "absolutely insufficient" because it did not commit to a complete termination of what Ares considered "terrorist activity" by the group.

==== 2011 permanent ceasefire and cessation of armed activity ====
The final declaration of the Donostia-San Sebastián International Peace Conference (17 October 2011) led to an announcement of the cessation of armed activity by ETA.

On 10 January 2011, ETA declared that their September 2010 ceasefire would be permanent and verifiable by international observers. Observers urged caution, pointing out that ETA had broken permanent ceasefires in the past, whereas Prime Minister José Luis Rodríguez Zapatero (who left office in December 2011) demanded that ETA declare that it had given up violence once and for all. After the declaration, Spanish press started speculating of a possible Real IRA-type split within ETA, with hardliners forming a new more violent offshoot led by "Dienteputo".

On 21 October 2011, ETA announced a cessation of armed activity via video clip sent to media outlets following the Donostia-San Sebastián International Peace Conference, which was attended by former UN Secretary-General Kofi Annan, former Taoiseach of Ireland Bertie Ahern, former prime minister of Norway Gro Harlem Brundtland (an international leader in sustainable development and public health), former Interior Minister of France Pierre Joxe, president of Sinn Féin Gerry Adams (a Teachta Dála in Dáil Éireann), and British diplomat Jonathan Powell, who served as the first Downing Street Chief of Staff.

They all signed a final declaration that was supported also by former UK Prime Minister Tony Blair, the former US president and 2002 Nobel Peace Prize winner Jimmy Carter, and the former US senator and former US Special Envoy for Middle East Peace George J. Mitchell. The meeting did not include Spanish or French government representatives. The day after the ceasefire, in a contribution piece to The New York Times, Tony Blair indicated that lessons in dealing with paramilitary separatist groups can be learned from how the Spanish administration handled ETA. Blair wrote, "governments must firmly defend themselves, their principles and their people against terrorists. This requires good police and intelligence work as well as political determination. [However], firm security pressure on terrorists must be coupled with offering them a way out when they realize that they cannot win by violence. Terrorist groups are rarely defeated by military means alone". Blair also suggested that Spain would need to discuss weapon decommissioning, peace strategies, reparations for victims, and security with ETA, as Britain discussed with the Provisional IRA.

ETA had declared ceasefires many times before, most significantly in 1999 and 2006, but the Spanish government and media outlets expressed particularly hopeful opinions regarding the permanence of this proclamation. Spanish premier José Luis Rodríguez Zapatero described the move as "a victory for democracy, law and reason". Additionally, the effort of security and intelligence forces in Spain and France are cited by politicians as the primary instruments responsible for the weakening of ETA. The optimism may come as a surprise considering ETA's failure to renounce the independence movement, which has been one of the Spanish government's requirements.

Less optimistically, Spanish Prime Minister Mariano Rajoy of the centre-right People's Party expressed the need to push for the full dissolution of ETA. The People's Party has emphasized the obligation of the state to refuse negotiations with separatist movements since former Prime Minister José María Aznar was in office. Aznar was responsible for banning media outlets seen as subversive to the state and Batasuna, the political party of ETA. Additionally, in preparation for his party's manifesto, on 30 October 2011, Rajoy declared that the People's Party would not negotiate with ETA under threats of violence nor announcements of the group's termination, but would instead focus party efforts on remembering and honouring victims of separatist violence.

This event may not alter the goals of the Basque separatist movement but will change the method of the fight for a more autonomous state. Negotiations with the newly elected administration may prove difficult with the return to the centre-right People's Party, which is replacing Socialist control, due to pressure from within the party to refuse all ETA negotiations.

In September 2016, French police stated that they did not believe ETA had made progress in giving up arms. In March 2017, well-known French-Basque activist Jean-Noël Etxeverry was quoted as having told Le Monde, "ETA has made us responsible for the disarmament of its arsenal, and by the afternoon of 8 April, ETA will be completely unarmed." On 7 April, the BBC reported that ETA would disarm "tomorrow", including a photo of a stamped ETA letter attesting to this. The French police found 3.5 tonnes of weapons on 8 April, the following day, at the caches handed over by ETA.

ETA, for its part, issued a statement endorsing the 2017 Catalan independence referendum.

==== End of political activity ====
In a letter to online newspaper El Diario, published on 2 May 2018, ETA formally announced that it had "completely dissolved all its structures and ended its political initiative" on 16 April 2018.

A leading left-wing Basque nationalist politician and former ETA member, Arnaldo Otegi, the general coordinator of the Basque coalition party EH Bildu, has said the violence ETA used in its quest for independence "should never have happened" and it ought to have laid down its arms far earlier than it did.

== Victims, tactics and attacks ==
=== Victims ===
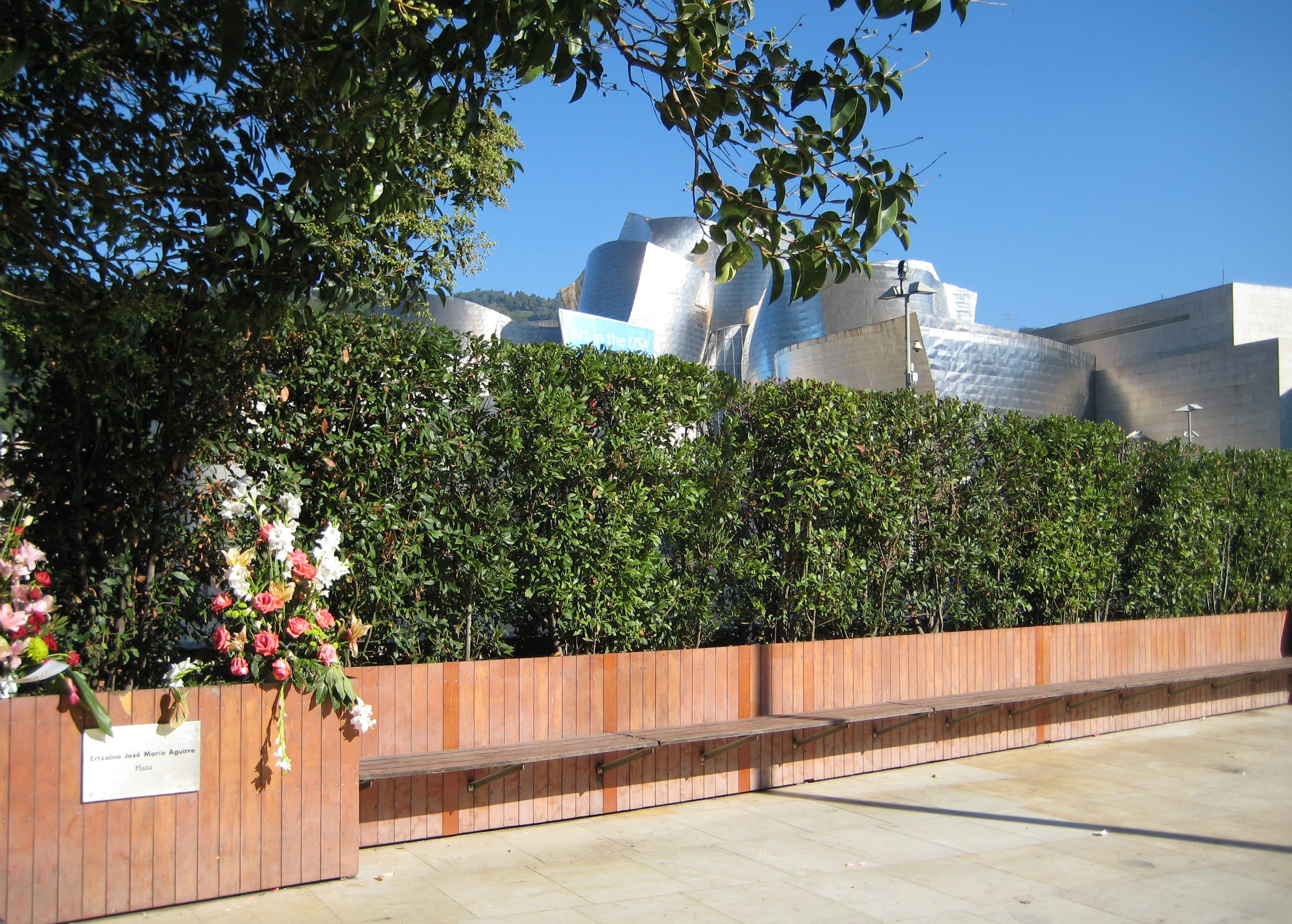
Flowers and a plate remember Ertzaina officer José "Txema" Agirre, shot dead by ETA gunmen in 1997 while protecting the Guggenheim Bilbao Museum (visible in the background)

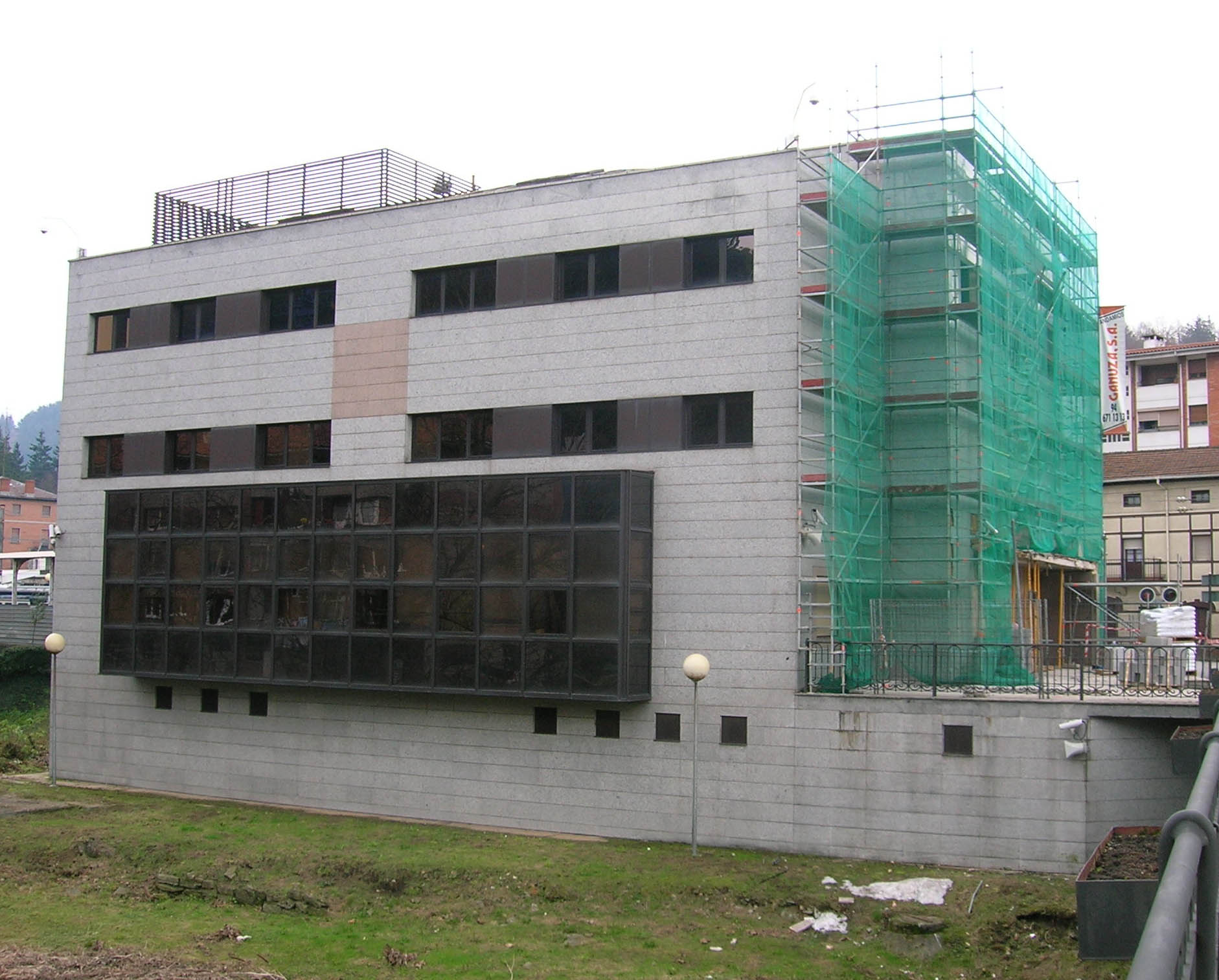
Repairs to the Balmaseda law courts after a bombing in 2006

ETA's targets expanded from military or police-related personnel and their families to a wider array, which included the following:

- Francoist leaders, such as Prime Minister Admiral Luis Carrero Blanco, Franco's successor was killed in a bombing on 20 December 1973.
- Spanish military and police personnel, active duty or retired. The barracks of the Guardia Civil also provide housing for their families, thus, attacks on the barracks have also resulted in deaths of relatives, including children. As the regional police (Ertzaintza in the Basque Country and Mossos d'Esquadra in Catalonia) took a greater role in combating ETA, they were added to their list of targets.
- Businessmen (such as Javier Ybarra and Ignacio Uria Mendizabal): these are mainly targeted in order to extort them for the so-called "revolutionary tax". Refusal to pay has been punished with assassinations, kidnappings for ransom or bombings of their business.
- Prison officers such as José Antonio Ortega Lara.
- Elected parliamentarians, city councillors and ex-councillors, politicians in general: most prominently Luis Carrero Blanco (killed in 1973). Dozens of politicians belonging to the People's Party (PP) and Spanish Socialist Workers' Party (PSOE) were assassinated or maimed. Some Basque nationalist politicians from the PNV party, such as Juan Mari Atutxa, also received threats. Hundreds of politicians in Spain required a constant bodyguard service. Bodyguards are contingent victims as well. In 2005 ETA announced that it would no longer "target" elected politicians. Nonetheless, ETA killed ex-council member Isaías Carrasco in Mondragon/Arrasate on 7 March 2008.
- Judges and prosecutors. Particularly threatened were the members of the Spanish anti-terrorist court: the Audiencia Nacional.
- University professors who publicly expressed ideas that countered armed Basque separatism: such as Manuel Broseta or Francisco Tomás y Valiente. In the latter case, the shooting resulted in more than half a million people protesting against ETA.
- Journalists: some of these professionals began to be labelled by ETA as targets starting with the killing of journalist José Luis López de la Calle, assassinated in May 2000.
- Economic targets: a wide array of private or public property considered valuable assets of Spain, especially railroads, tourist sites, industries, or malls.
- Exceptionally, ETA also assassinated former ETA members such as María Dolores Katarain as a reprisal for having left the group.
- A number of ETA attacks by car bomb caused random civilian casualties, like ETA's bloodiest attack, the bombing in 1987 of the subterranean parking lot of the Hipercor supermarket in Barcelona which killed 21 civilians and left 45 seriously wounded, of whom 20 were left disabled; also the attack of Plaza de Callao in Madrid.

=== Tactics ===
ETA's tactics included:

- Direct attacks: killing by shooting the victim in the nape.
- Bombings (often with car bombs). When the bombs targeted individuals for assassination they were often surreptitiously rigged in the victim's car. The detonating systems varied. They were rarely manually ignited but instead, for example, wired so the bomb would explode on the ignition or when the car went over a set speed limit. Sometimes the bomb was placed inside a stolen car with false plates, parked along the route of the objective, and the explosive remotely activated when the target passed by (e.g. V.I.P. cars, police patrols or military vehicles).

These bombs sometimes killed family members of ETA's target victim and bystanders. When the bombs were large car-bombs seeking to produce large damage and terror, they were generally announced by one or more telephone calls made to newspapers speaking in the name of ETA. Charities (usually Detente Y Ayuda—DYA) were also used to announce the threat if the bomb was in a populated area. The type of explosives used in these attacks was initially Goma-2 or self-produced ammonal. After several successful robberies in France, ETA began using Titadyne.

- Shells: hand-made mortars (the Jo ta ke model) were occasionally used to attack military or police bases. Their lack of precision was probably the reason their use was discontinued.
- Anonymous threats: often delivered in the Basque Country by placards or graffiti. Such threats forced many people into hiding or exile from the Basque Country and were used to prevent people from freely expressing political ideas other than Basque nationalist ones.
- Extortion or blackmail: called by ETA a "revolutionary tax", demanding money from a business owner in the Basque Country or elsewhere in Spain, under threats to him and his family, up to and including death threats. Occasionally, some French Basques were threatened in this manner, such as footballer Bixente Lizarazu. ETA moved the extorted funds to accounts in Liechtenstein and other fiscal havens. According to French judiciary sources, as of 2008 ETA exacted an estimated €900,000 a year in this manner.
- Kidnapping: often as a punishment for failing to pay the blackmail known as "revolutionary tax", but was also used to try to force the government to free ETA prisoners under the threat of killing the kidnapped, as in the kidnapping and execution of Miguel Angel Blanco. ETA often hid the kidnapped in underground chambers without windows, called zulos, of very reduced dimensions for extended periods. Also, people robbed of their vehicles would usually be tied up and abandoned in an isolated place to allow those who carjacked them to escape.
- Robbery: ETA members also stole weapons, explosives, machines for registration plates and vehicles.

== Activity ==
With its attacks against what they considered "enemies of the Basque people", ETA killed over 820 people since 1968, including more than 340 civilians. It maimed hundreds more and kidnapped dozens. ETA was opposed to Lemóniz Nuclear Power Plant.

Its ability to inflict violence had declined steadily since the group was at its strongest during the late 1970s and 1980 (when it killed 92 people in a single year). After decreasing peaks in the fatal casualties in 1987 and 1991, 2000 was the last year when ETA killed more than 20 in a single year. After 2002, the yearly number of ETA's fatal casualties was reduced to single digits.

Similarly, over the 1990s and, especially, during the 2000s, fluid cooperation between the French and Spanish police, state-of-the-art tracking devices and techniques and, apparently, police infiltration allowed increasingly repeating blows to ETA's leadership and structure (between May 2008 and April 2009 no less than four consecutive "military chiefs" were arrested).

ETA operated mainly in Spain, particularly in the Basque Country, Navarre, and (to a lesser degree) Madrid, Barcelona, and the tourist areas of the Spanish Mediterranean coast. To date, about 65% of ETA's killings were committed in the Basque Country, followed by Madrid with roughly 15%. Navarre and Catalonia also registered significant numbers. ETA cooperated with the Catalan nationalist movement, which had its own far-left separatist organization that based itself off ETA – Terra Lliure; Terra Lliure was ultimately less successful and also avoided violent actions – excluding deaths amongst its members, Terra Lliure only had a single, accidental victim.

Actions in France usually consisted of assaults on arsenals or military industries to steal weapons or explosives; these were usually stored in large quantities in hide-outs located in the French Basque Country rather than Spain. The French judge Laurence Le Vert was threatened by ETA and a plot arguably aiming to assassinate her was unveiled. Only very rarely have ETA members engaged in shootings with the French Gendarmerie. This often occurred mainly when members of the group were confronted at checkpoints.

Despite this, on 1 December 2007 ETA killed two Spanish Civil Guards on counter-terrorist surveillance duties in Capbreton, Landes, France. This was its first killing after it ended its 2006 declaration of "permanent ceasefire" and the first killing committed by ETA in France of a Spanish police agent since 1976, when they kidnapped and assassinated two Spanish inspectors in Hendaye.

=== Financing ===
In 2007, police reports pointed out that, after the serious blows suffered by ETA and its political counterparts during the 2000s, its budget would have been adjusted to €2,000,000 annually.

Although ETA used robbery as a means of financing its activities in its early days, extortion represented ETA's main source of funds from the 1970s onwards, while it has also been accused both of arms trafficking and of embezzling funds from schools run by its political counterpart, Batasuna.

== Basque nationalist context ==
ETA was considered to form part of what is informally known as the Basque National Liberation Movement, a movement born much after ETA's creation. This loose term refers to a range of political organizations that are ideologically similar, comprising several distinct organizations that promote a type of leftist Basque nationalism that is often referred to by the Basque-language term Ezker Abertzalea (Nationalist Left). Other groups typically considered to belong to this independentist movement are the political party Batasuna, the nationalist youth organization Segi, the labour union Langile Abertzaleen Batzordeak (LAB), and Askatasuna among others. There are often strong interconnections between these groups, double or even triple membership are not infrequent.

There are Basque nationalist parties with similar goals as those of ETA (namely, independence) but who reject their violent means. They are: EH Bildu, EAJ-PNV, Eusko Alkartasuna, Aralar and, in the French Basque country, Abertzaleen Batasuna. Also, many left-wing parties, such as Ezker Batua, Batzarre and some sectors of the EAJ-PNV party, also support self-determination but are not in favour of independence.

== French role ==
Historically, members of ETA took refuge in France, particularly the French Basque Country. The leadership typically chose to live in France for security reasons, where police pressure was much less than in Spain. Accordingly, ETA's tactical approach had been to downplay the issue of independence of the French Basque country so as to get French acquiescence for their activities. The French government quietly tolerated the group, especially during Franco's regime, when ETA members could face the death penalty in Spain. In the 1980s, the advent of the GAL still hindered counter-terrorist cooperation between France and Spain, with the French government considering ETA a Spanish domestic problem. At the time, ETA members often travelled between the two countries using the French haven as a base of operations.

With the disbanding of the GAL, the French government changed its position on the matter and in the 1990s initiated the ongoing period of active cooperation with the Spanish government against ETA, including fast-track transfers of detainees to Spanish tribunals that are regarded as fully compliant with European Union legislation on human rights and the legal representation of detainees. Virtually all of the highest ranks within ETA –including their successive "military", "political" or finances chiefs – have been captured in French territory, from where they had been plotting their activities after having crossed the border from Spain.

In response to the new situation, ETA carried out attacks against French policemen and made threats to some French judges and prosecutors. This implied a change from the group's previous low-profile in the French Basque Country, which successive ETA leaders had used to discreetly manage their activities in Spain.

== Government response ==
ETA considered its prisoners political prisoners. Until 2003, ETA consequently forbade them to ask penal authorities for progression to tercer grado (a form of open prison that allows single-day or weekend furloughs) or parole. Before that date, those who did so were menaced and expelled from the group. Some were assassinated by ETA for leaving the group and going through reinsertion programs.

The Spanish Government passed the Ley de Partidos Políticos. This is a law barring political parties that support violence and do not condemn terrorist actions or are involved with terrorist groups. The law resulted in the banning of Herri Batasuna and its successor parties unless they explicitly condemned terrorist actions and, at times, imprisoning or trying some of its leaders who have been indicted for cooperation with ETA.

Judge Baltasar Garzón initiated a judicial procedure (coded as 18/98), aimed towards the support structure of ETA. This procedure started in 1998 with the preventive closure of the newspaper Egin (and its associated radio-station Egin Irratia), accused of being linked to ETA, and temporary imprisoning the editor of its "investigative unit", Pepe Rei, under similar accusations. In August 1999 Judge Baltasar Garzón authorized the reopening of the newspaper and the radio, but they could not reopen due to economic difficulties.

Judicial procedure 18/98 has many ramifications, including the following:

- A trial against a little-known organization called Xaki, acquitted in 2001 as the "international network" of ETA.
- A trial against the youths' movement Jarrai–Haika–Segi, accused of contributing to street violence in an organized form and connivance with ETA.
- Another trial against Pepe Rei and his new investigation magazine Ardi Beltza (Black Sheep). The magazine was also closed down.
- A trial against the political organization Ekin (Action), accused of promoting civil disobedience.
- A trial against the organization Joxemi Zumalabe Fundazioa, which was once again accused of promoting civil disobedience.
- A trial against the prisoner support movement Amnistiaren Aldeko Komiteak.
- A trial against Batasuna and the Herriko Tabernak (people's taverns), accused of acting as a network of meeting centres for members and supporters of ETA. Batasuna was outlawed in all forms. Most taverns continue working normally as their ownership is not directly linked to Batasuna.
- A trial against the league of Basque-language academies Alfabetatze Euskalduntze Koordinakundea (AEK). The case was dropped in 2001.
- Another trial against Ekin, accusing Iker Casnova of managing the finances of ETA.
- A trial against the association of Basque municipalities Udalbiltza.
- The closing of the newspaper Euskaldunon Egunkaria in 2003 and the imprisonment and trial of its editor, Martxelo Otamendi, due to links with ETA accounting and fundraising, and other journalists (some of whom reported torture).

In 2007, indicted members of the youth movements Haika, Segi and Jarrai were found guilty of a crime of connivance with terrorism.

In May 2008, leading ETA figures were arrested in Bordeaux, France. Francisco Javier López Peña, also known as 'Thierry,' had been on the run for twenty years before his arrest. A final total of arrests brought in six people, including ETA members and supporters, including the ex-Mayor of Andoain, José Antonio Barandiarán, who is rumoured to have led police to 'Thierry'. The Spanish Interior Ministry claimed the relevance of the arrests would come in time with the investigation. Furthermore, the Interior Minister said that those members of ETA now arrested had ordered the latest attacks and that senior ETA member Francisco Javier López Peña was "not just another arrest because he is, in all probability, the man who has most political and military weight in the terrorist group."

After Lopez Pena's arrest, along with the Basque referendum being put on hold, police work has been on the rise. On 22 July 2008, Spanish police dismantled the most active cell of ETA by detaining nine suspected members of the group. Interior Minister Alfredo Perez Rubalcaba said about the arrests: "We can't say this is the only ETA unit but it was the most active, most dynamic and of course the most wanted one." Four days later French police also arrested two suspects believed to be tied to the same active cell. The two suspects were: Asier Eceiza, considered a top aide to a senior ETA operative still sought by police, and Olga Comes, whom authorities have linked to the ETA suspects.

=== International response ===
The European Union and the United States listed ETA as a terrorist group in their relevant watch lists. ETA has been a Proscribed Organisation in the United Kingdom under the Terrorism Act 2000 since 29 March 2001. The Canadian Parliament listed ETA as a terrorist group in 2003.

France and Spain have often shown co-operation in the fight against ETA, after France's lack of co-operation during the Franco era. In late 2007, two Spanish guards were shot to death in France when on a joint operation with their French counterparts. Furthermore, in May 2008, the arrests of four people in Bordeaux led to a breakthrough against ETA, according to the Spanish Interior Ministry.

In 2008, as ETA activity increased, France increased its pressure on ETA by arresting more ETA suspects, including Unai Fano, María Lizarraga, and Esteban Murillo Zubiri in Bidarrain. He had been wanted by the Spanish authorities since 2007 when a Europol arrest warrant was issued against him. French judicial authorities had already ordered that he be held in prison on remand.

Spain has also sought cooperation from the United Kingdom in dealing with ETA-IRA ties. In 2008, this came to light after Iñaki de Juana Chaos, whose release from prison was cancelled on appeal, had moved to Belfast. He was thought to be staying at an IRA safe house while being sought by the Spanish authorities. Interpol notified the judge, Eloy Velasco, that he was in either the Republic of Ireland or Northern Ireland.

== Other related armed groups ==
=== Disbanded violent groups ===
- Anti-ETA groups:
  - Acción Nacional Española
  - ATE (Anti-Terrorismo ETA)
  - Batallón Vasco Español
  - Grupos Antiterroristas de Liberación (GAL)
  - Guerrilleros de Cristo Rey
- Minor Basque nationalist and radical left-wing groups:
  - Iparretarrak
  - Iraultza
  - Comandos Autónomos Anticapitalistas
  - Euskal Zuzentasuna
  - Hordago
  - Irrintzi

=== International links ===
- ETA was known to have had 'fraternal' contacts with the Provisional Irish Republican Army; the two groups have both, at times, characterized their struggles as parallel. Links between the two groups go back to at least March 1974. ETA purchased Strela 2 surface-to-air missiles from the IRA and in 2001 unsuccessfully attempted to shoot down a jet carrying the Spanish Prime Minister, José María Aznar. IRA member Maria McGuire stated the IRA received fifty revolvers from ETA in exchange for explosives training.
- In the late 1960s, the Portuguese group Liga de Unidade e Ação Revolucionária (LUAR), which was fighting the dictatorship, brokered the contacts that allowed ETA to purchase weapons in the then Czechoslovak Republic. The partnership continued as LUAR would later assign part of the stolen passports on Portugal consulted in Rotterdam and Luxembourg, in 1971. These were used by ETA in the Ogro operation that resulted in the assassination of Prime Minister, Admiral Carrero Blanco. Later, in 1981, when Portugal and Spain were living already in full democracy, ETA exchanged weapons, explosives and provided logistical support to the Forças Populares 25 de Abril (FP-25), a Portuguese far-left terrorist group. In 1981, FP-25 received Gama 2 explosives and two dozen FireBird pistols in exchange for G3 machine guns. Additionally, ETA came to harbor, in the Basque Country, two FP-25 terrorists who needed to retreat.
- ETA acquired weapons from Carlos the Jackal (Ilich Ramírez Sánchez) in the early 1980s.
- In 1999 ETA militants teamed up with the (now self-dissolved) Breton Revolutionary Army to steal explosives from magazines in Brittany.
- ETA had extensive ties with the Breton Liberation Front – both organizations shared intelligence, and Breton revolutionaries received training from ETA in the Basque movement's clandestine camps in the Pyrenees. Both organizations also published a joint declaration opposing the expansion of the European Economic Community and condemning the European Union as exploitative and bourgeois; the declaration also stated: "The fight against imperialism and colonialism in the Western European subcontinent calls for determined and fundamental opposition to the Common Market. The national oppression and economic exploitation suffered by the Irish, Basque, and Breton people can do nothing in effect but worsen by the development of this vast and dangerous capitalist enterprise."
- ETA received funding and weapons from associates of Radovan Karadzic within the Republika Srpska, in the aftermath of the Yugoslav Wars.
- A Catalan revolutionary organization that based itself off ETA, Terra Lliure, was an ally of ETA, and both organizations coordinated their actions and supported each other.
- The Colombian government stated that there are contacts between ETA and the Colombian guerrillas FARC. The recent capture of FARC's leaders' computers, and leaked email exchanges between both groups, show that ETA members received training from FARC. Apparently, FARC asked for help from ETA to conduct future attacks in Spain, but the Anncol news agency later denied it, clarifying that the Spanish capital Madrid had been confused with a city in northern Colombia also named Madrid. Following a judicial investigation, it was reported that FARC and ETA had held meetings in Colombia, exchanging information about combat tactics and methods of activating explosives through mobile phones. The two organizations were said to have met at least three times. One of the meetings involved two ETA representatives and two FARC leaders, at a FARC camp, and lasted for a week in 2003. FARC also offered to hide ETA fugitives while requesting anti-air missiles, as well as asking ETA to supply medical experts who could work at FARC prison camps for more than a year. Besides, and more controversially, FARC also asked ETA to stage attacks and kidnappings on its behalf in Europe.
  - Italian author and mafia specialist Roberto Saviano pointed to a relationship of the group with the Mafia. According to this view, ETA trafficked cocaine which it got via its FARC contacts, then traded it with the Mafia for guns.
- Several ex-militants were sent from France through Panama to reside in Cuba after an agreement of the Spanish government (under Felipe González) with Cuba. The United States Department of State has no information on their activities on Cuban territory.
- Mapuche groups in the Argentine province of Neuquén have been accused of being trained by both ETA and FARC. Local Mapuches have classified the rumours as part of a plot by businessmen and other Argentines. The United States diplomatic cables leak showed the government of Michelle Bachelet had asked the United States aid in investigating a possible FARC-ETA-Mapuche link.

== In the media ==
=== Films ===
==== Documentary films ====
- Asesinato en febrero, about the families of Basque politician Fernando Buesa and his bodyguard, both killed by ETA.
- The Basque Ball: The Skin Against the Stone, (La Pelota Vasca, 2003) about the Basque conflict by filmmaker Julio Medem: interviews about Basque nationalism and politics. Includes testimonials of ETA victims and relatives of ETA prisoners.
- Perseguidos, where Eterio Ortega and Elías Querejeta interview local councilors threatened by ETA.
- Trece entre mil, the testimony of some of ETA's victims in the last 30 years by filmmaker Iñaki Arteta.
- 48 horas, about the kidnapping of Miguel Angel Blanco and his murder.
- ETA. Une histoire basque, about the history of ETA.
- Chronique Basque, about a Basque politician who is the target of an ETA death threat.
- Asier ETA biok (Asier and/ETA I, 2013), where filmmaker Aitor Merino explores his relation with his childhood friend Asier Aranguren, who had become an ETA member.
- El fin de ETA, a documentary about the history of ETA.

==== Other fact-based films about ETA ====
- Commando Txikia (José Luis Madrid, 1977)
- Operación Ogro (Operation Ogre, 1979), Gillo Pontecorvo's film about the assassination of Luis Carrero Blanco.
- El proceso de Burgos ("The Burgos Trial", Imanol Uribe, 1979)
- Escape from Segovia (1981), about the Segovia prison break when ETA prisoners escaped from Segovia prison.
- Proceso a ETA ("The Trial of ETA", Manuel Macià, 1988)
- Yoyes, María Dolores Katarain, also known as "Yoyes", tries to leave ETA and is killed by her former comrades.
- El lobo, based on the life of Mikel Lejarza, who, prompted by the Spanish police, entered ETA to be a double agent.
- Munich (2005), where the squad of Israeli operatives pretend to be members of ETA to avoid conflict with a squad of PLO operatives whilst sharing a neutral safe house.
- GAL, about the journalistic research leading to the uncovering of the state-supported GAL.
- Tiro en la Cabeza (2008) ("A bullet in the head"), about the life of an ETA member the day he will kill two Spanish Policemen in Capbreton, France.
- Una Bala Para el Rey ("A Bullet for the King", March 2009) about ETA's failed plot to murder Juan Carlos I during his holidays in Mallorca in 1995.
- Maixabel (2021) about the meetings between Maixabel Lasa, widow of an assassinated politician, and the repenting assassins.

==== Fictional films featuring ETA members and actions ====
- El caso Almería ("The Almería Case", Pedro Costa Musté, 1983)
- La Muerte de Mikel ("The Death of Mikel", Imanol Uribe, 1983)
- it:Goma 2 (José Antonio de la Loma, 1984)
- Ander y Yul ("Ander and Yul", Ana Díez, 1988)
- Días de humo ("Days of Smoke", Antton Eceiza, 1989)
- Sombras en una batalla ("Shadows in a Battle", Mario Camus, 1993)
- Días contados ("Counted Days", Imanol Uribe, 1994)
- "A ciegas (Blinded)", Daniel Calparsoro, 1997)
- The Jackal (Michael Caton-Jones, 1997)
- El viaje de Arián ("Arián's Voyage", Eduard Bosch, 2001)
- La voz de su amo ("His Master's Voice", Emilio Martínez Lázaro, 2001)
- Esos cielos ("Those skies", Aitzpea Goenaga, 2006)
- Todos estamos invitados ("We are all invited", Manuel Gutiérrez Aragón, 2008)
- Casa de mi padre ("My Father's House", Gorka Merchán, 2008)
- Celda 211 ("Cell 211", Daniel Monzón, 2009)
- Carlos (Olivier Assayas, 2010)
- Bomb Scared (Borga Cabeaga, 2017)
- Patria ("Fatherland", Aitor Gabilondo, 2020). Based on the novel Patria (Fernando Aramburu, 2016) fictional, but based on the social conflict between families of ETA members and families of the victims.
- La Infiltrada ("Undercover", Arantxa Echevarría, 2025)

=== Novels ===
- The Sands of Time (Sidney Sheldon, 1988) ISBN 978-0-446-35683-1
- The Fish of Bitterness (Los peces de la amargura) in Spanish (Fernando Aramburu, 2006) ISBN 978-8483835463
- The Spanish Game (Charles Cumming, 2006) ISBN 9780718147266
- A Basque Story (M. Bryce Ternet, 2009) ISBN 9781448955886
- Fatherland (Patria) in Spanish (Fernando Aramburu, 2016) ISBN 9788490663196
- The Absent (Los Ausentes) in Spanish (Juana Cortés Amunarriz, 2021) ISBN 9788467061277

== See also ==
- Etxerat
- José Larrañaga Arenas
- Felix Likiniano
- Julen Madariaga
- Kasilda Hernáez
