= Belloc Abbey =

Abbey in Pyrénées-Atlantiques, France

Coordinates: 43°50′23″N 1°29′16″E

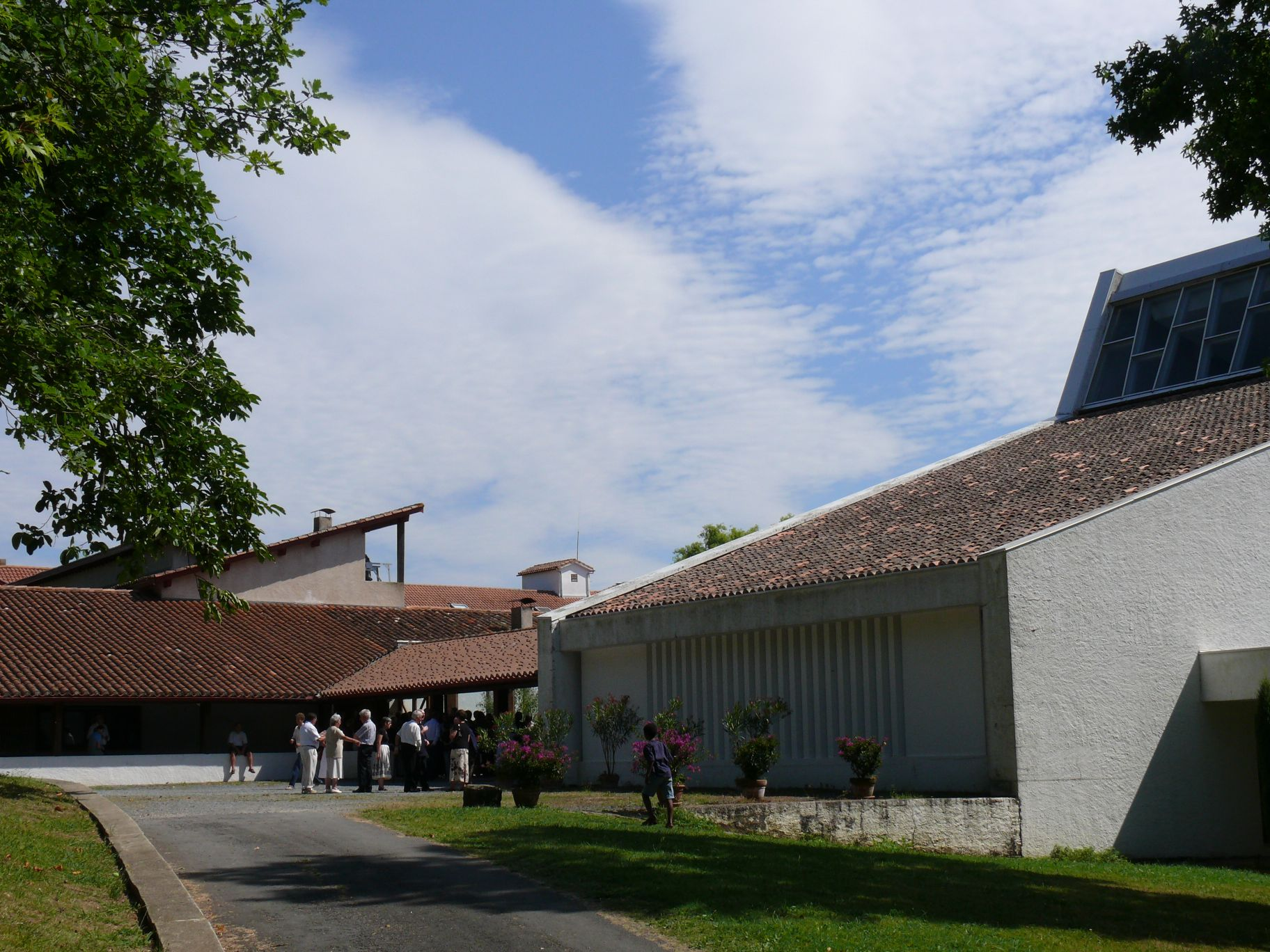
The abbey

Belloc Abbey, otherwise the Abbey of Notre-Dame de Belloc (French: Abbaye de Belloc, Abbaye Notre-Dame de Belloc), is a Benedictine monastery located in Urt, in the Pyrénées-Atlantiques. It was founded in 1875.

== Description ==
The community, which comprises about 40 monks, follows the Rule of St. Benedict and belongs to the Subiaco Cassinese Congregation. The brothers offer the hospitality of their house to men, households and groups requiring silence or spiritual guidance.

To support themselves they principally make the ewes' milk cheese Abbaye de Belloc. Among other activities they also undertake illumination and calligraphy and run a bookshop open to the public.

== Images ==
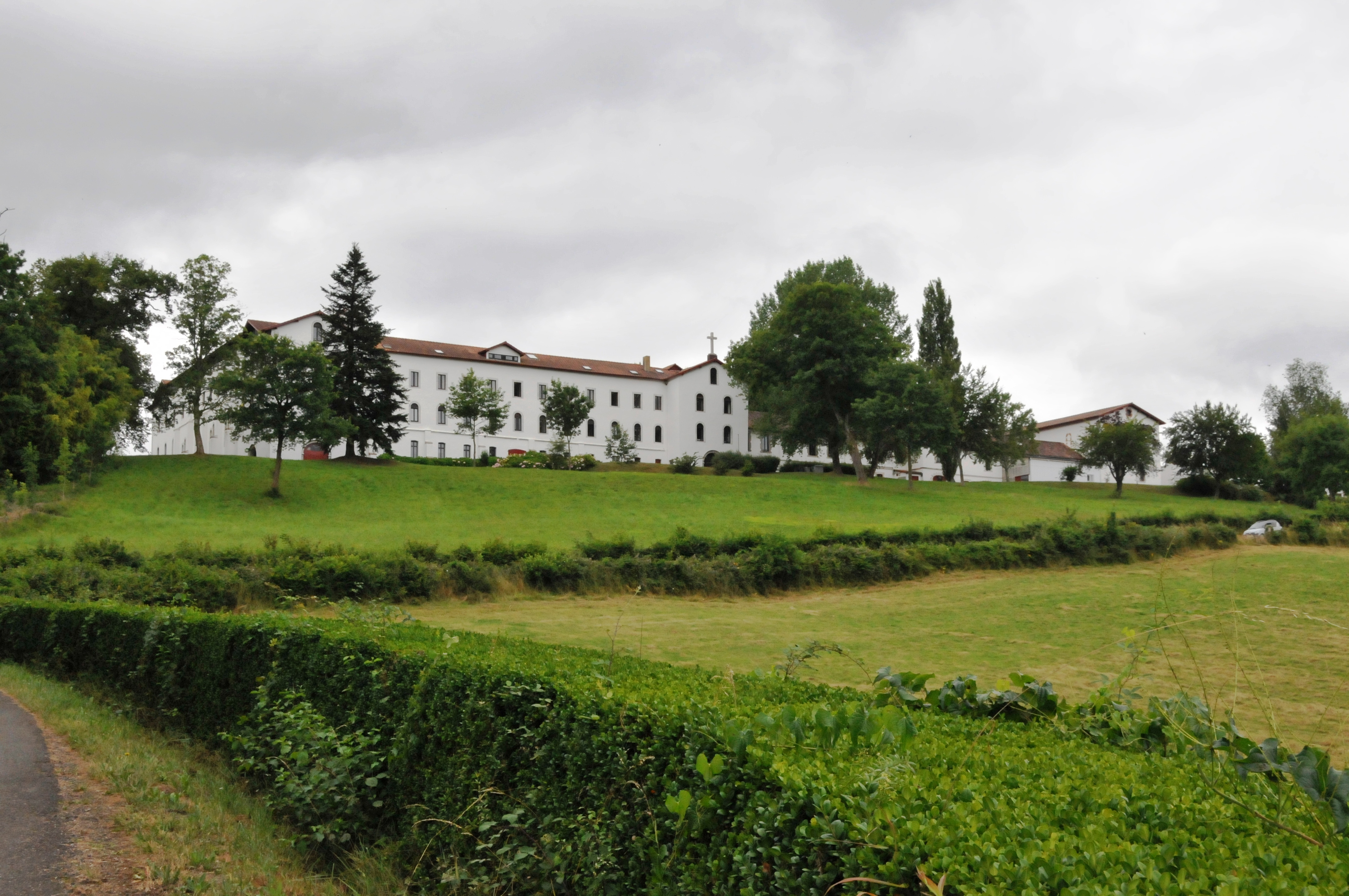
Principal building

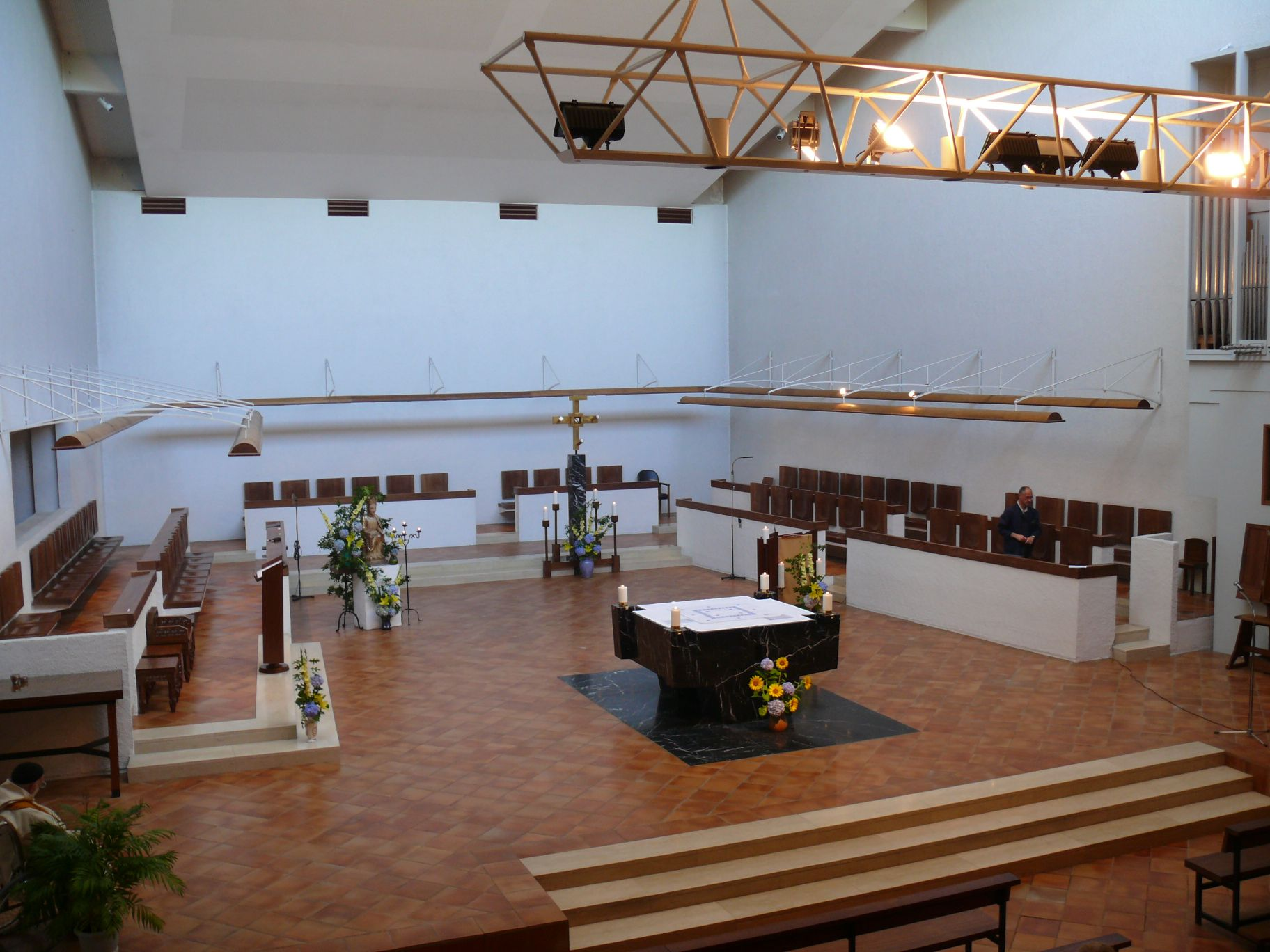
Church

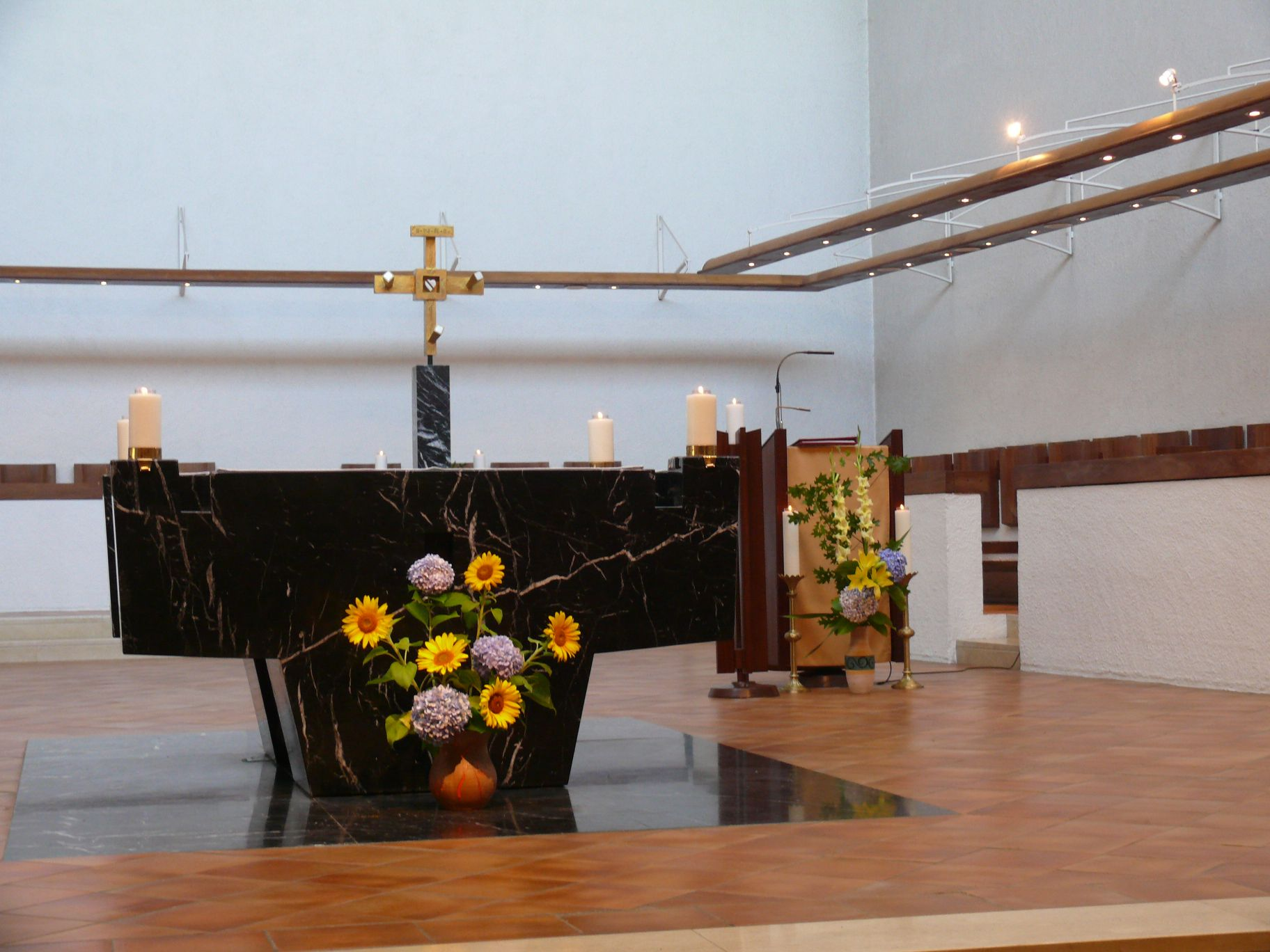
Altar

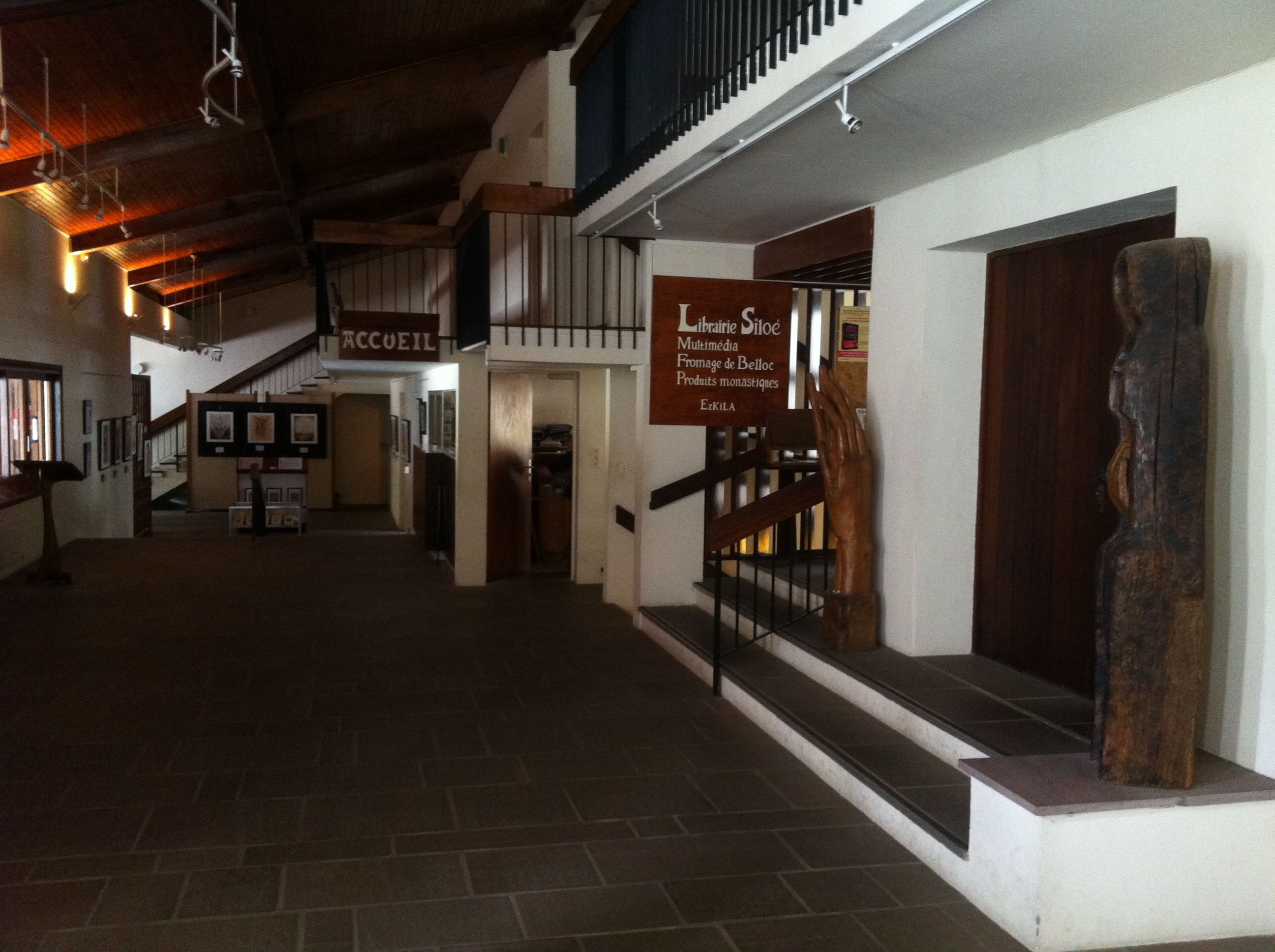
Reception area

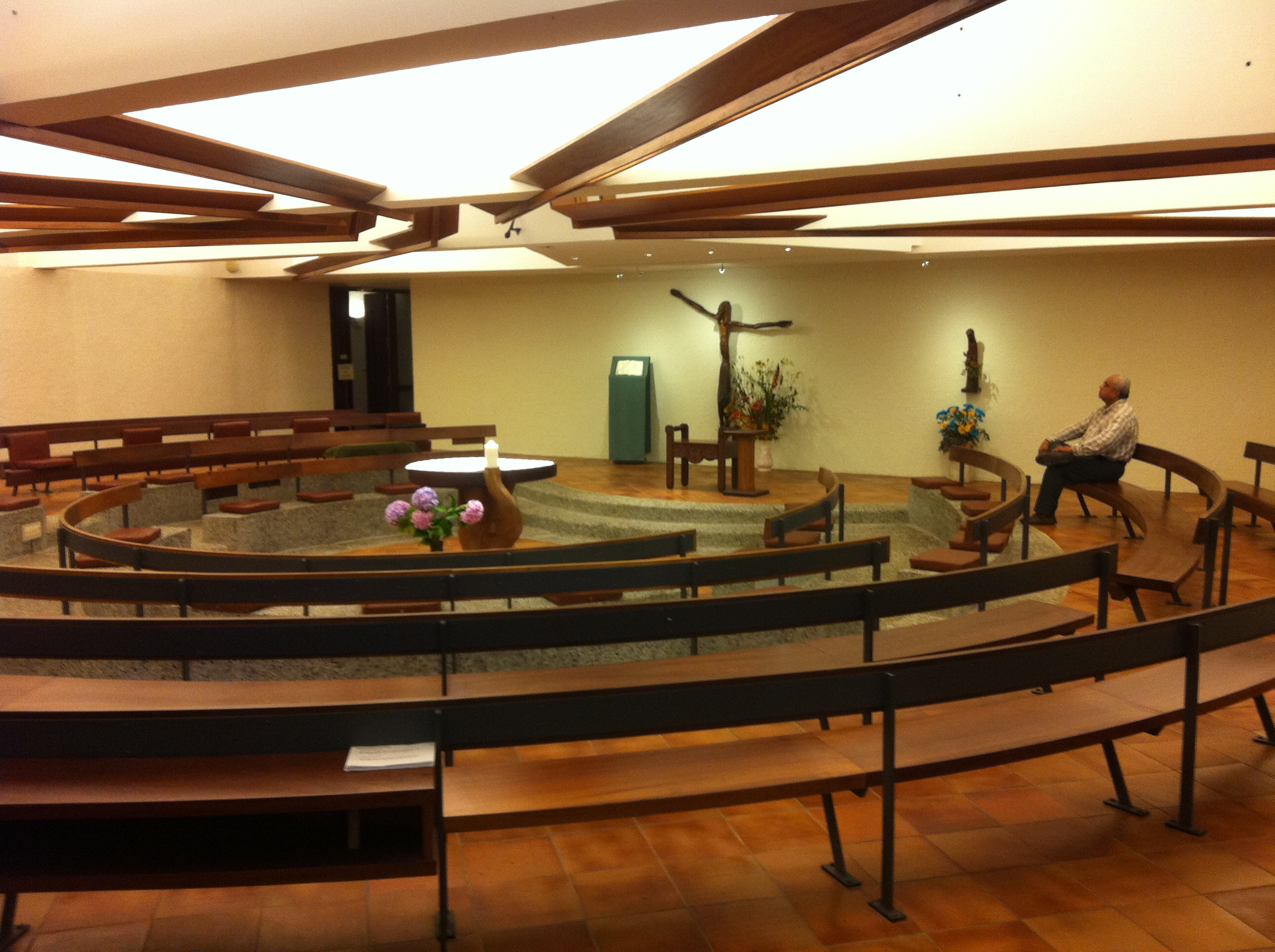
Oratory in the crypt

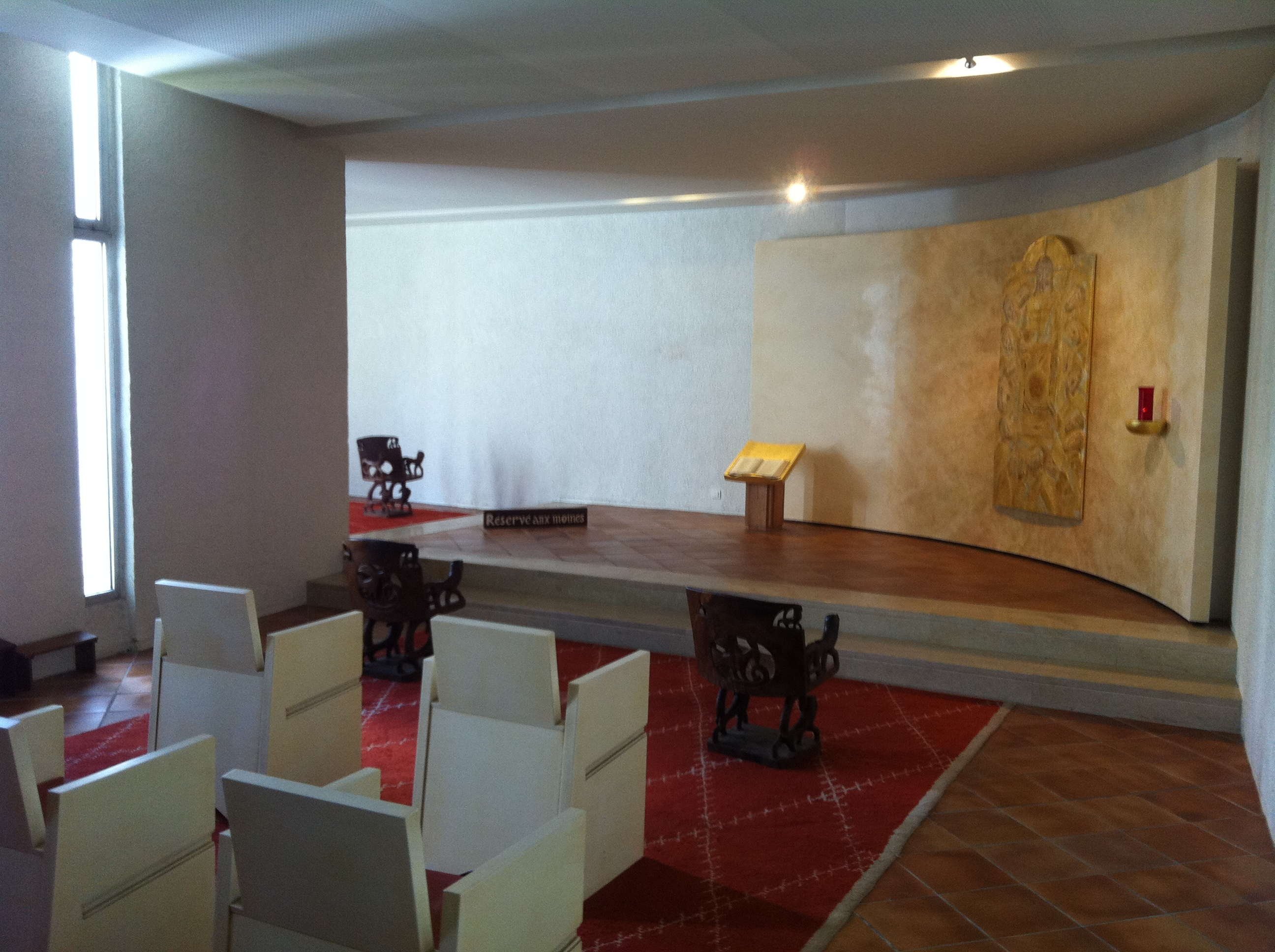
Chapelle du St-Sacrement

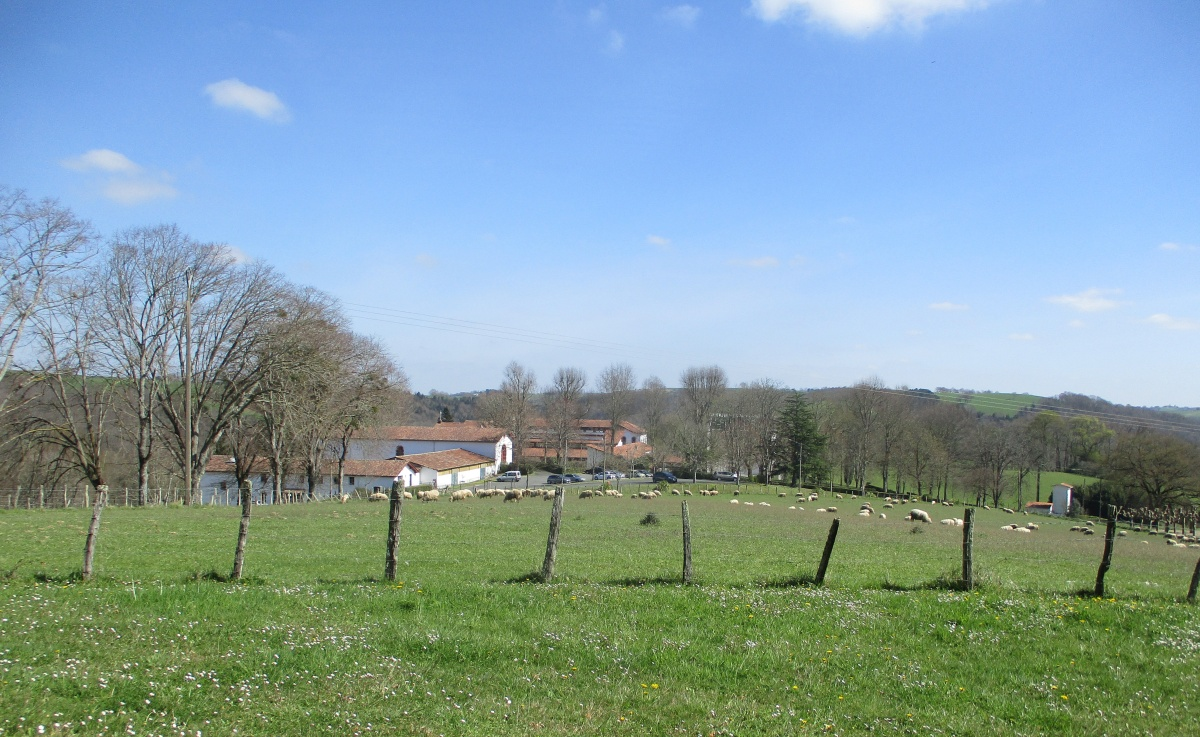
Belloc Abbey from the west

== See also ==
- First Assembly of ETA

== Bibliography ==
- Marc Doucet (preface by Mgr. Dagens), 2009: Des hommes travaillés par Dieu: Histoire de l'Abbaye de Belloc, Paris, éditions du Cerf
