= Julen Madariaga =

Spanish co-founder of ETA (1932–2021)

- Born: 11 October 1932; Bilbao, Spain
- Died: 6 April 2021 (aged 88); Saint-Pée-sur-Nivelle, France
- Occupations: Politician and lawyer
- Known for: Co-founded the Basque armed group ETA

Julen Kerman Madariaga Agirre (11 October 1932 – 6 April 2021) was a Spanish Basque politician and lawyer who co-founded the Basque armed group ETA in 1959 together with José María Benito del Valle, Rafael Albisu and Txillardegi.

== Biography ==
Madariaga was born in Bilbao on 11 October 1932. He accompanied his father, a militant of the Basque Nationalist Party, to exile in Chile during the Spanish Civil War. He returned to Bilbao in 1942. After high school, he studied law in the United Kingdom, earning a doctorate in University of Cambridge, after which he returned to the Basque Country and embarked on nationalist political activity.

He was one of the founders of "Ekin" in the early 1950s, a splinter organization of the Basque Nationalist Party youth that was the embryo of the future Euskadi Ta Askatasuna (ETA). This was created in 1959 and, three years later, Madariaga participated in Bayonne in the I Assembly of the organization. He was since then one of the members of its executive committee. Madariaga was indicted in the Burgos trial and declared in absentia.

He was a leader of ETA, a prominent member of Herri Batasuna and, later, founder of the political party Aralar and was close to the pacifist organization, Elkarri.

Madariaga served long prison sentences and spent years in exile, but severed his links with ETA in 1989 after becoming disillusioned with the group's methods. He left Herri Batasuna in 1995 after the coalition refused to condemn ETA violence.

In June 2006, he was arrested in France on charges of extorting businessmen into making financial contributions to ETA. However, the charges were dropped and he was released within days.

== Death ==
He died on 6 April 2021 at the age of 88 from a long illness.

== Sources ==
- "Spanish hold vigils urging Eta not to break terror ceasefire", The Independent, December 4, 1999
- "ETA may call for end to violence". AP, March 25, 2004
- "From Belfast to Bilbao". Guardian, April 19, 2006
- "Spain announces peace talks with ETA". AP, June 29, 2006
- Baskenland Informatie Centrum newsletter, June 2006
