= Zutik (publication) =

See Zutik for the current Basque leftist party.

Zutik (Stand Up in Basque) was the internal organ of the Basque clandestine terrorist organization ETA. It was founded in 1961.

The current organ of ETA is named Zutabe (Pillar).
