= Iberian Revolutionary Liberation Directorate =

Armed organization in Portugal and Spain

Iberian Revolutionary Liberation Directorate Directorio Revolucionario Ibérico de Liberación Directório Revolucionário Ibérico de Libertação
- Leaders: Humberto Delgado; Xosé Velo Mosquera
- Dates active: 1958–1964
- Active regions: Portugal and Spain
- Ideology: Antifascism; Republicanism
- Status: Dissolved

The Iberian Revolutionary Liberation Directorate (DRIL; Directorio Revolucionario Ibérico de Liberación in Spanish and Galician language or Directório Revolucionário Ibérico de Libertação in Portuguese) was an armed organization that operated from 1958 to 1964, formed by Spaniards (mainly Galicians) and Portuguese opponents of the Iberian dictatorships. (Note: The dictators being António de Oliveira Salazar in Portugal and Francisco Franco in Spain.) The organization had two general secretaries, the Portuguese, Humberto Delgado and, the Galician, Xosé Velo Mosquera.

== History ==
The first action of the DRIL was in February 1960, consisting of several bomb attacks in Madrid. A member of the DRIL, José Ramón Pérez Jurado, died during this action due to the explosion of one of the artifacts. His companion Antonio Abad Donoso was arrested and, although none of the explosions produced any victims, was sentenced to death and executed on 8 March of the same year.

The most famous action of the DRIL was the Santa Maria hijacking, in 1961. DRIL militants seized control of Santa Maria, a 609-foot-long (186 m), 20,900-ton Portuguese luxury cruise liner. After talks with the Brazilian government, led by Jânio Quadros, DRIL members laid down their guns and drove the ship to Recife in exchange for receiving political refugee status. The ship was returned to its owners of the Portuguese Company Colonial de Navegação.

The organization continued to carry sporadic attacks between 1961 and 1964, when the organization dissolved.
