= European Association of Daily Newspapers in Minority and Regional Languages =

European Association of Daily Newspapers in Minority and Regional Languages (MIDAS)
- Abbreviation: MIDAS
- Formation: 2001; 25 years ago
- Founded at: Bozen, South Tyrol, Italy
- Type: Non-profit association for minority daily press
- Headquarters: European Academy (Eurac Research), Bozen, South Tyrol, Italy
- Coordinates: 46°29′40.7″N 11°20′45″E
- Members: 28 (2021)
- Official language: English, German
- President: Martxelo Otamendi
- Board of directors: General Secretary
- Key people: Marc Röggla
- Main organ: Governing Board
- Website: www.midas-press.org

The European Association of Daily Newspapers in Minority and Regional Languages, also known as Minority Dailies Association (MIDAS), is a politically independent, non-profit association for minority daily press with headquarters at the Center for Autonomy Experience at Eurac Research in Bulsan/Bozen/Bolzano, South Tyrol, Italy.

MIDAS was formed in the year 2001 by editors-in-chief from more than 10 language communities throughout Europe in order to coordinate their strategies and to stimulate cooperation in the areas of information exchange, printing, and marketing; to organise campaigns to promote publications in minority languages; and to obtain support from state and EU institutions for minority languages and their print media.

Annually, MIDAS organises the MIDAS Training Programme, offering two young journalists or media professionals (up to the age of 40) the opportunity to undertake a one- to two-week training placement at another MIDAS member outlet.

MIDAS awards also the MIDAS and Otto von Habsburg prizes to the journalists of minority and majority press. The judging criteria for the prizes are high journalistic quality and coverage of topics related to minority protection, European integration and promotion of cultural diversity.

28 newspapers from Croatia, Czech Republic, Denmark, Finland, Germany, Italy, Serbia, Lithuania, Romania, Slovakia, Spain and Switzerland have already joined MIDAS, and the organization continues to grow. MIDAS member newspapers reach more than 3 million European citizens as readers and are published in 11 languages. MIDAS has carried out EU projects such as Citoyen and NewsSpectrum.

In 2019 Catalan web portal VilaWeb was admitted as a new member of MIDAS, becoming the first fully online media outlet to become a member of the association. However, following the switch to an online-only format of Der Nordschleswiger, MIDAS has taken a broader approach to its members.

The current president of MIDAS is Martxelo Otamendi, the former editor-in-chief of Basque language newspaper Berria, who was elected in 2025.

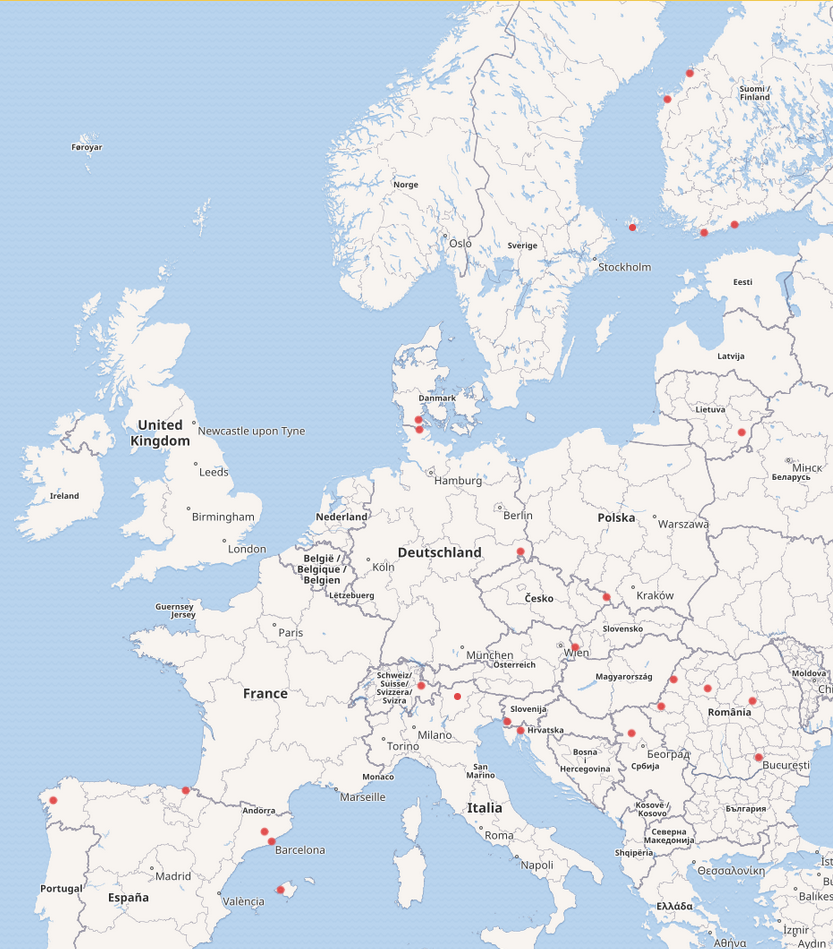
Members of MIDAS.

== Members ==
Country	Minority/Language	Newspaper
Croatia	Italians	La Voce del Popolo
Czech Republic	Poles	Głos
Denmark	Germans	Der Nordschleswiger
Finland	Swedes	Åbo Underrättelser
Finland	Swedes	Ålandstidningen
Finland	Swedes	Hufvudstadsbladet
Finland	Swedes	Österbottens Tidning
Finland	Swedes	Vasabladet
Finland	Swedes	Västra Nyland
Germany	Danes	Flensborg Avis
Germany	Sorbs	Serbske Nowiny
Italy	South Tyroleans	Dolomiten
Italy	South Tyroleans	Neue Südtiroler Tageszeitung
Italy	Slovenes	Primorski dnevnik
Italy	Ladins	La Usc di Ladins
Lithuania	Poles	Kurier Wileński
Romania	Germans	Allgemeine Deutsche Zeitung für Rumänien
Romania	Hungarians	Bihari Napló
Romania	Hungarians	Szabadság
Romania	Hungarians	Hargita Népe
Romania	Hungarians	Nyugati Jelen
Serbia	Hungarians	Magyar Szó
Slovakia	Hungarians	Új Szó
Spain	Catalans	Diari de Balears
Spain	Catalans	Regió7
Spain	Catalans	VilaWeb
Spain	Basques	Berria
Spain	Galician	Nós Diario
Switzerland	Romansh language	La Quotidiana

Source: http://www.midas-press.org/home/members/

== Awards ==
=== MIDAS Prize for Journalism in Minority Protection and Cultural Diversity in Europe ===
==== Winners ====
Year	Winner	Newspaper
2004	Ainara Mendiola	Berria
2005	Björn Mansson	Hufvudstadsbladet
2006	Jan Diedrichsen	Der Nordschleswiger
2007	Hatto Schmidt	Dolomiten
2008	Jens Nygaard	Flensborg Avis
2009	Salvador Cardus	Avui; La Vanguardia
2010	Örs Szeghalmi	Bihari Napló
2011	Jeanette Björkqvist	Hufvudstadsbladet
2012	Mária Vrabec	Új Szó
2013	Christine Chiriac	Allgemeine Deutsche Zeitung für Rumänien
2014	Dolors Altarriba	El 9 Nou
2015	Ina Grønvig; Lise B. Christoffersen; Eyla Both	Flensborg Avis
2016	Adelaida Ivan	Allgemeine Deutsche Zeitung für Rumänien
2017	Sandor Tence	Primorski dnevnik
2018	István Páp	Bihari Napló
2019	Gabriel von Toggenburg	Dolomiten
2020	Emese Ibos	Új Szó
2021	Abel Gallardo Soto	Regiò7
2022	Kriszta Székely	Szabadság
2023	Gábor Czímer	Új Szó
2024	Ágnes Péter	Hargita Népe
2025	Urtzi Urkizu	Berria
2026	Miquel Spa Peradejordi	Regió7

Source: https://www.midas-press.org/midas-prize/laureates/

=== Otto von Habsburg Prize for Journalism in Minority Protection and Cultural Diversity in Europe ===
==== Winners ====
Year	Winner	Media	Type
2004	Reinhard Olt	Frankfurter Allgemeine Zeitung	Press
2005	Gian Antonio Stella	Corriere della Sera	Press
2006	Ivan Zsolt Nagy	Magyar Nemzet	Press
2007	Margaretha Kopeinig	Kurier	Press
2008	Marius Cosmeanu	Cotidianul	Press
2009	Marcin Wojciechowski	Gazeta Wyborcza	Press
2010	Štefan Hríb	.týždeň	Press
2011	Peter Meier-Bergfeld	Rheinischer Merkur	Press
2012	Constanze Letsch	The Guardian	Press
2013	Keno Verseck	Der Spiegel	Press
2014	Laure Equy	Libération	Press
2015	Inoslav Bešker	Jutarnji list	Press
2016	Editorial staff of broadcast Servus, Srečno, Ciao	ORF/ORF Kärnten (Carinthia)	Radio and TV
2017	Josep Maria Espinàs	El Periódico de Catalunya	Press
2018	Petra Sorge	Berliner Zeitung	Press
2019	Flensburger Tageblatt and JydskeVestkysten		Press
2020	Paolo Rumiz	La Repubblica	Press
2021	Katharina Brunner		
2022	Stephan Wabl	Wiener Zeitung / Der Standard	Press
2023	Journalists of Euskaldunon Egunkaria (Spain) and Andrzej Poczobut (Belarus)	Press	
2024	Marius Cosmeanu	Romania	Press
2025	Milan Rakovac	Croatia	Press
2026	Toni Visentini	Italy	Press

Source: https://www.midas-press.org/otto-von-habsburg-prize/laureates/
