= Primorski dnevnik =

Slovene newspaper in Italy

- Type: Daily newspaper
- Owner(s): Zadruga Primorski dnevnik, d.z.
- Publisher: Družba za založniške pobude, d.o.o.
- Editor: Igor Devetak
- Founded: 1945
- Political alignment: Left-wing
- Headquarters: Trieste, Gorizia
- Website: primorski.eu

Primorski dnevnik (English: The Littoral Daily), mostly known as Primorski, is a Slovene-language daily newspaper published in Trieste, Italy. It is the only Slovene daily in any country other than Slovenia, and one of the three historical daily newspapers in Italy published in a language other than Italian (the other two are the German-language Dolomiten and Neue Südtiroler Tageszeitung). It is primarily published for the Slovene minority in Italy.

== History ==
The newspaper was founded on 13 May 1945 in Trieste by the Yugoslav Partisans which occupied the city. It was founded as the main daily newspaper for the Yugoslav-occupied Slovenian Littoral, previously known as the Julian March. However, with the Yugoslav retreat from Trieste in early June 1945, and the establishment of the Free Territory of Trieste in September 1947, the newspaper became the herald of the Slovene community in Trieste and in other areas of the Friuli-Venezia Giulia region.

The legal predecessor of the Primorski dnevnik was the Partizanski dnevnik, published illegally during World War II. The Partizanski dnevnik was published between November 1943 and May 1945 by the Slovenian partisan resistance in the Slovenian Littoral, first in Cerkno and then in Gorenja Trebuša. After the liberation of Trieste by the Yugoslav Partisans on 1 May 1945, the headquarters was moved to Trieste, and its current name was adopted.

After the Soviet-Yugoslav split in 1948, Primorski dnevnik became the organ of the Titoist Italian-Slovenian Popular Front.

The newspaper centers its reporting on the Slovene community in Italy, but reports extensively also on news from Slovenia and the world. It frequently publishes articles relating to the Slovene minority in Carinthia and other minorities in Europe.

The newspaper is a member of MIDAS (European Association of Daily Newspapers in Minority and Regional Languages).
