= Der Nordschleswiger =

German-language regional online newspaper in Denmark

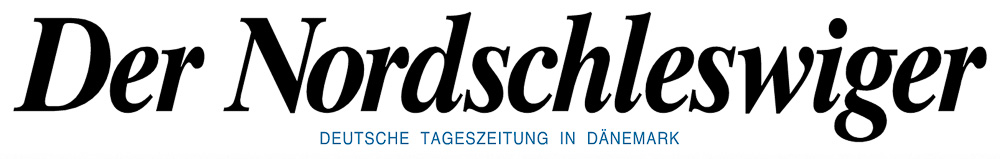
- Type: Online newspaper
- Publisher: Bund Deutscher Nordschleswiger
- Editor-in-chief: Gwyn Nissen
- Associate editor: Cornelius von Tiedemann
- Founded: 2 February 1946
- Ceased publication: 2018 (print)
- Language: German
- Headquarters: Aabenraa
- Country: Denmark
- Website: Der Nordschleswiger

Der Nordschleswiger is a German-language internet newspaper in Denmark with its main editorial office in Aabenraa and local editorial offices in Haderslev, Sønderborg, Tinglev and Tønder. The media house functions and sees itself as the mouthpiece of the German minority. It is one of two such major media outlets in the Danish-German border region, the other one being Flensborg Avis of the Danish minority in Germany. It was the first German-language paper established in Europe following World War II.

== History and profile ==
Der Nordschleswiger was founded as a weekly newspaper in 1946. Its first issue appeared on 2 February that year. In 1951 it became daily. The newspaper is published in German and had its own publishing house.

The newspaper is a member of MIDAS (European Association of Daily Newspapers in Minority and Regional Languages).

In 2013, the cooperation of the paper was expanded to include the largest Danish-language daily newspaper in southern Denmark, JydskeVestkysten. Since then, it has been possible for the four editorial offices to access the digital editorial systems of all partner editorial offices at any time. In addition, since 2014 the editorial offices of JydskeVestkysten and Der Nordschleswiger have been located in a joint media house in Aabenraa and the local editorial offices in Haderslev and Sønderborg are also housed in shared offices.

Der Nordschleswiger editorial office produces two German-language radio news programmes every weekday, which are broadcast terrestrially on Skala FM in Northern Schleswig and on the internet via various local stations from northern Schleswig-Holstein, among other places.

Major financial support for the paper comes from the German state through the BDN.

Since 2013 Gwyn Nissen has been the editor-in-chief of the paper. Cornelius von Tiedemann is its associate editor.

== Online newspaper ==
After votes in the minority, the publishing Bund Deutscher Nordschleswiger (BDN) main board decided in 2018 to discontinue the daily paper edition and to rely fully on the internet, which is particularly widespread in Denmark, for publishing. Since February 2021 all content can be viewed at any time free of charge, without payment barriers and subscription obligations on the website of Der Nordschleswiger and via apps for iOS and Android devices.

In addition, since the end of the printed daily newspaper in February 2021, there has been a fortnightly printed newspaper in cooperation with Flensborg Avis, in which content from the internet offering is collected.

In May 2021, Der Nordschleswiger was awarded a prize for the switch from print to digital by the umbrella organization of Danish media.
