= Bonn-Copenhagen declarations =

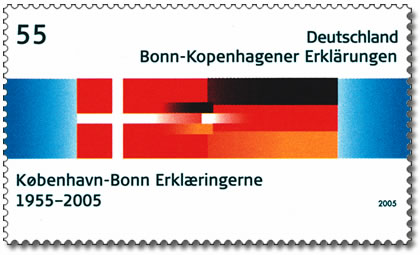
German stamp from 2005, commemorating the 50 year anniversary of the declarations. A similar stamp was issued in Denmark.

The Bonn-Copenhagen declarations are two separate, unilateral but similar declarations from Germany and Denmark issued in 1955 and recognizing the ethnic minorities in the two countries: the Danish minority in Germany and the German minority in Denmark, respectively.

Although the declarations are not binding according to international law, they were quickly implemented into national law by both countries.

The declarations establish that members of ethnic minorities have the same civil rights as other citizens of the country of residence and that issues relating to the minorities are internal matters for each of the two countries.

== Content of the declarations ==
The declarations consist of two documents:

- Negotiations of the German-Danish paper ended 28 March 1955. In this document both delegations grant schools of the other country's minority the right to conduct examinations. In addition, the German delegation announced that the Danish minority would be exempted from the 5% electoral threshold in elections to the Landtag of Schleswig-Holstein.
- The text of the actual declarations were published on 29 March 1955 and affirmed by the German and Danish Parliaments.

== Critique ==
The Bonn-Copenhagen model is often cited as an example to follow when it comes to resolving conflicts regarding ethnic minorities. However, the model is primarily relevant for reciprocal minorities living on either side of a national border. The model is less well suited to deal with border disputes and conflicts relating to sovereignty over territory. Both countries are furthermore required to be democratic and cooperative.

Today the declarations are by themselves considered inadequate and superseded by other legal instruments, such as the more comprehensive Framework Convention for the Protection of National Minorities by the Council of Europe.
