= Vicent Partal =

Valencian journalist

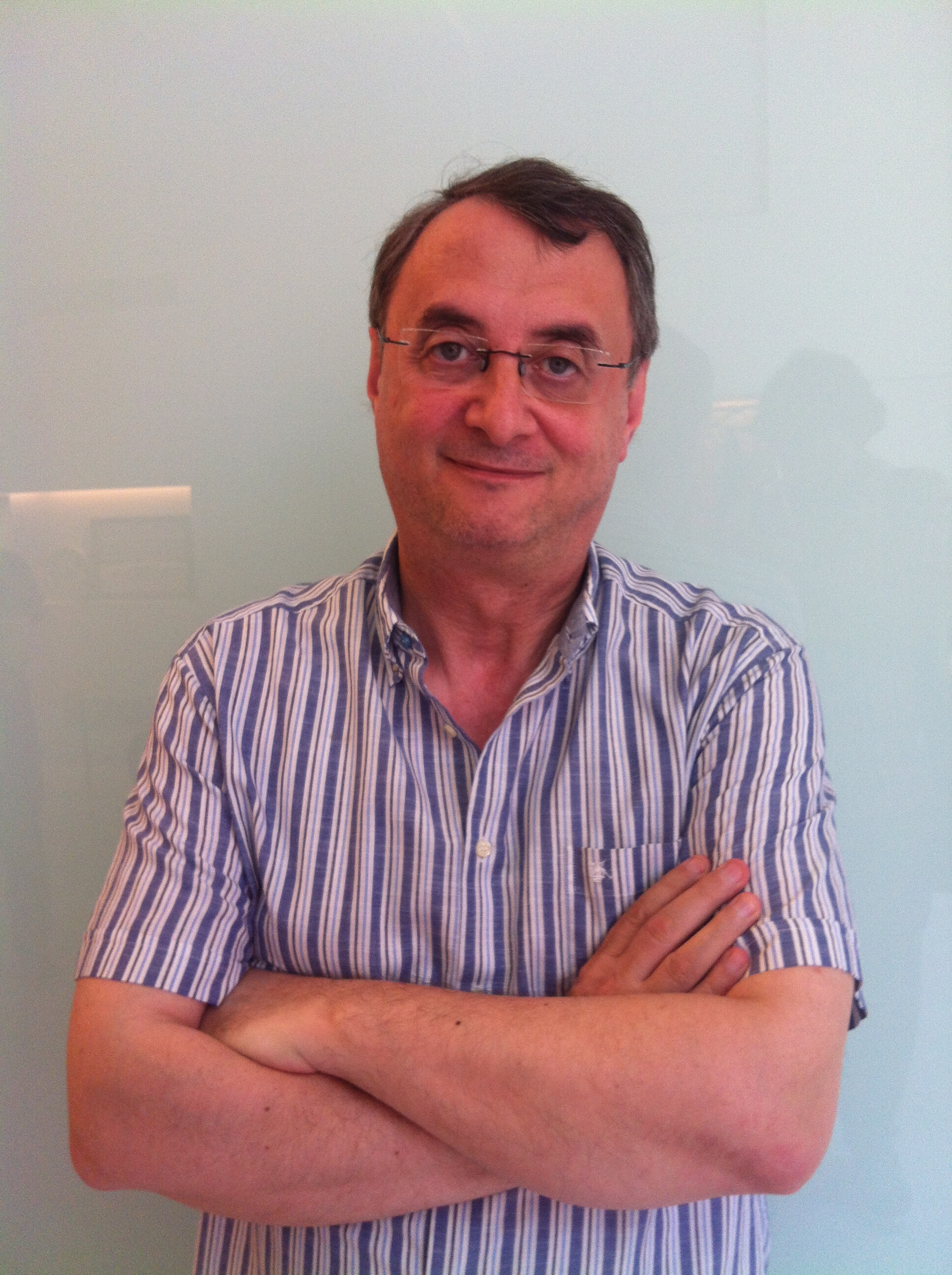
- Vicent Partal at Vilaweb
- Born: November 28, 1960 (age 65); Bétera
- Occupation: Journalist
- Notable work: VilaWeb

Vicent Partal (Valencian pronunciation: [viˈsɛm paɾˈtal]; born 1960 in Bétera, Valencia) is a Valencian journalist and director of VilaWeb. He has also worked in El Temps, Diari de Barcelona, TVE, Catalunya Ràdio, El Punt, and La Vanguardia, among others. He is considered an Internet pioneer.

In 1994, he created the self-styled "first news Internet system in Catalonia" named El Temps Online. In 1995, founded Partal, Maresma & Associats, a company devoted to Internet Consulting and access. From that initiative, La Infopista catalana appeared in 1996, which later became VilaWeb. He is currently the Chairman of the Board of the European Journalism Centre.

== Biography ==
Vicent Partal studied Magisterium at the University of Valencia and worked at the Gavina School. However, he soon changed his profession and began to work as a journalist.

Co-founder of the weekly magazine El Temps in 1983, he was a collaborator of the Diari de Barcelona and Televisión Española, where he specialized in international politics. As a reporter and correspondent, he covered events around the world, including the collapse of the Berlin Wall, the coup d'état in the USSR and the independence process of the Baltic countries, the Balkan war, the revolt of Beijing students, the End of apartheid in South Africa, the beginning of Palestinian autonomy, the conflict in Kurdistan or several elections in the United States.

In 1994 he created the first informative system on the Internet of the Catalan Areas, and from Spain called El Temps Online. In 1995, together with Assumpció Maresma, then director of El Temps's weekly magazine, he founded Infopista (first web directory in Catalan), which was later transformed into an electronic newspaper in Catalan, VilaWeb. In the same year he created with Jordi Vendrell the program L'Internauta in Catalunya Ràdio.

He is currently director of VilaWeb. He has collaborated with other media like Elpuntavui, El 9 Esportiu, Berria or Catalunya Ràdio.

He has published several monographs on NATO and the nationalisms of the former Soviet Union. He published the books Catalunya en l'estratègia militar d'Occident (1987), Els nacionalistes a l'URSS (1988), La revolta nacionalista a l'URSS (1991), Atles de l'Europa futura (1991), Catalunya 3.0 (2001), 11-M: El periodisme en crisi (2004, with Martxelo Otamendi) and Periodisme quàntic. . In June 2009 he published Llibreta de Pequín, the first commercial ebook in Catalan without print edition. He has also published two key books to understand the evolution of sovereignty in Catalonia, A un pam de la independència (2013) and Desclassificat 9-N (2015)

As for television, he has written the series Hem fet el Sud, (We made the South), and the show Una llengua que camina, a co-production between VilaWeb and Televisió de Catalunya on Escola Valenciana. He was also the scriptwriter of the controversial program Camaleon on Spanish public TV TVE, who made a criticism of news stories staging a false coup d'état in the Soviet Union.

He is the president of the European Journalism Center, based in Maastricht, a professional organization of continental scope that works for the promotion of quality journalism in Europe and to assimilate the great technological and cultural changes that accompany the digitalisation of the media.

Partal has won a number of awards, including Premi Ciutat de Barcelona 1999, Catalonia's National Internet Prize in 2000 and the National Journalism Prize in 2004.

== Books ==
- Catalunya en l'estratègia militar d'Occident (1987)
- Els nacionalistes a l'URSS (1988)
- La revolta nacionalista a l'URSS (1991)
- Atles de l'Europa futura (1991)
- Converses sobre els orígens d'internet a Catalunya (2000)
- Catalunya 3.0 (2001)
- 11-M: El periodisme en crisi, amb el periodista Martxelo Otamendi (2004)
- Periodisme quàntic. Fent periodisme a Internet. L'experiència dels primers deu anys de VilaWeb (2007)
- Llibreta de Pequín (2009)
- A un pam de la independència (2013)
- Desclassificat: 9-N (2015)
- Nou homenatge a Catalunya (2018)
