= VilaWeb =

Catalan news website

Vilaweb
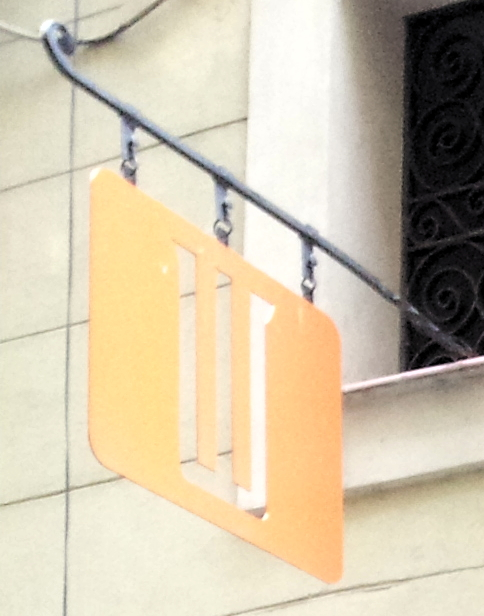
- Screenshot
- Website type: Politics; News and opinion
- Available in: Catalan and English
- Editor: Vicent Partal (editor-in-chief)
- Website: www.vilaweb.cat
- Commercial: Yes
- Registration: Optional
- Launched: 1995
- Current status: Active

VilaWeb (Valencian pronunciation: [ˌvilaˈwɛp]) is a Catalan-language web portal and daily nationalist news outlet, founded in May 1995 by the journalists Vicent Partal and Assumpció Maresma. It was the first online medium produced completely in Catalan, and the first news media in Spain to be based entirely online. Its editorial line advocates for Catalonia's separation from the Spanish state.

== History ==
VilaWeb grew out of an online directory in Catalan called Infopista, set up by Partal in 1995. It was initially designed as a local directory of catalan websites. One year later, Infopista turned into Vilaweb, including new services. Before embarking on this venture, Vicent Partal had been responsible for directing the digital edition of El Temps magazine. Written in Catalan, with the publication of this digital edition in 1994, the magazine was the first media outlet in Spain to establish material and a presence on the World Wide Web.

Later, Vilaweb became one of reference news and media channels for Catalan communities online. In 2007 VilaWeb TV opened as a web TV initiative. Nowadays it is available as a YouTube channel and on iTunes.

In September 2009 VilaWeb opened a newsroom, in El Raval, in downtown Barcelona. The building hosts a space for public events. In January 2014 VilaWeb started a Global Edition in English, managed by Liz Castro, and in June 2017 VilaWeb added an evening print product for subscribers called VilaWeb Paper. VilaWeb Paper is an evening edition, which readers can print, or download on their mobile or tablet. Unlike traditional newspapers, VilaWeb Paper is not available on any newsstands.

In 2018 VilaWeb had an audience of around 2,200,000 unique visitors.

VilaWeb has been awarded several prizes, including the Premi Ciutat de Barcelona de Periodisme, the Premi Nacional de Periodisme, and premi Òmnium Cultural de Comunicació.

Vilaweb has been criticized for being dependent on subsidies and other financial support by the Catalan regional government, even despite it receives far less financial support from public administrations than many Catalan media.

The newspaper is a member of MIDAS (European Association of Daily Newspapers in Minority and Regional Languages).

== Content ==
The newspaper runs news 24 hours a day. News from several news agencies are also available. Ed-op pages in the newspaper consist mainly on a daily article by Vicent Partal and weekly articles from other writers like Marta Rojals, Andreu Barnils, Xavier Montanyà, Pere Cardús or Martxelo Otamendi.

VilaWeb TV presents all the videos produced by VilaWeb.

== Bibliography ==
- Micó, Josep Lluís; Pere Masip (2009). "The fight of a minority language against the force of globalization: the case of Catalan on the Internet". In Gerard Goggin; Mark McLelland (eds.). Internationalizing Internet Studies: Beyond Anglophone Paradigms. Routledge advances in internationalizing media studies series, no. 2 (1st hbk of Taylor & Francis e-Library [2008] ed.). New York: Routledge. pp. 112–127. ISBN 978-0-415-95625-3. OCLC 288894064.
