= Edvin Sundquist =

Finland-Swedish newspaper editor and publisher (1885–1962)

- Born: Johan Edvin Sundquist; 17 May 1885; Solv, Finland
- Died: 15 March 1962 (aged 76); Vasa, Finland
- Occupations: Newspaper editor, publisher
- Known for: Editor-in-chief and owner of Vasabladet

Johan Edvin Sundquist (17 May 1885 – 15 March 1962) was a Finland Swede newspaper editor and publisher. For over half a century he was editor-in-chief and owner of Vasabladet, the leading Swedish-language newspaper in Ostrobothnia, through which he shaped much of the Swedish-language public debate in Finland. He is known for his resolute opposition to Nazism and wartime censorship, and for his role in the activist Jäger movement during the First World War.

== Biography ==
=== Early life and education ===
Sundquist was born in 1885 into a fishing and seafaring family in Solv, but considered Sundom his true home from early childhood. He attended Vasa Lyceum, where he showed an early interest in writing, contributing to the school newspaper and occasional publications before sitting his matriculation examination. He began university studies in Helsinki but abandoned them in 1908 when he embarked on his journalistic career at Vasabladet.

In 1913 Sundquist and his partner Edvin Frimodig acquired the majority shareholding in the printing company that published Vasabladet, making him both editor and owner of the paper.

=== The Jäger movement and years in Stockholm ===
During the First World War Sundquist took on the role of logistics chief for the Jäger movement in Vasa, organising the clandestine passage of young Finnish men to Germany for military training. On 15 May 1916 he was arrested by the Russian authorities and imprisoned in the Vasa county jail, from which he escaped to Sweden after six weeks.

From 1916 to 1918 Sundquist worked at the Swedish newspaper Aftonbladet in Stockholm, on the foreign desk, with journalist Valdemar Langlet as his professional model. These years gave him a grounding in international affairs and consolidated his strongly negative attitude toward Nazism.

=== Editor-in-chief of Vasabladet ===
Returning to Vasa in the winter of 1918, Sundquist led Vasabladet for more than four decades. He rapidly expanded the paper's publication from three to six days a week by 1918, and the paper grew into a commercially successful enterprise. His primary interests, however, lay in principled journalism rather than business or technical development.

A central theme of his editorship was the defence of the Swedish-speaking community in Finland and the promotion of Ostrobothnia as the heartland of Finnish-Swedish culture. He was a founding member of the Swedish People's Party of Finland and supported a range of Swedish-language cultural organisations, including Wasa Theatre, Svenska Österbottens ungdomsförbund, and Finlands svenska ungdomsförbund.

In the 1930s Sundquist took a firm stand against the Lapua movement, condemning its lawlessness. His guiding principle was that once a people abandons the rule of law, it has no foundation on which to stand.

=== Opposition to Nazism and wartime censorship ===
In 1939 Vasabladet published an article about Adolf Hitler on the occasion of his 50th birthday, drawing on foreign sources to portray him as a mediocre house painter who had risen from obscurity to the highest office in the state. The German legation protested vigorously, and the Finnish authorities brought a press freedom prosecution. After a conviction in the court of appeal, Sundquist entered prison on 15 May 1941 — exactly 25 years after his first imprisonment. He was released when a general amnesty was declared at the outbreak of the Continuation War.

Throughout the war years Vasabladet was among the most prominent opponents of censorship and the press manipulation practised by the Finnish State Information Bureau, which Sundquist dubbed puntilism after its driving force, Lauri Adolf Puntila. The paper was critical of Finland's war aims. On 4 August 1943 Sundquist was one of the signatories of the Peace address of the 33, a public appeal by Finnish intellectuals calling for a negotiated peace.

=== Later years ===
Sundquist remained editor-in-chief of Vasabladet until the end of his life, never stepping down despite the expectations of several would-be successors on the editorial staff. Observers noted that in his later years his former liberalism gave way to a more personally coloured conservatism, and that the paper struggled to keep pace with developments in journalism as a result. He died in Vasa on 15 March 1962.
