= Ff – Südtiroler Wochenmagazin =

The ff – Südtiroler Wochenmagazin is an Italy-based weekly journal for local politics, economy, society and culture, published for the German-speaking public of South Tyrol. The journal, well known for its social liberal views, can be characterized as the second-most influential German print medium in the area, following the Dolomiten newspaper.

Founded in 1980, the ff was originally intended to be a magazine for "television and leisure time" (Fernsehen und Freizeit). But soon the editorial office started to publish reports about controversial socio-political topics, quite often in opposition to the governing South Tyrolean People's Party.

According to the ff, the journal reaches a third of the South Tyrolean population.

== See also ==
- Neue Südtiroler Tageszeitung
