= Jakobstads Tidning =

- Type: Daily newspaper
- Format: Broadsheet
- Owner: Jakobstads Tidning Ab
- Editor: Henrik Othman
- Founded: 21 December 1898
- Ceased publication: 2008
- Political alignment: Neutral
- Language: Swedish
- Headquarters: Jakobstad

Jakobstads Tidning (abbr. JT) was a Swedish language regional newspaper in Finland published between 1898 and 2008.

== History and profile ==
Jakobstads Tidning was first published on 21 December 1898 originally as a weekly newspaper. In 2000, JT became a daily newspaper, having previously been published six times a week.

Its headquarters was located in Jakobstad with local offices located in Kokkola and Nykarleby. In 1996 the paper had a circulation of 11,972 copies. As of 2005 JT's circulation was 12,130 copies, most of which were sold in Jakobstad and surrounding regions in northern Ostrobothnia.

In 2008 it merged with Österbottningen to form Österbottens Tidning. At the time of the merge, Jakobstads Tidning was the third largest Swedish-language newspaper in Finland in terms of circulation, behind Hufvudstadsbladet and Vasabladet.
