= Miklós Vásárhelyi =

Hungarian journalist, politician and writer (1917–2001)

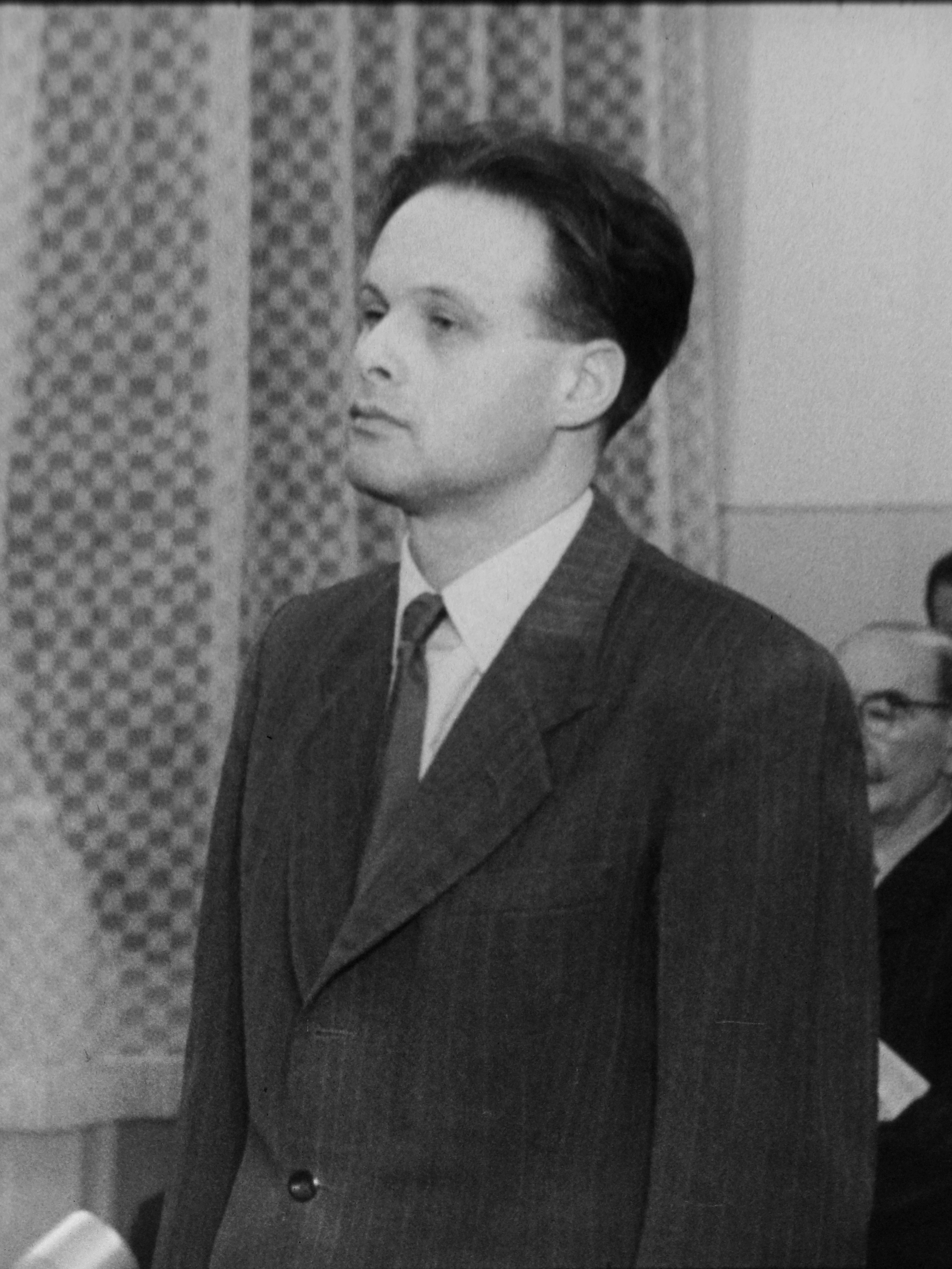

Member of the National Assembly
- In office 2 May 1990 – 27 June 1994

Personal details
- Born: 9 October 1917 Fiume, Kingdom of Hungary
- Died: 31 July 2001 (aged 83) Budapest
- Occupation: Journalist

Miklós Vásárhelyi (9 October 1917 – 31 July 2001) was a Hungarian journalist and politician from Hungary. He was the press secretary in the government of Imre Nagy during the Hungarian Revolution of 1956. After Hungary’s democratic transition in 1990, he became a member of the National Assembly.

== Life ==
He was born October 9, 1917, in Fiume and studied at Rome University and at the law faculty of the University of Debrecen.

He became a member of the Hungarian Communist Party in 1938. In 1942, he was sent into forced labor, like other Jews in Hungary. Later, he became a member of the Hungarian resistance against the German occupation.

After the war, he worked for Szabadság, the Communist party newspaper. He was shifted to Magyar Rádió and a propaganda magazine. After Imre Nagy became the prime minister, he appointed Vasárhelyi, who was a friend with his daughter, as the government press secretary. Nagy’s reforms displeased the Soviet Union and the government was dismissed. After the outbreak of the Hungarian Revolution in 1956, Nagy was asked back into government and reappointed Vasárhelyi as press secretary.

The failure of the revolt saw the reformers, including Nagy and Vasárhelyi, take refuge at the Yugoslav embassy. After leaving the embassy under a guarantee of safety, they were arrested and initially deported to Romania. In the trials that followed, Vasárhelyi was sentenced to five years in prison, while Nagy was hanged.

Vasárhelyi was released in 1960 and performed freelance work as a translator until 1972. The government of János Kádár began taking a softer approach, and Vasárhelyi found work at the Hungarian Academy of Science’s Institute of Literary Studies and as a script editor. He completed a book in 1974, The Lord and the Crown.

In 1983, he obtained a fellowship at Columbia University as a guess professor of media history. There he struck up a friendship with George Soros. He eventually became the Soros Foundation’s representative in Hungary and helped set up educational exchanges.

After the fall of the Communist regime, Vasárhelyi helped establish the Alliance of Free Democrats. At the first free elections, he won a seat in the National Assembly with the party and served from 1990 to 1994.

Vasárhelyi died on July 31, 2001, in Budapest.

== Works ==
- Nagy Imre Emlékplakett (1996)
- Demény Pál Emlékérem (1997)
- Francia Köztársaság Becsületrendje (1997)
- Pro Renovanda Cultura Hungariae fődíja (1998)
