= La Voce del Popolo =

Italian-language newspaper of Istria

- Type: Daily newspaper
- Format: Tabloid
- Owner: EDIT
- Editor: Ivo Vidotto
- Founded: 1885
- Language: Italian
- Headquarters: Zvonimirova 20a 51000 Rijeka
- Website: www.lavoce.hr

La Voce del Popolo (lit. 'The Voice of the People') is an Italian-language daily newspaper published by EDIT (EDizioni ITaliane) in the Croatian city of Rijeka.

== History and profile ==
La Voce del Popolo was first published in October 1944. The paper was supported by Josip Broz Tito and the Yugoslav partisans, taking its name from a paper which had been printed in Fiume (as Rijeka was then called) from 1885 until its suppression following the city's annexation to the Fascist Kingdom of Italy in 1924. During the post-World War II period it became the newspaper of the sizeable Italian community in Yugoslavia. With the independence of Slovenia and Croatia, La Voce del Popolo has continued to campaign for the Italian communities of the area as well as being read by Italian tourists in the summer. A monthly supplement focusing on the Italians of Dalmatia has been recently added.

The newspaper is a member of MIDAS (European Association of Daily Newspapers in Minority and Regional Languages).
