= Österbottens Tidning =

Swedish-language newspaper published in Finland

- Type: Daily newspaper
- Format: Tabloid
- Owner: HSS Media
- Editor: Margareta Björklund
- Founded: 2008
- Political alignment: Neutral
- Language: Swedish
- Headquarters: Jakobstad and Karleby, Finland
- ISSN: 1797-5492
- Website: www.ot.fi

Österbottens Tidning (abbreviated ÖT) is a Swedish language regional daily newspaper, which is mainly distributed in the largely Swedish speaking Ostrobothnia in Finland.

== History and profile ==
It was formed on 23 May 2008 through a merger of Jakobstads Tidning in Jakobstad (Pietarsaari in Finnish) and Österbottningen in Karleby (Kokkola in Finnish). It is published by HSS Media. The newspaper focuses on the Jakobstad and Kokkola region and it is published daily.

The newspaper had two editors in 2008, Tom Johansson in Karleby and Henrik Othman in Jakobstad. Margareta Björklund is the chief editor.

In May 2013, the online news content was locked behind a hard paywall. The circulation of the paper was 13,817 copies in 2013.

The newspaper is a member of MIDAS (European Association of Daily Newspapers in Minority and Regional Languages).
