= Joan Mari Torrealdai =

Basque writer, journalist and sociologist (1942–2020)

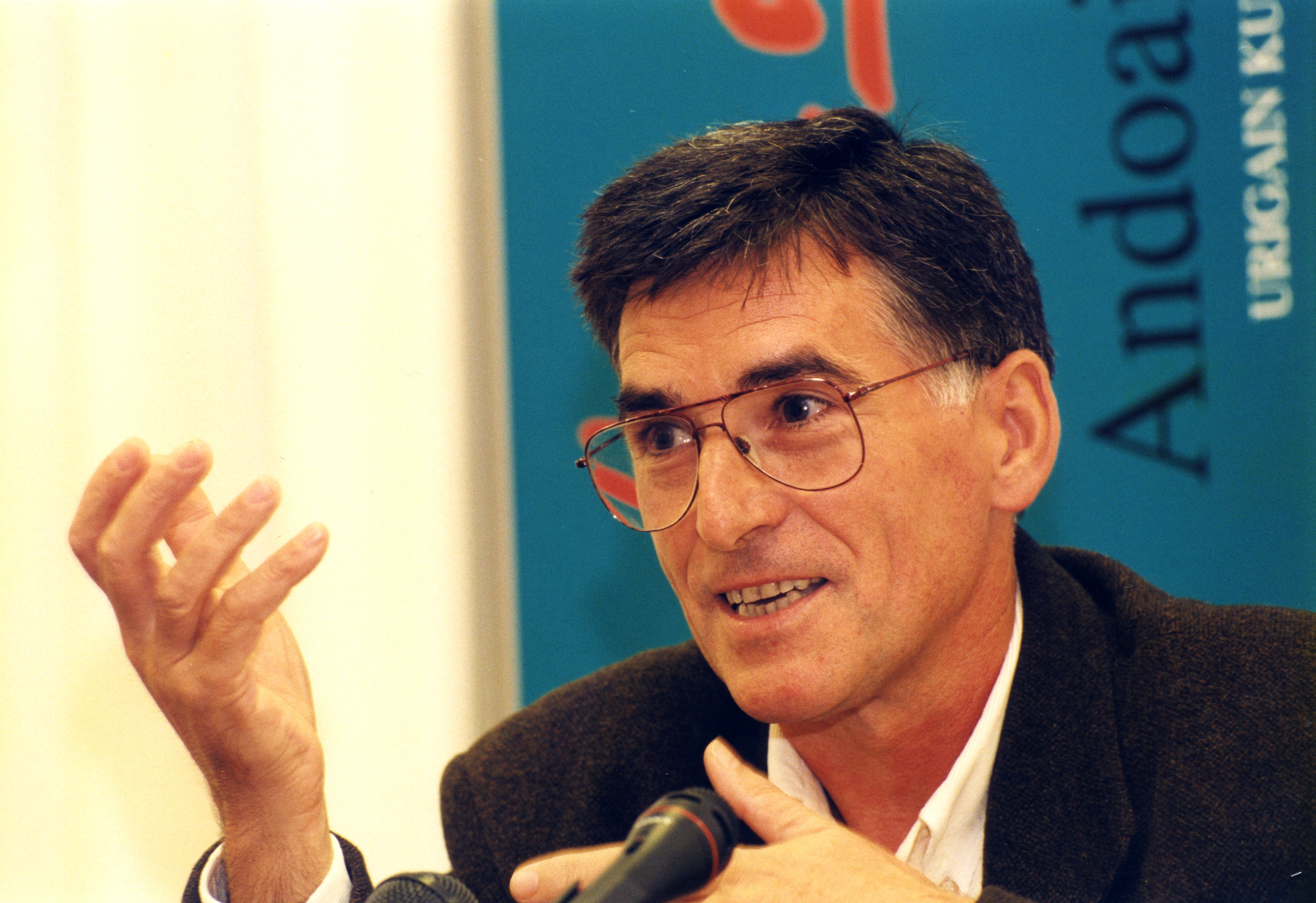
- Torrealdai in homage paid to writer Martin Ugalde
- Born: Joan Mari Torrealdai Nabea; 24 November 1942; Forua, Biscay
- Died: 31 July 2020 (aged 77); Usurbil, Gipuzkoa
- Occupations: writer, journalist and sociologist
- Writing career
- Language: Basque
- Genre: Essay
- Subjects: Standard Basque, Basque culture
- Notable works: Jakin journal (1967); Euskaldunon Egunkaria (1990); Catalogue of 20th-century Basque books (1993); El libro negro del euskera (The Black Book of Basque) (1998)

Joan Mari Torrealdai Nabea (24 November 1942 – 31 July 2020) was a Basque writer, journalist and sociologist. He was a member of Euskaltzaindia (the Royal Academy of the Basque Language). He was born in Forua, Biscay, Basque Autonomous Community, Spain.

== Career ==
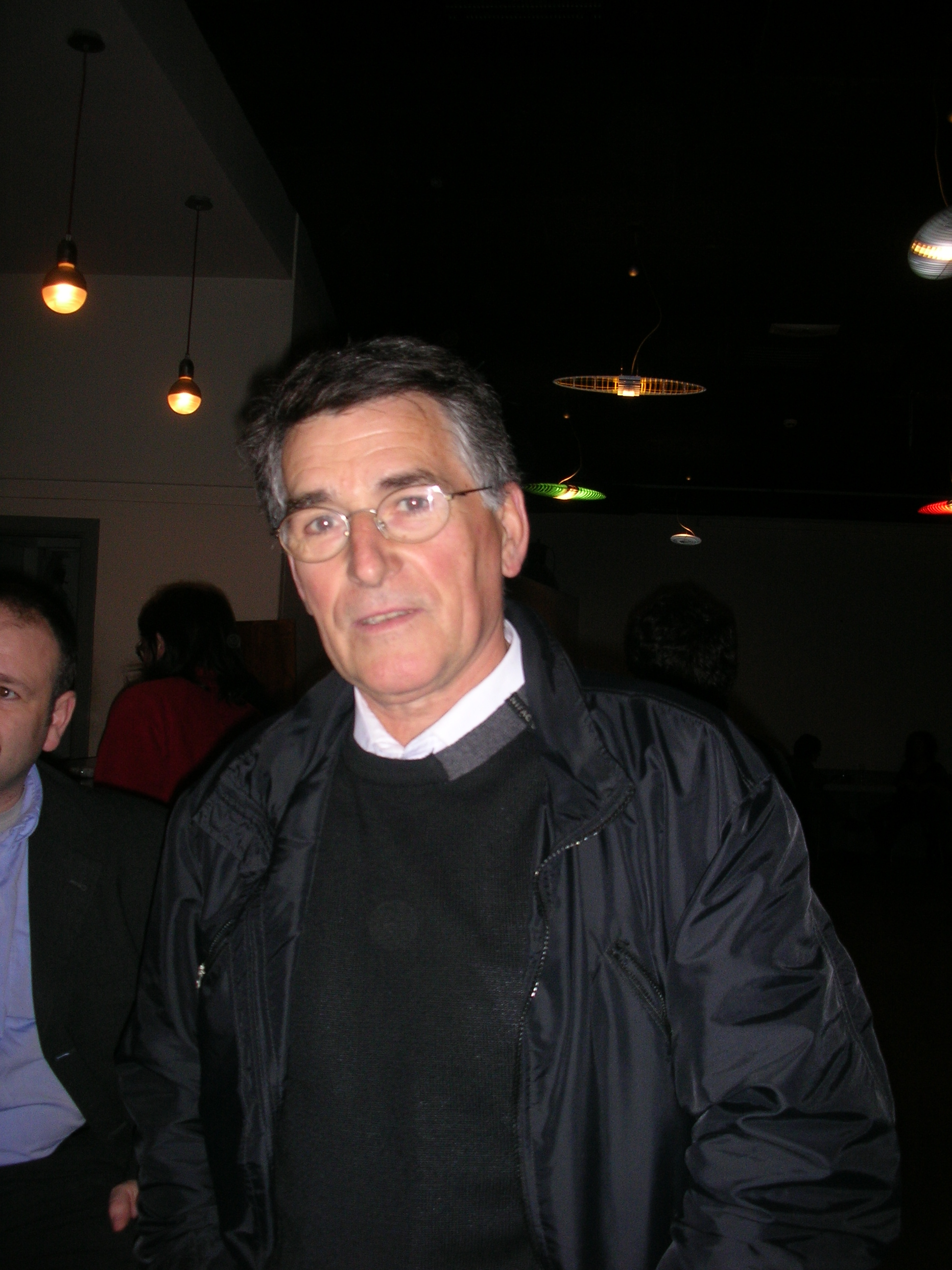
Joan Mari Torrealdai in 2009

He has carried out bibliographic work on books published in Basque annually since 1977, with two main features:

- Book production is understood as an indicative of our society. In 1993, Torrealdai published sociological research on Basque language writers: Euskal idazleak gaur (Basque Writers Today); in 1997, he published further sociological research into the situation of culture produced in Basque: Euskal kultura gaur (Basque Culture Today). This study is given across 30 numbers of the Jakin magazine.
- The general catalogue of all the books written in Basque during the twentieth century was completed with bibliographic cards. With all this information he intended to elaborate the Observatory of the Basque Book.

Torrealdai conducted his research into Basque language and culture with an aim to foster the use of this language, and to catalyze its cultural production, in order to make it survive.

In 1967 Torrealdai became editor of the Jakin and Anaitasuna journals. In 1985, he presented the first degree dissertation done in Basque in the University of the Basque Country on Basque Public Television (ETB) and its use of Basque language.

In 1990, he joined the Administration Council of Euskaldunon Egunkaria to create and manage the first modern Basque newspaper; he was later elected president of its Administration Council.

In 1993, he compiled a catalogue of 20th-century Basque books. In 1998 he published El libro negro del euskera (The Black Book of Basque) dealing with the attacks endured by the Basque language over the centuries. In 1998, he wrote a biography of Martin Ugalde, the first President of the Administration Council of newspaper Euskaldunon Egunkaria: Martin Ugalde. Andoaindik Hondarribira Caracasetik Barrena (Martin Ugalde, from Andoain to Hondarribia via Caracas). In 1998, he wrote La censura de Franco y los escritores vascos del 98 (Franco's censorship and Basque Writers of the 98th Generation).

In 2003, he was arrested and tortured by the Government of Spain in a campaign against the newspaper Euskaldunon Egunkaria. In 2007 he was appointed as a full member of the Royal Academy of the Basque Language. In 2011 he took charge of the Azkue Library of the academy.

In 2010, he was acquitted of all charges, along with all his companions, including Txema Auzmendi, Martxelo Otamendi, Xabier Oleaga and Iñaki Uria.

From 2015 to 2017 he served as Chairman of the PuntuEUS Foundation.

== Prizes ==
Among others, he has received the following prizes:

- Euskadi Silver Prize (1997), for the most sold book being in the Market of Book Day celebrated in San Sebastian. Euskal Kultura gaur. Liburuaren mundua (Basque Culture today. The world of the book).
- Euskadi Silver Prize (1998), for the most sold book being in the Market of Book Day celebrated in San Sebastián. El libro negro del euskera (The black book of Basque language).
- Irun City Literature Award (1999), in the category of essay for the work, “La censura de Franco y el tema vasco” (Franco's Censorship and the Basque Issue).
- Honorific mention, in the XIXth Rikardo Arregi Journalism Prize (2007).
- Lauaxeta Prize (2010), given by the Chartered Provincial Council of Bizkaia for his work to explore and promote the Basque language.
- Dabilen Elea prize (2011)
- Prize Manuel Lekuona (2015) awarded by Eusko Ikaskuntza (the Basque Studies Society).
