= Coat of arms of Schleswig-Holstein =

Coat of arms of the German state of Schleswig-Holstein

Versions
- Schleswig-Holstein state logo for use by the public
- Armiger: Government of Schleswig-Holstein
- Adopted: 1957
- Shield: Per pale. Or two lions passant azure pale, armed and langued gules. Gules, a nettle leaf argent.
- Use: The coat of arms may only be used by state authorities. The state logo is eligible for use by the general public.

The coat of arms of the German state of Schleswig-Holstein is vertically divided: in the heraldically right field, i.e. left as seen by the viewer, two blue lions are depicted on a golden background, facing the other half. The lions of Schleswig were taken from the coat of arms of Denmark. The heraldically left side is red with the silver nettle leaf of Holstein, an ancient symbol which had been in use with the Counts of Schauenburg and Holstein.

== History ==
In contrast to the proper Schleswig lions which face to the left (cf. this gallery) the lions in the state arms face the right side. According to legend Otto von Bismarck ordered this change after the Second Schleswig War because he thought it was "impolite" by the Lions to show their hindside to Holstein. The current version was adopted by the government of Schleswig-Holstein on 18 January 1957.

In fact, it is usual in German heraldry for charges in a composite coat of arms to turn to face the center; this practice is known as heraldic courtoisie ('courtesy').

Duchy of Schleswig 1058–1866

Duchy of Holstein 1474–1864

Free and Hanseatic City of Lübeck 1226–1811 and 1815–1937

Duchy of Saxe-Lauenburg 1507–1671

Province of Schleswig-Holstein 1868–1946

== State logo ==
The coat of arms may only be used by official authorities. The government has issued a logo though, which may be used by the common public. It features a rounded shield and simplified lions.

== See also ==
- Coat of arms of Prussia
- Coat of arms of Germany
- Origin of the coats of arms of German federal states.
