= Neue Südtiroler Tageszeitung =

The Neue Südtiroler Tageszeitung (lit. 'New South Tyrolean Daily Newspaper'), shortened as Tageszeitung, is an Italian daily regional newspaper and one of two German-language daily newspapers published in South Tyrol. Founded in 1996, it holds social liberal views as opposed to the conservative stance of the Dolomiten, the oldest and most influential German newspaper in the autonomous province. Published from Tuesday to Sunday, the paper has an average daily circulation of 12,000 sales.

The Neue Südtiroler Tageszeitung evolved in 1996 from the weekly Südtirol Profil (South Tyrol Profile). It has a team of ten editors and a similar number of freelancers. It features articles and opinions ranging from current world affairs to sociopolitical topics. In the later field, its record of uncovering deficiencies and creating scandals has made the paper the object of several lawsuits.

The newspaper is a member of MIDAS (European Association of Daily Newspapers in Minority and Regional Languages).

== See also ==
- ff - Südtiroler Wochenmagazin
