= Inoslav Bešker =

Croatian journalist (1950–2023)

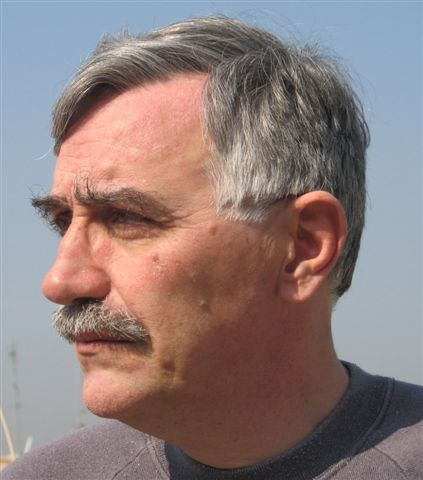
- Bešker in 2007
- Born: 30 January 1950; Zagreb, PR Croatia, FPR Yugoslavia (present-day Croatia)
- Died: 29 June 2023 (aged 73)
- Education: University of Zagreb, University of Milan
- Occupations: Journalist, academic
- Years active: 1967–2023

Inoslav Bešker (30 January 1950 – 29 June 2023) was a Croatian and Italian journalist and academic.

Bešker started his journalistic career in 1967. From 1989 he worked as a correspondent from Rome for Vjesnik, Večernji list, BBC, Radio 101, Danas, Croatian Radiotelevision, and Globus. From 2000 he was a correspondent and columnist for Jutarnji list and since 2016 for Globus and Slobodna Dalmacija.

Bešker had a degree in journalism from the University of Zagreb. He obtained a PhD in Comparative Slavic studies from the University of Milan in 2001. He taught literature on Mediterranean at the University of Split. He also taught Slavic studies at University of Naples "L'Orientale", Sapienza University of Rome, University of Bologna, and Communication studies at the University of Zagreb and University of Dubrovnik.

His research interests included Morlachs in European literature, onomastics of Croatia, toponomastics of the Balkans, heortology and anthropology of religion.

His most important books in the field of journalism include: Istraživačko novinarstvo (Investigative journalism, Zagreb, 2004), Iza vatikanskih zidina (Behind the Vatican walls, Zagreb, 2013), the biographies of the Popes John Paul II and Francis; in the field of comparative literature and imagology: I Morlacchi nella letteratura europea (The Morlachs in the European literature, Rome, 2007), La musa violenta (The violent Muse, Rome, 2007), Mediteran u književnosti (The Mediterranean in literature, Zagreb, 2021); in the field of anthropology of religion: Blagdani (Holidays, Zagreb, 2020), and Svetost i zločin (Holiness and crime, Zagreb, 2022).

In 2003 Bešker received a Journalist of the Year award by the Croatian Journalists' Association and in 2007 a Life Achievement Award from the same organization. He was a laureate of The MIDAS Otto von Habsburg Prize for Journalism in Minority Protection and Cultural Diversity in Europe.

Bešker died on 29 June 2023, at the age of 73.
