= Flensborg Avis =

Newspaper

- Type: Daily newspaper (six times per week)
- Format: Berliner
- Owner: Flensborg Avis AG
- Publisher: Flensborg Avis AG
- Editor-in-chief: Søren Munch
- Founded: 1 October 1869
- Political alignment: None
- Language: Danish (2/3) and German (1/3)
- Headquarters: Flensburg, Germany
- Website: fla.de

Flensborg Avis is a Danish language daily newspaper, published in Flensburg (Danish: Flensborg), Germany. It regularly cooperates with Flensburger Tageblatt, a German majority newspaper in the city, and Der Nordschleswiger, a German minority newspaper published in Denmark.

== History and profile ==
Flensborg Avis was first published on 1 October 1869 in Flensburg by members of the Danish minority in the Province of Schleswig-Holstein. The paper represents the Danish minority in Southern Schleswig. The headquarters of the paper is in Flensburg and there are local editorial offices in the towns of Schleswig (Slesvig), Husum and Niebüll (Nibøl). The paper is published in Berliner format six times per week.

During the Nazi rule in Germany the German supplement of Flensborg Avis, Der Schleswiger, was suspended several times.

Since 1974 the paper has a German language section as well. In addition, Flensborg Avis is co-owner of Radio Schleswig-Holstein, a private radio station in Northern Germany, which broadcasts daily news in Danish. In 2013 the past issues of the paper was digitalised.

Flensborg Avis had a circulation of 6,000 copies in March 2008.

The newspaper is a member of MIDAS (European Association of Daily Newspapers in Minority and Regional Languages).
