= Allgemeine Deutsche Zeitung für Rumänien =

The Allgemeine Deutsche Zeitung für Rumänien (ADZ) is a German-language daily newspaper based in Romania.

== History ==
The ADZ was first published in 1993. Apart from its head office in Bucharest, the newspaper also has local offices in Sibiu/Hermannstadt, Brașov/Kronstadt, Reșița/Reschitza, Satu Mare/Neumarkt and Timișoara/Temeschwar.

It is currently the only German-language daily newspaper published in Eastern Europe.

The newspaper is a member of MIDAS (European Association of Daily Newspapers in Minority and Regional Languages).
