= Szabadság =

- Type: Daily
- Founded: December 23, 1989
- Language: Hungarian
- Circulation: 7,000-8,000
- Website: Online edition

Szabadság (Hungarian pronunciation: [ˈsɒbɒt͡ʃːaːɡ], Freedom) is a Hungarian-language local daily newspaper published in Cluj-Napoca (Kolozsvár), Romania. Its average circulation is about 7,000-8,000 copies a day, with a readership up to 40,000 readers.

== Overview ==
The newspaper was first named Igazság (Truth) and was published in communist Romania between 20 May 1945 to 22 December 1989. After the Revolution, it was renamed to Szabadság and continued to be published six times a week.

On March 15, 1995, Szabadság became the first daily newspaper from Romania and Hungary with its own web page. It was the first in Romania to use the offset technology and to be published in full color.

With a total staff of 30, including 20 journalists, the daily is distributed in 5 counties in central Transylvania.

The newspaper is privately owned by the Minerva Cultural Association, an NGO led by employees of Szabadság. The Hungarian-language daily is financially independent and does not receive any government grants. Its costs are covered by sales (around 60%) and advertising (40%). Less than 1% of its annual turnover comes from public foundations from Hungary and Romania.

The newspaper is a member of MIDAS (European Association of Daily Newspapers in Minority and Regional Languages).
