= Flensburger Tageblatt =

German newspaper

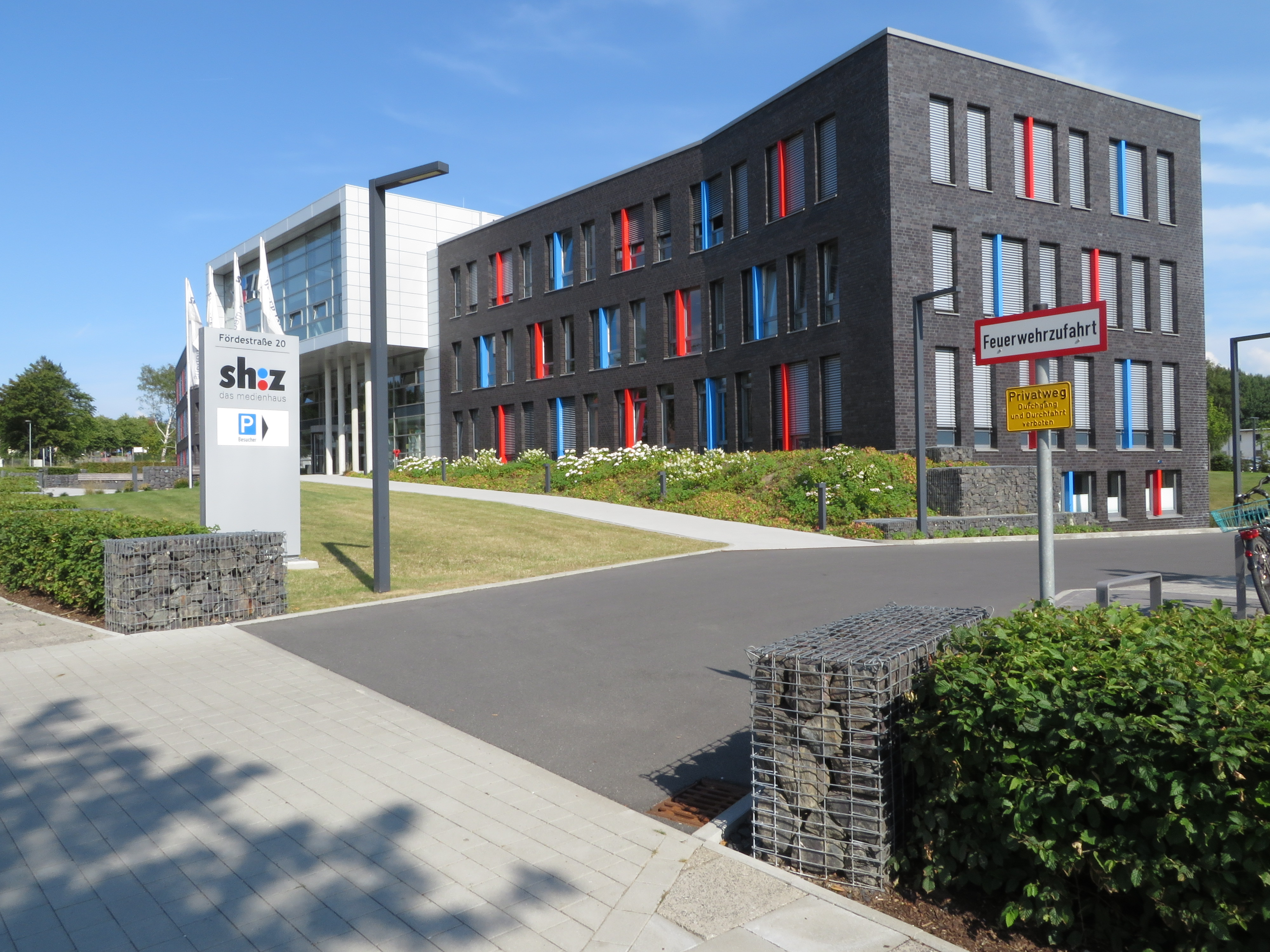
- Medienhaus of Schleswig-Holsteinische Zeitungsverlag, home of the newspaper's editorial room
- Type: Daily newspaper, 6 issues per week
- Publisher: Schleswig-Holsteinischer Zeitungsverlag (Schleswig-Holstein)
- Editor: Stefan Hans Kläsener
- Founded: June 15, 1865; 160 years ago
- Language: German
- Headquarters: Medienhaus; Fördestraße 20, Mürwik; Flensburger
- Country: Germany
- Circulation: 27,050 Monday thru Saturday
- Website: www.shz.de/lokales/flensburger-tageblatt/

The German-language Flensburger Tageblatt is, in addition to the Danish-language Flensborg Avis, one of two daily newspapers in Flensburg, Germany. The independent newspaper brings news for Flensburg and the district of Schleswig-Flensburg. It is published six times a week, published by the Schleswig-Holsteinische Zeitungsverlag. Its printing press is at Büdelsdorf near Rendsburg. The sold circulation amounts to 27,050 copies, a minus of 30.7 per cent since 1998.

== Editorial staff ==
The editorship is composed of the city editor in Flensburg and the district editor in Schleswig. 25 correspondents report from the surrounding area: Harrislee, Mittelangeln, Schafflund, Tarp, Lindewitt, Langballig, Handewitt, Gelting, Amt Eggebek and Hürup. The editorial office is in the Medienhaus of Schleswig-Holsteinische Zeitungsverlag in Fördestraße 20 in Mürwik. The customer center is located in Nikolaistrasse 7 between ZF Flensburg and the Holm in downtown Flensburg.

Known contributors have included Hugo Eckener, who wrote as a cultural critic for the newspaper, and Wolfgang Börnsen, who reported from 1963 as a "breaking news village reporter", including the snow catastrophe in northern Germany in 1978. Well-known cartoonist is the cartoonist Kim Schmidt.

== History ==
=== Origins ===
Flensburg's first local newspaper appeared in 1766 and called itself Flensburger Address-Comptoir-Nachrichten. From 1788 to 1853 the "Flensburg weekly paper" brought besides messages still popular educational texts in the tradition of the Enlightenment. The "Flensburger Zeitung", published in 1840, the first daily newspaper of the Fördestadt, was published from 1865 under the title "Flensburger Nachrichten" and was predecessor of the Flensburger Tageblatt.

=== Flensburg News 1865–1945 ===
The first publisher of the Flensburger Nachrichten was the pharmacist Ponton, from Kolding, in 1865. The printer and travel agent Ludolf P. H. Maaß from Itzehoe took over the newspaper a year later. The newspaper is originally named Tanta Maaß, after the granddaughter of the former publisher (from 1866) and editor Ludolf Maaß. Johanna Maaß was the daughter of his son, the publisher Friedrich Maaß, who took over the newspaper in 1892. Johanna Maaß was also the wife of aviation pioneer Hugo Eckener, who worked at the newspaper as a cultural critic.
