= Coat of arms of Schleswig =

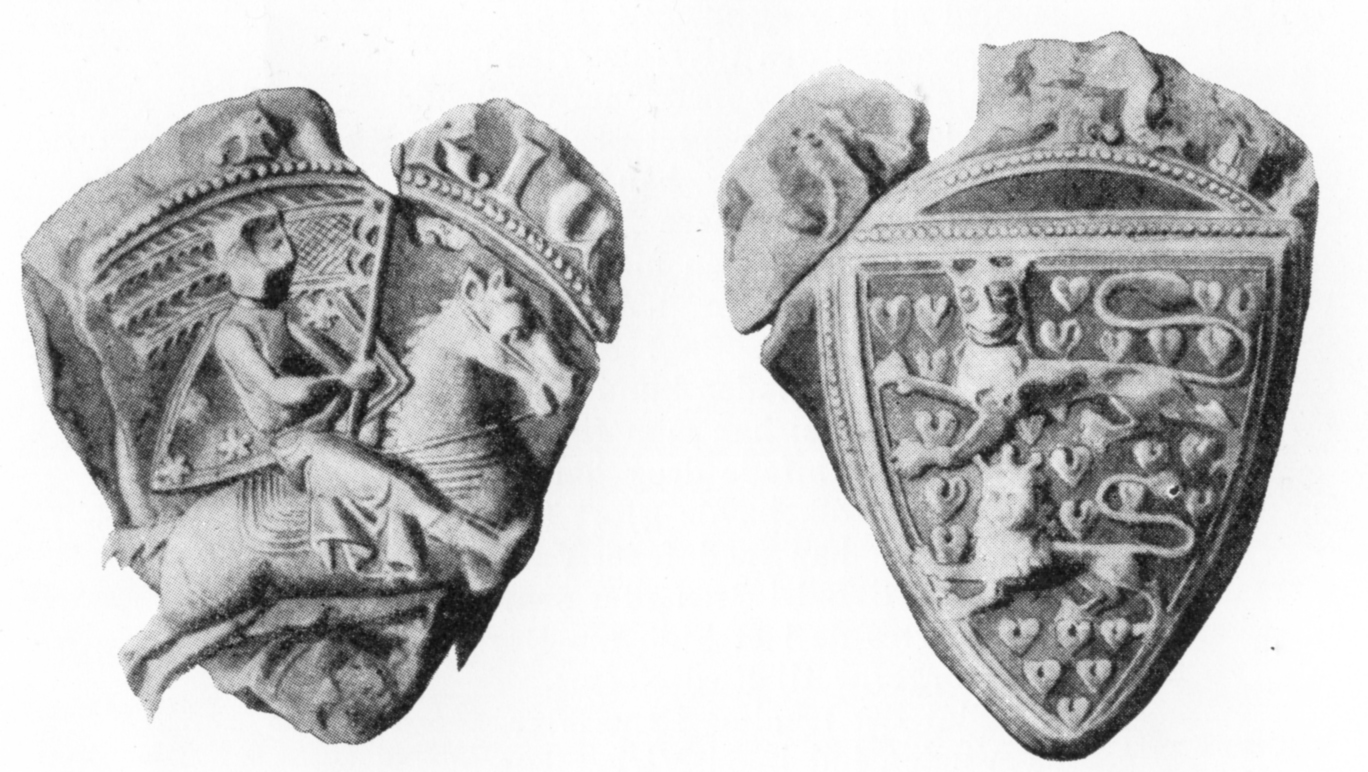
The first known example of the insignia: the seal of Erik Abelsøn, Duke of Schleswig (d. 1272)

The coat of arms of Schleswig or Southern Jutland (Danish: Sønderjylland or Slesvig) depicts two blue lions in a golden shield. It is the heraldic symbol of the former Duchy of Schleswig, originally a Danish province but later disputed between Danes and Germans. The region has been divided between Germany and Denmark since 1920 and the symbol consequently appears in official heraldry in both countries. It is derived from the national coat of arms of Denmark and has been dated to the middle of the 13th century, first known from the arms of Erik Abelsøn, Duke of Schleswig. Throughout the ages, the design has featured both crowned and uncrowned lions, the lions have occasionally been accompanied by heraldic hearts, and usage between heraldic lions and leopards has shifted. The far most common version was to omit both crowns and hearts and this version has been used exclusively for several centuries.

The blazon in heraldic terms is: Or, two lions passant in pale Azure armed Or langued Gules.

== Current use ==
=== Denmark ===
The unmodified arms of Schleswig is represented in the coat of arms of Denmark's royal family. The symbol has been located in the top-right corner since 1819 as specified by royal decree. The current version was specified by royal decree in December 2024.

A modified form of the symbol was used by the South Jutland County from 1980 until the county was dissolved effective January 1, 2007. The county originally wished to use the historic arms, but official authorisation was withheld to avoid confusion with both the royal coat of arms and the arms of the German Bundesland Schleswig-Holstein. This modified version showed the two lions jointly holding a Danish pennant. This was inspired by the medieval seal of Eric of Pomerania in which the three lions jointly hold the Danish flag.

=== Germany ===
The coat of arms of Schleswig-Holstein is a combination of the historic insignia of Holstein and a slightly modified version of the Schleswig arms. This symbol was used by the secessionist German administration of the two duchies during the First War of Schleswig (1848–51) and depicted on the currency issued by this administration. At this time, the lions faced left. The area became a Prussian province following the Second War of Schleswig (1864) and the symbol was restored. The lions have faced right since the 1880s. According to legend, this change was ordered by Otto von Bismarck who noted that it was "impolite" of the Schleswig lions to turn their backs on Holstein. The official insignia is reserved for the government of Schleswig-Holstein, but a slightly modified version is allowed for use by the general public. The lions also appear in the coats of arms of the city of Flensburg, and the Kreise Schleswig-Flensburg and Rendsburg-Eckernförde. Many municipal arms in the German part of Schleswig also use insignia featuring either the two lions or the Schleswig colours, blue and yellow.

== Gallery ==
The original coat of arms of Schleswig is represented in the bottom-right corner of the arms of the Danish royal family

In Danish heraldry, the Schleswig lions normally appear with red tongues and golden claws.

The original coat of arms of Schleswig is represented in the top-right corner of the small crest on the arms of the Greek royal family.

Coat of arms of the Duchy of Schleswig on the Geographia Blaviana (1659).

Coat of arms of the German Bundesland Schleswig-Holstein

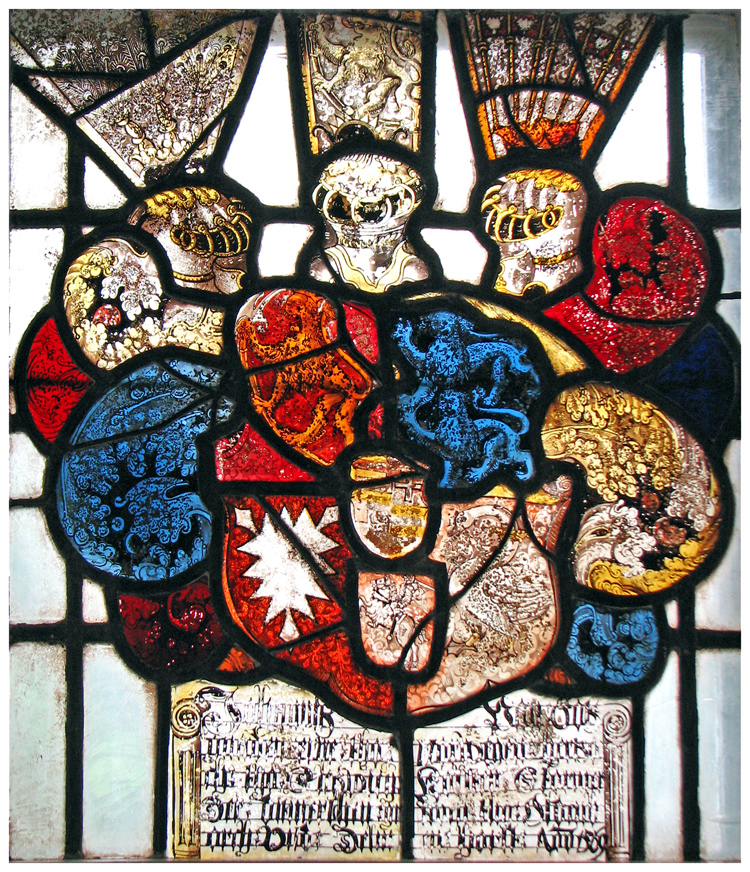
Coat of arms of Duke Hans the Elder of Schleswig-Holstein-Haderslev (a son of Frederick I of Denmark)

Coat of arms of Flensburg

Coat of arms of Kreis Schleswig-Flensburg

Coat of arms of Kreis Rendsburg-Eckernförde

Coat of arms of Böklund

Coat of arms of Busdorf

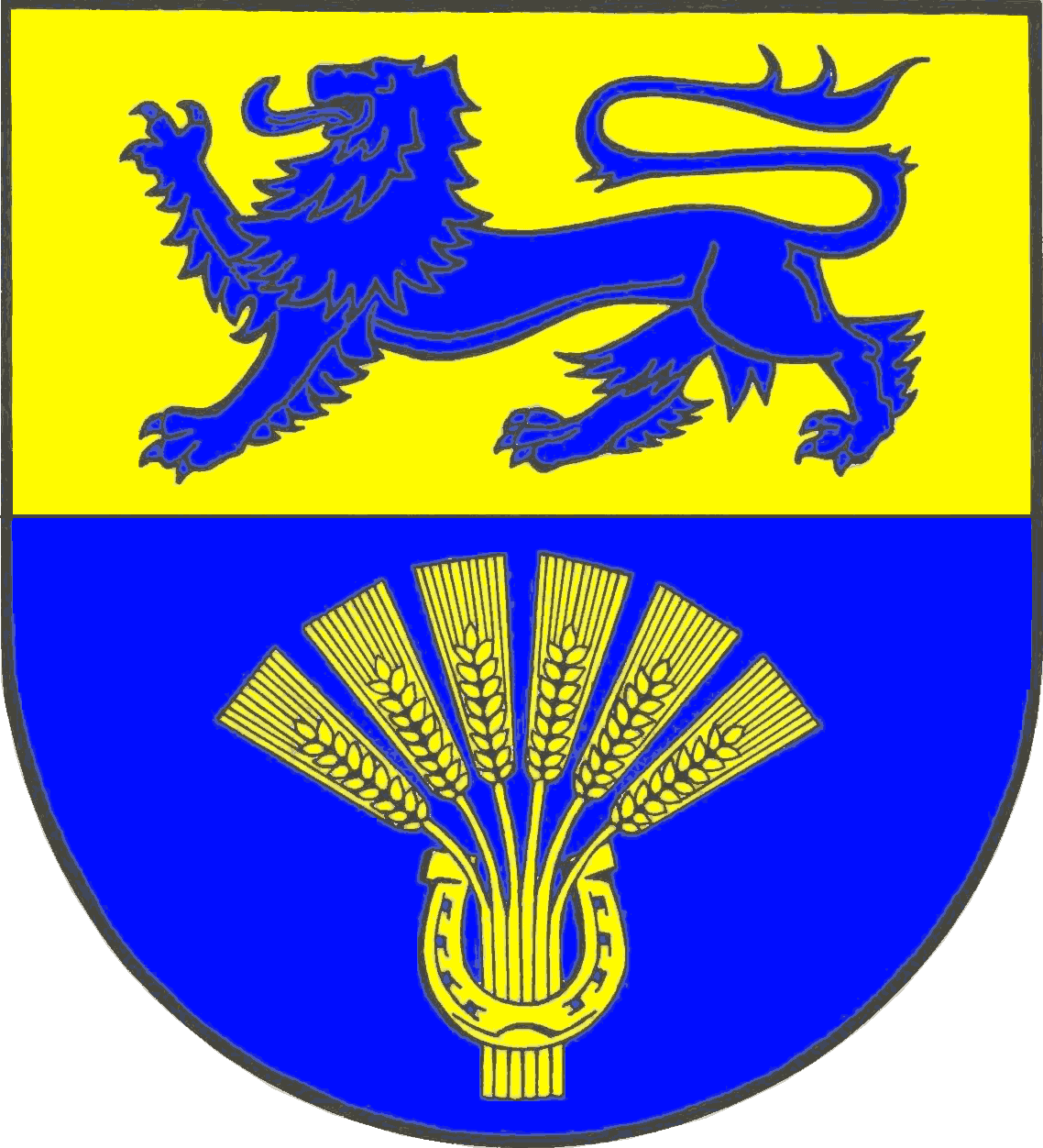
Coat of arms of Handewitt

Coat of arms of Amt Langballig

Coat of arms of Munkbrarup

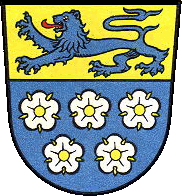
Coat of arms of the former Kreis Flensburg-Land

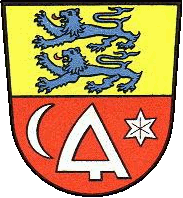
Coat of arms of the former Kreis Husum

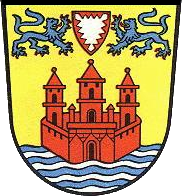
Coat of arms of the former Kreis Rendsburg

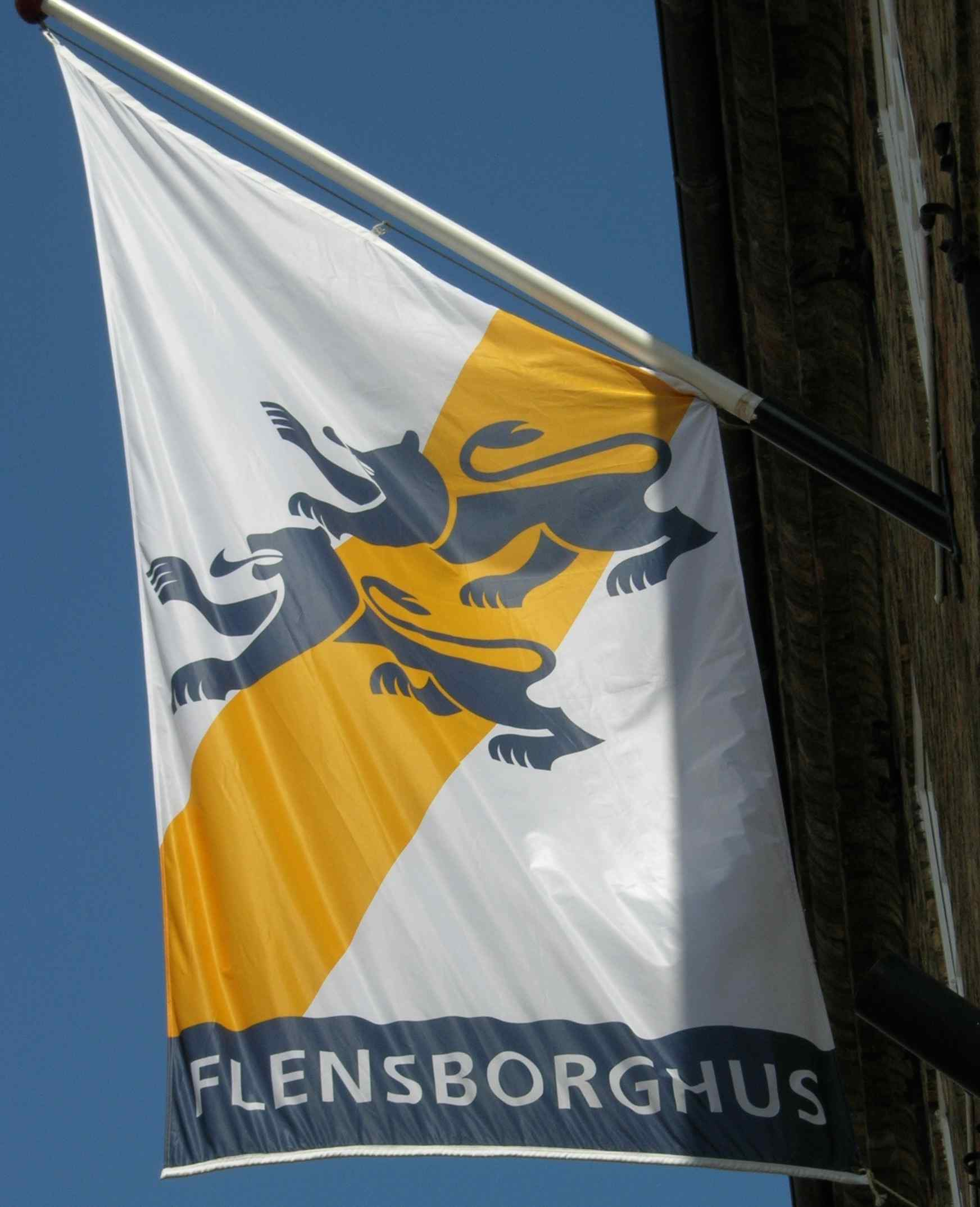
Flag used by the South Schleswig Association, representing the Danish minority in Germany

== See also ==
- Coat of arms of Denmark
