= Danish minority of Southern Schleswig =

Ethnic Danish community in northern Germany

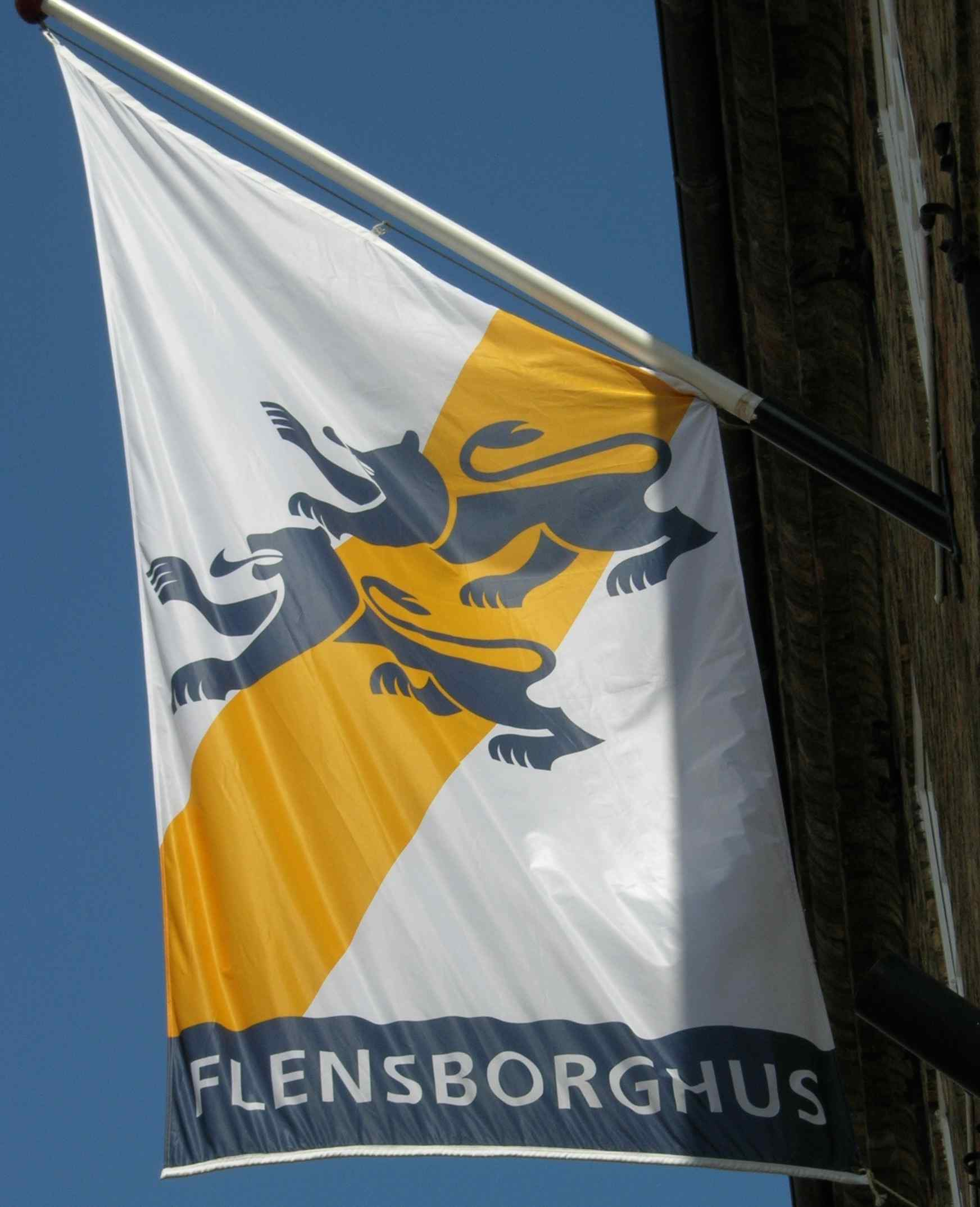
Flag used by the South Schleswig Association showing the Schleswig lions

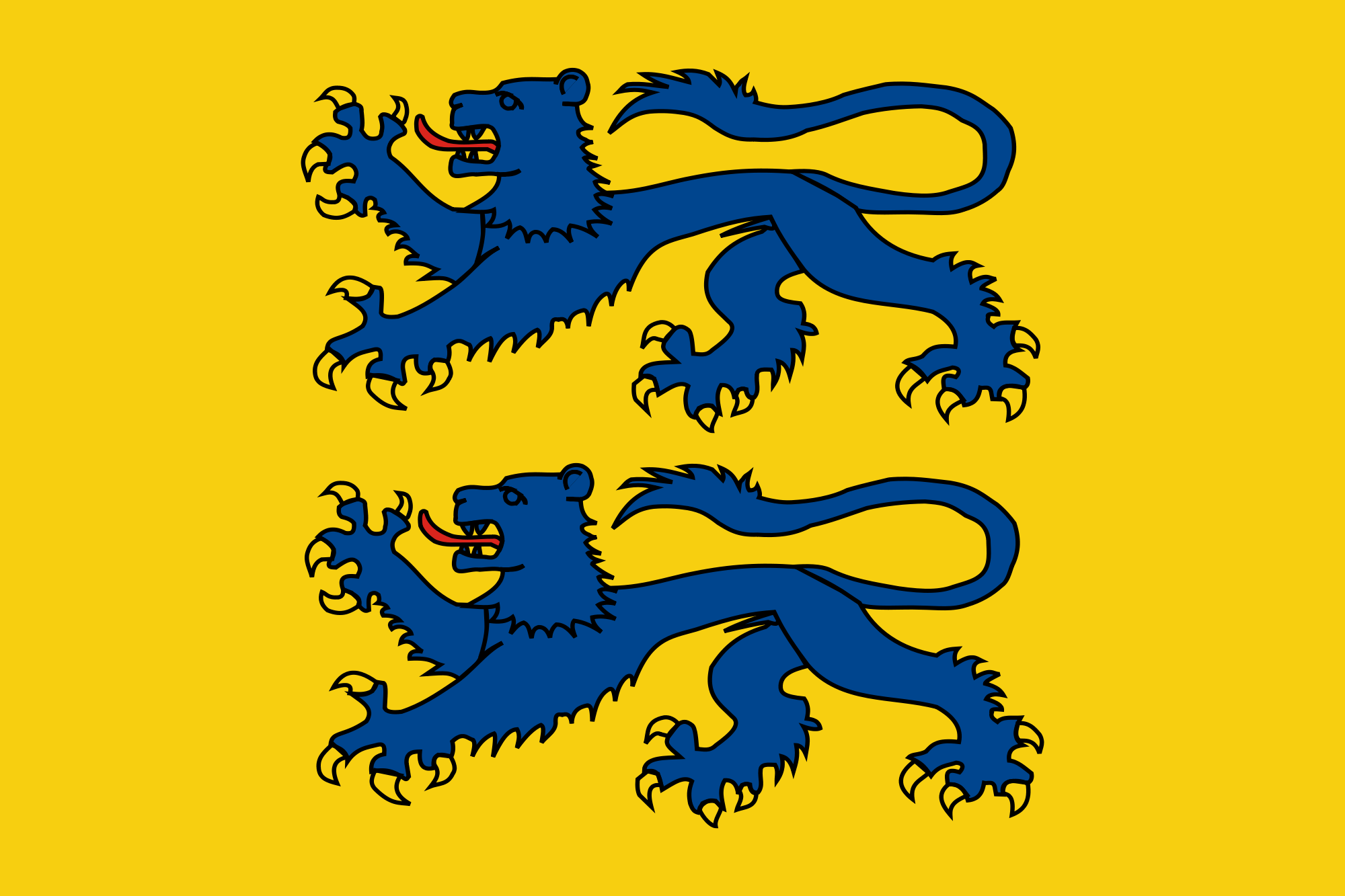
Flag of the Danes of Southern Schleswig. The Schleswig Lions as heraldic emblem of Schleswig / Sønderjylland

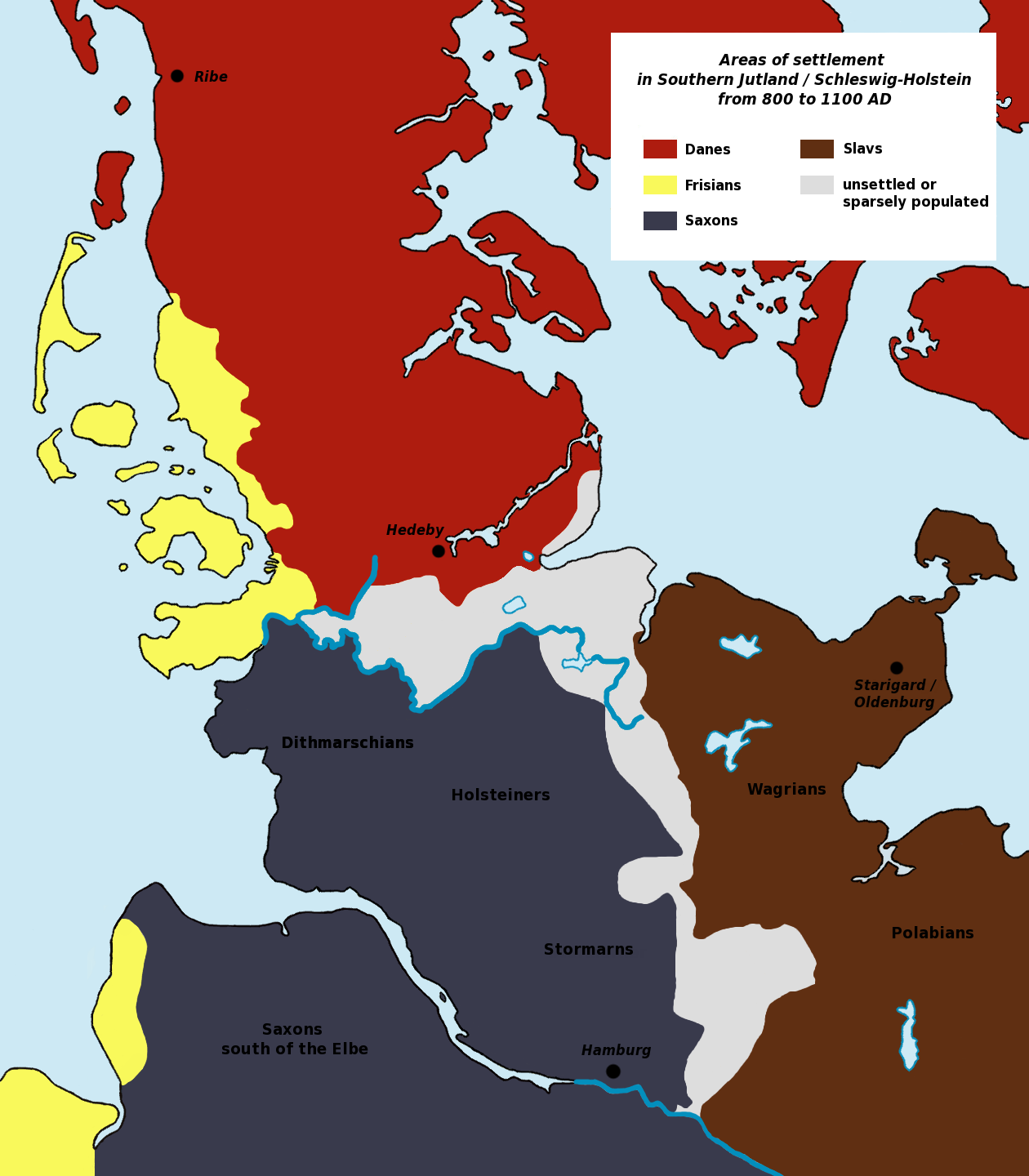
Areas of historic settlements

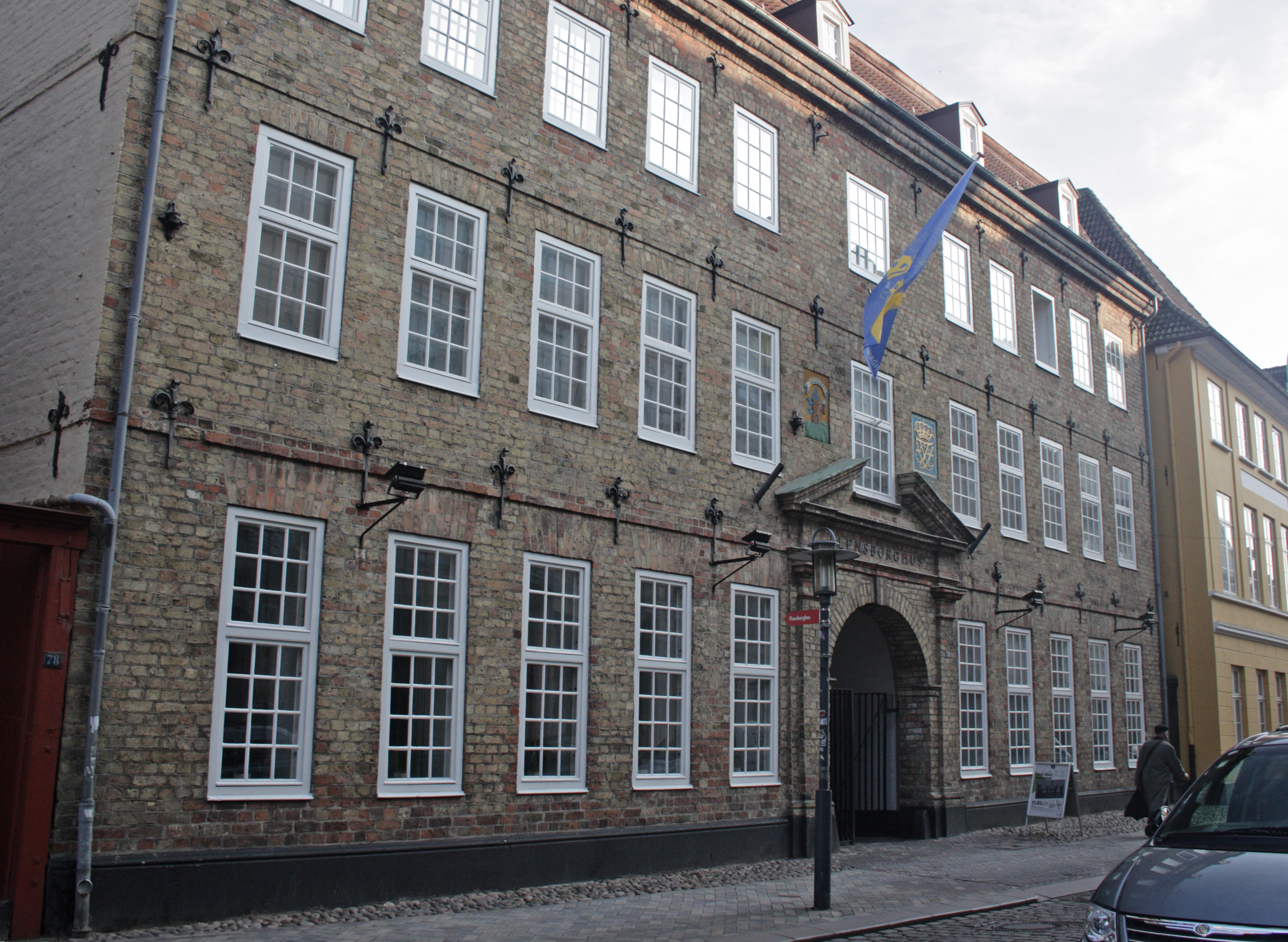
Flensborghus

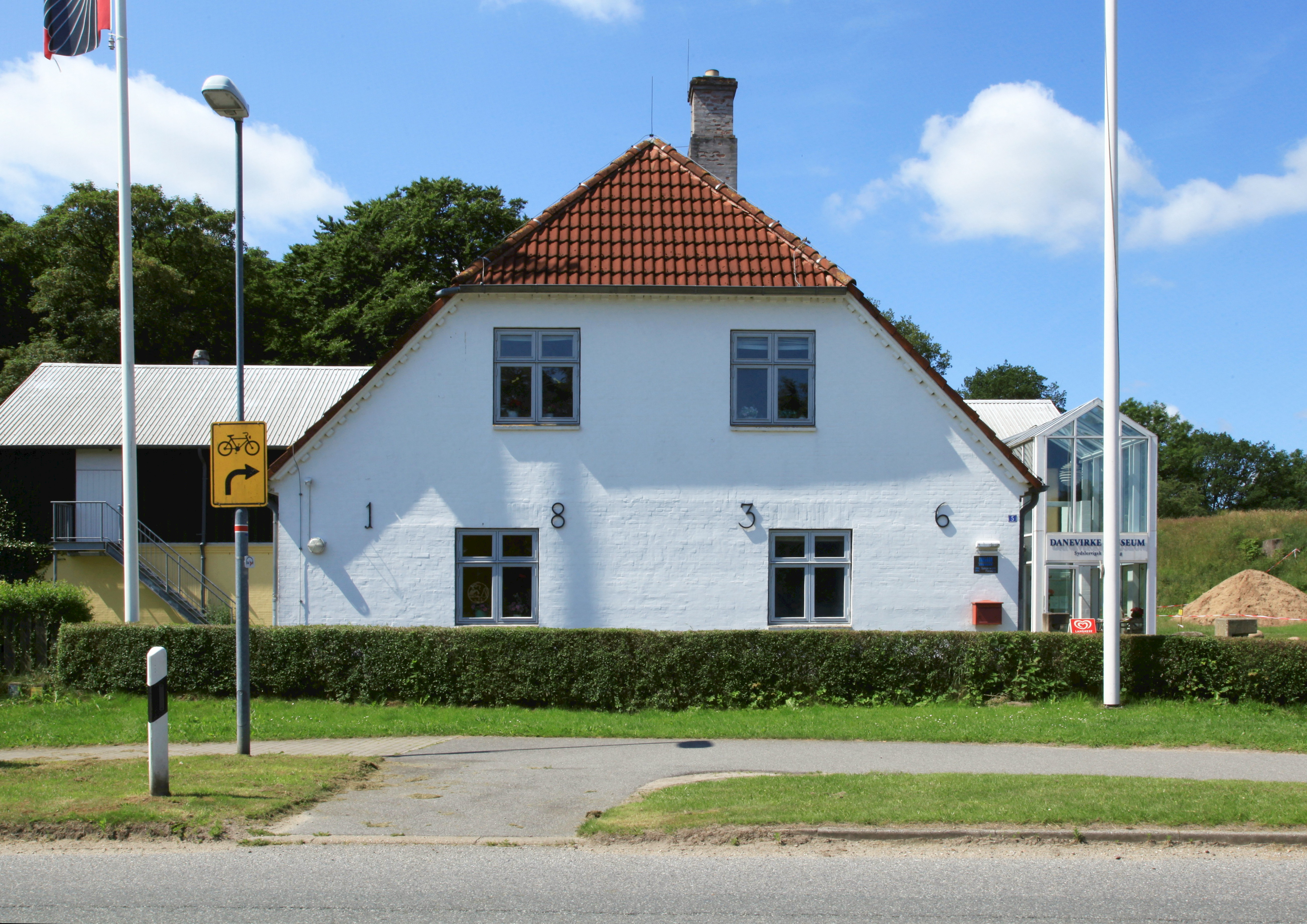
Danevirke Museum near Schleswig (Danish: Slesvig)

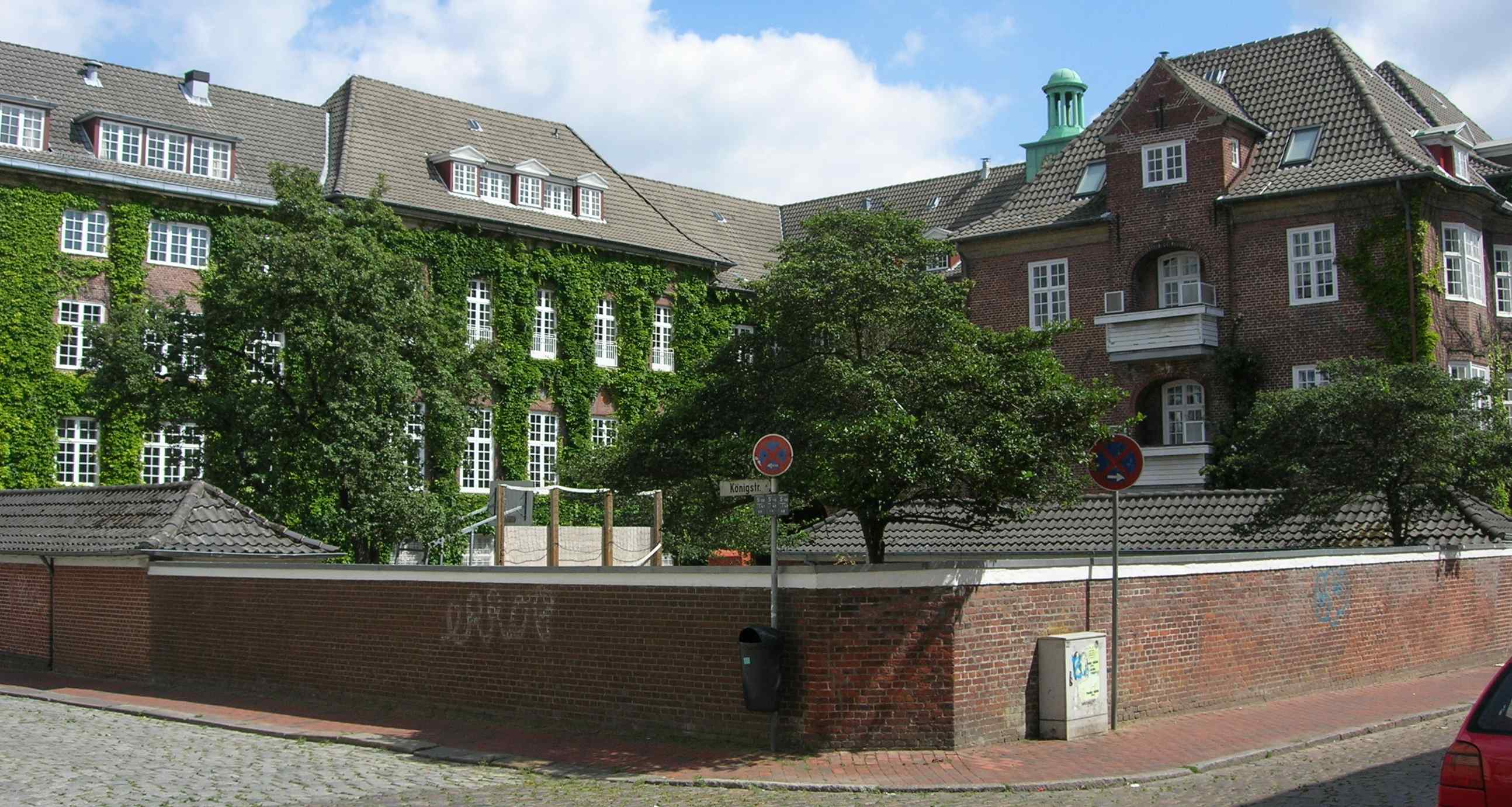
Duborg-Skolen in Flensborg

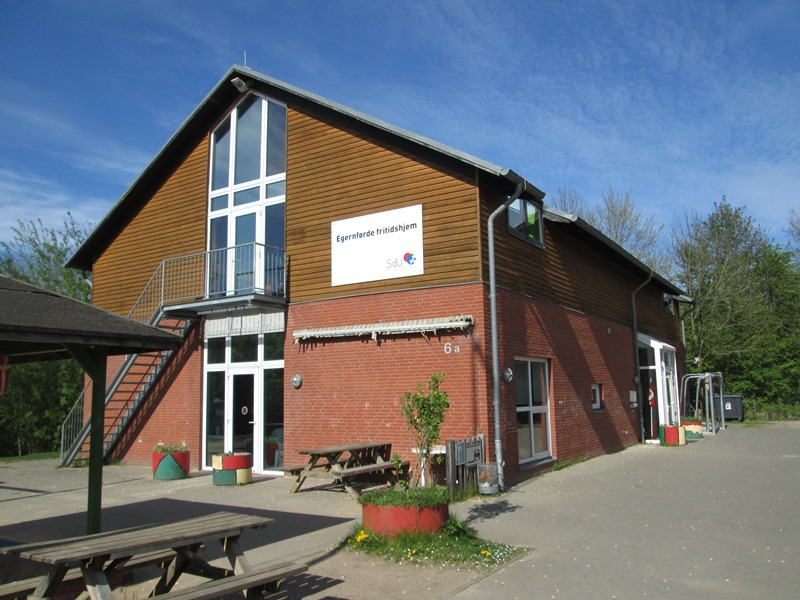
Danish after school club in Eckernförde (Danish: Egernførde, Egernfjord)

The Danish ethnic minority in Southern Schleswig, Germany, has existed by this name since 1920, when the Schleswig Plebiscite split German-ruled Schleswig into two parts: Northern Schleswig with a Danish majority and a German minority was united with Denmark, while Southern Schleswig remained a part of Germany and had a German majority and Danish and Frisian minority populations. Their historic roots go back to the beginning of Danish settlement after the emigration of the Angles. One of the most common names they use to describe themselves is danske sydslesvigere (English: Danish South Schleswigians; German: Dänische Südschleswiger).

Denmark has continued to support the minority financially. Danish schools and organizations have been run in Flensborg since 1920, and since 1926 throughout the greater region. Before the adoption of the democratic Weimar Constitution it was not allowed to teach in another language than German in school (apart from religious education lessons).

== Overview ==
The history of the Danish minority dates back to the Danish settlement of the region in the late Iron Age. The first ethnic Danes settled in Southern Schleswig in the 7th century. One of the first Danish cities, Hedeby, was founded around the year 800. The Danevirke between Hollingstedt and the Eckernförde bay was a Danish border wall towards Germany.

Schleswig (Southern Jutland) was still a part of the Kingdom of Denmark in the Viking Age. It first became a fiefdom of Denmark in the 13th century. Old Danish was spoken north of a line between the Eider, Treene and Eckernförde Bay. But in the 17th, 18th and up to the 19th centuries there was a language shift from Danish and North Frisian dialects to Low German and later to High German as common speech in Southern Schleswig. Many German-minded Schleswigians therefore have ethnic Danish roots. At the same time a conflict grew between German and Danish National Liberals, that culminated in two German-Danish wars in the 19th century.

After the Second Schleswig War Schleswig became part of a German state for the first time, and accordingly a Danish minority organized itself. A plebiscite in 1920 officially reunited Northern Schleswig with Denmark, while Southern Schleswig remained a part of Germany. As a result, a German minority emerged in Northern Schleswig, while a smaller Danish minority remained in Southern Schleswig.

The size of the Danish population in Southern Schleswig has historically been subject to repeated fluctuations. For example, Danish was still spoken north of a line Schleswig-Husum up to around 1800, but later this line shifted northward. After the German-Danish War in 1864, about 200,000 of 400,000 inhabitants were Danish; by the year 1900 about 60,000 of them had emigrated.

While after the 1920-plebiscite between 6,000 and 20,000 Danes found themselves in Southern Schleswig and even more than 12,000 people had voted for Denmark in the second voting zone in 1920, about 8,100 were organised in the Danish association (Den Slesvigske Forening) in 1924, but this number declined to only about the same 3,000 under National Socialism by the end of the World War II.

After World War II, more people joined or rejoined the Danish minority. This is reflected e.g. in the number of members of the Southern Schleswig Association (Sydslesvigsk Forening), which reached to their climax almost 70,000 members in 1948. The Danish political party got almost 99,500 votes in 1947. Many hoped for reunification with Denmark, but the Danish government declared as early as 1945 that the border was fixed. So, the Danish government and the British Occupation Zone governors both opposed Southern Schleswig rejoining the Kingdom, and a referendum was never held in Southern Schleswig. Controversy over the issue divided two of the main Danish parties, and both Venstre leader and Prime Minister Knud Kristensen and Conservative leader John Christmas Møller ultimately broke with their respective parties over the issue. In 1953 the so-called Programm Nord (Northern Programme) was set up by the Schleswig-Holstein state government to help the area economically. This caused the Danish minority to decline until the 1970s. Since then, the minority has slowly been gaining size.

According to official sources, the size of the Danish minority is now given as 50,000 members. Between 8,000 and 10,000 speak Danish every day, between 10,000 and 20,000 of them have Danish as their mother tongue. Also many Schleswigians on both sides of the border are of mixed extraction. A 2015 study by the University of Hamburg identified around 104,000 Danish people in northern Germany, around 42,000 of whom lived in Southern Schleswig itself.

With the Copenhagen-Bonn Declarations in 1955, both the Danish and the German minority were granted minority rights. The declarations reaffirmed e.g. the right to self-identification and stated that an individual's membership of the German minority in Denmark or the Danish minority in Germany may not be a matter of scrutiny from the respective governments. So, membership in one of the national minorities in Northern and Southern Schleswig is not based primarily on cultural markers such as language, but on self-identification. Today there are 43 Danish schools, 57 Danish kindergartens and one Folk high school (Jaruplund Højskole) in Southern Schleswig. There are also various cultural and sports clubs, churches (Danish Church in Southern Schleswig), libraries, a museum, scout groups (Dansk Spejderkorps Sydslesvig) and a Danish daily newspaper (Flensborg Avis).

The Danish minority is also represented by the South Schleswig Voter Federation (SSW) in the Diet (Landtag) of Schleswig-Holstein and the German federal parliament. The SSW is not subject to the general requirement of exceeding a 5% hurdle to gain proportional seats in either the state or federal parliaments. However, it must obtain enough votes that are required for a mandate. In the 2022 Schleswig-Holstein state election, the SSW received 5.7% of the votes and four seats. The SSW is also represented in several municipal councils, and in the 1949, 2021, and 2025 elections won a single seat in the national Bundestag.

== See also ==
- DGF Flensborg
- North Schleswig Germans – German minority in Northern Schleswig
- North Frisians – Frisians on the west coast of Schleswig
- Danish Protest Pig – red and white pig breed, bred by South Schleswig Danes after they were forbidden to fly the Danish flag
