= Egunkaria =

Former Basque-language newspaper

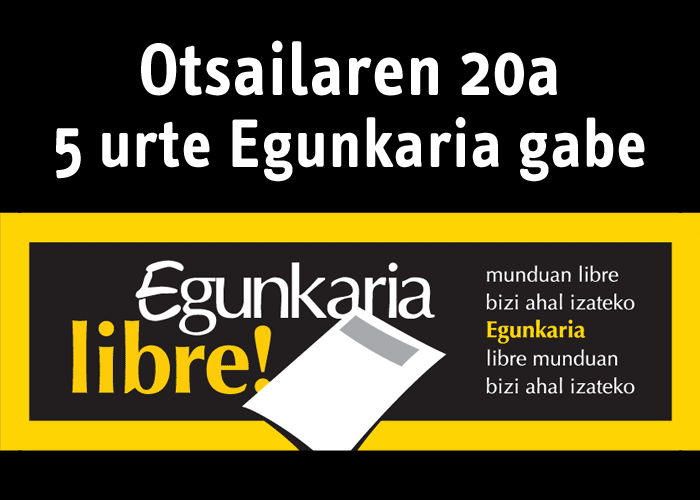

Egunkaria (Basque for The Daily) for thirteen years was the only fully Basque language newspaper in circulation until it was closed down on 20 February 2003 by the Spanish authorities due to allegations of an illegal association with ETA, the armed Basque separatist group. After seven years, on 15 April 2010 the defendants were acquitted on all charges related to ties to ETA. The issue of damages for the closure of the newspaper (which no longer operates) remains open, as well as the alleged torture of the members of the newspaper's executive board during detention.

== History and profile ==
Egunkaria was established in 1990 as the only Basque-language daily newspaper in the Basque Country (there had already been bilingual newspapers and monolingual weeklies). The founders initially expected, when launched in 1990, to reach a circulation of 8,000 to 15,000 copies and 40,000 potential readers, a goal later achieved, later growing into a widely respected publication as well as a meeting point for the Basque speaking community. The paper was sold in both the French and Spanish parts of the Basque Country and its revenue from sales and advertising was complemented by subsidies from the Basque regional government.

== Police operation and closure ==
Footage of the demonstration to denounce the raid and closure of the newspaper (San Sebastián)

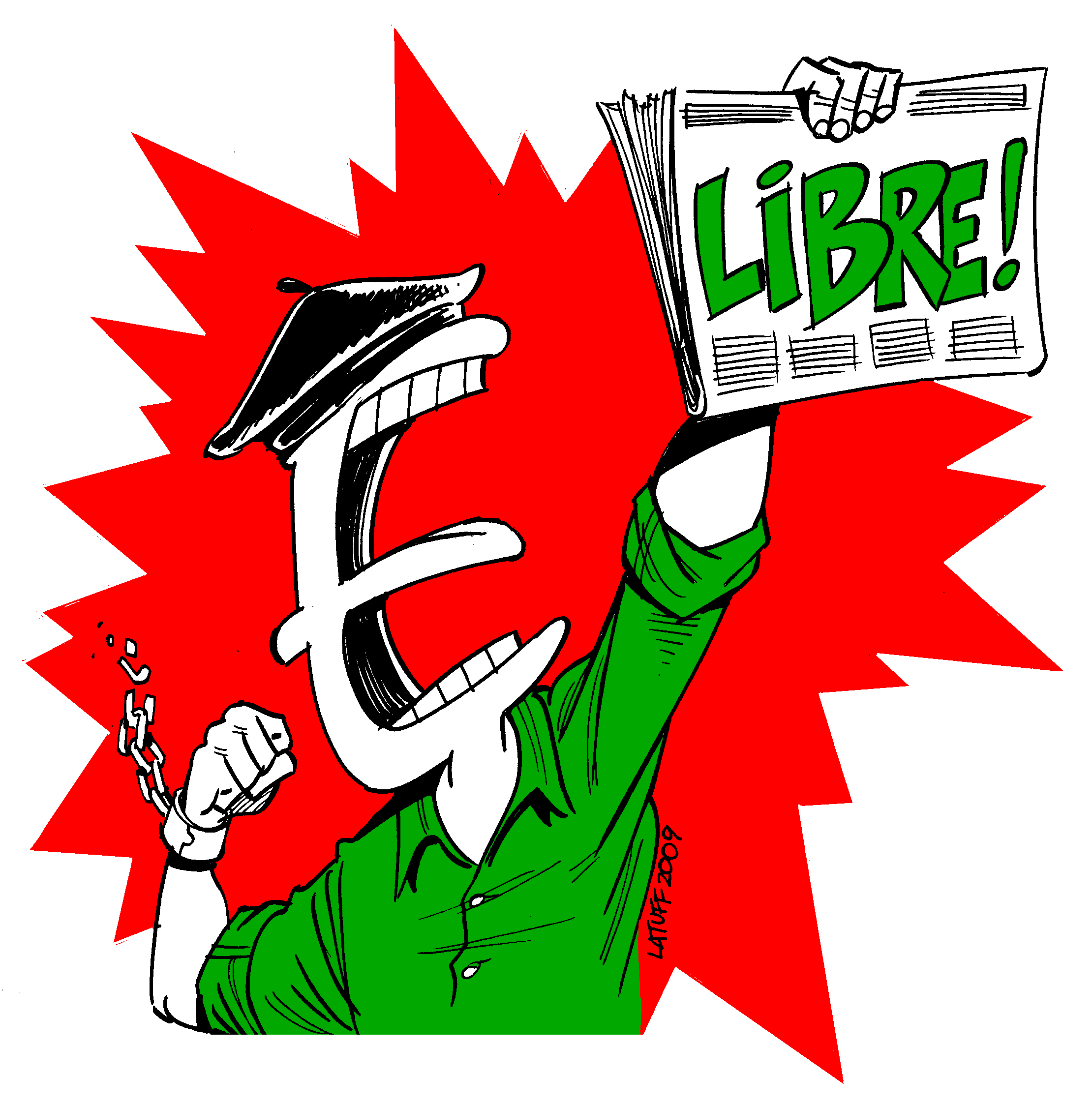
Cartoon against the closure of Egunkaria

=== Closure in police operation ===
On 20 February 2003, the Spanish Civil Guard on orders from Juan del Olmo – a Spanish investigating judge in the Audiencia Nacional – raided the newspaper's offices in Andoain and other delegations, seized documents and computers, and froze the newspaper's assets. In addition, ten individuals who were or had been members of staff were arrested in dawn raids and detained. The operation was launched under the political-juridical umbrella "Everything is ETA" implemented by the Spanish Conservatives in office. According to the incumbent Spanish Minister of Interior Ángel Acebes, "the closure aims at defending the freedom of expression and thinking in their language". Minister of Justice José María Michavila labelled the newspaper "an instrument for terrorist action".

The redaction issued an improvised new daily, Egunero ("Every day"), with the help of competitors Diario de Noticias, Gara and El Diario Vasco. In June, a new fully-Basque daily Berria ("The news"/"The new one") appeared.

In December 2004, Iñaki Uria, Joan Mari Torrealdai, Txema Auzmendi, Xabier Alegria, Pello Zubiria, Xabier Oleaga, and Martxelo Otamendi were arrested for forming an "illegal association" at the time of Egunkaria's establishment, and for "membership of, or collaboration with, ETA". Following their detention, at the doors of the prison, the daily director Martxelo Otamendi denounced live on Basque public TV that he had been subjected to torture in custody and that he heard other people being tortured too. That had a deep impact in Basque society. In two days hundreds of thousands of people marched in San Sebastian against the closure of Egunkaria, in the biggest demonstration of the Basque Country in decades.

Aznar's government refused to launch an investigation, instead initiating prosecution against Egunkaria's director, claiming that by denouncing torture he was allegedly "collaborating with ETA". The lawsuit against Otamendi was then filed by the Secretary Deputy of Interior María Dolores de Cospedal; the lawsuit stalled soon after.

All detainees were later cleared of all charges and released. The newspaper was effectively forced into liquidation as its assets were sold off by court-appointed administrators, meaning that regardless of the outcome of the case, Egunkaria had ceased to exist. Due to irregularities and a breach of guarantees for the defendants, all decisions made since April 2007 related to the economic proceedings have been overturned. The bilingual (Spanish-Basque) nationalist leftist newspaper Egin was also closed under similar circumstances.

The closure of Egunkaria resulted in grass-roots indignation, with widespread criticism coming from different circles (Basque regional government, reputed writers, Spanish journalists, etc.) towards the Spanish authorities. The writer Salman Rushdie denounced the closure as "appalling".

=== Final verdict ===
In 2010, the final and unanimous sentence by the Criminal Court of the Audiencia Nacional states that there was no grounds to have the newspaper closed. The sentence confirms that "the narrow and erroneous view according to which everything that has to do with the Basque language and with culture in that language is promoted and/or controlled by ETA leads to an incorrect assessment of facts and figures, and to the inconsistency of the accusation." It goes on to note that the closure was an "interference with press freedom". Finally, the sentence declares that "the allegations have not proven that the defendants have the slightest relation with ETA, and this determines in itself the acquittal with all pronouncements favorable to the defendants." In 2012, the European Court for Human Rights sentenced against Spain for not investigating properly the torture accusations raised by the detainees.

== See also ==
- Berria
