= Berria =

Basque-language newspaper

- Type: Daily newspaper
- Format: Broadsheet
- Owner: Euskal Editorea SL
- Founder: Euskarazko Komunikazio Taldea (EKT) (Now called Berria Taldea)
- Publisher: Euskal Editorea SL
- President: Beatriz Zabalondo
- Editor: Martxelo Otamendi
- General manager: Iban Arregi
- Staff writers: Enekoitz Esnaola, Gari Goikoetxea, Maite Asensio Lozano, Arantxa Iraola, Iñigo Astiz, Mikel Peruarena Ansa
- Founded: June 21, 2003
- Political alignment: Left-wing
- Language: Basque
- Headquarters: Martin Ugalde kultur parkea (Gudarien etorbidea, 20140 Andoain.)
- Country: Basque Country
- Circulation: 20,000 - 25,000 daily
- Sister newspapers: HITZA
- ISSN: 1696-5108
- Website: www.berria.eus

Berria (lit. 'News') is the only daily newspaper published wholly in the Basque language and which can be read in the entirety of the Basque country. It was created after the closure of the previous Basque language newspaper, Egunkaria, by the Spanish government, after being accused of having ties with ETA.

Berria is published daily, with the exception of Monday. The first issue was released on 21 June 2003. The newspaper's headquarters is in Andoain, Gipuzkoa, in the autonomous Basque region, Euskadi, in northern Spain. It also has offices in Vitoria-Gasteiz, Pamplona, Bilbao and Bayonne.

The newspaper is a member of MIDAS (European Association of Daily Newspapers in Minority and Regional Languages).

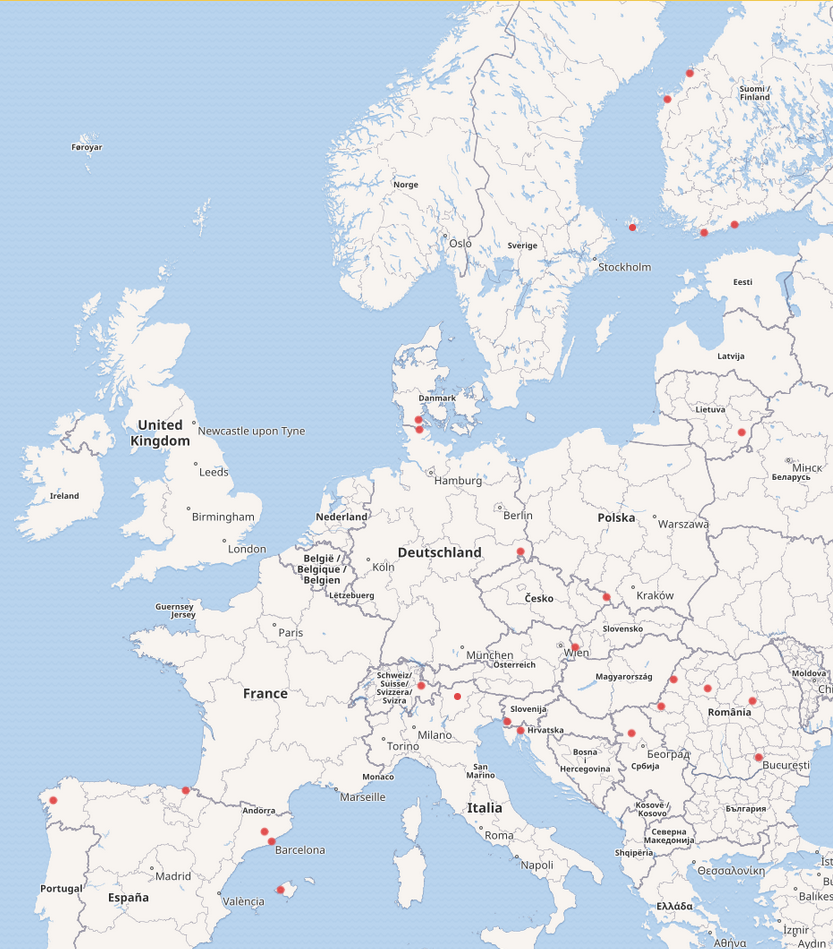
Members of MIDAS. Interactive map
