= El Temps =

Weekly news magazine in Spain

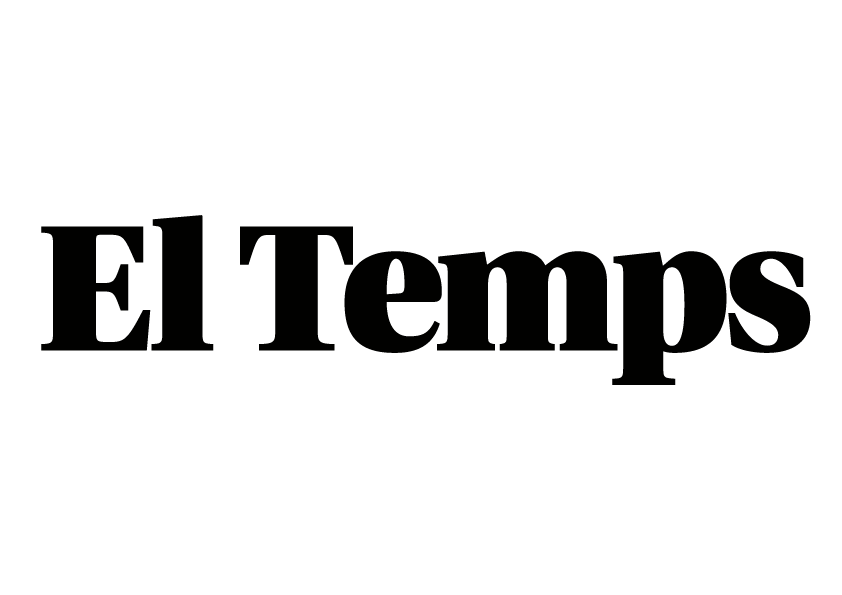
- Editor: Eliseu Climent
- Categories: Newsmagazine
- Frequency: Weekly
- Circulation: 27,000
- Founded: 1984
- Company: Edicions del País Valencià
- Country: Spain
- Based in: Valencia
- Language: Catalan
- Website: www.eltemps.cat

El Temps (Valencian pronunciation: [el ˈtems]; 'The Times') is a weekly newsmagazine, published in Valencia by Edicions del País Valencià since 1984. It is distributed throughout the whole Països Catalans. It is edited by Eliseu Climent. The publication has offices in Barcelona, Valencia and Palma.

El Temps has become a reference to the Catalan Countries, where it has attained great prestige, so that in 2001, it achieved a circulation of 25,000 copies. In the mid 1990s, under the guidance of Vicent Partal, it was one of the first news media in Catalan to be present on internet.

== Contributors ==
- Fabià Estapé
- Glòria Marcos
- Joan F. Mira
- Josep Maria Terricabras
- Martí Domínguez
- Miquel Payeras
- Sebastià Alzamora

== Awards ==
- 1994: Gabriel Alomar i Villalonga Award of the Premis 31 de Desembre from Obra Cultural Balear.
- 1996: Premi d'Honor Lluís Carulla
