= Vasabladet =

Swedish language daily newspaper in Finland

- Type: Daily newspaper
- Format: Tabloid
- Owner: HSS Media Ab
- Editor: Niklas Nyberg
- Founded: 1856; 170 years ago
- Political alignment: Neutral
- Language: Swedish
- Headquarters: Vaasa
- Circulation: 6,500 (2025)
- Website: www.vasabladet.fi

Vasabladet (abbr. VBL) is a Swedish language regional daily newspaper in Ostrobothnia, Finland. In terms of circulation, it is the second largest Swedish newspaper in Finland, behind Hufvudstadsbladet.

== History and profile ==
Vasabladet is the second oldest newspaper in Finland which is still in circulation (following Åbo Underrättelser), the first edition having been published on 7 May 1856. Until 1939, its name was Wasabladet, reflecting the old spelling of the Swedish name for Vaasa. Its headquarters is located in Vaasa (Vasa in Swedish).

Vasabladet is part of and is published by HSS Media. The paper is published six times per week. In May 2013, parts of the online news content were locked behind a hard paywall.

In 1989 Vasabladet sold 27,000 copies. In 2009 its circulation was 22,493 copies, most of which were sold in Vaasa and surrounding areas in Ostrobothnia. The circulation of the paper was 19,325 copies in 2013.

The newspaper is a member of MIDAS (European Association of Daily Newspapers in Minority and Regional Languages).
