= Dolomiten =

- Front page, 6 December 2013
- Type: Daily newspaper
- Format: Berliner
- Owner: Athesia
- Editor-in-chief: Elmar Pichler Rolle
- Founded: 1882
- Language: German
- Headquarters: Bolzano
- Circulation: 26,300 (as of January 2026)Federazione Italiana Editori Giornali (FIEG)
- Website: dolomiten.it

Dolomiten is an Italian local daily newspaper, based in Bozen/Bolzano. It is the oldest and most important German-language newspaper published in South Tyrol, a region where German is spoken by the majority of the inhabitants. The title takes the German name of the local mountain range, the Dolomites.

== History ==
Founded in 1882 as the Der Tiroler, the paper was renamed Der Landsmann in August 1923 after the ban of use the "Tirolo" name in all its forms by the fascist government. In October 1925, the newspaper was forced to close due to its anti-fascist stance and reopened two years after, only under heavy and restrictive terms, as the media outlet of the catholic association Azione Cattolica, through the branch at the Roman Catholic Archdiocese of Trento and in 1926 was renamed with the present name Dolomiten. In 1943, the newspaper was closed again, by the German-Nazi administration in Italy, and a number of journalists were deported to the Dachau concentration camp. The publication was reopened only in 1945, after obtaining the permission by the Allied military government. Today, the newspaper publishes also a number of weekly and monthly inserts, focused on entertainment and financial issues.

The newspaper is a member of MIDAS (European Association of Daily Newspapers in Minority and Regional Languages).
