= German minority in Denmark =

Ethnic group

Germans in Denmark Danske tyskere Dänische Deutsche Hjemmetyskere
- (Germany) (Denmark)

Total population
- 15,000-20,000

Regions with significant populations
- North Schleswig, Copenhagen, Bornholm, throughout Denmark

Languages
- German Low Saxon, Danish (South Jutlandic)

Religion
- Christianity (Roman Catholicism, Protestantism), Judaism, Irreligious

Related ethnic groups
- Other Germans, Danes, Frisians, Dutch people, Norwegians, Faroese people

Approximately 15,000 people in Denmark belong to an autochthonous ethnic German minority traditionally referred to as hjemmetyskere, meaning "Home Germans" in Danish, and as Nordschleswiger in German. They are Danish citizens and most self-identify as ethnic Germans. They generally speak Low Saxon and South Jutlandic Danish as their home languages.

Unrelated to the North Schleswig Germans, there are also a substantial number of citizens of Germany who live in Denmark under the aegis of the Schengen Area and have no connection to the historical German inhabitants of the Duchy of Schleswig.

== History ==
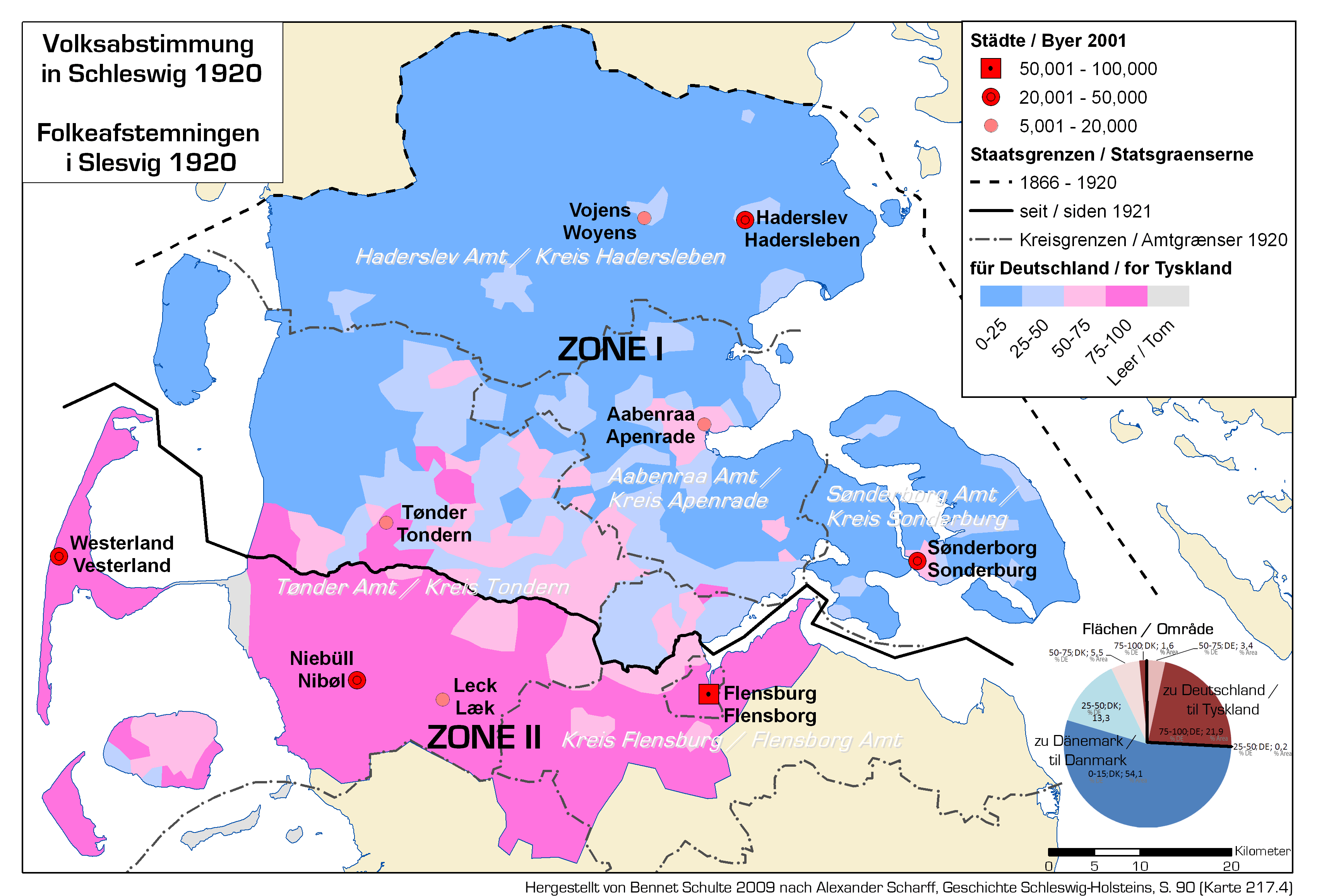
Results of the plebiscite

In 1920, in the aftermath of World War I, two Schleswig Plebiscites were held in the northernmost part of the Prussian Province of Schleswig-Holstein (the northern half of the former Duchy of Schleswig). The plebiscites were held in two zones that were defined by Denmark according to the ideas of the Danish historian Hans Victor Clausen. The northern Zone I was delineated according to Clausen's estimation of where the local rural population identified itself as Danish, a survey published in 1891. Clausen travelled extensively on both sides of the eventual border, in an attempt determine which communities that would vote for a return to Danish rule, and concluded that this was the case north of the Skelbækken creek, where most rural communities were both Danish-speaking and pro-Danish, while the communities south of this line were overwhelmingly pro-German (though some of these communities were also primarily Danish-speaking). Near Tønder, he deviated from this system, and included the German-majority towns of Tønder and Højer into the northern sector for economic purposes, and to achieve a line following a dyke, consequently this line followed the dyke south of Højer.

North Schleswig and other German territories lost in both World Wars are shown in black, present-day Germany is marked dark grey on this 1914 map.

The northern Zone I voted en bloc, i.e. as a unit with the majority deciding, and the result was 75% for Denmark and 25% for Germany, consequently resulting in a German minority north of the new border. In the southern Zone II, each parish/town voted for its own future allegiance, and all districts in Zone II showed German majorities. The eventual border was delineated virtually identically with the border between Zones I and II.

In the northern Zone (Zone I), 25% of the population, i.e. around 40,000 people voted to remain part of Germany, the German North Schleswigers having their centres in the towns of Tønder, Aabenraa, and Sønderborg, but also in a rural district between Tønder and Flensburg near the new border, most notably in Tinglev. Smaller German minorities existed in Haderslev and Christiansfeld (both towns with Danish majorities). Sønderborg and Aabenraa were strongly dominated by both nationalities (c. 55% Germans and 45% Danes). In Sønderborg, the German majority was partially due to a local military garrison, and the German element in this town decreased sharply in the 1920s, after the German garrison had been withdrawn and replaced with a Danish one. Tønder had a vast German majority (c. 80%) but was included in the northern Zone for geographical and economic reasons, and because of the small population of this (and the other) North Schleswig towns.

Between 1920–1939, the North Schleswig Germans elected Johannes Schmidt-Wodder their representative in the Danish Parliament with c. 13–15% of the North Schleswig votes, indicating that the share of North Schleswigers that identified as Germans had decreased when compared with the 1920 referendum.

Since 1945, the North Schleswig Germans have been presented by Bund Deutscher Nordschleswiger, a cultural organisation, and continued to elect a member of Parliament until the 1950s.

The North Schleswig Germans are currently represented in the municipal councils of Aabenraa, Tønder, and Sønderborg. Bund Deutscher Nordschleswiger estimates the current number of North Schleswig Germans to be around 15,000, i.e. around 6% of the North Schleswig population of c. 250,000. This is a far smaller group than the 50,000 Danes who live in Southern Schleswig, where, for instance, Flensborg Avis, a newspaper in Danish, is printed every day.

== Politics ==
Schleswig Party is a political party that represents the German minority interests in Denmark.

The potential installation of bilingual signs has become an issue in the region. A bilingual sign was installed in Haderslev (German: Hadersleben) in 2015, but it was pulled down within a week. The mayor donated it to a museum rather than try to reinstall it. Campaigns for bilingual signs in other towns have failed. The Council of Europe has suggested that the installation of such signs would promote intercultural understanding.

== See also ==
- Denmark–Germany relations
- Potato Germans
- Danish minority of Southern Schleswig
- Germans in Finland
- Germans in Sweden
