= Arkaitz Goikoetxea =

Arkaitz Goikoetxea Basabe
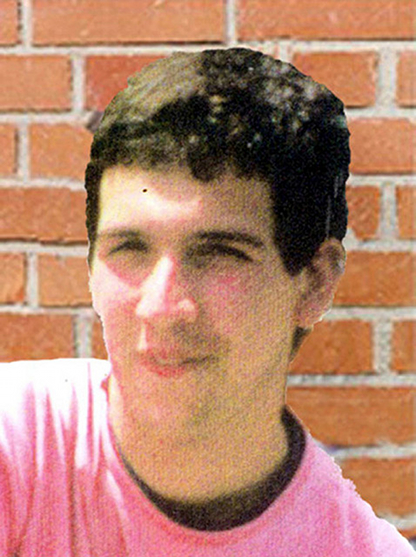
- Born: May 4, 1980 (age 46); Getxo, Biscay
- Status: Jailed
- Known for: Head of ETA's Biscay cell
- Term: 2007-2008

Arkaitz Goikoetxea Basabe (born May 4, 1980) is a member of the Basque terrorist organisation ETA. He began his violent activity at the age of 15 as a member of the street violence groups known as kale borroka. He was arrested several times between 2001 and 2002, and joined ETA in 2005.

Along with Jurdan Martitegi, Goikoetxea led the most active cell of the organisation after the end of the 2006 ceasefire. He is accused of participating in several attacks in the province of Biscay between 2007 and 2008, and was arrested in July 2008, when the whole cell was dismantled. He has been imprisoned since then.

== Militancy ==
Goikoetxea was born in the town of Getxo, Biscay, although some sources state he was born in Barakaldo. His brother Zigor has been arrested several times for street violence attacks and was jailed in 2008 for death threats against a People's Party councillor in Getxo. He was released in 2009. Goikoetxea's parents' home in Getxo was attacked and set on fire on July 17, 2009. Spanish nationalist organisation Falange y Tradición claimed responsibility for the attack, which left no injuries.

=== Kale borroka ===
Goikoetxea started his kale borroka activity in 1995, and Ertzaintza police officers raided his home in connection with these attacks on May 3, 1998. He was not arrested and five days later he presented himself at the Spanish National High Court in Madrid, and was set free. On April 1, 2000 he suffered hand amputation while preparing an explosive device, and was admitted to hospital under arrest and later released. He was arrested by the National Police Corps on March 20, 2001, being accused of setting fire to a post office in Berango in 1997. He was released as he was still a minor when the attack occurred. He was once again arrested twice in late 2002, for participating in bomb attacks against Civil Guard barracks in Algorta and Galdakao. In 2004, he went on trial and was acquitted of taking part in a molotov cocktail attack in Amorebieta in 1998. Goikoetxea was also accused of participating in a molotov cocktail attack against two Ertzaintza officers in Portugalete on August 5, 2001 and failed to show up in court on May 5, 2005. He fled to France and became a member of ETA.

=== ETA activity ===
Goikoetxea started his activities in ETA in 2005. Two years later, Txeroki ordered him and Jurdan Martitegi to form a new cell in Biscay. The cell, named Askatasun Haizea, was created in February 2007, when ETA was still officially on a ceasefire. The first attack in which Goikoetxea participated was a car bomb attack against a Civil Guard barracks in Durango on August 24, which left two police officers injured. This was ETA's first attack after the end of the ceasefire in June. In late 2007 and early 2008, Goikoetxea and the Biscay cell, carried out several attacks around the Basque Country, targeting courthouses or political offices. In 2008, Goikoetxea placed three car bombs: in Calahorra, La Rioja on March 21, in Legutiano, Álava, which killed a Civil Guard on May 14 and in Getxo on May 19. He was at first believed to be the killer of Isaías Carrasco.

== Arrest and trials ==
On July 22, 2008, Civil Guard members arrested Goikoetxea in his home in Bilbao. Most of the cell members were also arrested, and the cell was dismantled. The operation was led by Judge Baltasar Garzón. On the following days, Goikoetxea led Civil Guards officers to an ETA arm cache with 125 kg (276 lb) of explosive devices in Santo Domingo de la Calzada, La Rioja.

On December 4, 2008 Goikoetxea appeared on the National High Court for the 2001 Portugalete attack, and on February 2, he was charged with attempt to kill two officers and was sentenced to 22 years of jail. On November 23, 2010 the trial for the Leguatiano attack was held, with Goikoetxea facing 534 years and six months of jail for "terrorist assassination, 26 attempts of assassination, terrorist ravages and car stealing".

== Attacks ==
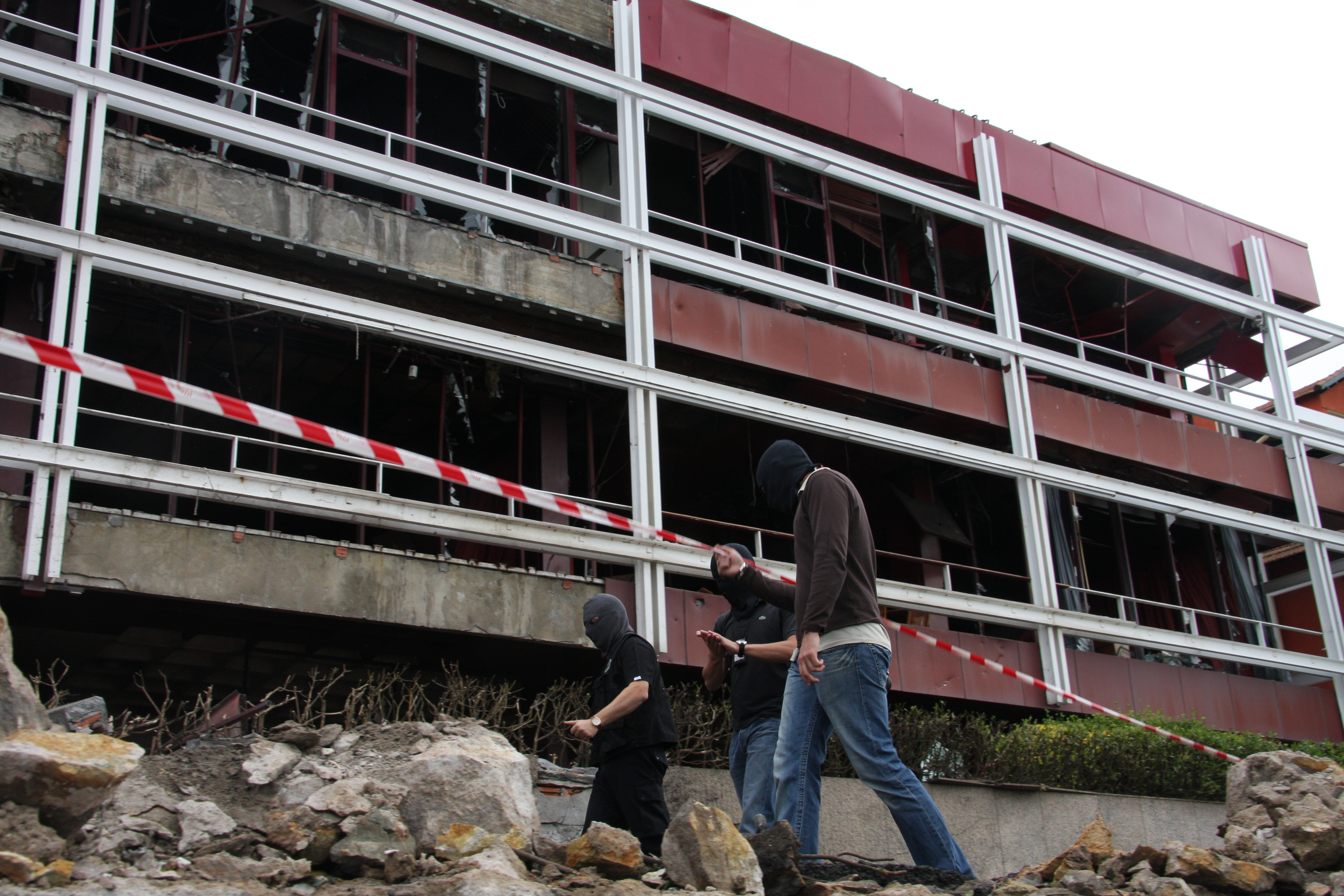
Car bomb attack in Getxo

Goikoetxea is believed to have participated in the following attacks:

- August 24, 2007: A van bomb loaded with 100 kg (220 lb) of explosives goes off in a Civil Guard barracks in Durango, Biscay, injuring two Civil Guard officers.
- September 24, 2007: A 5 kg (11 lb) bomb explodes in front of an Ertzaintza police station in Zarautz, Gipuzkoa. No one was injured.
- November 11, 2007: Two bombs fail to go off in a courthouse in Zarautz. Two police officers were later wounded when manipulating the bombs.
- December 24, 2007: A bomb explodes in front of a Socialist party office in Balmaseda, Biscay. No one was injured.
- February 29, 2008: A bomb explodes in a Socialist party office in the town of Derio, Biscay. No one was injured
- March 21, 2008: A car bomb explodes outside a Civil Guard barracks in Calahorra, La Rioja, injuring three.
- May 14: A van bomb explodes in a Civil Guard barracks in Legutiano, Alava, killing one policeman and injuring four.
- May 19, 2008: A car bomb explodes in Getxo. A boat club suffered great damage, but no one was injured.

== See also ==
- Miguel de Garikoitz Aspiazu Rubina, head of the military unit at the time Goikoetxea was in ETA
- Francisco Javier López Peña, political chief of ETA between 2004 and 2008
