= Jurdan Martitegi =

Basque nationalist

Jurdan Martitegi Lizaso
- Born: May 10, 1980 (age 46); Durango, Biscay
- Status: Jailed
- Known for: Head of ETA military commandos
- Term: 2002-2009

Jurdan Martitegi Lizaso (born May 10, 1980, in Durango, Vizcaya, Spain) is a member of the terrorist Basque nationalist group Euskadi Ta Askatasuna (ETA). He is best known as the head of the military/commando unit of the group since late 2008 until April 18, 2009, when he was arrested by French police. He is considered to be one of the most dangerous members of ETA, considered a terrorist organization by the European Union, with police describing him as "extremely violent".

He gained prominence in the military section of ETA by leading the 'commando Vizcaya' (Biscay Command) after the 2006 ceasefire along with Arkaitz Goikoetxea and rose to the highest level of ETA's military leadership following the December 2008 arrest of Aitzol Iriondo alias Gurbita who had replaced Miguel de Garikoitz Aspiazu Rubina alias Txeroki, arrested less than a month before.

== ETA activity ==
=== Kale borroka ===
Before joining ETA, Jurdan Martitegi had a wide record of kale borroka acts. On February 12, 1998, he presented himself in front of Baltasar Garzón, after being accused of several street violence acts during 1997. He was shortly released but later accused of taking part in a molotov attack against an Ertzaintza police station in Amorebieta. In 2000 he was arrested after attacking a concessionaire in Iurreta and a bank and Guardia Civil barracks in Galdakao, in which a policeman was wounded. He was arrested again on March 5, 2001, after placing an explosive at the Durango courts and spent some time at the Alcalá Meco and Daroca prisons.

=== Comando member ===
Martitegi is believed to have joined ETA after he was released from prison. He left his Durango home in 2006 after he knew police were searching him. He joined the 'commando Vizcaya' after the 2006 ceasefire and carried several attacks along with Arkaitz Goikoetxea, including the bombing of Civil Guard's cuartel in Durango on August 24, 2007, a bomb attack in front of a courthouse in Sestao on December 16, 2007, a car bomb explosion outside a Guardia Civil barracks in Calahorra, Rioja on March 21, 2008 and a van bomb placed in front of a Guardia Civil barracks at Legutiano, Álava, which killed one policeman, Juan Manuel Piñuel Villalón, and injured four. He is also believed to have carried a failed attack outside Getxo courthouse on November 11, 2007. According to police he's the main suspect of killing Spanish Socialist Workers' Party councillor Isaías Carrasco on March 7, 2008, as eyewitnesses described the killer as a 'tall man', a description which fits with Martitegi's two meters height.

Jurdan Martitegi carried all of the attacks along with his fellow partner Arkaitz Goikoetxea, who was arrested on July 22, 2008, after Spanish police dismantled the Vizcaya cell. Martitegi was able to escape before police arrested nine other suspects.

Police reported that Martitegi and Txeroki had trained several ETA members of the Nafarroa cell in Hendaia during 2008. Four days after this cell was arrested, on October 30, ETA bombed the University of Navarra, injuring up to twenty-one persons.

=== Military chief ===
In early 2009, Spanish press revealed that ETA's current top leaders Juan Cruz Maiztegui Bengoa, 63, alias Pastor and José Luis Eciolaza Galán alias Dienteputo had entrusted Martitegi to quickly reorganize the commandos and make them ready to commit 'deadly attacks'. Some days later, Spanish police confirmed that ETA had restructured its commandos and that Martitegi would be leading them along with his lieutenant "Andoni Sarasola" and ETA member "Lurgi Mendinueta". Martitegi has already asked his commandos to carry quick attacks, always with car bombs.

Since his work as a military chief ETA has already carried several attacks (see List of ETA attacks in 2009), including the bombing of the Basque television in Bilbao on December 31, 2008, and a van bomb in Madrid on February 8, 2009, which led police to think that ETA has established its first cell in Madrid for about six years.

In February 2009, El Confidencial revealed that police were afraid that Martitegi would try to carry a very big attack to vindicate himself to ETA leaders. Police also warned that ETA's goal was to kill ertzainas during the Basque elections campaign.

Although he officially controlled all of ETA's cells, Martitegi had problems moving in public due to his high stature of more than 1.90 meters, which made him easily detectable.

== See also ==
- Francisco Javier López Peña
