= Barracks of Intxaurrondo =

Police complex of the Guardia Civil in San Sebastián, Spain

Coordinates: 43°18′48″N 1°56′58″E

Inchaurrondo Barracks
- Calle Baratzategi, 60; 20015 San Sebastián in Spain

Site information
- Type: Police complex
- Controlled by: Ministry of the Interior

Site history
- Built: 1978–1979
- Built by: Government of Spain
- In use: 1980–present

Garrison information
- Current commander: Antonio Campos Vivancos
- Occupants: Civil Guard

The Inchaurrondo Barracks, headquarters of the Gipuzkoa Command of the Civil Guard, is a police complex of the Civil Guard located on the outskirts of San Sebastián, Spain. It is named after the Intxaurrondo neighborhood in which it is situated.

For much of the 20th century, it served as the central hub for the Spanish government's counter-terrorism efforts against the terrorist organization ETA, resulting in the deaths of 100 Civil Guard members stationed there by ETA attacks. Most major Spanish police operations against ETA were planned and coordinated from the Inchaurrondo Barracks, with security forces dismantling 278 ETA cells and arresting 1,550 ETA members, 437 of whom were apprehended by agents from the barracks.

Some practices at the barracks were denounced as torture against individuals detained for their links to the terrorist organization, with some convictions, most notably that of the barracks' commander, General Enrique Rodríguez Galindo, who was sentenced to 71 years in prison for the Lasa and Zabala case.

== History ==
=== Beginnings ===
The project to build a new facility for the Civil Guard in San Sebastián was conceived in the late 1970s. Facing difficulties in obtaining construction permits, the UCD government opted to purchase a group of residences and adjacent land in the Intxaurrondo neighborhood, near the A-8 autovía. During the construction of the administrative buildings, the terrorist organization ETA planned to destroy the site with an explosion, leading to the arrest of ETA politico-military member Mikel Amilibia. Congressman Juan María Bandrés denounced that the detainee, who was released due to lack of evidence, had been mistreated by the Civil Guard. The 513th Gipuzkoa Command of the Civil Guard was relocated to the site.

Commissioned in 1980, the complex was initially situated in an open area, as the neighborhood had not yet expanded. Its early years coincided with the Years of Lead, the period when ETA carried out its most brutal and numerous attacks. Inchaurrondo became the primary operations center in the fight against the organization. Civil Guards stationed at the barracks received a salary bonus due to the risk of attacks and pressure from the abertzale community. Over time, security measures were significantly strengthened: the perimeter was fenced, armored guard posts were built, and access points were heavily monitored with agents and security cameras. The facility earned the nickname "Fort Apache" in some circles.

In 1984, Amnesty International issued its first two reports alleging torture of two detainees at the barracks. The Interior Minister, José Barrionuevo, dismissed the allegations as false and requested observers for interrogations. That year, the barracks housed 700 Civil Guards, 250 of whom lived with their families in four apartment blocks within the complex. Most agents lived within the facility, which included sports facilities, a commissary, a barber shop, and a bar.

=== Counter-terrorism ===
The barracks' commander was Enrique Rodríguez Galindo, who joined as a commander in 1980 from Cádiz. In 1986, Inchaurrondo planned the first joint French-Spanish counter-terrorism operation, the Sokoa Operation, which uncovered an ETA weapons arsenal hidden in an industrial warehouse in Hendaye (France), with collaboration from the CIA. The Gipuzkoa Command's successes included the direct or indirect arrest of ETA leaders (Francisco Mujika Garmendia, José Luis Álvarez Santacristina, and Joseba Arregi Erostarbe in 1992; Mikel Antza and Soledad Iparragirre in 2004; Garikoitz Aspiazu, Aitzol Iriondo, and Francisco Javier López Peña in 2008; and Mikel Karrera Sarobe in 2010).

In 1997, agents from the barracks, led by Captain Manuel Sánchez Corbí, participated in the rescue of José Antonio Ortega Lara, who had been held for 532 days in a zulo in an industrial warehouse in Mondragón. They also participated in the search for Ermua councilor Miguel Ángel Blanco, who was kidnapped and murdered by ETA on July 13, 1997.

In 2009, the barracks underwent renovations, inaugurated by Interior Minister Alfredo Pérez Rubalcaba, which included three new buildings: one for administrative purposes, another for transient accommodations, and a third for the Grupo de Acción Rápida (GAR).

Inchaurrondo housed the bulk of the forces tasked with combating ETA. At its peak, it accommodated 2,000 Civil Guards. Between 1980 and 2000, it was targeted in six grenade attacks, and 100 of its members were killed in various operations and attacks. Security forces dismantled 278 ETA cells and arrested 1,550 members, with 437 apprehended by barracks agents. Notable commanders included Antonio Tejero, Enrique Rodríguez Galindo, Ángel Vaquero, Manuel Sánchez Corbí, and Francisco Vázquez. Since 2017, the unit has been led by Colonel Antonio Campos Vivancos.

== Allegations ==
=== Alleged torture ===
According to detainee testimonies, torture was a common practice at Inchaurrondo during ETA's active years. The Basque Institute of Criminology investigated between 4,000 and 5,000 torture cases in the Basque Country from 1960 to 2013, according to its director, Francisco Etxeberria. Journalist Martxelo Otamendi, director of the abertzale newspaper Euskaldunon Egunkaria, which was shut down by court order in 2003, reported to the courts that he was subjected to torture and degrading treatment following his detention at Inchaurrondo. His complaint was dismissed in 2004, and Otamendi and other Egunkaria members appealed to the Constitutional Court. In 2012, the European Court of Human Rights ordered Spain to pay Otamendi €24,000 for failing to effectively investigate his allegations.

The torture allegations prompted the Ministry of the Interior to file a lawsuit in March 2003 against Otamendi and other Egunkaria directors for false accusations, defamation, and libel. Then-Interior Minister Ángel Acebes claimed that alleging torture was part of a strategy recommended by ETA to all its detained members, an accusation included in the lawsuit as a possible charge of collaboration with an armed group. Years later, various media and ETA sources acknowledged that many of these allegations were false, and according to information seized from ETA's leadership, these allegations were part of a strategy to discredit the Spanish police and create tensions among democratic parties. This strategy included systematic torture allegations and even self-harm as pressure tactics.

=== GAL: Lasa and Zabala ===
The GAL (Anti-terrorist Liberation Groups) emerged in 1983 as a paramilitary group practicing state terrorism or "dirty war" against ETA and its supporters. Between 1983 and 1987, they committed 27 murders and several kidnappings. The kidnapping and subsequent murder of José Antonio Lasa and José Ignacio Zabala in October 1983, followed by the Segundo Marey kidnapping shortly after, marked the beginning of their activities.

The GAL's connection to the Inchaurrondo Barracks was linked to Enrique Rodríguez Galindo, who served as commander from 1980 to 1995, when he was promoted to general and assigned as an advisor to the Civil Guard's director general on terrorism matters.

Lasa and Zabala, two ETA members, were detained on October 15, 1983, in Bayonne (France), where they were fugitives, by GAL members and were found in a mass grave in Busot (Alicante) two years later. In April 2000, the National Court sentenced Enrique Rodríguez Galindo to 75 years in prison, Ángel Vaquero, lieutenant colonel at Inchaurrondo, to 69 years, and agents Enrique Dorado and Felipe Bayo, also stationed at the barracks and the material perpetrators of the murder, to 67 years. The ruling confirmed that Lasa and Zabala were held at Inchaurrondo before being transferred to the Palacio de La Cumbre, the official residence of the civil governor Julen Elgorriaga, where they were tortured.

== See also ==
- Kale borroka

== Bibliography ==
- Vera, Rafael (2009). Padre de Caín (in Spanish). Ediciones AKAL. ISBN 9788496797277.
