= 2008 Getxo bombing =

Terrorist incident in Spain

Coordinates: 43.3279°N 3.0158°W

- Part of the Basque conflict
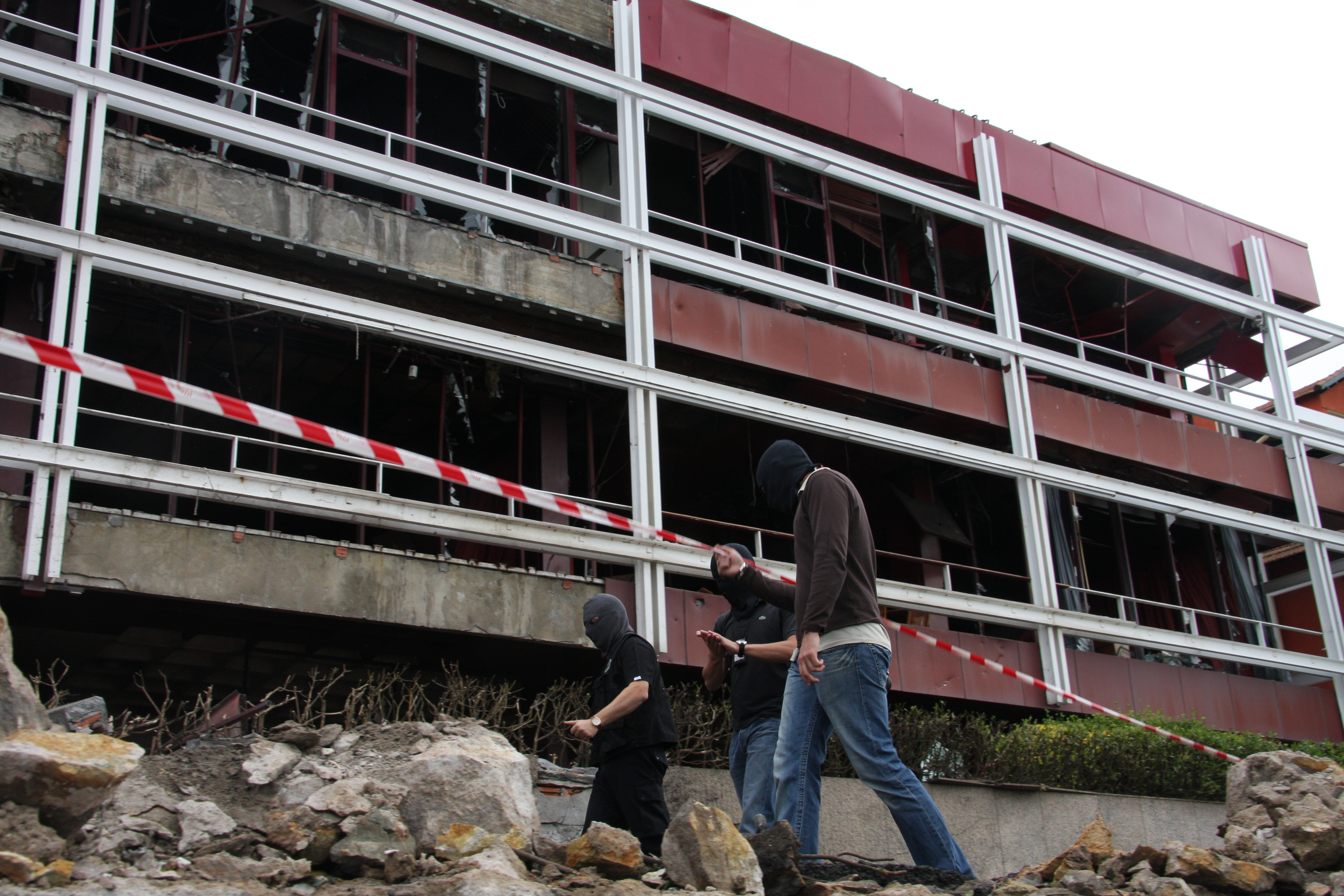
- Ertzaintza officers in front of a damaged building
- Location: Getxo, Biscay, Spain
- Date: 19 May 2008; 00:50 (UTC+1)
- Attack type: van bomb
- Deaths: 0
- Injuries: 0
- Perpetrator: ETA

A van bomb went off on 19 May 2008 outside a boat club in the town of Getxo, Biscay in the Basque Country, Spain. The attack caused serious damage to the club, as well as nearby buildings and structures. No one was killed or injured after a warning call from the Basque separatist organisation ETA. On 31 May, the organisation claimed responsibility for the bombing.

Five days before the attack, another ETA car bomb in a Civil Guard barracks in Legutiano, Álava killed a Civil Guard member and injured four. Both attacks were blamed on the Biscay cell of ETA led by Arkaitz Goikoetxea Basabe, which was most active after the end of the 2006 ceasefire, and was responsible for several attacks in the region during 2007 and 2008. Most of the cell members, as well as the participants in the attack, were arrested in July 2008.

The attack came hours before a meeting by Spanish Prime Minister José Luis Rodríguez Zapatero and Basque lehendakari Juan José Ibarretxe to discuss the Basque Conflict. On the same day of the attack, a memorial service for victims of terrorism was held in San Sebastián.

== Background ==
Getxo, a wealthy seaside suburb near the city of Bilbao, has been the location of several ETA attacks during the Basque conflict, with most of the attacks being carried out in the Las Arenas neighbourhood, home to many businessmen and entrepreneurs. Three civil guards were killed in an ambush in Las Arenas in October 1978. In 2000, a car bomb injured seven on 25 June, and four people were wounded in another car bomb attack on 24 July. On 22 January 2001, Ertzaintza members deactivated a car bomb and judge Jose Maria Lidón Corbi was shot dead on 7 November. On 20 April 2002, a car bomb exploded in front of the house of a businessman, who had been kidnapped in 1996. A bomb exploded inside a hotel on 23 June 2003, while another car bomb went off on 18 January 2005, injuring one. On 11 November 2007, two Booby trap bombs failed to explode in front of a courthouse. The same boat club had already been attacked by bombs on 12 March 1969, and on 30 December 1971. On 26 November 1973, six ETA members set fire to the club.

2008 was ETA's deadliest year since the end of the 2006 ceasefire. In mid 2006, the organisation declared a ceasefire, and conversations between Batasuna, ETA and the Basque and Spanish governments started. Peace talks ended in December, when ETA broke the truce with a massive car bomb at Madrid-Barajas Airport. ETA officially ended the ceasefire in 2007, and resumed its attacks around Spain. At the same time, dozens of members were arrested by Spanish and French police. Despite that, the organisation did not lose the capacity for carrying out attacks.

== Attack ==
The vehicle, a Citroën Berlingo, the same model used in the Legutiano attack, was stolen in Getxo on the same morning of the attack by a cell formed by Arkaitz Goikoetxea Basabe and fellow ETA member Aitor Artetxe Rodríguez. The car was the property of a company owned by a former member of ETA, Xabier Izko de la Iglesia, who had been sentenced in the 1970 Burgos trial. The car was then loaded with 60 kg of ammonal, a type of explosive usually used by ETA. The car also contained shrapnel shell to increase the destructive power. The explosive device had been obtained in the town of Ezcaray, La Rioja and was similar to an abandoned bomb found in Getxo on 31 January 2008.

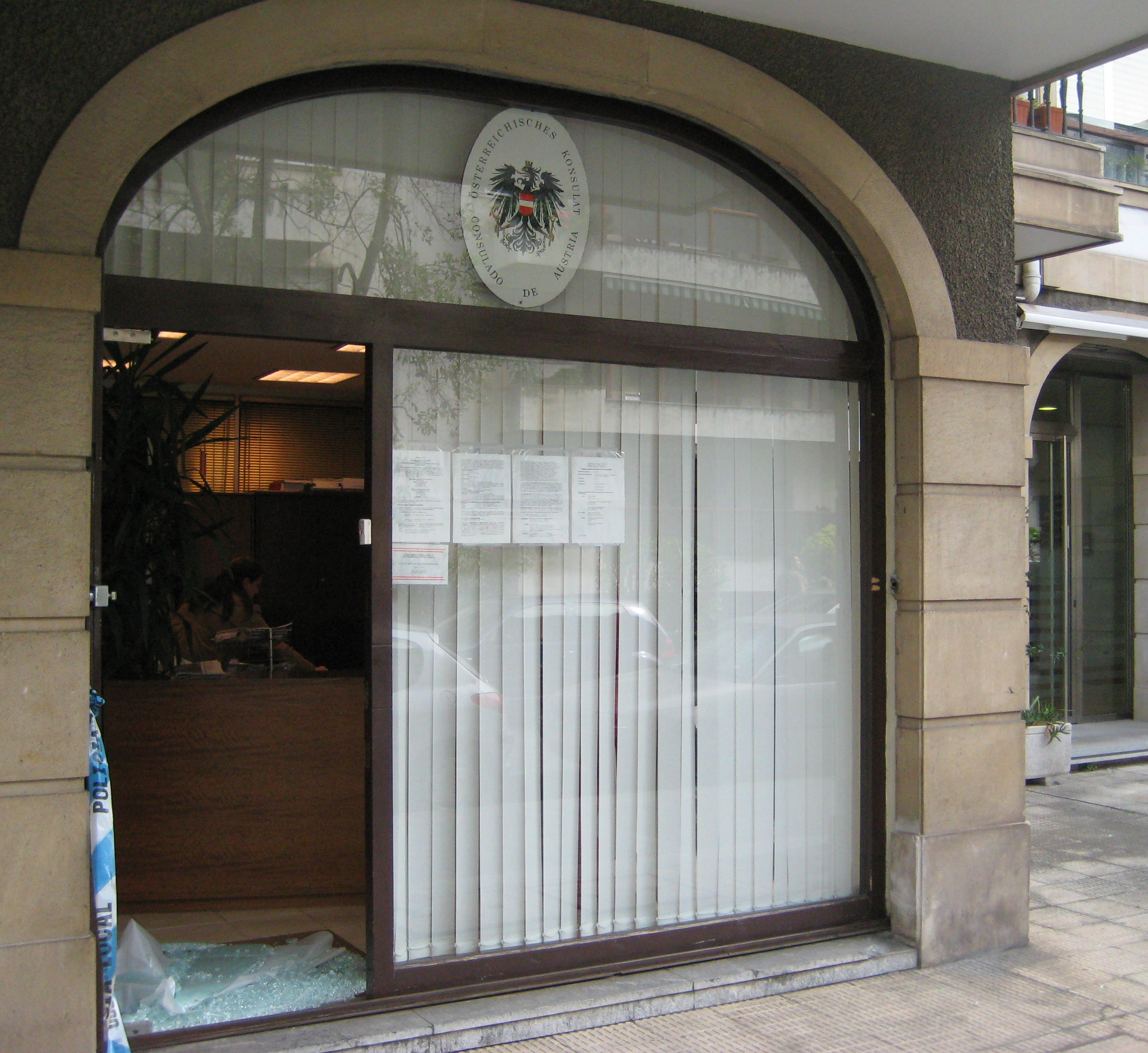
The Austrian Consulate in Getxo was damaged by the explosion

At 23:55, Goikoetxea phoned the DYA headquarters, a Basque roadside assistance association, in Bilbao on behalf of ETA, to alert them that a car bomb would go off in Getxo: "Listen carefully, I'm calling on behalf of ETA. In one hour, a van bomb is going to explode in the seafront walk, next to the boat club of Getxo. Do you understand? Freedom for the Basque Country. Long live ETA". According to reports, the warning call was made from a telephone box located 500 meters from the boat club. A few minutes later, a worker from the club spotted two hooded people, abandoning a vehicle in the middle of the road. Once Ertzaintza officers spotted the vehicle, the area was cordoned off and people evacuated from nearby houses. A family reported to have not been warned of the detonation.

At 00:50, ten minutes before the time the caller had given, the device went off. The detonation tore a hole in the ground and caused considerable damage to the club. Several floors of the building were ripped open and it suffered serious structural damage. Nearby houses and buildings were also affected by the explosion, which was heard in most of the towns around the Estuary of Bilbao. According to the Spanish High Court, 114 people were affected in some way by the attack.

After the attack, Ertzaintza kept the area cordoned off, while looking for other possible bombs. Meanwhile, Goikoetxea headed to Leioa and met Artetxe in a nearby mountain, where they would stay the whole night. By the morning, no other devices had been found and people were able to return to their homes.

== Aftermath ==
Many authorities and politicians condemned the attack. Basque Nationalist Party president Íñigo Urkullu stated that "once again ETA tried to unreasonably become the judge of the Spanish politics" and Partido Popular president Mariano Rajoy gave his support to the government of Spain in its fight against ETA. Most of the political parties also condemned the attack, with Aralar stating that "ETA is an obstacle towards the peace that Euskal Herria (Basque Country) demands".

=== Arrest ===
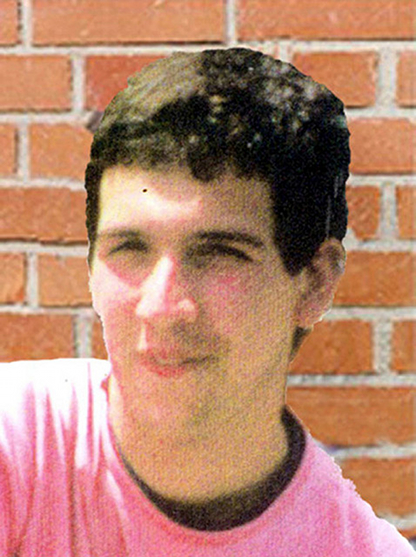
Arkaitz Goikoetxea

On 22 July 2008, the Civil Guard dismantled the Biscay cell, with the arrest of nine members of ETA, including Goikoetxea. Most of the arrests were made in Bilbao, Getxo and Elorrio, while two other people were held in Fuengirola, Málaga and in Nigran, Pontevedra. The operation, which was led by judge Baltasar Garzón, also ended with the arrest of Gaizka Jareño Ugarriza, Adur Aristegi Aragon, Iñigo Gutierrez, Aitor Kotano Sinde, Libe Agirre Mazaga, Maialen Zuazo y Ana Isabel Prieto Fundarena. Senior members of the cell, such as Jurdan Martitegi or Asier Borrero were not arrested. The cell was going to carry out another car bomb attack in Getxo on 31 July and had plans to attack the Bilbao Exhibition Centre, as well as judge Fernando Grande-Marlaska.

Aitor Artetxe was another cell member on the run until he was arrested in the French town of Gerde, Hautes-Pyrénées on 8 December 2008. On the same operation, head of the military commandos Aitzol Iriondo was also arrested, as well as another senior member of ETA, Eneko Zarrabeitia Salterain.

On 19 August 2009, judge Santiago Pedraz prosecuted Goikoetxea and Artetxe for the attack.

== See also ==
- List of ETA attacks
- List of terrorist incidents in 2008
