= Barajas bombing =

Barajas bombing may refer to

- July 1979 Madrid bombings
- 2006 Madrid-Barajas Airport bombing
