= 2006 Madrid–Barajas Airport bombing =

Van bomb by the Basque separatist organisation ETA

Coordinates: 40°29′30″N 3°35′41″W

- Part of the Basque conflict
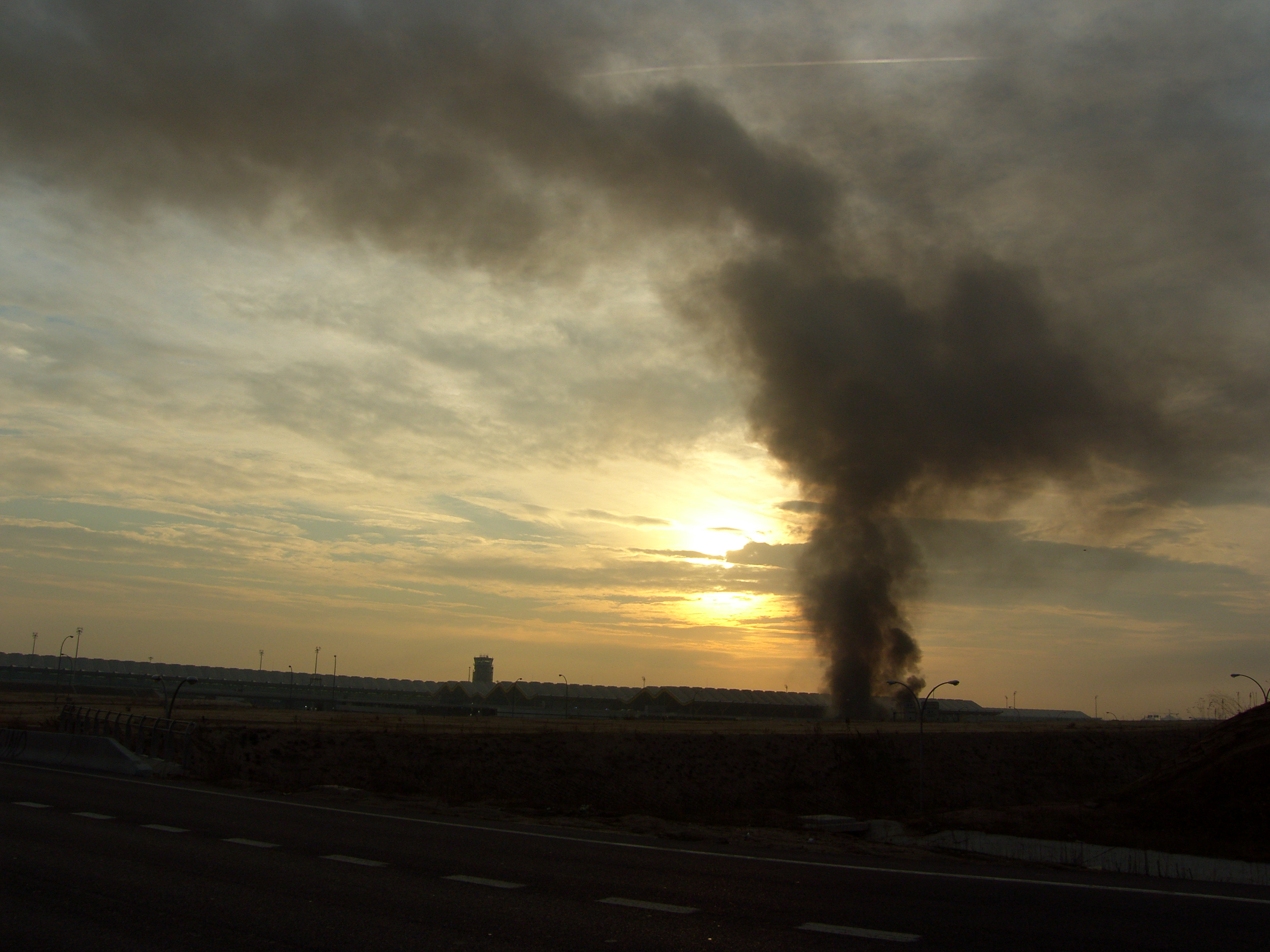
- Smoke billows from the parking building
- Location: Madrid, Spain
- Date: 30 December 2006; 08:59 (UTC+1)
- Target: Madrid–Barajas Airport
- Attack type: van bombing
- Deaths: 2
- Injuries: 52
- Perpetrator: ETA

On 30 December 2006, a van bomb exploded in the Terminal 4 parking area at the Madrid–Barajas Airport in Spain, killing two and injuring 52. On 9 January 2007, the Basque nationalist and separatist organisation ETA claimed responsibility for the attack. The attack, one of the most powerful carried out by ETA, damaged the airport terminal and destroyed the entire parking structure. The bombing ended a nine-month ceasefire declared by the armed organisation and prompted the government to halt plans for negotiations with the organisation. Despite the attack, ETA claimed that the ceasefire was still in place and regretted the death of civilians. The organisation eventually announced the end of the ceasefire in June 2007.

Ordered and planned by then head of commandos Miguel Garikoitz Aspiazu Rubina alias Txeroki, the attack was carried out by the "commando Elurra", whose members were arrested in early 2008 and sentenced for the attack in May 2010. Txeroki was arrested in November 2008 and was condemned to prison in 2011.

== Background ==
On 22 March 2006, ETA announced a ceasefire. Following the announcement, the Spanish government led by José Luis Rodríguez Zapatero on one side and the armed organisation, as well as Batasuna, a Basque nationalist party banned for its ties with ETA, on the other, engaged in talks in order to put an end to the conflict between the two sides. The Basque Nationalist Party, then in charge of the Basque Government, also took part in the conversations. Most of the Basque and Spanish political parties, as well as international institutions, welcomed the announcement, except for the main opposition party People's Party, which called on the government to continue "fighting terrorism" and reject negotiations of any kind.

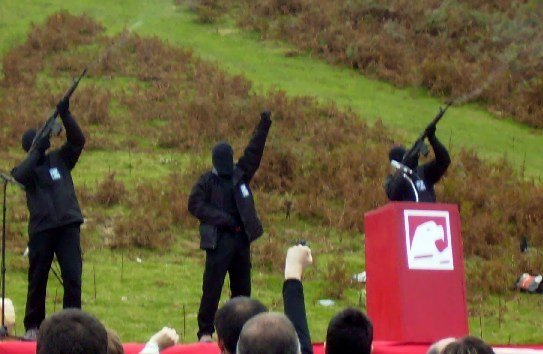
The three ETA members firing salvos during the 2006 Gudari Eguna

During the celebration of the 2006 Gudari Eguna in Aritxulegi, Gipuzkoa on 23 September, three armed ETA members took part in the event and stated that the organisation would "keep on taking up arms until independence and socialism are achieved" in the Basque Country. The armed men also claimed that "the fight is not a thing of the past, it is the present and the future". The statement was regarded by some as intended to put pressure on the talks with the Spanish government, while others saw it as a declaration of ETA's ultimate intentions, making it clear that they would not disarm until every one of their goals had been completely achieved. Despite that, Rodriguez Zapatero stated that the Spanish government would still keep its offer for talks. One of the ETA members was Mattin Sarasola, who took part in the attack.

On 24 October, a commando unit formed by at least five members of ETA stole around 300 revolvers and 50 pistols, as well as ammunition, from an arms warehouse in Vauvert, France, and on 4 November, the Basque newspaper Gara released an ETA private document in which it warned the Spanish government that the "peace process" was "in crisis". After the bombing, the ABC newspaper reported that before the attack, ETA had reminded Rodríguez Zapatero about the 2004 Madrid train bombings as a way to pressure the Government. During the ceasefire, street violence around the Basque Country, known as kale borroka, did not stop.

According to Spanish police, the decision to break the truce may have come from a more violent side of ETA, opposed to any negotiations with the Spanish government, formed by members who joined ETA after participating in the kale borroka and led by Txeroki, who was in charge of all of the organisation's commandos since 2004.

Madrid has been one of the most targeted cities by ETA. Prior to the attack, 36 car bombs had gone off in the city in the previous 20 years and at least 119 people had been killed in attacks carried out by the armed organisation. Some of the most important attacks have been a bomb explosion inside a cafeteria on 13 September 1974, which killed 13 people, a triple bomb attack on 29 July 1979, that killed 7 people, a car bomb explosion on 15 July 1986, which killed 12 Civil Guards, as well as two car bombs that killed seven and six army members in 1993 and 1995, respectively. The Madrid–Barajas airport had also been the location of ETA attacks on 29 July 1979, when three civilians were killed, and on 27 August 2002, when a car bomb exploded on the second floor of the Terminal 2 parking, causing only material damage, after a warning call from the armed organisation.

== Planning ==
In two meetings held at the Baztan valley in Navarre in the summer of 2006, Txeroki, then head of commandos, ordered fellow ETA members Mattin Sarasola, Igor Portu and Mikel San Sebastián to carry out the bombing. The three members had been born in the Navarrese town of Lesaka and were part of the "commando Elurra" (Basque: snow), previously known as "Goiztiarrak", formed in 2002. Until 2006, the commando had the only task of helping members of ETA cross the Spanish-France border and transporting explosives. The cell was also linked with a car bomb attack against a discothèque in the town of Urdax on 14 February 2006, as well as with another attack against a discothèque in Santesteban on 21 December 2005. The leader of the commando group, Joseba Aranibar alias "Basurde" and Joseba Iturbide, who was also part of the cell, did not take part in the meetings. During the first meeting, Txeroki gave instructions on how to carry out the attack and told the members of the commando which secondary roads they should take to arrive to the airport and avoid being caught by security forces. After the meeting, Sarasola took part in 23 September event along with Joseba Iturbide and an unknown member of the organisation. In October, Sarasola, Portu and San Sebastián rehearsed the route to the airport twice. The first rehearsal was made with San Sebastián's personal car and the second one, on 21 October, with a Volkswagen Polo rented in Irun, Gipuzkoa. Leaving from Navarre, the commando members succeeded in parking the Volkswagen Polo in the Terminal 4 car park. After the rehearsals, they met again with Txeroki, who gave them the final instructions for the attack, including the day the attack would take place, as well as how to dress on the day of the bombing. Txeroki asked Sarasola to wear a wig, a cap, as well as a face mask on his nose. Sarasola would also have to carry a suitcase and a crutch, pretending to be lame on one of his legs. He also asked Sarasola to buy a mobile phone with which Portu would warn of the bombing, and told them which places they should phone: the DYA headquarters, a Basque roadside assistance association, in Bilbao, Madrid's firemen and the emergency telephone number 112. Nonetheless, Portu would eventually also call a Basque emergency number.

On 27 December, Portu, Sarasola and San Sebastián stole a Renault Trafic at gunpoint in the French town of Luz Ardiden and held its owner for three days in a cabin located in the Pyrenees. During that time, he was forced to send mobile messages to his mother, stating that he was all right. He was released 40 minutes after the attack. Commando leader Joseba Aranibar loaded the van with explosives, while Sarasola and San Sebastián spent the night at the cabin.

On the morning of 29 December, Aranibar gave the van to Sarasola and San Sebastian. Following the route they had planned, Sarasola drove the van while San Sebastián was driving a motorbike in front of the van. Meanwhile, Portu arrived with another vehicle to a point located 50 kilometres from the airport. Portu met Sarasola and gave him the equipment he needed in order to disguise himself. At 6:51 pm, Sarasola parked the van in the unit D of the Terminal 4 car park and triggered the bomb. He then took a taxi to the town of San Sebastián de los Reyes, where he got rid of the disguise. From there he took another taxi and met Portu, who was driving San Sebastian's motorbike. They then met San Sebastian and they all went back to Lesaka. On the next day, Portu went to the city of San Sebastián, from where he made the warning calls.

== Details of the bombing ==
=== Explosion ===
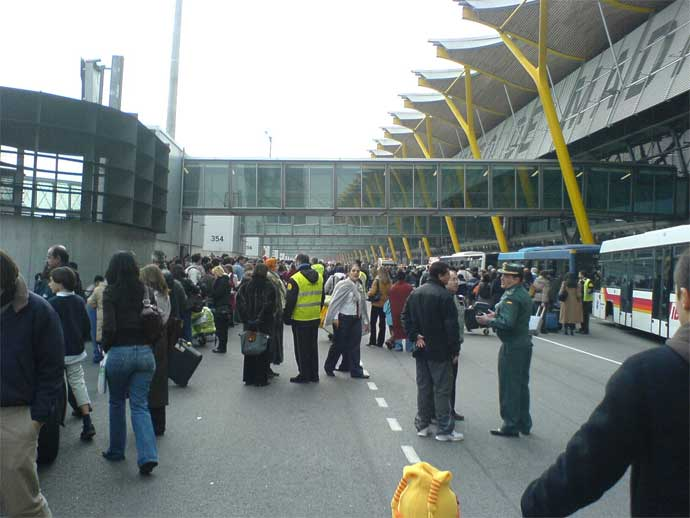
Evacuated passengers gathering outside the terminal after the explosion

At 07:53 am, Igor Portu used a mobile phone to call the DYA headquarters to warn them that a "powerful van bomb" would explode at 09:00. Three minutes later he called the firemen of Madrid, between 07:52 and 07:59 he phoned Gara and finally the SOS/DEIAK emergency number of San Sebastián, this time from a telephone box. Police immediately cordoned off the car park, with hundreds of people being evacuated from the terminal through jetways and gathered outside on the airport ramps.

At 08:59 the Renault Trafic went off, destroying much of section D of the parking lot of the airport's newly built Terminal 4 and sending a massive column of smoke into the air. The terminal, designed by Antonio Lamela and Richard Rogers, had been inaugurated just a few months before, on 5 February 2006. According to reports, the van was carrying 500 to 800 kilograms (1,100 to 1,800 lb) of an unknown kind of explosive, probably a mix of ammonium nitrate and hexogen, becoming the third most powerful explosive device ever used by ETA. The explosion demolished almost all of the five floors of the car park and produced around 40,000 tons of debris, with the zone being compared by Spanish authorities to the World Trade Center ground zero, as well as damaging at least 1300 vehicles parked in the terminal. The terminal building was also affected.

As a result of the explosion, two Ecuadorian citizens, Carlos Alonso Palate and Diego Armando Estacio, who were taking a nap inside their cars and did not manage to evacuate died. It took five days for the rescue teams to reach the buried bodies. 52 other people were injured, with Samur emergency services setting up a field hospital in the terminal in order to assist those injured, mainly from flying glass and damage to their ears due to the shock wave. Hospitals across Madrid received 11 people slightly injured in the blast, with only three of them remaining in the hospitals at the end of the day. The bombing represented ETA's first deadly attack since 2003.

=== Victims ===
Carlos Alonso Palate, 35, was born in the town of Ambato, in the province of Tungurahua, Ecuador. He arrived in Spain in 2002 and lived in Valencia, where he worked in a plastic factory, and was in Madrid to pick up a friend's wife who had come to spend New Year's Eve in Spain. He was buried in the small town of Picaihua on 6 January. The other victim, Diego Armando Estacio, 19, was born in Machala, El Oro. He arrived in Madrid in 2001, where he worked as a construction worker, and was at the airport to pick up some of his girlfriend's relatives. He was buried in his home town on 8 January.

== Aftermath ==
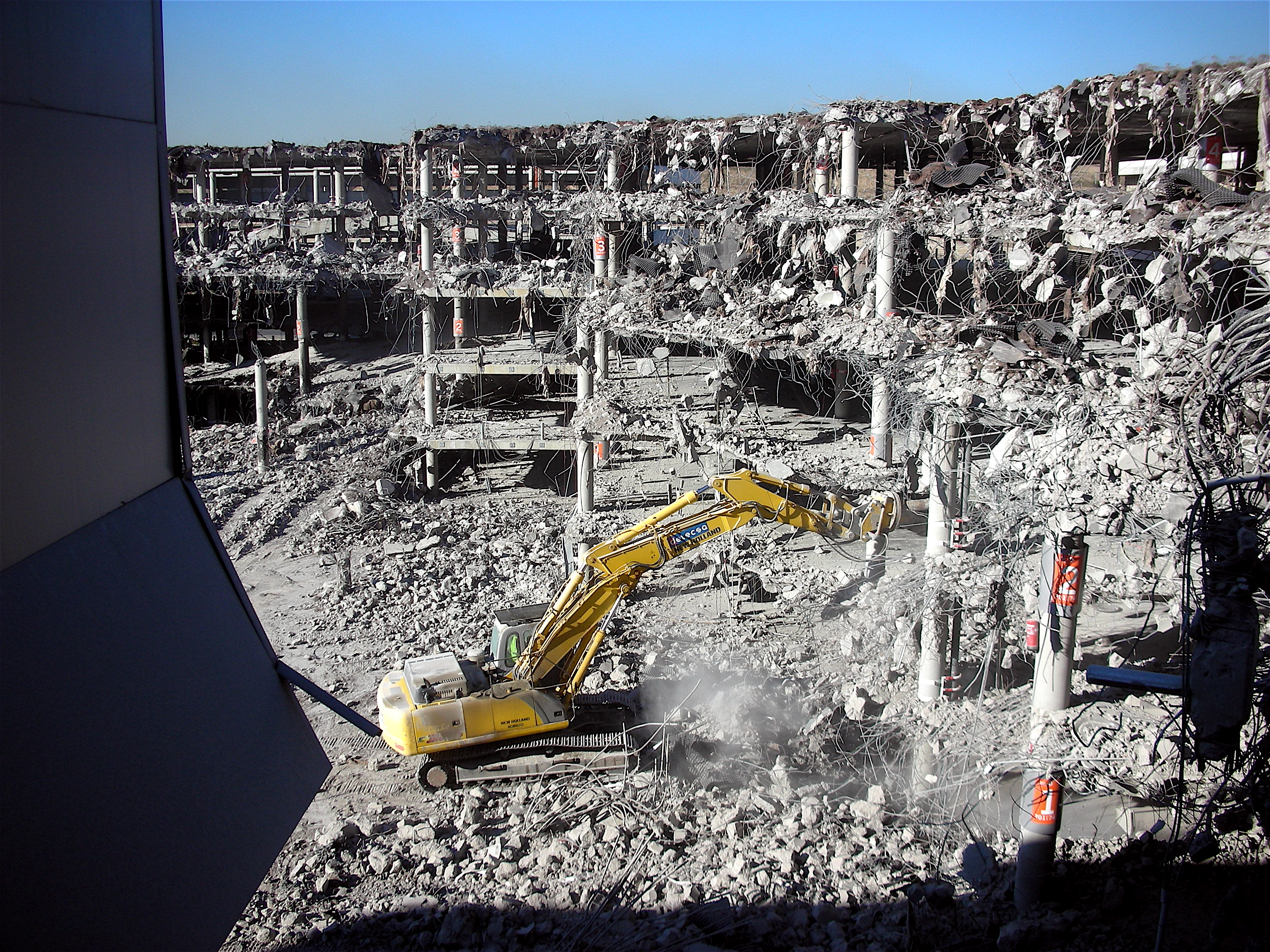
Excavator removing debris from the blast on 24 January

After the blast, Aena immediately closed Terminal 4 and hundreds of flights were interrupted. Flights at the other three terminals were not affected. At 2:00pm, some flights started departing, while Aena asked passengers to only use public transport in order to go to the terminal. After several hours, regular air traffic resumed and by 7:00pm, 388 out of the 575 scheduled had already departed from the terminal.

During the following days, firemen and emergency services kept on removing debris at the scene of the blast and around 25,000 tons of it had been removed by 21 January. The huge amount of debris made it difficult to rescue the bodies of the dead. The body of Carlos Alonso Palate was found inside his car on 4 January, and was repatriated to Ecuador on the following day, when Diego Armando Estacio's body was found, who was sent back home on 7 January. Both bodies departed from the Torrejón Air Base on planes arranged by the Spanish government, who also granted the Spanish nationality to descendants of the dead.

Several authorities visited the bomb site during the days after the blast. On 3 January, Leader of the People's Party Mariano Rajoy visited the bomb site along with President of Madrid Esperanza Aguirre and mayor of Madrid Alberto Ruiz-Gallardón. Rodriguez Zapatero visited the scene on the following day.

=== Reaction ===
Minister of the Interior Alfredo Pérez Rubalcaba condemned the attack and stated that "violence is incompatible with dialogue in any democracy" while Rodríguez Zapatero ordered the government to put all peace talks with ETA "on hold" and condemned the "useless and ridiculous step" that the organization had taken, although he did not announce the end of the peace process. Just a few hours earlier, Rodríguez Zapatero had delivered his end of year message and had claimed that "in one year we will be better than today". Mariano Rajoy asked the government not to negotiate with ETA once again and said he would back the government only if it concentrated on eliminating it. Other Spanish political parties, as well as the Basque government, condemned the attack, although the latter stated that they would like the peace process to continue. Spokesman for Batasuna Arnaldo Otegi refused to condemn the attack and denied that the process was damaged and considered it "just another event" of all the ones that were "blocking" the process, and accused the government of not "making any steps", referring to the situation of ETA prisoner Iñaki de Juana Chaos, who was then on a hunger strike. However, Pérez Rubalcaba announced that the process had definitely been broken.

On the following day of the attack, hundreds of members of the Association of Terrorism Victims staged a protest outside the Spanish Socialist Workers' Party headquarters in Madrid, shouting slogans demanding Rodriguez Zapatero's resignation. Earlier, the association president Francisco José Alcaraz asked the government to expel the Communist Party of the Basque Homelands from all regional institutions in case they did not condemn the attack. He also stated that "civil rebellion will remain unstoppable until the terrorists and all their plans have been destroyed". The association held a bigger demonstration on 14 January in Madrid.

On 9 January 2007, in a statement sent to Gara, ETA claimed responsibility for the attack and insisted that the March ceasefire was still in place despite the bombing. The organisation extended its solidarity to the "collateral damage" caused by the bombing, stating that the "objective of this armed action was not to cause victims" and condemned the fact that the airport had not been totally evacuated. ETA also accused the government of creating obstacles to a democratic process. On 6 January, a demonstration in San Sebastian in favour of ETA prisoners and in support of a democratic solution to the process ended up in riots. ETA eventually announced the end of the ceasefire in another statement on 5 June 2007 and resumed its attacks.

== Memorial ==
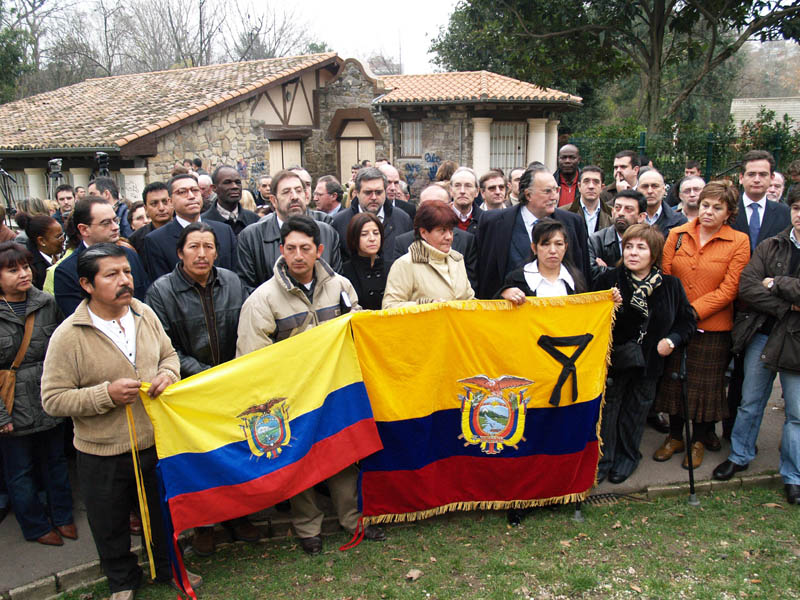
Memorial held in Bilbao

On the evening of the attack, a minute of silence was held across Spanish town halls. On 14 January, several senior Basque politicians including Patxi López gathered in Bilbao, along with the representative of the Ecuadorian people in the Basque Country, in order to pay tribute to the dead, and on 29 January, hundreds of people gathered at the House of America in Madrid. Then-Ecuadorian Minister for Foreign Affairs María Fernanda Espinosa participated in the event, along with then-Spanish secretary for Ibero-America Trinidad Jiménez. On the day the car park was re-inaugurated, authorities unveiled two busts in the exact park places the victims' cars had been parked.

== Reconstruction ==
The van had been placed in the second floor of the car park, and as a result of the blast a 90% of the building was demolished. The reconstruction of the car park started on 21 January, while the damage caused inside the terminal, mainly broken windows as well as distorted structures, had already been repaired by the end of January. Works lasted six months and the car park was inaugurated again by then-Minister of Public Works Magdalena Álvarez on 20 September 2007. Many businessmen attended the event, which also paid tribute to the dead. The reconstruction had a total cost of 24.5 million euros, and 15 million more were used to compensate the damage caused to the 2,100 cars parked there at the time of the attack, as well as to repair the terminal building.

== Arrest and trials ==
All the suspects involved in the attack were arrested during 2008. On 7 January, Igor Portu and Mattin Sarasola were arrested by the Civil Guard on a road close to Arrasate, Gipuzkoa. At the time of the arrest, they both were carrying a revolver. According to reports by other terrorists, they were placed in patrol cars and were beaten by the officers guarding them. While being handcuffed behind their backs, they were taken separately to an undetermined site, where they were punched and kicked, in addition to receiving death threats. A handcuffed Sarasola was thrown down a hillside before having a gun aimed at his head. The Ministry of Interior denied the claims of torture and attributed the injuries to the moment the terrorists resisted arrest and attempted to escape. On the following day, Pérez Rubalcaba announced that Portu and Sarasola were the perpetrators of the airport attack, after they had confessed so while being in custody. On 16 February, Joseba Iturbide and Mikel San Sebastian were arrested in the French town of Saint-Jean-de-Luz, Pyrénées-Atlantiques along with fellow ETA members Jose Antonio Martinez Mur and Asuncion Bengoechea. Finally, Txeroki, Spain's most wanted man at that time, was arrested in Cauterets, Hautes-Pyrénées on 17 November.

On 3 May 2010, Portu, Sarasola and San Sebastián appeared at the Spanish National High Court in Madrid for their role in the attack. All of them refused to address the court, with Sarasola stating that he did not recognise that "fascist court" and said he was "not going to take part in it". On 21 May, they were found guilty of two murders and 48 murder attempts (the final sentence stated that there were 48 wounded people), and each of them was sentenced to 1,040 years of prison, although the maximum a person can serve for a terrorism conviction under the Spanish law is 40 years.

=== Torture trial ===
On 25 October 2010, 15 Civil Guards went on trial in San Sebastián in relation to the torture suffered by Portu and Sarasola. On 30 December, four of them were sentenced to prison: two for four years, and the other two for two years. The rest of the officers were found not guilty and were acquitted. It was the first time since 2001 that Civil Guards had been sentenced with claims of torture against members of ETA.

== See also ==
- 1996 Docklands bombing, a similar attack by the Provisional IRA
- ETA's 2006 ceasefire declaration
- List of terrorist incidents, 2006
- List of ETA attacks
- Reus Airport bombing
