= El padre de Caín =

Spanish television series

- Genre: Drama
- Based on: El padre de Caín by Rafael Vera
- Screenplay by: Alejandro Hernández; Michel Gaztambide
- Directed by: Salvador Calvo
- Starring: Quim Gutiérrez; Aura Garrido; Oona Chaplin
- Composer: Víctor Reyes
- Country of origin: Spain
- Original language: Spanish
- No. of seasons: 1
- No. of episodes: 2

Production
- Production companies: Telecinco; Boomerang TV

Original release
- Network: Telecinco
- Release: 6 December – 7 December 2016

El padre de Caín is a two-part Spanish television miniseries directed by Salvador Calvo adapting the novel of the same name by Rafael Vera. It stars Quim Gutiérrez, Aura Garrido and Oona Chaplin.

== Premise ==
Set in the 1980s, the plot follows the story of a Civil Guard agent who requests a transfer to the barracks of Intxaurrondo (in the Basque Country), when ETA was most active.

== Cast ==
- Quim Gutiérrez as Eloy.
- Aura Garrido as Begoña.
- Oona Chaplin as Mercedes.
- Patxi Freytez as sargento Delgado.
- Luis Bermejo as comandante de Intxaurrondo.
- Luis Zahera as Bermejo.
- Eduardo Lloveras as Carmelo.
- Cristina Plazas as madre de Mercedes.
- Ricardo Gómez as Daniel.
- Patrick Criado as Ander.

== Production and release ==
Based on the novel of the same name by Rafael Vera, the series was written by Alejandro Hernández and Michel Gaztambide and directed by Salvador Calvo. Produced by Telecinco in collaboration with Boomerang TV, it was filmed in Asturias (including Avilés), the Madrid region and San Sebastián. Filming wrapped by August 2015 after 5 weeks of production. The score was composed by Víctor Reyes. The series premiered on 6 December 2016. The first part earned good viewership figures (3,223,000 average viewers and a 19% audience share). The finale aired a day later, on 7 December, commanding significantly less attention from the audience (2,518,000 viewers and a 14.5% share).

Series	Episodes	Originally released			Viewers	Share (%)	Ref.
Series	Episodes	First released	Last released	Network	Viewers	Share (%)	Ref.
1	2	6 December 2016	7 December 2016	Telecinco	2,842,000	16.6	

No.	Title	Directed by	Original release date
1	"La tortuga y el águila"	Salvador Calvo	6 December 2016
2	"Síndrome del norte"	Salvador Calvo	7 December 2016
