= Francisco Javier López =

Francisco Javier López may refer to:

== Politicians ==
- Javier López (general) (1792–1836), Argentine soldier and several times governor of Tucumán Province
- Javier López Marcano (1955–2026), Spanish politician from Cantabria
- Francisco Javier López Álvarez (born 1959), Spanish socialist politician

== Sportspeople ==
- Francisco Javier López Alfaro (born 1962), retired Spanish footballer
- Francisco Javier López García (born 1950), retired Spanish footballer
- Francisco Javier López Castro (born 1964), retired Spanish footballer
- Francisco Javier López (hurdler, born 1973), Spanish hurdler
- Francisco Javier López Díaz (born 1988), Spanish footballer
- Francisco Javier López (hurdler, born 1989) (born 1989), Spanish hurdler

== Others ==
- Francisco Javier López Peña (1958–2013), ETA member
