= Reus Airport =

Reus Airport Aeropuerto de Reus Aeroport de Reus

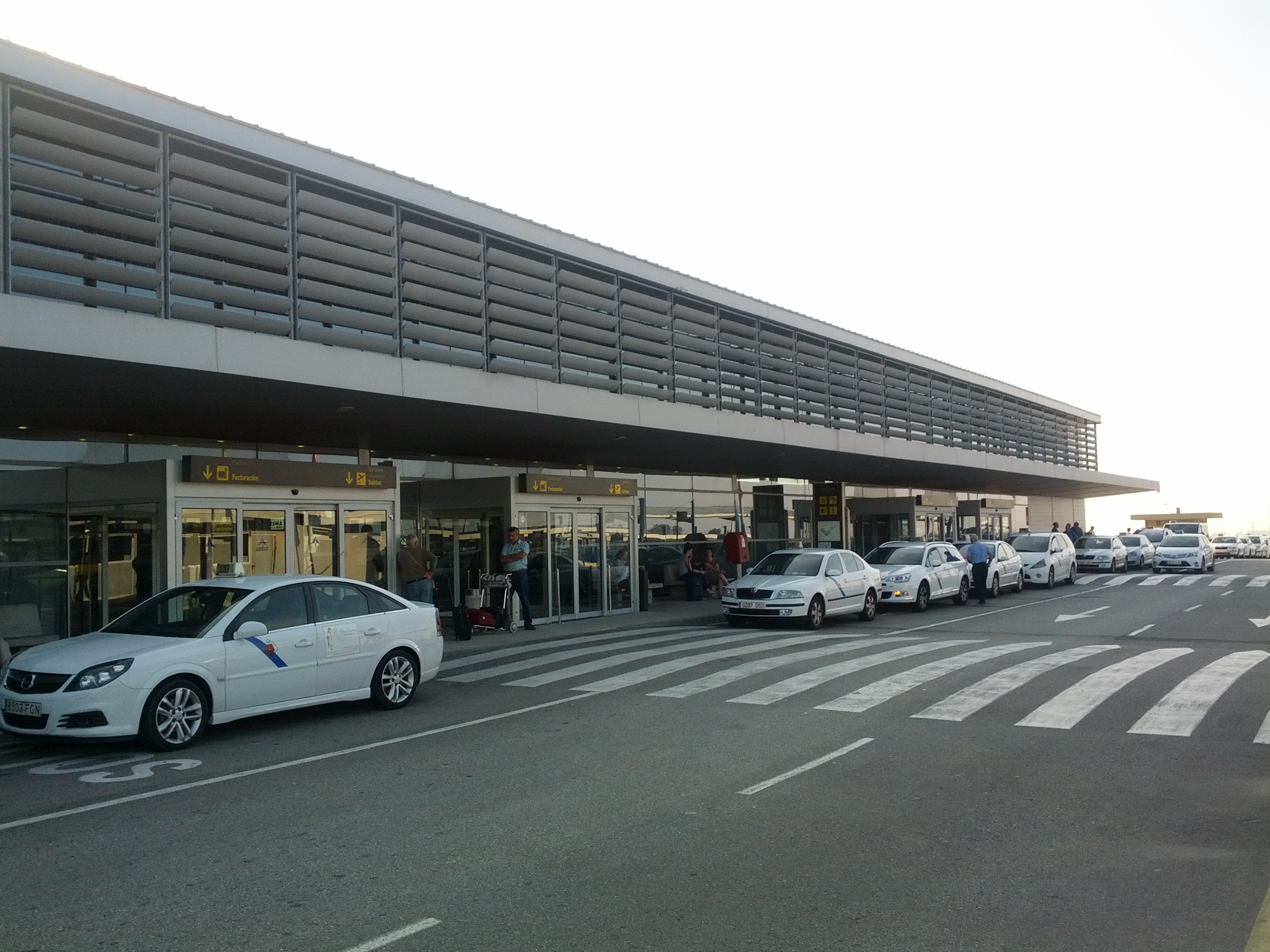
- IATA: REU; ICAO: LERS

Summary
- Airport type: Public
- Owner/Operator: AENA
- Serves: Reus, Barcelona, Tarragona, Costa Dorada
- Elevation AMSL: 71 m (233 ft)
- Coordinates: 41°08′51″N 001°10′02″E
- Website: www.aena.es

Map
- Location within Spain

Runways
Direction	Length		Surface
Direction	m	ft	Surface
07/25	2,459	8,068	Asphalt

Statistics (2025)
- Passengers: 1,336,826
- Passenger change 2024–25: ▲13.1%
- Aircraft movements: 23,251
- Source: AENA

Reus Airport (IATA: REU, ICAO: LERS) (also known as Barcelona-Reus) is located near the beaches of the Costa Daurada, equidistant in relation to the town of Constantí and the city of Reus and approximately 8 km (5.0 mi) from the city centre of Tarragona, in Catalonia, Spain.

The airport receives a large amount of tourist traffic from passengers destined for the beach resorts of Salou and Cambrils as well as for the centre of Barcelona, which is approximately 103 km (64 mi) to the northeast. It is also close to one of Europe's largest theme resorts, PortAventura World, and the Mountains of Prades, a Mediterranean forest in the comarca of Baix Camp.

== History ==
=== Early years ===
The airport was founded in 1935 by the Aeroclub de Reus. It served as a Republican base during the Spanish Civil War and after the Nationalist victory served as a Spanish Air Force base. The base was demilitarised in the late 1990s and became a fully civilian airport administered by AENA, the Spanish airports authority.

=== Development since the 2000s ===
The airport has been a Ryanair base since October 2008 although for the winter 2009–2010 season Ryanair reduced the number of flights and destinations from Reus by a substantial amount. This reduction was only temporary for the winter months, and a full flight programme recommenced late March 2010.

On 29 June 2011 Ryanair announced that their base would close on 30 October with the loss of 28 routes after failing to reach an agreement with the local government. Ryanair resumed some flights in March 2012, but they are operated by aircraft not based at Reus.

== Terminal ==
In order to adapt Reus Airport to future air traffic demand, Aena Aeropuertos has carried out a series of improvements and extended its facilities. These include a new check-in building between the arrivals and departures buildings, integrating the three buildings into one. The departures building has also been remodelled for use as a boarding area. The departures terminal had 23 check-in desks and 12 boarding gates spread over two rooms but in 2023, 3 gates were removed due to the small size of the terminal and inefficiency of showing passports at the gates. There are currently 9 gates: gates 1 to 3 are intended for Schengen flights, and 4 to 9 are dedicated to non-Schengen destinations - although occasionally the two rooms are made into one with Schengen flights departing from other gates. Before entering the departure lounge for gates 4 to 9, passengers have to go through passport control unlike gates 1 to 3. The public area and the passenger only zone have cafeteria and restaurant services and duty-free shops for both gates 1 to 3 and 4 to 9. For the lounge with gates 4 to 9 the duty free shop has been significantly upgraded in 2024, it now has two entrances.

== Airlines and destinations ==
The following airlines operate regular scheduled and charter flights to and from Reus:

Airlines	Destinations
Air Nostrum	Seasonal charter: Porto
easyJet	Seasonal: Belfast–International, Bristol , Glasgow, London–Gatwick, London–Luton, Manchester, Newcastle upon Tyne
Iberia	Seasonal: Palma de Mallorca
Jet2.com	Seasonal: Belfast–International, Birmingham, Bournemouth (begins 2 May 2027), Bristol, East Midlands, Edinburgh, Glasgow, Leeds/Bradford, Liverpool, London–Gatwick, London–Luton, London–Stansted, Manchester, Newcastle upon Tyne
Ryanair	Seasonal: Birmingham, Brussels Charleroi, Cork, Dublin, East Midlands, Eindhoven, Leeds/Bradford, Liverpool, London–Stansted, Manchester, Shannon, Weeze
TUI Airways	Seasonal: Aberdeen, Belfast–International, Birmingham, Bristol, Cardiff, Glasgow, London–Gatwick, Manchester, Newcastle upon Tyne
TUI fly Belgium	Seasonal: Brussels
Vueling	Seasonal: Paris–Orly

== Statistics ==
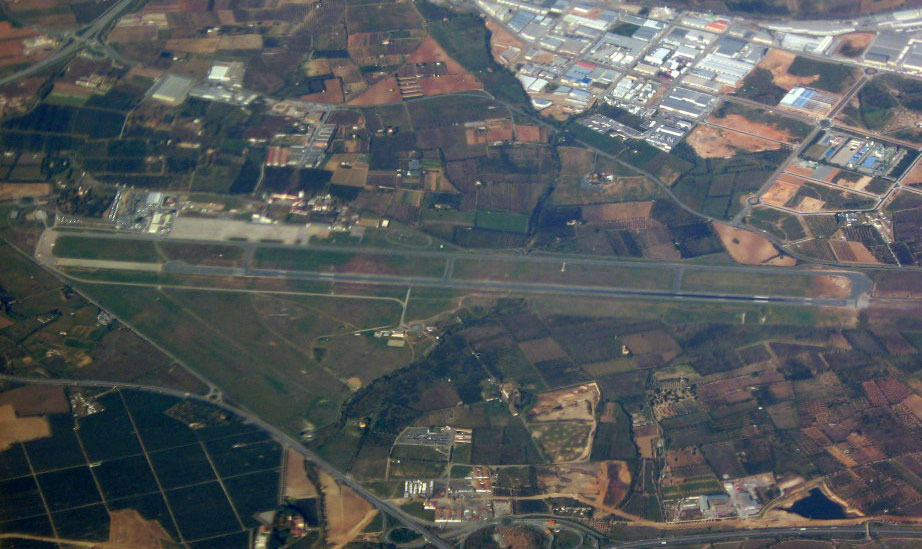
Aerial view

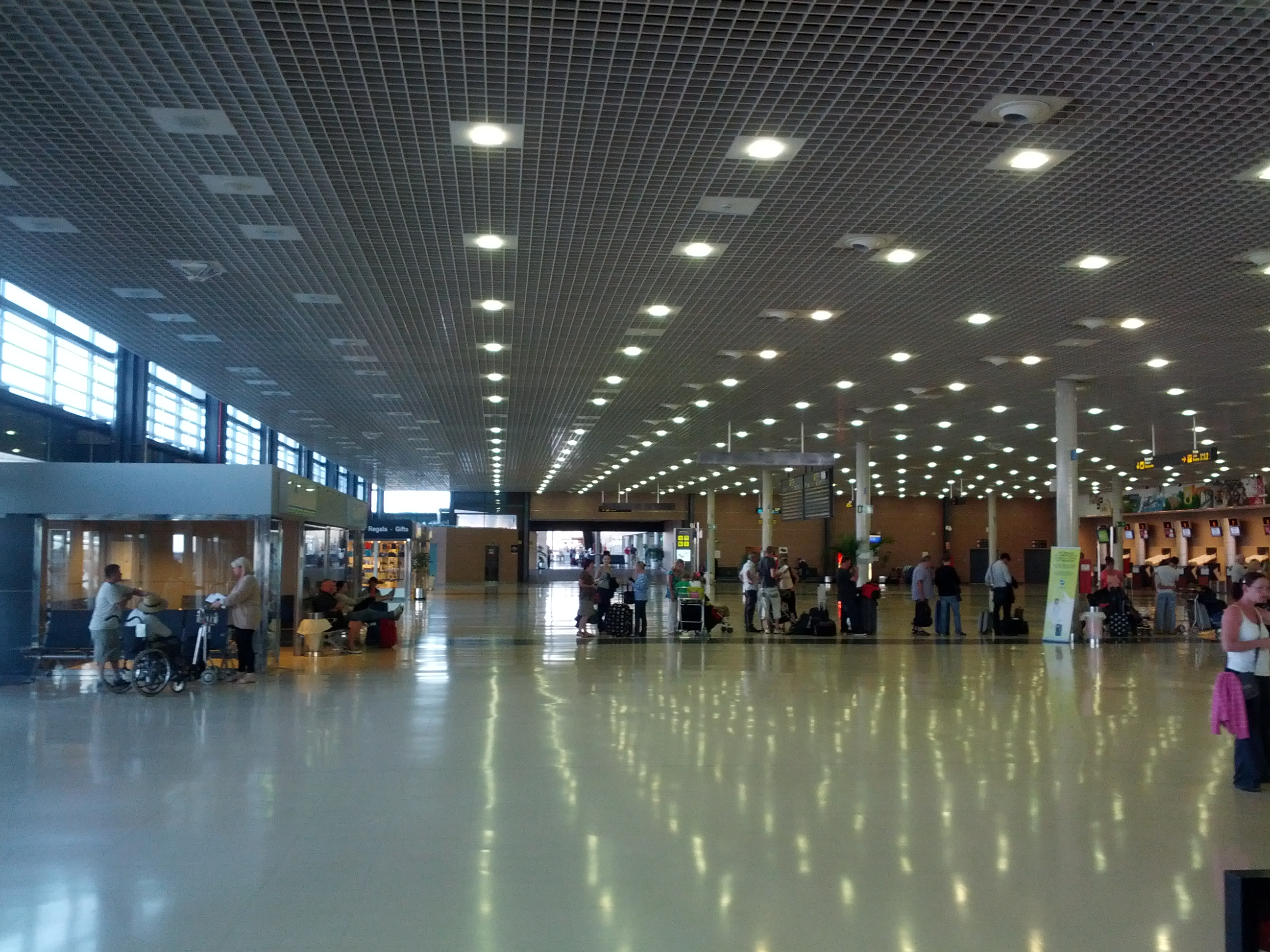
Terminal interior

=== Development ===
In 1995, approximately 500,000 passengers passed through the airport. In 2004 this number more than doubled to 1.1 million and in 2009 the airport reached a peak of 1.7 million. By 2014 this had dropped (-12.4%) to 850,492 passengers. In 2015 the drop continued to 705,067 passengers (-17,1%). After that the number of passengers has increased a lot to 817,765 passengers in 2016 (+16,0%). In 2017 the airport passed after 6 years again the mark of 1 million passengers. In 2020, due to the Covid-19 pandemic, passenger numbers dropped significantly but started to recover in 2022 although 1m passengers was not hit. In 2023 over 1m passengers passed through the terminal once again and is most likely going to increase for 2024 and 2025. This is due to more airlines and routes taking place, for example, easyJet have relaunched flights from Manchester airport and London’s Luton airport for the 2024 summer season and for the 2025 summer season, London’s Southend airport.

=== Busiest routes ===
Busiest routes from REU (2023)
Rank	Destination	Passengers	Change 2021/22
1	Dublin	175,577	▲11%
2	Manchester	109,372	▲9%
3	London-Stansted	94,686	▲59%
4	Birmingham	67,875	▲9%
5	Cork	61,129	▲28%
6	Eindhoven	50,712	▼7%
7	Glasgow	50,555	▲5%
8	Shannon	44,227	▲60%
9	Newcastle	43,308	▼1%
10	Charleroi	42,579	▲40%
11	Belfast-International	40,537	0%
12	East Midlands	39,877	▲17%
13	Leeds/Bradford	38,853	▼20%
14	Bristol	33,890	▲19%
15	Liverpool	30,791	▲63%
16	London-Gatwick	24,367	▲10%
17	Weeze	21,204	New route
18	Paris-Orly	19,684	New route
19	Edinburgh	14,553	▼19%
20	Brussels	10,738	▼1%
Source: Estadísticas de tráfico aereo

== Incidents and accidents ==
- On 20 July 1970, a Condor Boeing 737-100 (registered D-ABEL) which was approaching Reus Airport, collided with a privately owned Piper Cherokee light aircraft (registration EC-BRU) near Tarragona, Spain. The Piper subsequently crashed, resulting in the death of the three persons on board. The Condor Boeing suffered only minor damage, and there were no injuries amongst the 95 passengers and 5 crew members.
- In 1996, two powerful bombs placed by the Basque group Euskadi ta Askatasuna (ETA) in the airport left more than 30 people injured. That same day two other bombs exploded in two hotels located near the airport.
- In 2004 a Swearingen Metro aircraft was to be repositioned to Barcelona Airport for maintenance work, but during takeoff, while accelerating 80 knots, the nose gear collapsed. The aircraft sustained serious damage to the fuselage, engines and the propellers.
