= Reus Airport bombing =

Terrorist attack in Catalonia, Spain on 21 July, 1996

Coordinates: 41.1464°N 1.1533°E

- Location: Tarragona, Catalonia, Spain
- Date: 21 July 1996 (UTC)
- Deaths: 0
- Injuries: 35
- Perpetrator: ETA

On 21 July 1996, the Basque nationalist group Euskadi Ta Askatasuna (ETA) detonated two bombs at Reus Airport near Tarragona in Spain. Thirty-five people were injured, most of whom were British tourists.

== Attack ==
The bomb was planted in a rubbish bin in the passenger terminal of Reus Airport. The ETA gave telephone warnings just five minutes before detonation, meaning police did not have enough time to evacuate the terminal. Most of the wounded were British holidaymakers waiting for their flights home. Despite the high casualty rate, the bombs caused only minor structural damage to the airport. A Spanish cleaner, Isabel Montiel Lorenzo, was the most injured as she was right next to the bin.

Bombs were also planted at two hotels nearby, in Cambrils and Salou. These were also busy with British tourists. The hotels were evacuated and the bombs safely defused in controlled explosions.

The attack came amid a stepped-up campaign against tourist targets from the ETA in its insurgency against the Spanish government.

== Aftermath ==
The attack raised fears for the safety of Spain's tourist economy. The Spanish state tightened security as a result of the bombing. Extra security personnel were added to airports and additional police patrols to the country's popular touristic beaches.

== See also ==
- 2006 Madrid–Barajas Airport bombing
