= Urrúnaga =

Village in Álava, Spain

Urrunaga
- Concejo
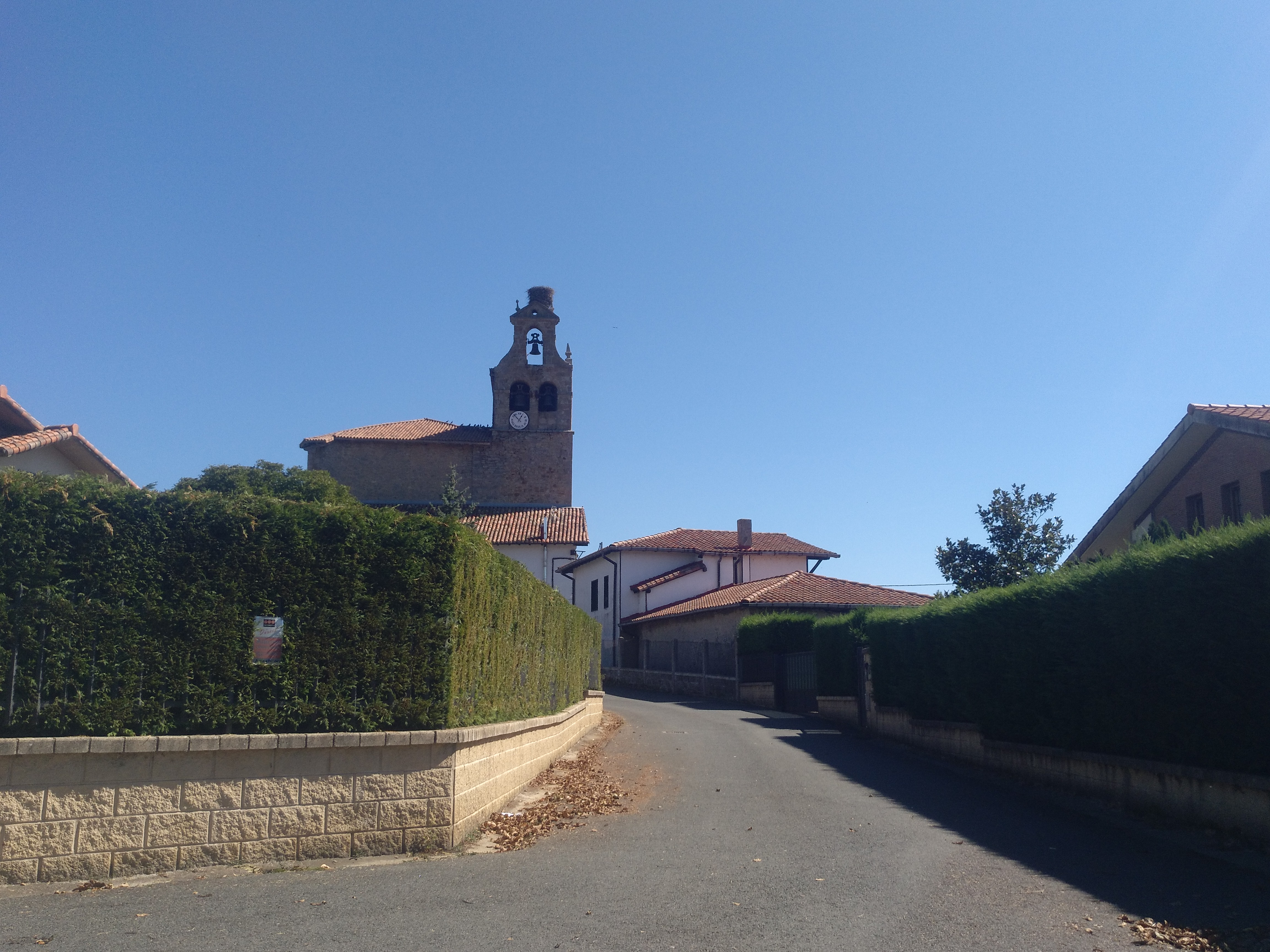

- Location within Álava Location within the Basque Country Location within Spain
- Coordinates: 42°57′16″N 2°39′10″W
- Country: Spain
- Autonomous community: Basque Country
- Province: Álava
- Comarca: Gorbeialdea
- Municipality: Legutio

Area
  - Total: 6.13 km^{2} (2.37 sq mi)
- Elevation: 529 m (1,736 ft)

Population (2023)
  - Total: 114
  - Density: 18.6/km^{2} (48.2/sq mi)
- Postal code: 01170

Urrunaga (Spanish: Urrúnaga) is a village and concejo in the municipality of Zigoitia, Álava province, Basque Country, Spain. The hamlet of Nafarrate is also part of the concejo. The dam of the eponymous Urrunaga Reservoir is located close to the village.
