= Iñaki de Juana Chaos =

Spanish terrorist

- Born: José Ignacio de Juana Chaos; 1955 (age 70–71); Gipuzkoa, Spain
- Organization: ETA
- Movement: Basque separatist
- Parent(s): Daniel de Juana Rubio and Esperanza Chaos Lloret
- Relatives: Altamira
- Status: Released
- Criminal charges: Killing 25 people
- Penalty: 3000 years imprisonment

Details
- Killed: 25
- Imprisoned at: 1987

José Ignacio de Juana Chaos (born 1955 in Gipuzkoa, Spain), better known as Iñaki de Juana Chaos, is a member of the Basque separatist group ETA. He was convicted of killing 25 people in 1987 and was originally sentenced to 3,000 years in prison. As a result of complicated sentencing guidelines, he became eligible for release in late 2004 after only serving 17 years. However, the Spanish Government prevented his release by accusing him of making terrorist threats in two articles written from prison. In August 2006, he started a hunger strike protesting his continued imprisonment but it ended after sixty-three days. Another hunger strike occurred from November 2006 until March 2007, it ended after he was moved from a hospital in Madrid to one in his home region of Gipuzkoa. After he left the hospital he was to be placed under house arrest, but on 6 June 2007, after the end of ETA's ceasefire he was sent to Aranjuez prison. On 2 August 2008, de Juana Chaos was released from prison.

== Background ==
De Juana was born in Legazpia, Guipuzcoa. His father, Daniel de Juana Rubio, was born in the city of Miranda de Ebro in the province of Burgos around 1908. He was a doctor who had also been a decorated military lieutenant on the Francoist side during the Spanish Civil War. His mother, Esperanza Chaos Lloret, was born around 1924 in Tetuán, Spanish Morocco, where her father, a soldier in the Spanish Army, was stationed.

De Juana and his brother, Altamira, grew up in mansion in Legazpi. There his father who was a doctor worked at a major steel factory where he treated the workers. The family lived next to a Civil Guard barracks and de Juana would play football with the children of the guards.

De Juana joined the military service and was awarded a diploma from the city of Madrid in recognition of the courage he showed in a fighting a major fire in the city in 1977. After military service, he joined the Ertzaintza. He was promoted twice, but in 1983, he left the service. He then went across the border to France where he was involved in the clandestine ETA paramilitary group there.

== Activity in ETA ==
In the mid-1980s, de Juana was the leader of the "Madrid Commando", a team attacking targets in the Madrid area

- 12 June 1985 - machine gun vehicle killing Colonel Vicente Romero and his driver, Juan García Jiménez. After the shooting the group hid a booby trap bomb in their getaway car, which killed policeman Esteban del Amo.
- 29 July 1985 - military vehicle machine gunned, killing Vice-Admiral Fausto Escrigas Estrada.
- 9 September 1985 - a car bomb exploded in plaza de la República Argentina against a Guardia Civil van. No agents were dead, but Eugene Kenneth Brown, an American jogging by, was killed.
- 25 April 1986 - car bomb in Madrid killed five policemen (Juan Carlos González, Vicente Javier Domínguez, Juan José Catón Vázquez, Juan Mateos Pulido y Alberto Alonso Gómez)
- 17 June 1986 - the car of Commander Ricardo Sáenz de Ynestrillas was machine-gunned resulting in the death of the commander, a lieutenant colonel (Carlos Vesteiro Pérez) and a soldier (Francisco Casillas Martín).
- 14 July 1986 - Plaza República Dominicana bombing: a car bomb that killed 12 policemen (Jesús María Freixes, Santiago Iglesias Rodino, Carmelo B. Álamo, Miguel A. Cornejo Ros, José Calvo Gutiérrez, Andrés José Fernández Pertierra, Antonio Lancharro Reyes, José Joaquín García Ruiz, Jesús Gimeno Gimeno, Juan Ignacio Calvo Guerrero, Javier Esteban y Ángel de la Higuera López)

== Prison sentence ==
De Juana was arrested in 1987 and convicted of killing 25 people. He was sentenced to 3000 years, but under the law that was in place during de Juana's trial, the maximum sentence he could serve was 30 years. The Spanish justice system has a policy called remission, which states that time can be deducted from a prisoner's sentence for exhibiting good behavior and for other factors. As de Juana could only legally serve thirty years in prison, with his earned remission being subtracted from the sentence, he should have been released in October 2004. To stop de Juana from being released, the Prosecutor's Office charged him with making terrorist threats, using letters sent to the newspapers (Gara and Berria).

=== Hunger strike ===
On 7 August 2006, de Juana began a hunger strike to demand his release on October 4, 2006, the date which he should have been released under his original sentence. He began to be force-fed on 20 September. He ended the hunger strike after 63 days on 9 October.

In November 2006, de Juana was sentenced to twelve years and seven months for allegedly making terrorist threats in two articles of opinion and he resumed his hunger strike. In February 2007, de Juana's sentence for promoting terrorism was cut from more than 12 years, down to 3 years. On 24 February, thousands of people protested in Madrid against the ruling. According to two polls, the majority of Spaniards opposed this decision.

On 2 March 2007, the Spanish Government made the decision to essentially demote de Juana to house arrest due to worries over his health. This decision was criticized by the major conservative party, Partido Popular, who denounced the move as an agreement between government and ETA, and an encouragement for future prisoner hunger strikes.

On 1 March 2007, de Juana ended his hunger strike after 114 days, after being moved from Madrid to a hospital in the Basque Region. He was to serve the remainder of his sentence on house arrest. On 10 March 2007, thousands of people protested in Madrid against the release of de Juana. On 6 June 2007, de Juana was sent back to prison one day after ETA said the ceasefire was to end.

On 17 July 2008, de Juana commenced his third hunger strike. This time he was protesting a decision by the Prosecutor's Office of the National Court to place a lien on an apartment which his wife owns. This will not stop him from living there, but it will stop the apartment from being sold. de Juana owes his victims €8 million.

=== Release ===
On August 2, 2008, de Juana Chaos was released from prison after serving 21 years. Prime Minister José Luis Rodríguez Zapatero said De Juana Chaos "generates a perfectly understandable feeling of contempt" among all citizens "and of course the head of the government". He added, "But we must respect the law."

=== Ireland ===
In September 2008, de Juana applied for a passport using an address in Dublin, Ireland. The address belonged to Jim Monaghan who was part of a group known as the Colombia Three, captured in Colombia and accused of training members of Farc before fleeing and being sentenced to 17 years in absentia.

A warrant was issued by Interpol as a Spanish judge wanted de Juana to answer charges that he was "glorifying terrorism." The Irish Government pledged its support to find de Juana. On 14 November, the PSNI said they were looking for de Juana. de Juana's Belfast lawyer said he would appear before a Belfast court on 17 November. When he came to court his lawyer said that he would fight extradition and that the maximum sentence on the charge was less than the minimum of three years necessary for extradition. His lawyer also challenged the basis of the charge which the Spanish state said was contained in a letter allegedly written by de Juana and allegedly quoted by a supporter at a function to welcome de Juana home. The British judge said needed to know specifically what laws had allegedly been broken by de Juana and whether similar charges existed under British law. De Juan was then released on bail, with a new trial date set for December. The Spanish state representative then consulted with the group Victimas del Terrorismo. Outside of the court there were protesters, some pro-Basque independence and others anti-ETA.
