= Miguel Garikoitz Aspiazu Rubina =

ETA activist (born 1973)

- Born: 6 July 1973 (age 53); Bilbao, Spain
- Status: Arraigned
- Other name: Txeroki
- Known for: Leader of Commando unit
- Term: 2003 – 2008

Miguel Garikoitz Aspiazu Rubina alias Txeroki ("Cherokee") (born 6 July 1973) is a member of the ETA. He headed the military/commando unit of the group until his arrest in France on 16 November 2008.

In March 2013, a Paris court sentenced him to 20 years in prison for kidnapping a Spanish family in 2007.

== ETA activity ==
Although he gained prominence in the military section of ETA, he rose to the highest level of ETA's leadership following the May 2008 arrest of Francisco Javier López Peña, also in France. As the military chief, he was believed to have orchestrated, ordered and planned ETA bomb attacks.

He was rumoured to have been the person responsible for breaking a truce with the Spanish government when he authorized the Barajas bombing on 30 December 2006. Spanish authorities have also suspected Rubina personally killed two Guardia Civil police officers as they were doing undercover intelligence work in December 2007. Before his arrest, he was wanted on a total of 22 criminal charges in Spain, including the murder of Judge Jose Maria Lidon in November 2001.

== Imprisoned ==
The French Interior Minister Michele Alliot-Marie announced that he had been arrested overnight on 16 November 2008, at 3:30, in Cauterets following a joint investigation by French and Spanish police. He was arrested along with Leire López Zurutuza, a woman suspected of being an ETA member, by the French anti-terrorism police.

His arrest was the result of police investigative work following the arrest of two other ETA suspects who said he told them that he had killed the two officers in Capbreton on 1 December 2007.

He appeared before a Paris judge where he was formally charged in connection with the killing of the two undercover Spanish police officers.

Following his arrest, he was also indicted in a Spanish court for his alleged role in the Barajas bombing.

=== Political impact ===
Sections of the media asked whether his arrest could debilitate ETA's violent activity. Alternatively, the arrest could have also led to an increase in ETA activity. Some saw it merely as the biggest blow to ETA in the last half-year since Lopez Peña's arrest. Some comments saw the arrest as marking "a further blow for hardline members of ETA."

== International reactions ==
The Spanish prime minister José Luis Rodríguez Zapatero said that his arrest would cause "great damage" to ETA but also warned that ETA was still "capable of carrying out attacks." Spain was put on a full security alert to guard against retaliation for Rubina's arrest.

== See also ==
- Arkaitz Goikoetxea
