= ETA's 2006 ceasefire declaration =

ETA's 2006 "permanent ceasefire" was the period spanning between 24 March and 30 December 2006 during which, following an ETA communiqué, the Spanish government, led by José Luis Rodríguez Zapatero on one side, and the militant group on the other, engaged in talks as a means to agree on a formula to voluntarily disband the latter. It was terminated as a result of the 2006 Madrid Barajas International Airport bombing.

== Background and declaration ==
At the time of ETA's declaration, the most recent to date of its killings had been committed on 30 May 2003, whereas its last proven assassination attempt occurred on 17 February 2005. ETA had been briefly blamed for the 11 March 2004 Madrid train bombings, but it soon became clear that the attack was the work of radical Islamists. For the next two years, there had been some conjecture whether ETA was refraining from their previous level of violence out of weakness, out of a change of heart or tactics, or because the 11 March attacks had undercut support for violent political tactics.

On 22 March 2006 ETA sent a DVD message to the Basque Network Euskal Irrati-Telebista and the journals Gara and Berria with a communiqué from the organization announcing what it called a "permanent ceasefire" that was broadcast over Spanish TV. According to the spokeswoman for the organisation, the "ceasefire" would begin on Friday 24 March. In their communiqué, they stated that the French and Spanish governments should cooperate and respond positively to this new situation. On 23 March, Gara published an extended version of the communiqué. The calculated ambiguity of the term "permanent" (which was a novelty when compared to previous "ceasefire" declarations) was widely discussed by most observers, even though it was mostly regarded as a positive sign of ETA's will to quit its violent activities.

== Reactions to the declaration ==
Most political parties welcomed the news of a ceasefire on the part of ETA. The government (under the Spanish Socialist Workers' Party (PSOE) administration) displayed an optimistic and hopeful response to the announcement, although in official statements president Zapatero called for "prudence".

PP: The People's Party (headed by Mariano Rajoy) showed pessimism with regards to this announcement and claimed that it was only a pause for ETA, probably in the same fashion as the previous truce (declared by ETA in 1998, under president Aznar's administration). Rajoy called on the government to continue "fighting terrorism" and reject negotiations.

Basque Government: Juan José Ibarretxe called for the establishment of a negotiation table "without exclusions" (i.e. involving all the concerned political sectors, i.e., Batasuna, which is currently illegal).

Batasuna's position evolved from a cautious optimism into increasingly serious warnings against what they considered "a lack of resolve on the part of the Spanish government" and what they believed was "a will not to solve the conflict but to erode the Nationalist Left". The harshest of such warnings was issued on 5 December 2005, when they gave a press conference denouncing "continued repression" (in reference to the detentions of ETA members by the police) and warning that the peace process could "hardly continue in such conditions". After the Barajas bombing, Batasuna remained the only political party that considered that the "ceasefire" was still viable. An ETA communiqué released soon after the Barajas bombings stated the terrorist group's apparent will to continue negotiations. Five months later, on 5 June 2007, ETA released a statement affirming it considered the "ceasefire" to be over, warning attacks would be resumed at midnight that same day.

The 2006–2007 ETA "ceasefire" was a period of heightened political tension in Spain. The strategic interests of the concerned political parties and the mutual recriminations between Spanish politicians of acting with hidden agendas were often at the forefront of the discussions.

== Negotiations and incidents during the "ceasefire" ==
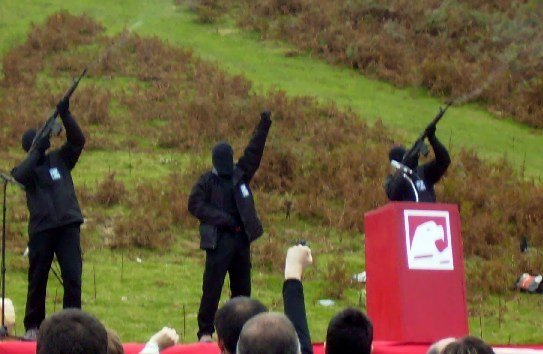
ETA members fire salvoes at Aritxulegi

On 23 September 2006 masked and armed ETA members took part in a political act in Aritxulegi (Gipuzkoa) and declared that the organization will "keep taking up arms" until achieving "independence and socialism in the Basque country". The militant claimed that "the fight is not a thing of the past. It is the present and the future". The statement was regarded by some as intended to put pressure on the talks with the Spanish government, which were announced on 17 September, and by some other analysts as a declaration of ETA's ultimate intentions, making clear that the organization will not disarm until every single one of their goals have been completely achieved. Spanish president José Luis Rodríguez Zapatero stressed in the Spanish Parliament that the Spanish Government would still keep its offer for talks despite the militant's statement.

In June, Spanish Prime Minister José Luis Rodríguez Zapatero announced that his government would begin negotiations with the ETA.

On 24 October 2006 a suspected ETA cell stole some 300 handguns, ammunition and spare parts in France.

On 4 November 2006 Gara newspaper published excerpts of ETA's bulletin Zutabe no.111, in which the organization pondered that "if the Spanish government doesn't fulfill its compromises and there are no visible steps, the peace process will be broken". ETA also announced that they would "make a renewed effort towards the negotiations with the Spanish government". ETA "laments that in the time elapsed since the March declaration of ceasefire (…) precious time has been wasted". They demanded from Spanish president, José Luis Rodríguez Zapatero "to give a positive answer" to two central issues: (1) "to the specific demand of the fulfilment of the commitments he adopted on leaving aside repression and ceasing attacks" and (2) "he will have to commit clearly to respect the will for an [independence] process in Euskal Herria, that is: the will of Basque citizens".

On 14 November, the Socialist Party admitted that the peace process was fraught with problems. Batasuna's staunch refusal to condemn terrorism did not help. Also, the hunger strike of ETA activist Iñaki de Juana Chaos led to Kale Borroka actions by some youths liked to the abertzale left. On 14 December, Batasuna's Pernando Barrena said that the peace process was "going nowhere". He accused the Socialist Party of making excessive demands to Batasuna.

== End of "ceasefire" ==
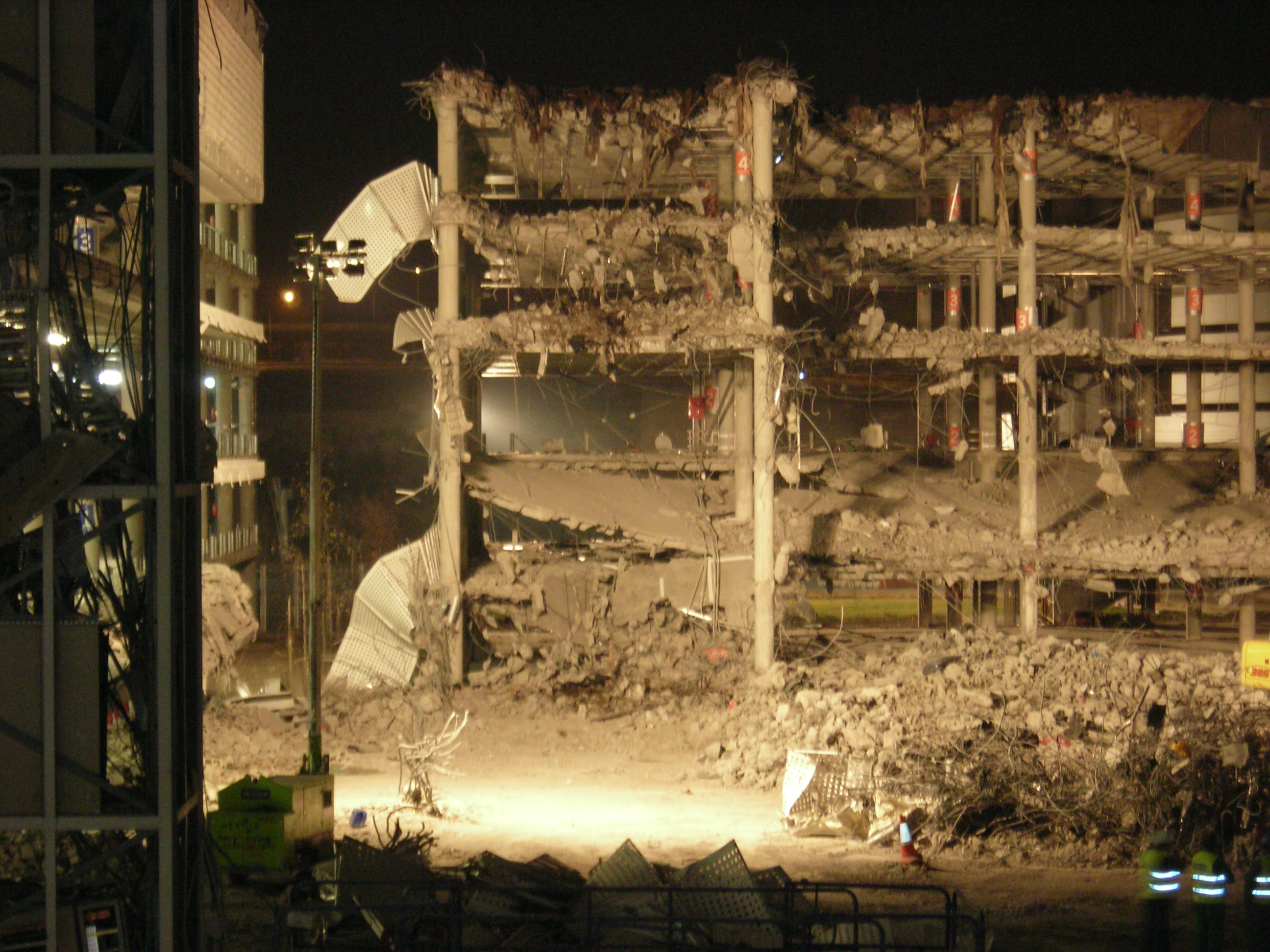
Ruins of the T4 parking days after the bombing.

On 30 December 2006, at 9:00 in the morning, after three confusing warning calls, ETA detonated a van bomb in a parking building at the Madrid Barajas international airport. The explosion caused the collapse of the building and killed two Ecuadorian immigrants who were napping inside their cars in the parking building. At 6:00 P.M., José Luis Rodríguez Zapatero released a statement informing that the "peace process" had been discontinued.

In November 2006 ETA warned the Spanish government that the so-called "peace process" was "in crisis." The concessions sought by ETA and its political supporters (which included the relocation of ETA inmates from jails all over Spain to penitentiaries located in the Basque region and the halting of arrests and trials of ETA suspects) had not been attended. It was reported that, before the attack, ETA reminded Rodríguez Zapatero about the 2004 Madrid train bombings (as a way to pressure the government with the possibility of an attack before upcoming elections), even though the source also states that ETA 'had nothing to do' with the attack itself.

On 4–5 January 2007, the Ertzaintza found a cache of 350 pounds of explosives in Atxondo (Biscay). Out of these, 220 pounds were ready for immediate use (only lacking a detonator).

On 9 January 2007, newspaper Gara published a letter on behalf of ETA, claiming responsibility for the 30 December 2006 bomb at Barajas airport in Madrid. ETA also claimed that the ceasefire was still in place despite the bombing. ETA extended their solidarity to the "collateral damage" (the two Ecuadorian immigrants killed by the explosion), assuring that the "objective of this armed action was not to cause victims" and blamed the government for the dead, in view of the alleged lack of diligence evacuating the building. They also accused the Government and the Spanish Socialist Workers' Party of creating obstacles for a democratic process.

=== Formal ending, subsequent ETA attacks and reactions ===
Despite the fact that all political parties and analysts in Spain -including those in the Basque country- and abroad considered the "ceasefire" ended with the Barajas bombing (accordingly, the negotiation tables were not resumed ever since that date) it was only weeks after, on 5 June 2007, that ETA released a communiqué through the Berria newspaper's web site formally announcing the end of the "permanent ceasefire" by midnight. ETA also announced that it would "act in all fronts in defence of Euskal Herria".

On 21 June 2007, Spanish police found 130 kg (285 pounds) of explosives in a car parked in the town of Ayamonte, near the Southern Portuguese border. The cache was suspected to belong to ETA, stoking fears that attacks would be imminent after the group announced the end of the "permanent ceasefire" on 5 June 2007.

On 9 October 2007, ETA members placed a bomb under the car of the bodyguard of a PSE-EE (Socialist Party of the Basque Country) council member of Galdakao. The bodyguard, Juan Carlos Domingo Galíndez, was seriously injured.

On 1 December 2007, members of ETA shot dead two Spanish civil guards in Southern France. They are the first fatalities blamed on ETA in nearly a year. The two unarmed plainclothes civil guard officers were in Capbreton, France, to meet with French police about joint operations against ETA, which traditionally uses France as a base for its attacks in Spain. The civil guards entered a cafe for their breakfast where three ETA suspects were by chance. The suspects recognized them and ambushed them on the parking, fleeing then in a car, later leaving it to commandeer a second car.

At the beginning of 2008, ETA said that it would base its calls for independence on the Kosovo status.

On 21 February 2008, two former ETA leaders, José Luis Álvarez Santacristina (previously responsible for ETA's political positions) and Kepa Pikabea (previously responsible for ETA's armed actions) both serving jail sentences at that time, released a joint note to the press stating that "ETA did not take into account the opinion of the majority of ETA inmates at the time of breaking the most recent truce" and that the "armed struggle is useless and an obstacle" for Basque nationalism. Days before the note was released, they had both been expelled from the ETA inmates collective.
