= Isaías Carrasco =

Spanish politician (1964 – 2008)

Isaías Carrasco (11 June 1964 – 7 March 2008) was a Basque politician, affiliated with the PSE. He was shot dead when he left his house in Tolosa de Mondragón on March 7, 2008, two days ahead of general elections in Spain by Beñat Aginagalde, a member of ETA.

The electoral campaign was suspended on the part of the politicians, in response to the murder of councilman Carrasco. He was shot in the presence of his wife and daughter. According to sources of the investigation, a disguised gunman approached him from behind and shot him three times; once in the nape of the neck and twice in the chest. The emergency services transferred him to the hospital in very serious condition. Shortly after the 14:00 local time (13:00 UTC) the Basque Department of Interior confirmed his death.

Carrasco placed sixth in the electoral lists of the PSE-EE in the municipal elections of 2007. Four socialist legislators were chosen and the municipal government of Mondragón was handed over to Basque Nationalist Action (ANV, whose activities were suspended in February 2008 by judge Baltasar Garzón for a supposed violation of the 2003 Parties Law). Carrasco had resigned to run; prior to the campaign he worked in a public company and did not hold any public office.
