= July 1979 Madrid bombings =

Series of terrorist attacks with explosives by ETA

- Part of the Basque conflict
- Location: Madrid, Spain
- Date: 29 July 1979; 1301 (UTC+2)
- Attack type: bombs
- Deaths: 7
- Injuries: 100+
- Perpetrator: ETA political-military

The July 1979 Madrid bombings were a series of bomb attacks carried out by ETA political-military (ETA-pm), a faction of the armed Basque separatist group ETA. The attacks, consisting of coordinated bombings in Barajas Airport and the train stations of Atocha and Chamartín, killed 7 people and injured a further 100. The bombings occurred a day after two attacks in Bilbao and San Sebastian, with both attacks killing two people.

== The attacks ==
=== Barajas airport ===
The first bomb was placed on the ground floor of the airport, in the domestic arrivals section near an information desk. The bomb consisted of 6 kilos of Amatol and exploded at 13:01, destroying nearby shops, toilets and windows. Broken glass from the windows led to numerous injuries, among them a soldier and a member of the Guardia Civil. Taxis were used to transport some of the injured to La Paz clinic. The bomb killed three people.

=== Chamartín railway station ===
The bomb was placed in a locker near a waiting room. The explosion occurred at 13:10 and created panic, with many fleeing from the building towards exits, only to return a few minutes later when the realised that they had abandoned their luggage. Dorothea Fertig, a student from Germany, was decapitated as a result of the bomb.

=== Atocha railway station ===
The most serious attack occurred at Atocha at 13:15 with 3 instantly killed and 40 wounded due to the structure of the lockers in which the bomb had been placed.

The three attacks caused a total of 23 million pesetas worth of damage.

== Telephone warnings ==
There was confusion and controversy over the timings of telephone warnings made by ETA to the Euskadi Press organisation in the Basque Country and the forwarding of the warnings to the relevant agencies. Euskadi Press claimed that they had received the telephone warning about the three bombs at 12:00, an hour before the first explosion and had telephoned the police chief of San Sebastian two minutes later, with the latter promising to inform police in Madrid. Euskadi Press then attempted to phone various newspapers in Madrid, among them El País, but found the offices empty as it was a Sunday, they claimed that they had then phoned the EFE agency in Madrid. The civil governor of Madrid, Juan Jose Roson, claimed that Efe had only received the call from Euskadi Press at 12:40 and that Efe had then informed Madrid authorities at 12:43, less than 20 minutes before the first explosion. Roson argued that this had made evacuation impossible in the limited time available. For their part, ETA-pm accused the authorities of not acting on the warnings, in order to discredit the organisation.

== Reactions ==
The attacks were condemned by the Basque left, including parties regarded as close to ETA.
