= Francisco Javier López Peña =

- Born: February 14, 1958; Galdácano Biscay, Spain
- Status: Awaiting trial
- Died: 30 March 2013 (aged 55); Paris, France
- Other name: Thierry
- Known for: Military Chief
- Term: 1991 - 2008
- Political party: ETA

Francisco Javier López Peña alias Thierry (14 February 1958 – 30 March 2013) was a member of Basque separatist group ETA. He headed its political leadership. On 20 May 2008, López Peña was arrested in Bordeaux, France, during a joint operation between French and Spanish police officials.

== ETA activity ==
López Peña went on the run from law enforcement in 1983. On March 18, 1991, following the arrest of Jesus Arcauz Arana ("Josu of Mondragon") in Biarritz, France, ETA's military leader, López Peña moved into the upper echelons of ETA's leadership.

In 2006, he was said to be responsible for calling off the negotiations with the Spanish government by ordering the Barajas Airport bombing that came on December 30. In this regard, López Peña has been described as hawkish.

The spate of attacks in early 2008 and the killing of a Civil Guard member was alleged to have occurred at Lopen Peña's behest.

== Crimes ==
López Peña's first tangle with the law occurred on February 14, 1983 when he was arrested in Bayonne, France. He was convicted of criminal conspiracy and sent to prison.

On July 8, 2005 he was sentenced, in absentia, by the Correctional Tribunal of Paris (France) to 8 years' imprisonment for criminal conspiracy.

On February 5, 2007 Central Examining Court No. 5 of the National High Court ordered his arrest and incarceration for collaboration with terrorist or armed bands.

When he was arrested on May 20, 2008, López Peña was in a Bordeaux apartment with three other ETA members, including Ainhoa Ozaeta Mendiondo, Igor Suberbiola and Jon Salaberria. They were reported to not have resisted arrest. When police raided the flat in Bouscat, which had been under surveillance for a week, they found two handguns, a homemade rocket-launcher and several detonators. Six were arrested, including Angel Arrauzpide-Cruz, considered by police to be the head of an ETA reservist cell, and a former mayor of a Basque city arrested earlier that year, who is said to have led police to López Peña.

On May 26, 2008, López Peña along with four others arrested in the same week were remanded to a court in Paris. The group were expected to be placed under judicial investigation for "criminal association with a terrorist organization."

== International reactions ==
López Peña's arrest was widely approved.

=== France ===
A statement from the French Prime Minister called López Peña "one of the historic leaders" of ETA, and added that he had been wanted by police for 20 years. The statement also said, "The success of this operation illustrates again the remarkable quality of the anti-terrorist cooperation between France and Spain."

=== Spain ===
Spanish Prime Minister José Luis Rodríguez Zapatero hailed the arrests as "another important step in the victory of democracy against terror." He added that the raid had "delivered a severe blow to the leadership of the terrorist group ETA."

Spanish Interior Minister Alfredo Pérez Rubalcaba called the arrests "the hardest setback" ever for ETA. He went on to say "This is not just another police operation in the sense that one of the detained, Francisco Javier López Peña, is in all likelihood at this moment the person with most political and military weight in the terrorist group ETA." Upon his return to Madrid, precipitated by arrest, Rubalcaba stated that he believed these leaders "are behind or even ordered the latest killings." Rubalcaba called the arrests a big victory in Spain's decades-old battle against ETA, "We are closer to the end, but this is not the end." He added "The four had a decisive participation in the attacks in Barajas and Castellon", and hence "It is an operation of an enormous importance." Luis Ignacio Iruretagoyena was also detained, of whom Rubalcaba said, "Iruretagoyena is considered by police to be the maximum expert in the making of bombs within ETA."

On May 27, Rubalcaba said that the state is stronger and ETA is crippled. e announced plans to recruit more police for the security services in dealing with ETA. However, he warned that while the state is "stronger than ever", the capacity for ETA to "harm us a lot" still existed. In speaking before the Interior Committee at the Spanish Parliament he hailed the arrest of López Peña as a critical blow to the group.

On May 30, ETA released a statement exclaiming despite the arrest "the fight for an independent Basque homeland will continue". The statement, sent to Basque newspaper Gara, read "If there is no adequate attention to the root of the problem, the conflict will persist." It went on to state, "they (French and Spanish government) will be forcing us to keep on fighting."

== Death ==
After suffering a heart attack on the 30th of March, López Peña was hospitalized in Paris. His death came in the same month as other Basque prisoners' deaths. His family complained that they had only learned of his death when they came to visit him.
