= Abertzale =

Basque word that refers to Basque nationalism

Abertzale (Basque pronunciation: [aberts̻ale]; English: "patriot", literally "fond of the fatherland") is a Basque term usually referring to people or political groups who are associated with Basque nationalism.

Although the term is a synonym of "patriot", its common use in Basque mainly refers to Basque nationalism, whereas in the Spanish language abertzale (also spelled aberzale) means "Basque nationalist".

The use of the term by members and sympathizers of Herri Batasuna, and the fact that the followers of the Basque Nationalist Party (Partido Nacionalista Vasco, PNV) call themselves jeltzales more than abertzales, has brought about a situation where in the Spanish language the word is at times associated with that particular leftist current of Basque nationalism.

Several organizations past and present have used this word in their official Basque-language names:

- Abertzaleen Batasuna (Unity of the Abertzales): A political party in the French Basque Country.
- Emakume Abertzale Batza (Women's Abertzale Organization), onetime women's section of the PNV, made illegal by the rebel junta in Burgos during the Spanish Civil War.
- Euskal Abertzaletasunaren Museoa (Museum of Basque Nationalism).
- The name Eusko Abertzaleak (Basque Patriots) is used by various parliamentary and town council groups of the Basque Nationalist Party. In fact, Eusko Alkartasuna was meant to be founded under the name Eusko Abertzaleak, but the Basque Nationalist Party registered this name first.
- Eusko Abertzale Ekintza (Basque Nationalist Action), a Basque nationalist and leftist party.
- Ezker Mugimendu Abertzalea (Leftist Abertzale Movement): A political party in the French Basque Country.
- Gazte Abertzaleak (Abertzale Youths): the youth group of the Spanish Basque political party Eusko Alkartasuna, left of the PNV but not aligned with ETA or Batasuna.
- Koordinadora Abertzale Sozialista (Abertzale Socialist Coordinating Council, KAS).
- The names Ezker Abertzalea (Izquierda Abertzale or "Abertzale Left"), Nafarroako Sozialista Abertzaleak (Abertzale Socialist of Navarre) and Araba, Bizkai eta Gipuzkoako Sozialista Abertzaleak (Abertzale Socialists of Álava, Biscay, and Gipuzkoa) have been used by various parliamentary groups of Herri Batasuna and Euskal Herritarrok in different parliaments.

The term ezker abertzalea (abertzale left) is used to refer to parties or organisations which are Basque nationalist, but at the same time, left-wing. This may be Marxist, communist, socialist or social-democratic. The term is used to distinguish these organisations from the usual traditionalist or conservative character of the Basque Nationalist Party.
