= Legutio =

Town and municipality in northern Spain

- Municipality
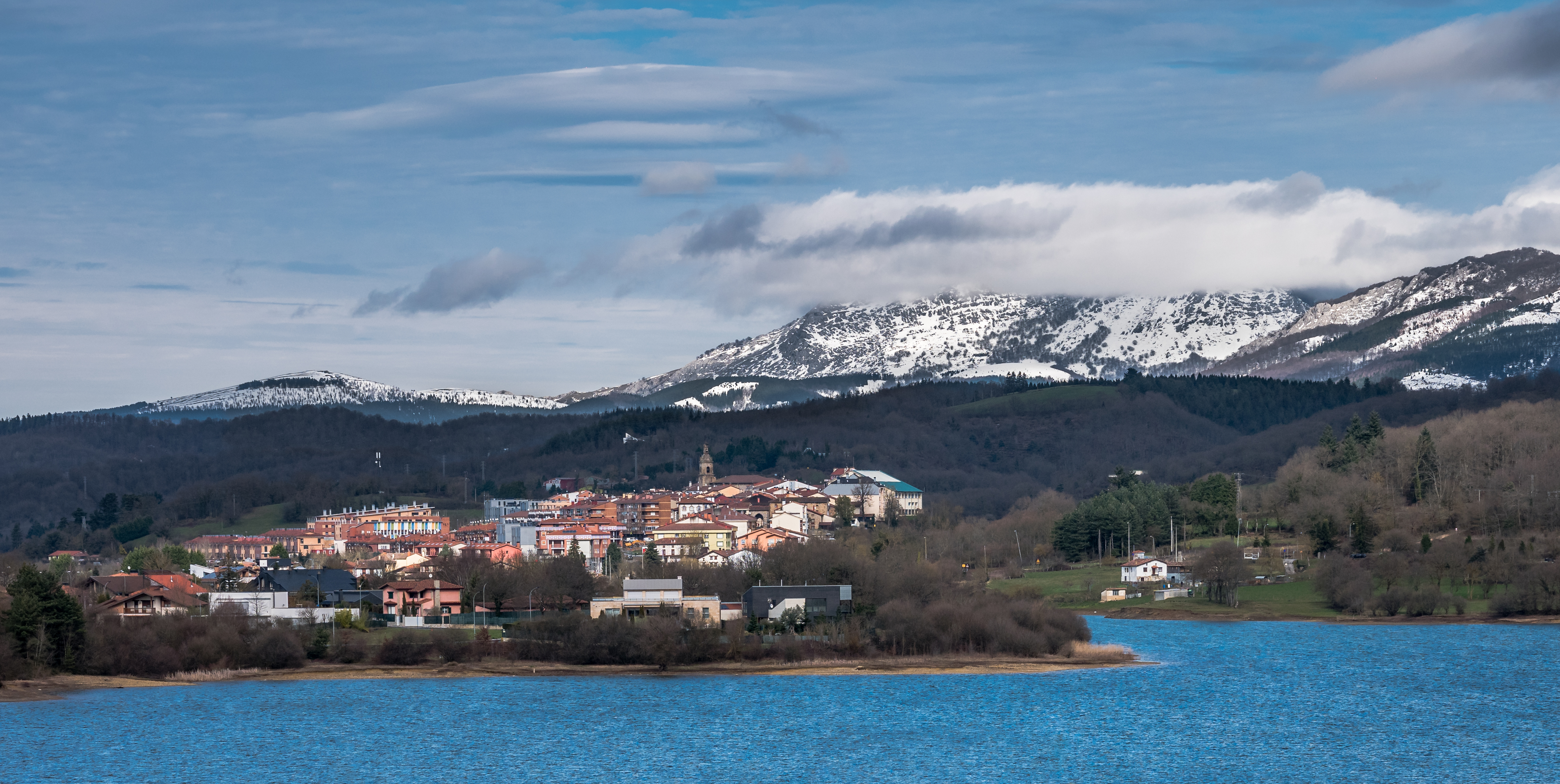
- Legutio and the Urrunaga Reservoir

- Flag

- Location of Legutio within the Basque Country Legutio (Spain)
- Coordinates: 42°58′59″N 2°37′59″W
- Country: Spain
- Autonomous Community: Basque Country
- Province: Álava
- Comarca: Gorbeialdea

Government
  - Mayor: Nerea Bengoa García de Cortázar (EAJ-PNV)

Area
  - Total: 45.86 km^{2} (17.71 sq mi)
- Elevation (AMSL): 570 m (1,870 ft)

Population (2023)
  - Total: 2,048
  - Density: 44.66/km^{2} (115.7/sq mi)
- Time zone: UTC+1 (CET)
  - Summer (DST): UTC+2 (CEST (GMT +2))
- Postal code: 01170

Legutio (also known as Legutiano; Villarreal de Álava in Spanish) is a town and municipality located in the province of Álava, in the Basque Country, northern Spain. It includes the concejos of Elosu, Goiain, Urrunaga and Urbina.
