= Gara (newspaper) =

Spanish Basque newspaper

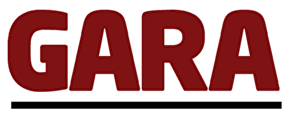
Logo of Gara

Music festival in support of Gara, Donostia (San Sebastián), 2019

Gara (Basque: We Are) is a bilingual (Basque/Spanish) leftwing Basque Nationalist newspaper published in the city of Donostia-San Sebastián in the Basque Autonomous Community. The newspaper's target market comprises the area of the Basque Country, but its circulation is largely constrained to the Southern Basque territory (Spain), since Spanish is mainly used rather than French.

Gara, the third most-read newspaper in the Basque Autonomous Community and Navarre, was first published on 30 January 1999 as successor to the leftist and Basque nationalist newspaper Egin, which had been shut down by the noted prosecuting judge Baltasar Garzón in a highly controversial move on 15 July 1998. The case was dismissed and defendants acquitted, with the final verdict stating that no illicit activity was engaged by Egin (2009).

On 12 March 2004, ETA denied in a communique to Gara and the Basque public broadcaster EITB its involvement in the March 11, 2004 Madrid attacks. In July 2008, the newspaper denounced that its communications were being tapped by the police, and diverted to the Spanish National Police headquarters in Pamplona.

Despite the illegal closure of the newspapers Egin and Egunkaria by the Spanish justice courts, the €4.7 million debt incurred by Egin with the Social Security was after its shutdown shouldered over to the new daily Gara, as an "ideological successor" to Egin. By May 2019, the media outlet looks to counter the Spanish government's and justice system's attempts to subdue it by searching new subscribers and organizing special events to garner support and financial viability.

On 14 July 2008, sources at the newspaper claimed that Gara’s offices in Pamplona were being bugged by the National Police.

== See also ==
- List of newspapers
