= Kale borroka =

Urban riots in the Spanish Basque Country

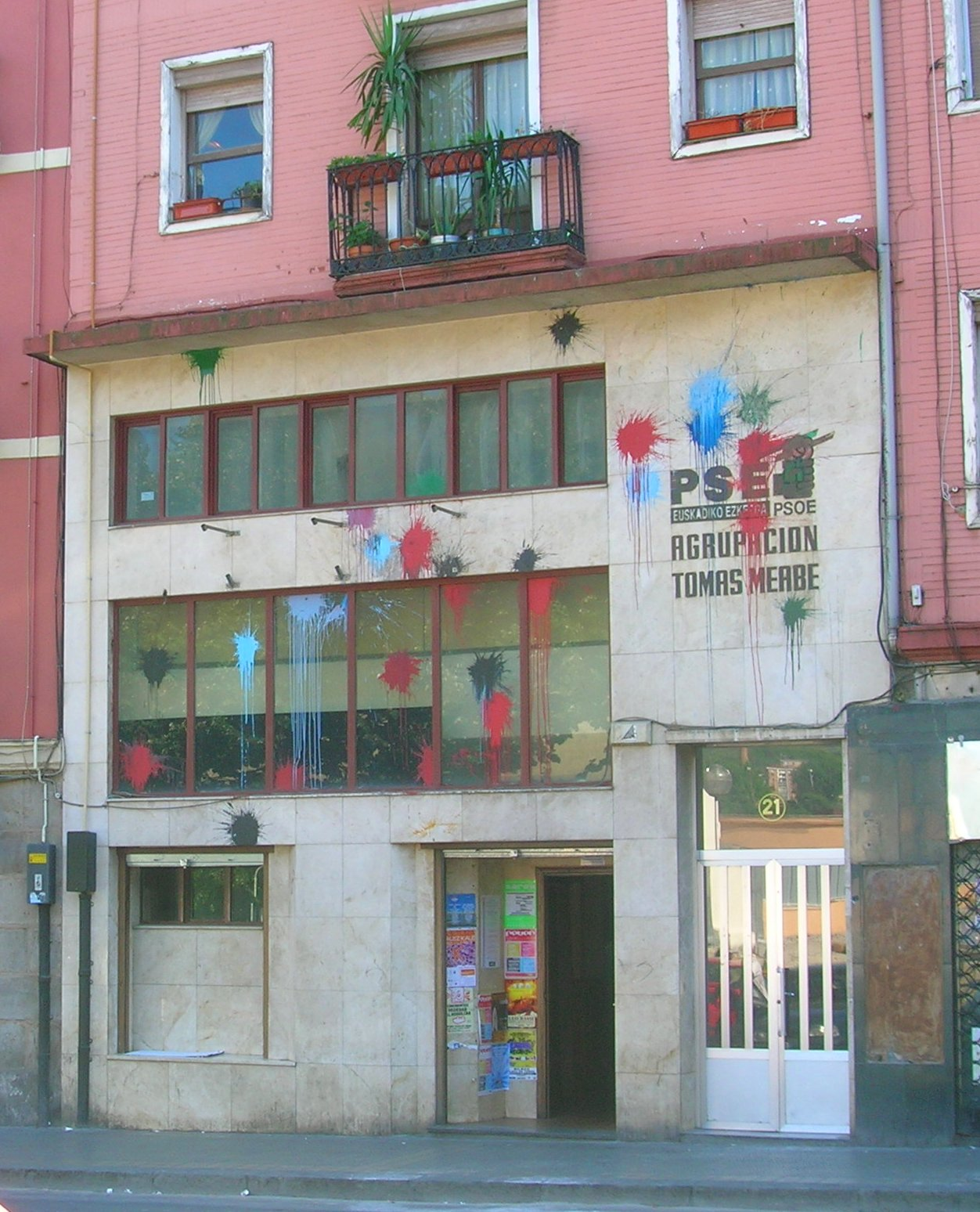
A PSE-EE club in Bilbao attacked with paint blots.

Kale borroka (Basque pronunciation: [kale boroka], "Street Fighting") refers to urban guerrilla actions carried out by Basque nationalists in the southern Basque Country who are integrated into the abertzale left. Along with ETA, the kale borroka was the only remaining armed faction of Basque nationalists in the Basque Conflict.

Their most common actions included: attacking offices of political parties, especially the Spanish Socialist Workers' Party and the People's Party, but also other parties such as the Basque Nationalist Party and the Navarrese People's Union; attacking the property of people linked to these groups (burning cars, attacking housing); attacking and destroying ATMs, bank offices, public transport; and rioting using molotov cocktails, burning trash containers and even private vehicles in demonstrations, etc.

During ETA's ceasefire from March 2006 to 2007, the kale borroka did not cease to act, but its activities have been decreasing since it peaked in the mid-1990s.
