= Basque nationalism =

Nationalist movement

Flag of the Basque Country

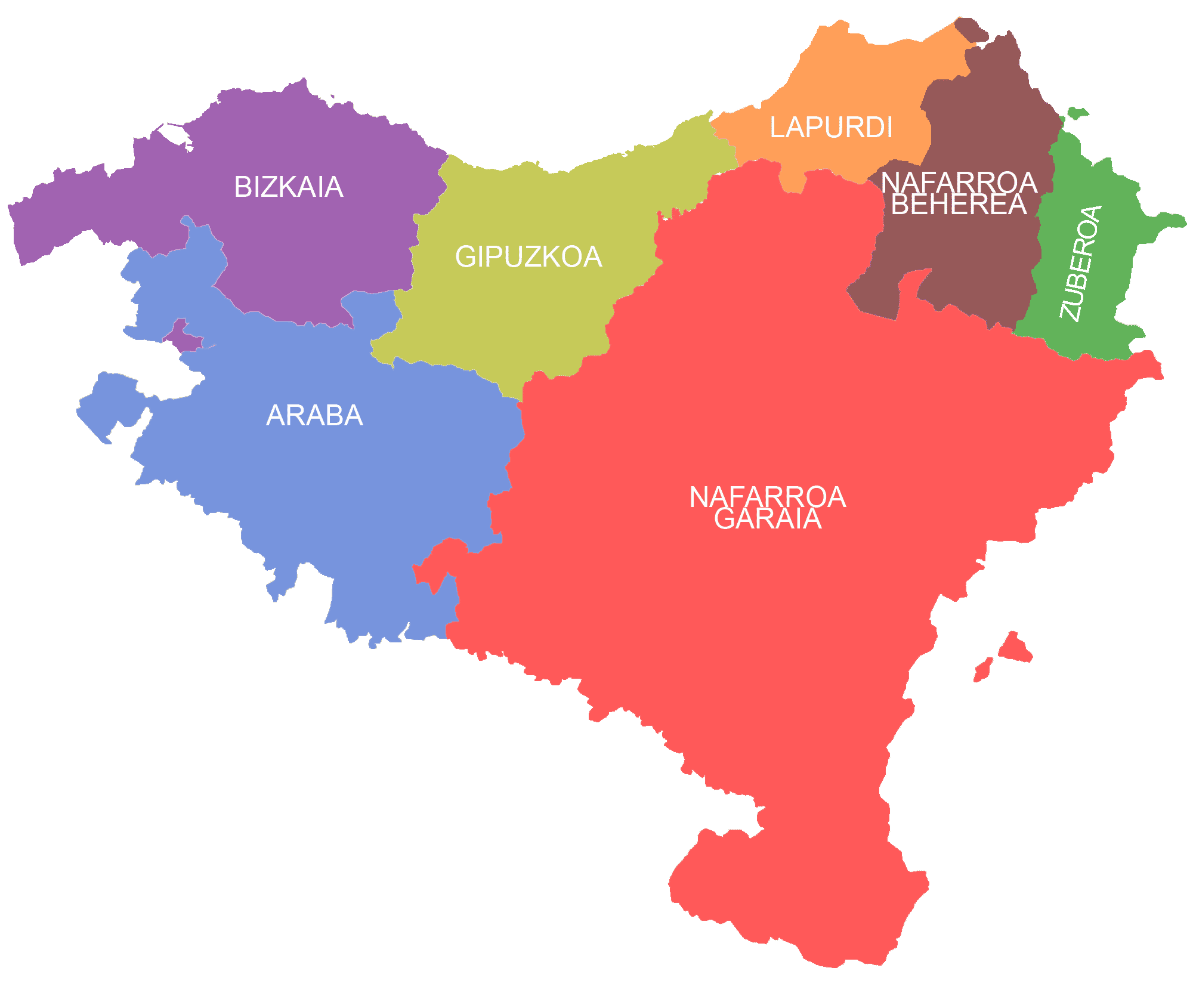
The seven historical provinces usually included in the definition of the greater region of the Basque Country.

Basque nationalism (Basque: eusko abertzaletasuna [eus̺ko abeɾts̻aletas̺una]; Spanish: nacionalismo vasco; French: nationalisme basque) is a form of nationalism that asserts that Basques, an ethnic group indigenous to the western Pyrenees, are a nation and promotes the political unity of the Basques, today split between Spain and France. Since its inception in the late 19th century, Basque nationalism has included movements supportive of Basque independence.

Basque nationalism, spanning three different regions in two states (the Basque Autonomous Community and Navarre in Spain, and the French Basque Country in France), is "irredentist in nature" as it favours political unification of all the Basque-speaking provinces.

== History ==
=== Fueros and Carlism ===
Basque nationalism is rooted in Carlism and the loss, by the laws of 1839 and 1876, of the Ancien Régime relationship between the Spanish Basque provinces and the crown of Spain. During this period, the reactionary and the liberal brand of the pro-fueros movement pleaded for the maintenance of the fueros system and territorial autonomy against the centralizing pressures from liberal or conservative governments in Madrid. The Spanish government suppressed the fueros after the Third Carlist War.

The fueros were the native decision making and justice system issued from consuetudinary law prevailing in the Basque territories and Pyrenees. They are first recorded in the Kingdom of Navarre, confirming its charter system also across the western Basque territories during the High Middle Ages. In the wake of Castile's conquest of Gipuzkoa, Álava and Durango (1200), the fueros were partially ratified by the kings of Castile and acted as part of the Basque legal system dealing with matters regarding the political ties of the Basque districts with the crown. The Fueros guaranteed the Basques a separate position in Spain with their own tax and political status. While its corpus is extensive, prerogatives contained in them set out for one that Basques were not subject to direct levee to the Castilian army, although many volunteered.

=== Sabino Arana ===
The native Basque institutions and laws were abolished in 1876 after the Third Carlist War (called the Second in the Basque context), and replaced by the Basque Economic Agreements. The levelling process with other Spanish regions disquieted the Basques. According to Sabino Arana's views, the Biscayan (and Basque) personality was being diluted in the idea of an exclusive Spanish nation fostered by centralist authorities in Madrid. Arana was inspired by his brother Luis, a co-designer of the Basque flag ikurriña (1895), and a major nationalist figure after Sabino's death (1903).

Arana felt that not only the Basque personality was endangered but also its former religious institutions, like Church or the Society of Jesus, which still often spoke in Basque to its parishioners, unlike school or administration. Sabino characterized Catholicism as a sort of shelter for Basque personality. This became a point of contention with other personalities holding like views and clustering around Arana's manifesto Bizkaya por su independencia (1892). Later industrialist and prominent Basque nationalist Ramon de la Sota dismissed Sabino's positions of Catholicism as inherent to the national issue.

In 1893, the Gamazada popular uprising erupted in Navarre against the breach by the Spanish government of several foundations of the treaties ending the Carlist Wars (1841, 1876). Arana eagerly supported the Navarrese outbreak by travelling to the territory and participating. The widespread protest in Navarre sparked solidarity in Biscay. In 1893, after a support meeting held in Gernika attended by pro-fueros personalities, a group led by Arana overtly blamed Spain for the current state of matters, going on to set a Spanish flag ablaze. This rebellion, called the Sanrocada, is held as the beginning of political Basque nationalism.

In 1895, the Basque Nationalist Party was founded around Arana (PNV in its Spanish acronym, EAJ in Basque). His nationalism shifted from a focus on Biscay to the rest of Basque territories. The program of Arana was specified as follows:

The Basques represent a nation, with their own history and culture. This nation consists of race, language and an own political system (the foruak). The liberty of Euzkadi [term created by Sabino Arana to refer to the Basque Country] has been destroyed by France and, mainly, by Spain, who subjugated by force the different Basque territories, including the former Kingdom of Navarre’s territories, with the exception La Rioja, as well as Lapurdi and Zuberoa. As a consequence of the lack of independence of the country, the country has a political despondency, which has its last expression in the suppression of the Basque Traditional Laws and its own institutional system, the economic submission towards France and Spain, and the disappearance of the signs of identity. The solution to all these problems is to restore independence, by breaking the political ties with France and Spain, and the construction of a Basque state with its own sovereignty.

By the end of the 19th century, Arana differed clearly from the Carlists, his initial background. He accompanied his views with an ideology centred on the purity of the Basque race and its alleged moral supremacy over other Spaniards (a derivation of the system of limpieza de sangre of Modern-Age Spain), and deep opposition to the mass-immigration of other Spaniards to the Basque Country. The immigration had started after the Industrial Revolutions boom of manufacturing related to the ore exportation to England and privatization of communal lands and exploitations (mines) as the fueros were lost.

Arana died in 1903 months after releasing a controversial manifesto renouncing his former tenets while in prison for supporting Cuban independence, and just months after the Basque leader congratulated US president Theodore Roosevelt for its support to Cuba. The nature of that document is still subject to discussion. Luis Arana took the reins of the Basque Nationalist Party.

In the early 20th century, Basque nationalism, developed from a nucleus of enthusiasts (non-native Basque speakers themselves) in Bilbao to incorporate the agrarian Carlists in Biscay, and Gipuzkoa. The seeds of Seminal Basque nationalism bloomed also in Navarre and Álava early on (Aranzadi, Irujo, Agirre, etc.) on the heat of the Gamazada (1893–1894).

=== Modern history ===
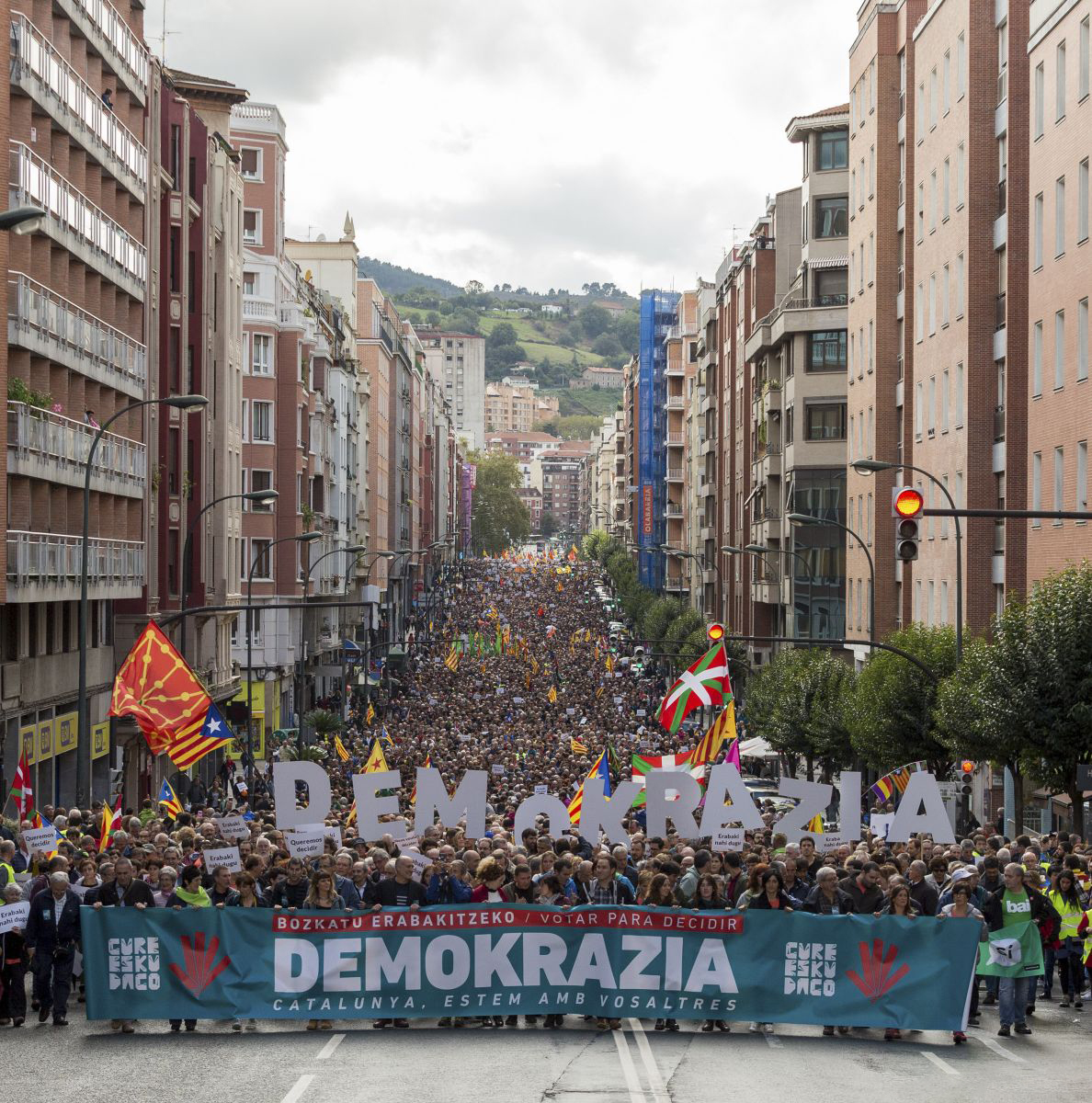
Demonstration in Bilbao in solidarity with the Catalan independence referendum on 16 September 2017

The movement survived without major problems the dictatorship of Miguel Primo de Rivera under the guise of cultural and athletic associations. The Basque Nationalist Party split in the early 20s, and Comunión Nacionalista Vasca was created. Basque nationalists allied with Carlism in support of the Catholic Church as a barrier against leftist anti-clericalism in most of the Basque provinces, although alliances started to change with the coming of the Second Spanish Republic (1931).

By the start of the Second Spanish Republic, a small cluster of secularist Basque nationalists had sown the seeds of the EAE-ANV, while PNV clung to its traditionalist Catholicism. However, failure by a Carlist faction to back up the Basque statute in 1932 and the radicalization of their anti-Republican discourse, opened the Basque nationalists to new alliances with Republican and leftist parties, gradually shifting to a Christian-Democrat position willing to some sort of compromise with the left.

In 1936, the main part of the Christian-Democrat PNV sided with the Second Spanish Republic in the Spanish Civil War. The promise of autonomy was valued over the ideological differences, especially on the religious matter, and PNV decided to support the legal republican government. After stopping the far-right military rebels in Intxorta (Biscay-Gipuzkoa border), autonomy was achieved in October 1936. A republican autonomous Basque government was established, with José Antonio Agirre (PNV) as Lehendakari (president) and ministers from the PNV and other republican parties (mainly leftist Spanish parties).

However, in 1937, roughly halfway through the war, Basque troops, then under control of the Autonomous Basque Government surrendered in an action brokered by the Basque church and the Vatican in Santoña to the Italian allies of General Franco on condition that the Basque heavy industry and economy was left untouched.

For many leftists in Spain, the surrender of Basque troops in Santoña (Santander) is known as the Treason of Santoña. Many of the nationalist Basque soldiers were pardoned if they joined the Francoist army in the rest of the Northern front. Basque nationalists submitted, went underground, or were sent to prison, and the movement's political leaders fled. Small groups escaped to the Americas, France and Benelux, of which only a minority returned after the restoration of democracy in Spain in the late seventies, or before.

During World War II, the exiled PNV government attempted to join the Allies and settled itself in New York to gain American recognition and support, but soon after the war finished, Franco became an American ally in the context of the Cold War, depriving the PNV of any chance of power in the Basque Country.

=== Political violence and devolved autonomy ===
In 1959, young nationalists (abertzaleak) founded the separatist group Euskadi Ta Askatasuna (ETA; "Basque Homeland and Liberty"). Its activism—paintings, pitching Basque flags, pamphlets—escalated into violence after shocking revelations emerged of torture practised by Spanish police on Basque activists during repression in the mid-1960s. By that time, ETA was adopting a Marxist revolutionary theory. Inspired by movements like those of Fidel Castro in Cuba and Ho Chi Minh in Vietnam, the group aimed to establish an independent socialist Basque Country through violence. ETA's first confirmed assassinations occurred in 1968, thereafter including violence, even killing, as a practice—theory of action-repression-action. At an ideological level, instead of race, the organization stressed the importance of language and customs.

When Spain re-emerged as a democracy in 1978, autonomy was restored to the Basques, who achieved a degree of self-government without precedent in modern Basque history. Thus, based on the fueros and their Statute of Autonomy, Basques have their own police corps and manage their own public finances. The Basque Autonomous Community has been led by the nationalist and Christian Democratic PNV since it was reinstated in the early 1980s, except in the period 2009–2012, when the PSE-EE led the regional government. The left-wing Basque independentist EH Bildu has been the main opposition party since its formation in 2012.

In Navarre, traditionally, Basque nationalism did not manage to reach the government of the autonomous community, the latter being usually controlled by the Navarrese regionalists of the UPN, often with the support of the PSN, but Basque nationalist parties ran many small and medium-sized town councils, where most ethnic basques and basque speakers are located. In 2015, Uxue Barkos became the first Basque nationalist president of Navarre with her coalition Geroa Bai, which includes the PNV, and since 2019 has been part of subsequent PSN governments. EH Bildu has also notably grown its influence in the region, taking over the mayoralty of Pamplona in 2023, and being key in the Navarrese parliament.

Although France is a centralized state, Abertzaleen Batasuna, a Basque nationalist party, maintained a presence in some municipalities through local elections until late 2000s. In 2007, the Basque nationalist electoral coalition and later political party Euskal Herria Bai was formed. They obtained regional representation in 2015, and in 2024 they obtained one seat in the National Assembly, as a part of the New Popular Front.

According to a 2026 government poll, only 24% of the Basque population supported Euskadi's independence, while 37% were manifestly against. Around 39% of respondents felt as Basque as Spanish, while 18% stated they felt solely Basque.

On 19 July 2026, four separatists beat a young man to the ground in Bilbao for wearing a Spanish flag following the FIFA World Cup final.

== Basque nationalist organizations ==
=== Political parties and coalitions ===
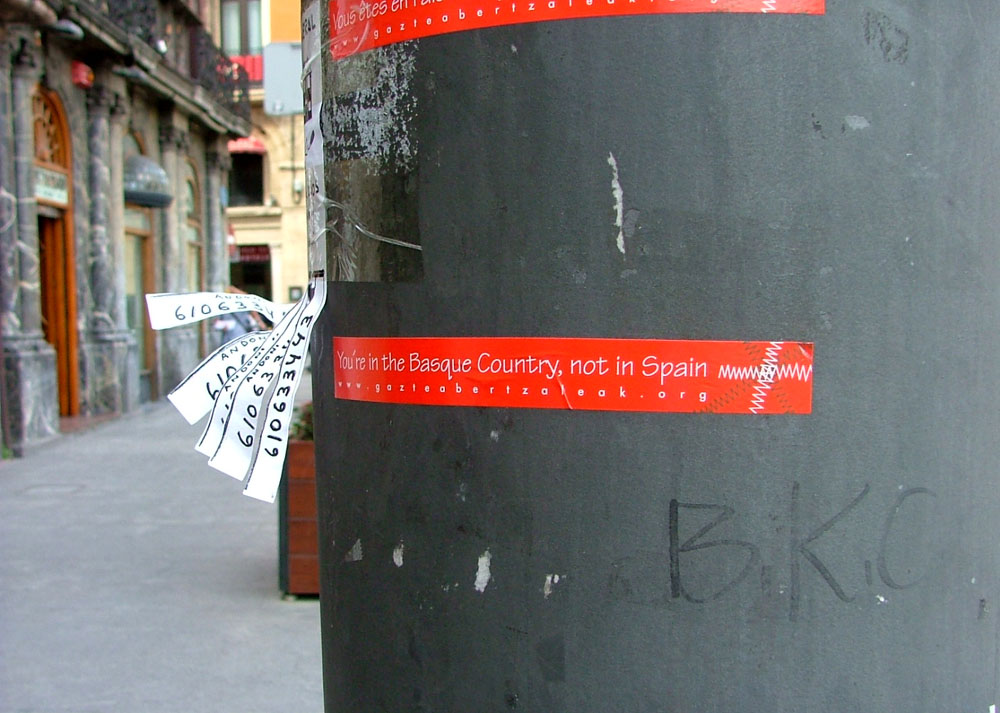
"You're in the Basque Country, not in Spain" – an example of Basque nationalism on a Bilbao lamp post. The sticker includes the website address of Gazte Abertzaleak.

==== Active ====
- EH Bildu, political coalition formed in 2011.
  - Sortu.
  - Eusko Alkartasuna.
- The Basque Nationalist Party (EAJ–PNV), formerly also known as the Basque Nationalist Communion (CNV).
- Geroa Bai, political coalition in Navarre.
  - Geroa Socialverdes, political party in Navarra formed in 2020.
  - Batzarre, a political party in Navarre.
- Euskal Herria Bai, political party in the northern Basque Country
- Jarki (political organisation), a socialist independentist organisation formed in 2017.

==== Inactive or defunct ====
- Amaiur, political coalition formed for the 2011 Spanish general election.
- Aralar, leftist political party.
- Euskadiko Ezkerra, merged into PSE–EE.
  - Euskal Ezkerra, a splinter group of Euskadiko Ezkerra.
- Eusko Abertzale Ekintza, leftist political party.
- Herri Batasuna, main representative of the abertzale left until its ban in Spain on the grounds of links with ETA. Succeed by the also banned Euskal Herritarrok and Batasuna.
- Nafarroa Bai, Navarrese political coalition.
- Zutik, leftist party.

=== Organizations ===
- Askatasuna, support for ETA prisoners
- Basque Workers' Solidarity, trade union
- Enbata
- ETA, separatist terrorist organization operating mainly in the Spanish Basque Country
- Etxerat, relatives' and friends' support group of individuals subjected to state repression
- ESAIT, support for the Basque National teams in different sports
- Gestoras pro-Amnistía, support for ETA prisoners
- Herria 2000 Eliza, Catholic movement
- Ikasle Abertzaleak, Group of Basque nationalist students
- Iparretarrak, violently clandestine organization operating in the French part of the Basque Country
- Irrintzi, armed organization of the French Basque Country
- Jagi-Jagi, former magazine
- LAB, leftist trade union
- Senideak, relatives of Basque activists (mostly ETA members) in prison
- Segi, Batasuna's youth group
- Udalbiltza, assembly of city councillors
- Gazte Abertzaleak, the youth group of the Spanish Basque political party Eusko Alkartasuna, left of the PNV but not aligned with ETA or Batasuna

== See also ==
- Basque Country independence
- Athletic Bilbao
- Basque Republic
- Carlism
- Eusko Abendaren Ereserkia
- José Antonio Aguirre
- Iñaki Kijera Zelarain
- Ikurriña
- Navarrese nationalism
- Politics of France
- Politics of Spain
- Sabino Arana
