= Quijera =

Origin
- Region of origin: Spain

Quijera or Kijera is a Spanish surname that may refer to:

== Quijera ==
- Iñaki Quijera Celarain (1961–1979), Basque protester
- Manu Quijera (born 1998), Spanish javelin thrower
- Nicolás Quijera, Spanish javelin thrower

== Kijera ==
- Gorka Kijera, Spanish footballer
