= Basque National Liberation Movement prisoners =

Spanish political movement prisoners

Many people have been imprisoned, placed on remand, or otherwise kept in custody due to their illegal activity in support of the Basque National Liberation Movement (MLNV using its Spanish acronym).

Most individuals linked to the MLNV currently serving out their sentences in prisons of Spain, France and other countries were convicted for their involvement with Euskadi Ta Askatasuna (ETA) at the moment of their arrest, and for other offences such as murder, attempted murder, participating in terrorism and kidnapping. Some were convicted only for being a member of ETA, while others were not members of ETA but have been imprisoned for collaborating with it, or have been convicted of other offences such as belonging to illegal organizations like Gestoras pro Amnistía or SEGI, belonging to or trying to rebuild banned political parties such as Askatasuna and Batasuna, participating in Kale borroka, or for the "public glorification of terrorism", an offence incorporated into the Spanish Criminal Code in 1995.

Many supporters of the Basque nationalist left consider ETA and MLNV convicts currently in Spanish and French prisons to be political prisoners, the majority of whom are represented by the Basque Political Prisoners Collective (EPPK under its Basque acronym). Some organizations like Etxerat have spent many years campaigning for the rights of Basque prisoners, with a special focus on bringing dispersed prisoners back to the Basque Country and the release of seriously ill prisoners.

Since the late 1960s tens of thousands of MLNV activists have been detained, and several thousands of those imprisoned. Up until 2003 an estimated 30,000 activists had been arrested, 8,172 of whom were accused of being members of ETA, out of which 4,770 were convicted of a criminal offence and served a prison sentence. A notable convicted MLNV leader is former ETA-member Arnaldo Otegi, who was released in 2016 after six years in prison for attempting to re-establish the outlawed party Batasuna, despite having received conviction in an unfair trial. In addition, Otegi had been previously convicted of a number of offences including kidnapping, glorifying terrorism, and being an ETA member.

== History ==
The number of prisoners related to the Basque National Liberation Movement has varied over the years as can be seen in the following bar chart. It begins in 1978, after the amnesty of 1977, which made it illegal to bring to trial any Franco era crime, and also gave amnesty to all prisoners who had committed crimes with a political root during Franco's dictatorship and the Spanish transition to democracy.

The data for the bar chart comes from Etxerat, the association of family members of these prisoners, and the EPPK (Euskal Preso Politikoen Kolektiboa). However, some prisoners choose not to be part of Etxerat, or have been expelled, and so the number of Basque National Liberation Movement prisoners is approximately 7% more than these figures. For example, in 2005 Etxerat reported 507 prisoners were held in Spanish prisons, while the Spanish prison service stated that there were 544 related to ETA.

For consistency the Etxerat figures have been used in the bar chart.

== Current situation ==
According to Etxerat, as of February 2026 there were 70 people imprisoned due their activities in support of ETA or organizations linked to ETA. 69 were imprisoned in Spain and 1 in France. 12 were women. 33 additional people are under house arrest.

== Dispersal policy ==
French, Spanish and Swiss prisons currently (red) and previously (green) holding MNLV members.
Spanish and Portuguese prisons currently (red) and previously (green) holding MNLV members.

In 1989 the Spanish government began a policy of dispersal of Basque prisoners throughout Spain. This continued for 34 years until it was ended in 2023. The purpose of this policy was to restrict communication between ETA and its prisoners and to eventually reintegrate them into society. At the beginning some prisoners were even sent to North Africa and the Canary Islands, but during ETA's ceasefire in the late 1990s those prisoners were brought back to the mainland, and even after the ceasefire ended they were kept there. Several times prisoners were brought nearer to the Basque Country as a response to an ETA ceasefire. For example, in September 1999, 105 prisoners were sent to prisons nearer the Basque Country in response to ETA maintaining its ceasefire for over a year. However, prisoners were also sent further away in response to ETA violence.

The policy generally sent more dangerous or high ranking individuals to prisons furthest from the Basque Country. This policy has been seen as a great success by the Spanish government, especially in the light of the 2011 declaration by ETA of a permanent ceasefire. France took a similar approach, spreading their prisoners throughout the French prison system.

The families of the prisoners viewed this policy as punishing them, as they were forced to travel large distances to visit their imprisoned relatives. They argued that the distances they need to travel caused stress, was financially draining, and that every year there were accidents involving family members while traveling to or from prisons. There were many demonstrations calling for all these prisoners to be moved to prisons in the Basque Country. A highly publicised campaign called for this. Its slogan was "Euskal presoak- Euskal Herrira" ("Basque prisoners to the Basque Country"). It had widespread support within the Basque Country. Ill prisoners also regularly asked to be transferred to prisons in the Basque country.

Most of the main political parties in Spain rejected this idea, the exception being Podemos which wanted to see an end to the dispersal policy. Mariano Rajoy, the Prime Minister of Spain, said in 2011 that he would not consider ending the policy until ETA declares its disbandment. Interior minister Jorge Fernández Díaz confirmed the possibility of changing the dispersal policy was conditional on ETA's dissolution. In 2017 this was re-emphasized by the Interior minister Juan Ignacio Zoido who stated that the Spanish government would not end dispersion while ETA still exists. By contrast, the European Parliament condemned on 5 October 2017 dispersal policies applied within Europe for their damaging effect on prisoners' family life, as well as urging member states to revise the sentences of seriously ill prisoners on humanitarian grounds; the act, passed by a large majority (474 votes), was opposed by the Spanish Conservatives, Ciudadanos, and UPyD.

However, in May 2019, the European Tribunal for Human Rights ruled against the appeal filed in 2016 by prisoner Gorka Fraile against his dispersal 700 km away from his family while undergoing cancer treatment; the tribunal stated that the dispersal policy is justified and sanctioned by Spanish law and interference with his family life would be justified by a higher end, i.e. "the prevention of disorder and crime and the protection of the rights and liberties of others", concluding that Spanish Justice did not breach his fundamental rights. In March 2018, Etxerat reported the death of prisoner Xabier Rey in a Cadiz prison cell, 1050 km away from home, who was being held in incommunicado detention. The relatives' support association condemned the harsh conditions of his detention. It was followed by a rally in Pamplona mourning and denouncing his death attended by thousands.

Following ETA's disbandment, in 2017, a wide number of legal experts consulted in Spain advocated for an end to the dispersal policy. However, at that point, the Spanish government refused to change its policy on the matter. The same month that year, UPN, a regional party of Navarre, warned it would not endorse the Spanish government's national budget if it did not strongly commit to the dispersal policies of Basque prisoners. The topic of ETA prisoners was raised by Pablo Casado before and after his election in July 2018 as head of the Popular Party. The party used the victims of terrorism as a way of opposing the incoming Spanish premier Pedro Sanchez, PSOE, now in office, with Casado declaring they would "not put up with any prison transfer closer to home for any ETA prisoners", and would not accept "meddling with the memory of the victims". The party secretary Javier Maroto stated that the party would rally ETA victims onto the streets to protest against any attempt to transfer these prisoners close to the Basque Country.

== EPPK ==
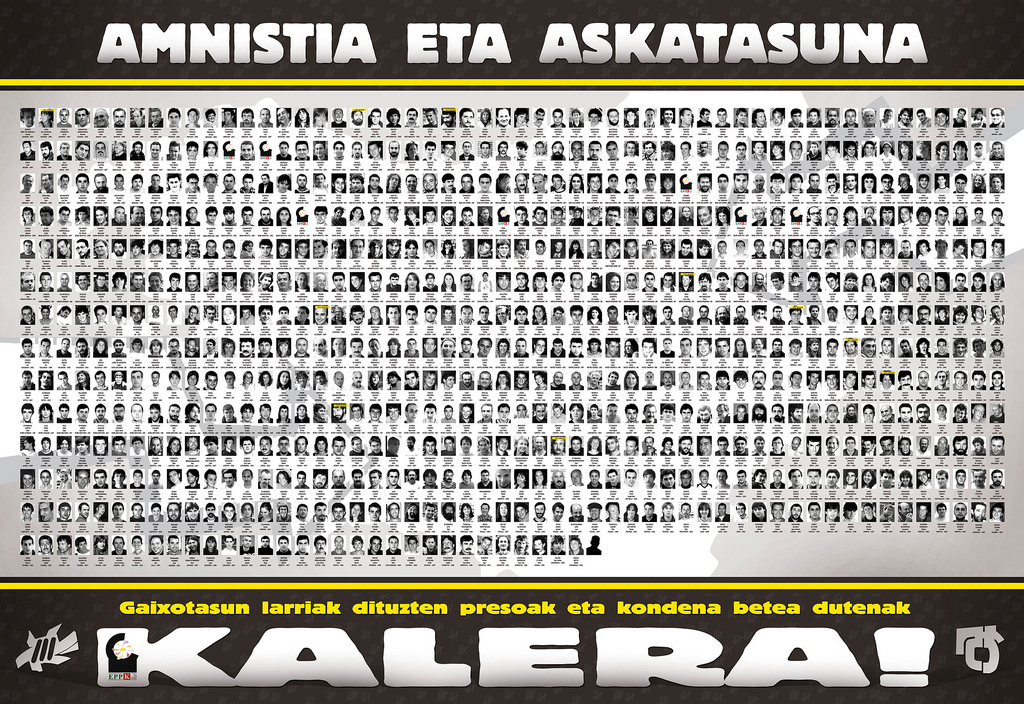
2008 poster with all the prisoners' pictures demanding the release of "prisoners seriously ill and those with prison term completed"

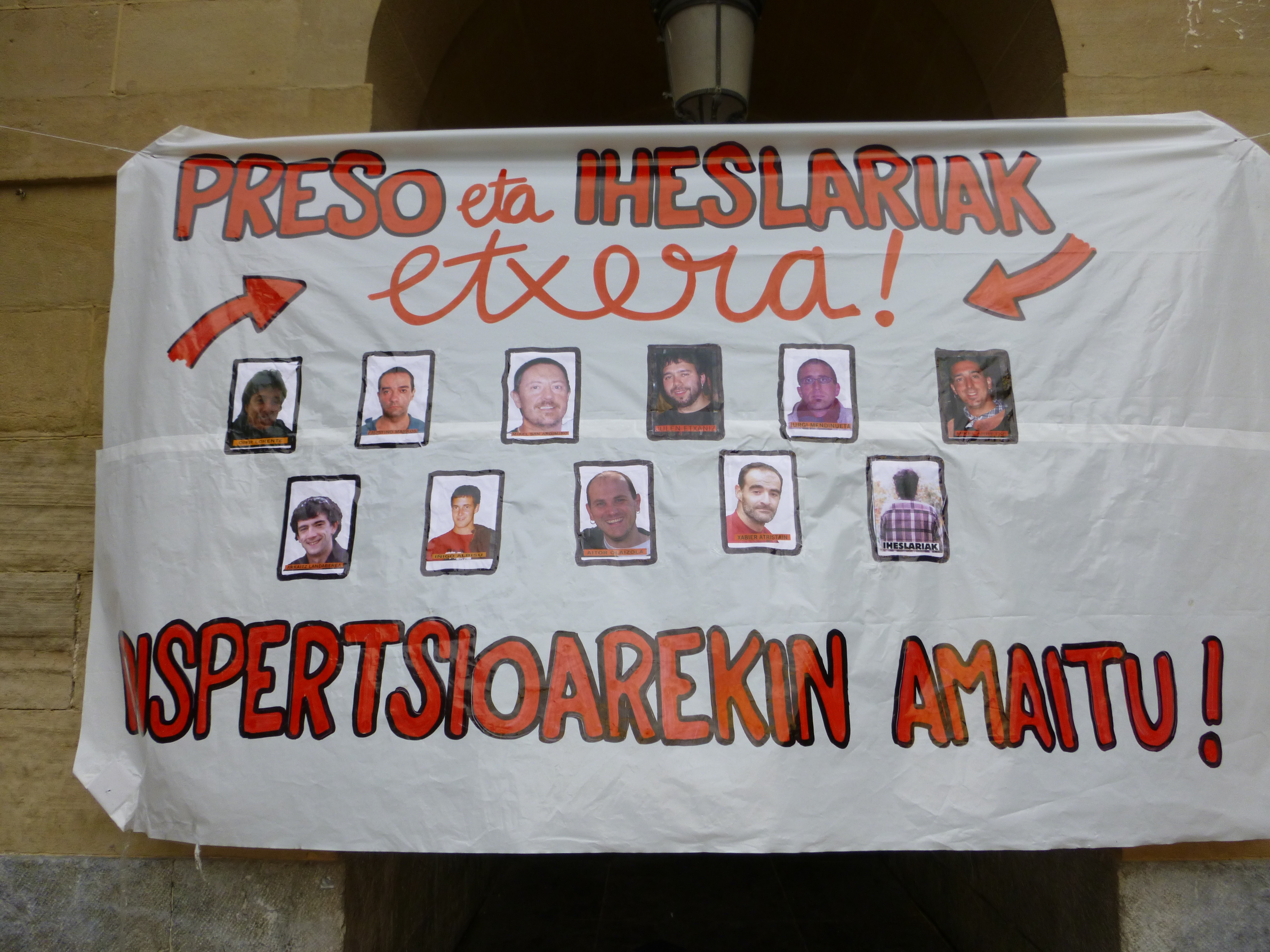
Placard in support of the Basque prisoners (San Sebastián)

Euskal Preso Politikoen Kolektiboa (EPPK) is a collective which speaks and negotiates for, and has as members the majority of these prisoners.

Originally this role was played by La Comisión Pro Amnistía and La Gestora Pro Amnistía, both of which were dissolved after the general amnesty in 1978. In 1979 Gestoras pro Amnistía was created to take their place. After this was made illegal in 2001 Askatasuna took on the role, but was itself made illegal in 2002. In 2008 twenty-one members who had run Gestoras pro Amnistía were imprisoned for between 8 and 10 years each. In 2011 the former head of Askatasuna, Oihana Agirre was given a 12-year sentence.

Since the illegalization of Askatasuna the EPPK and Etxerat have spoken for the prisoners and campaigned for amnesty to be granted to them. The EPPK is said to control prisoners strictly and demand they follow its orders. Prisoners who refuse orders from the EPPK have been ostracized.

It is thought there are broadly 2 groups within the prisoner population. One group has long sentences yet to serve, who would prefer a group negotiation for amnesty. The other group consists of prisoners with less time to serve before being released, and they might be interested in applying for better conditions or for limited release.

In 2012 the EPPK was criticized by former prisoners for insisting on amnesty for all prisoners and denying many prisoners the option of improving their own situation through other legal means. In December 2013 the EPPK announced that it was dropping its long standing demand for amnesty of all prisoners, and so opened the door for prisoners to negotiate individually for better conditions.

However, in July 2014 it was reported that no member of the EPPK had begun individual negotiations, and it was believed that the EPPK was still following an alternative strategy.

== Hunger strikes ==
There have been many hunger strikes by Basque prisoners. None have led to the death of a prisoner.

Here is a list of some of them:

- In June 1974 thirteen prisoners in Basauri prison began a hunger strike. It lasted 13 days.
- In September 1974 one prisoner in Zaragoza prison took part in a 16-day hunger strike and was hospitalized.
- In October 1974 thirteen prisoners in Basauri prison began another hunger strike.
- In December 1974 six prisoners took part in a hunger strike in Zaragoza prison.
- In September 1976 twelve prisoners began a hunger strike in Burgos prison to protest at the conditions of the prison and their treatment.
- In December 1976 eleven prisoners began another hunger strike in Burgos prison.
- In August 1977 seven prisoners from Carabanchel and Martutene prisons took part in a hunger strike.
- In May 1978 nine prisoners held in Pamplona prison held a 17-day hunger strike. It was to support the Pro-Amnesty week, and demand a general amnesty.
- In October 1980, 43 prisoners took part in a hunger strike to complain about harsh treatment in the prisons of Soria and Zamora.
- In February 1981, 108 prisoners in Carabanchel prison began a hunger strike in protest at the torturing to death of fellow inmate Joxe Arregi.
- In September 1982, 74 prisoners in Puerto Santa Maria prison began a hunger strike.
- In February 1984, two prisoners in Fresnes prison, in France held a month-long hunger strike.
- In June 1986 almost 100 prisoners held in Herrera de la Mancha prison took part in a hunger strike to demand amnesty.
- In November 1987 over 100 prisoners from six prisons declared a hunger strike to protest "against the repression of the Basque people, and for political negotiations".
- In December 1988 three prisoners in French prisons took part in a month-long hunger strike, and were hospitalized.
- In April 1991 seventy prisoners in Herrera de la Mancha prison began a hunger strike to complain about being separated from each other within the prison.
- In June 1991, thirteen prisoners in El Salto del Negro Prison, in the Canary Islands began a hunger strike in protest at the "minimal living conditions" in the prison.
- In May 1992, twelve prisoners in El Salto del Negro Prison, in the Canary Islands, held a month-long hunger strike.
- In July 1992, nine prisoners in Puerto 2 prison, held a hunger strike to complain about conditions in the prison.
- In September 1994, 250 prisoners began a hunger strike.
- In July 1996 Iñaki Olaskoaga Múgica, imprisoned in Uzerche prison in France, undertook a hunger strike to demand that Basque prisoners be imprisoned together in a Basque prison. After 23 days he was transferred to hospital.
- In October 1998 four prisoners in La Sante prison in Paris went on hunger strike to protest against the planned extradition of one of them to Spain after completing his sentence in France.
- In May 2000, 300 prisoners ended a 7-month-long hunger strike.
- In August 2006 José Ignacio de Juana Chaos began his first hunger strike which lasted 63 days. It was to protest against him being accused of making terrorist threats in two letters written from prison just as he was about to be released after 17 years inside. In November of the same year he was given a 12½ year sentence for writing those letters. In protest at the sentence he began another hunger strike which ended on 1 March 2007 after 114 days. He began his third hunger strike in July 2008 in protest at the Spanish authorities confiscating the apartment his wife had bought from his mother, and where he was planning to live on leaving prison.
- In January 2010 Lorentxa Gimon began a hunger strike to protest against her isolation in the French prison where she was. It began before and independently of the mass hunger strike which began later in January.
- In January 2010 there was a mass hunger strike by all 742 prisoners belonging to the collective of Basque prisoners (EPPK). It was to complain about the policy of dispersion.
- In October 2010 six prisoners began a 15-day hunger strike in Murcia prison to demand that they all be kept in the same part of the prison, and to complain at the unhygienic conditions of the whole prison, including a plague of rats in the kitchen and dining room.
- In February 2012 Ibon Goieaskoetxea and Borja Gutiérrez began a hunger strike in protest of the imminent transfer of Goieaskoetxea to another prison in France.
- In August 2012 a hunger strike was begun to protest at the Spanish authorities refusal to let Josu Uribetxeberria, an imprisoned ETA member who had terminal cancer, from returning home to die. It began with 100 prisoners in Spain, including Arnaldo Otegi, and they were joined by 91 from French prisons. By 13 August 254 prisoners had joined the hunger strike.
- In October 2013 fifteen Basque prisoners in Seville prison began a hunger strike to protest against their incarceration so far from home and their families. Thirteen of the prisoners continued the hunger strike for 32 days.
- In June 2015 seven prisoners held in Fleury-Mérogis Prison went on hunger strike to protest at the reduction in the number of visits they can each receive, from four every month to two.
- In May 2016 a hunger strike was held for 19 days by several prisoners in Fresnes prison in France in protest at Itziar Moreno being placed in isolation.

== 'Via Nanclares' ==
'Via Nanclares' is a project to allow ETA prisoners to gain better conditions in prison and eventually to be released on condition they fulfill certain conditions. The core of these conditions is that they distance themselves from ETA, ask for forgiveness, and agree to pay compensation for their actions. Its purpose is to break the control the EPPK (Euskal Preso Politikoen Kolektiboa) has over these prisoners and the strict discipline it imposes. Part of this discipline for example, demanded that amnesty of all prisoners was to be sought, and that individuals could not seek ways to reduce their own sentences. Anyone doing so would be ostracized. The 'Via Nanclares' project was thought up by Alfredo Pérez Rubalcaba and set in motion by the then Prime Minister José Luis Zapatero in 2009. It takes its name from the old Nanclares de Oca prison in the Basque Country, where these prisoners were to be sent. In 2011 that prison was replaced by the new 720 cell Zaballa prison, built close to it.

With the change of government in Madrid in November 2011 the 'Via Nanclares' was temporarily closed, but is now in use again. It requires prisoners to:

- Distance themselves from ETA.
- Accept prison policy.
- Leave the collective of Basque prisoners (EPPK).
- Publicly denounce ETA and the use of violence.
- Ask for forgiveness from the families of their victims, if there are any.
- Agree to pay compensation, if damage has been caused.
- And lastly to collaborate with the Spanish judicial system in the fight against terrorism.

When ETA declared its permanent ceasefire in 2011 twenty two prisoners had opted for this option. However, Mikel Buesa claimed that 68 prisoners had started the 'Via Nanclares' by 2012, with 30 managing to be sent to Nanclares prison. The first to be released through the 'Via Nanclares' were José Manuel Fernández Pérez de Nanclares and Fernando de Luis Astarloa in 2012. Prisoners who have chosen this way to improve their conditions have all found themselves ostracized by the radical nationalist community they were formally part of. Many prisoners have been reluctant to pursue the 'Via Nanclares' for this reason.

The 'Via Nanclares' was closed at the end of 2011 when the Partido Popular won the general election. The new government initiated a different project to rehabilitate prisoners, but only one person used it.

In 2014 Spanish judges opened up the way for prisoners, who had been on the 'Via Nanclares' when the project was stopped, to continue the process. So far 3 have been given permission to leave prison during daytime, and a further 8 have been given permission to spend 18 days away from the prison in every 6-month period.

== The Parot doctrine ==
In October 2013 the European Court of Human Rights (ECtHR) condemned Spain over its continued detention of Inés del Rio. She was due to be released in 2008 for good behaviour after 21 years in prison, but in 2006 Spain changed its rules to include what is now known as the Parot doctrine, and decided to postpone her release until 2017. The ECtHR declared that this was a violation of two articles (5 and 7) of the European Convention on Human Rights and ordered Spain to release her as soon as possible and to pay her compensation. The following day, on 21 October 2013, she was released from prison. The European court's ruling also banned the Spanish government from extending prison terms for Basque prisoners.

The Spanish government complained that this ruling would mean they would have to release dozens of ETA prisoners. In November 2013 Spain began releasing other prisoners, including one being held temporarily in a prison in the UK. Ahead of the European Court of Human Rights' ruling, the minister of interior Fernandez Díaz declared that its implementation to the inmates in similar circumstances may be skipped by means of "juridical engineering". The minister of justice Alberto Ruiz-Gallardón stated that "each inmate of Spain in similar circumstances will have to appeal to the European Cour if they want to have the Parot doctrine cancelled". There was a mass demonstration held in Madrid against the ruling by the ECtHR organised by the Association of Victims of Terrorism.

== Torture ==
Generally speaking, torture almost always takes place in secret and so it is difficult to know if it has taken place or not. Members of the Spanish state apparatus have been convicted for mistreatment, torture and even murder of ETA members, the veracity of many torture allegations and the degree to which it occurs is subject to controversy in Spain. However, Amnesty International claims that torture is a reality in Spain; between 2004 and 2012 over 6,400 torture cases were reported, a figure in contrast to the number of convictions. Pau Pérez-Sales, activist and senior expert assisting both domestic and international tribunals has stressed the degree of impunity surrounding torture in Spain. On 13 September 2017, Amnesty International stated that during a long period, citing a Basque Government's 1978-1999 report, torture was applied extensively in Spain under anti-terrorist provisions, affecting to a large extent the Basque Country, and demanded that the Spanish government admit to its practice, as well as reminding it of its 'obligation' to investigate torture and make reparations to the victims. It also denounced Spain for continuing to evade the application of international standards against torture in its domestic legislation. In addition, it stated that convictions for torture are very infrequent, and highlighted the high number of pardons granted to the few people convicted of such crimes. The NGO also pointed out that torture victims are 'ostracized'.

Between 1977 and 2002 there were approximately 5300 claims of torture having been carried out by police on ETA prisoners. Since then there have been hundreds more accusations. Allegations of torture are mostly related to threats and beatings, and then to lesser degrees to suffocation, forced body positions, undressing and physical exercises. A study of 112 Basques held incommunicado between 2000 and 2005, conducted by the Basque Institute for Legal Medicine and based on testimonies collected by an NGO, suggests that torture remains a serious problem in Spain. It detected different alleged torture patterns relating to different police forces. The group arrested by the Civil Guard accused this body of the most severe torture methods. In December 2018, the Spanish Parliament refused reparation and recognition to the victims of torture inflicted in the fight against ETA, or removing honour awards granted to members of the security forces convicted of torture; the proposal was turned down with the votes of the parties PSOE, Ciudadanos and PP.

According to former ETA members, the French police never submitted their prisoners to torture. ETA terrorism never targeted French civilians nor security forces and France had a long-standing policy of tolerating ETA presence on its territory since the times of Franco's dictatorship. This policy changed in the late 80s when French President Mitterrand decided that France would no longer be an ETA 'safe-haven' and began co-operation with Spanish authorities and extradition of ETA-members indicted for terrorism to Spain.

=== Torture cases and convictions ===
One example of an alleged incident is that of Martxelo Otamendi, the editor of a Basque language newspaper Egunkaria which was subject to a precautionary closure in 2004 by a Spanish judge due to alleged links with ETA, later found to be ungrounded. Otamendi, among other editors was arrested by the Guardia Civil as a result of the Court order and claims to have been stripped naked, blindfolded, touched with unidentified objects around his genitals and subject to sleep deprivation and simulated execution. Six colleagues who were detained at the same time also claimed to have experienced similar treatment. They were eventually absolved by the Spanish Audiencia Nacional (High Court) in 2010, which also criticized the Judge's decision to close the only newspaper at the time which was fully in the Basque language without more solid constitutional grounds. The Popular Party's government sued Otamendi for defamation but was eventually ordered by the European Court of Human Rights to pay Otamendi compensation for not taking his allegations seriously nor investigating them.

Another case is that of Fernando Elejalde Tapia, arrested minutes after murdering Francisco Javier Gomez Alósegui at the door of his house; Gomez Alósegui was the psychologist of Martutene prison and a public supporter of negotiation with ETA and bringing convicts to jails close to the Basque Country. Amnesty International reported concern about Elejalde Tapia as a suspected case of torture. After being arrested he was transferred to hospital with "a fractured ear drum, four broken vertebrae in his back, bruising all over his body, blackened eyes, a kidney malfunction and was in a state of semi-consciousness." Ms Leire Gallastegui claimed in 2001 to have been told to choose between "electrodes, her mother's arrest or a broom handle". In December 2010 four Civil Guard police officers were imprisoned for torturing two men suspected of terrorist activities. The police officers were released in 2011 after appealing to the Spanish High Court, which judged the injuries sustained by the suspects to have been caused by a violent arrest.

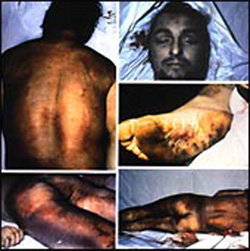
Joxe Arregi dead with bruises and burnings all over his body after 9 days detained incommunicado in Madrid

On the 13 of February 1981 Joxe Arregi, an alleged member of ETA, died of pneumonia in the hospital of Carabanchel prison after spending 9 days in police custody. The forensic report concluded that he was tortured; he showed second degree burns on the soles of his feet, as well as blows and traumas over his body. Two policemen involved in the interrogation were eventually given sentences of 3 months in prison and a two-year suspension for torturing the detainee. No judgment was made in court as to whether Arregi had died as a result of the torture he received because neither the prosecutor nor the Human Rights Organization party to the case asked the judge to do so. However, a first sentence establishing no connection between torture and death was later overturned on the grounds of the contradictions found on the judge's conclusion. It was reported in the Spanish press that Arregi may have died as a result of being submitted to a torture technique called la bañera in which the victim's head is placed in a container of dirty water until he or she is obliged to breathe in the liquid which then enters the victims lungs. Santiago Brouard, doctor and member of the political party HASI at the time, speculated that it may account for Arregi's broncopneumonia.

In September 2014, a Basque report commissioned by the human rights society Argituz and based on the Istanbul Protocol confirmed the veracity of the 45 torture testimonies analyzed spanning from 1982 to 2010 for detainees held incommunicado under the Antiterrorist Law. The report carried out by over 30 health professionals, especially psychotherapists and psychiatric doctors, hailing from 8 different organizations have stressed the difficulties found to obtain any records due to the incommunicado regime that "facilitates the commission of torture and mistreatment", as well as pointing to an ever-increasing use of psychological torture techniques."

An expert panel appointed by Mariano Rajoy's cabinet to evaluate the provisions in place for the prevention of torture underscored that "mistreatment cases are not exceptional, but symptoms of structural deficiencies", recommending as well to install CCTV cameras in all areas of the police stations. Unai Romano's is another case that may have been prevented with the use of CCTV. The Basque youth was arrested and transferred to Madrid in 2001, receiving severe injuries to his head while in custody; as stated by Romano, "on arrival in Madrid I was put in a cell, I was instructed not look at their eyes, then interrogations began. When my answer did not suit them, I got beaten on my head." He was taken to hospital, with Romano filing a report, but his claims went unheard, dismissed by the relevant Spanish tribunal. He then took the case to the European Court of Human Rights, where the case was being considered in early 2015. The images of Romano's swollen and deformed head were leaked, and showed on posters protesting against torture across the Basque Country.

In February 2018, in the midst of a political controversy, with the Basque Nationalist Party MP Aitor Esteban urging the Spanish government to condemn Civil Guard head Manuel Sanchez Corbí for targeting his party in the fight against ETA, labelled as 'the evil', Esteban disclosed that the law-enforcement official was condemned in 1997 for torture against a Basque, and pardoned subsequently by the Spanish government.

=== International criticism ===
Since 2002 Spain has been criticised several times by United Nations Committee against Torture (CAT) and the European Court of Human Rights (ECtHR) for not investigating properly allegations of torture made by ETA members and others suspected of having links to it. Specifically Spain has been found to have violated articles 2, 4 and 14 of the Convention against Torture and Other Cruel, Inhuman or Degrading Treatment or Punishment, and article 3 of the European Convention on Human Rights. France was also criticised by CAT for having deported ETA member Josu Arkauz Arana to Spain in 1997 where he was "in a situation where he was particularly vulnerable to possible abuse". France was found to have violated article 3 of the Convention against Torture and Other Cruel, Inhuman or Degrading Treatment or Punishment in that case. CAT investigated the case of Kepa Urra in 2002, who claimed to have been tortured by 4 members of the Guardia Civil in 1997 during an operation to dismantle part of ETA. Although the four guardia were initially convicted in a Spanish court of having tortured Urra they were later pardoned. Spain was found guilty of a violation of articles 2, 4 and 14 of the Convention against Torture and Other Cruel, Inhuman or Degrading Treatment or Punishment. Two years later, in 2004 a United Nations report written by Theo van Boven stated that the fact that detainees are held incommunicado for up to 5 days allows abuses to take place, and advised the Spanish government to make changes to this practice. In 2012, the UN Committee Against Torture ruled against Spain again, this time for not investigating accusations of torture made by Oskar Gallastegi, who had been sentenced to 26 years in jail for his role in the murder of a judge in the Basque Country in 2001.

Testimony of torture by Ion Arretxe, cross-referencing the case Mikel Zabalza (English subtitles)

Amnesty International has also condemned Spain for holding prisoners incommunicado. A report published in 1999 stated that it "believes it to be beyond question that incommunicado detention facilitates torture and ill-treatment." Again in 2002 Amnesty International released a report criticising the Spanish government for its policy of holding detainees incommunicado. The report states that it had "received some very serious and highly detailed reports, which appear to be corroborated by medical evidence. Many of the allegations referred to the practice of asphyxiation with plastic bags; repeated kicks and blows of the hand on the head or testicles; forced physical exercises for long periods of time; claims of sexual harassment or abuse; threats of execution, rape, miscarriage or injury to partners and relatives." In June 2014 Amnesty International reported on the 'impunity and denial' of the Spanish authorities regarding torture. The human rights organization stated that it had continued to receive allegations of torture and mistreatment inflicted by state security forces since 1987, the year when Spain ratified the United Nations Convention against Torture. The international organization goes on to say that "the Spanish authorities do not take seriously the gravity of torture as a crime of international law, and meanwhile, the victims of torture remain defenseless." In the same report Amnesty International says that successive Spanish governments "have not established sufficient measures and mechanisms necessary to prevent torture taking place while in the custody of its security forces, e.g. the suspension of the incommunicado regime, which remains in place, or the introduction of CCTV in all the places where detainees are held, nor have they implemented provisions leading to thorough, independent and impartial investigation of torture when it takes place."

In 2010 the ECtHR in Strasbourg made its first ruling against Spain for not investigating properly allegations of torture made by ETA member Mikel San Argimiro. In 2014 the ECtHR criticised Spain again for failing to protect prisoners from violence at the hands of the authorities. This time the cases of Ms Beatriz Etxebarria Caballero, and Mr Oihan Unai Ataun Rojo were examined. It was shown that the Spanish authorities did little to investigate their claims of torture and ordered Spain to pay each compensation. In 2015 the ECtHR found Spain guilty of violating the procedural aspects of article 3 of the European Convention on Human Rights (ECHR) in the case brought against it by Arratibel Garciandia. Most recently, in May 2016, the ECtHR ruled against Spain for not investigating properly allegations of torture made by Xabier Beorlegi. In January 2018, the European Court of Human Rights ruled against Spain for degrading and inhuman treatment inflicted by the Civil Guard to Mattin Sarasola and Igor Portu, two ETA members convicted of the T-4 bombings in Madrid. For the first time the tribunal ruled on content, and not just on form, i.e. Spain not investigating torture, for which Spain has been condemned 9 more times by the same court during the last years. The court thus supports a previous ruling by a Basque court which condemned 4 Civil Guard officers for torture, a sentence that was overturned by the Spanish High Court. It constitutes a violation of Article 3 of the Council of Europe's European Convention on Human Rights.

In May 2019, fifteen independent experts making up the UNO Committee against Torture resolved that Gorka Lupiañez, condemned for ETA membership and other related offences by Spanish tribunals, was subjected to torture by the Civil Guard in 2007 during incommunicado detention, using methods such as bag suffocation, battering, sleep deprivation, and death threats, as denounced by the victim; following Lupiañez's denouncement, the Spanish authorities accused him of "following ETA's agenda". The Committee once more urges Spanish authorities to stop incommunicado detentions for their relation to torture, reminds them that nothing justifies it, as well as demanding that they "pursue diligent, immediate and impartial investigations". Following a long process pursued by Spanish authorities to extradite Iratxe Sorzabal, an ETA member, the Paris Court of Appeal rejected in December 2020 a 4th European Arrest Warrant on the grounds that Spain did not make the efforts necessary to investigate evidence of torture inflicted on her. The tribunal bases its resolution on the report presented by the IRCT, International Rehabilitation Council for Torture Victims, and IFEG on the risks of ignoring torture. In January 2021, the ECtHR condemned again Spain for the passivity shown in conducting proper investigation on serious torture allegations denounced in by Íñigo González, member of the disbanded organization Ekin, following his detention in 2011 by the Civil Guard in Pamplona on orders of the judge Fernando Grande-Marlaska, so breaching the article 3 of the European Convention of Human Rights; a report confirmed he suffered post-traumatic stress syndrome. The Audiencia Nacional demanded to launch an investigation, but the judge did not act accordingly, "for absence of leads"; the Constitutional Court did not endorse González. The tribunals refused to name the Civil Guard officers identified by the detainee, a position the ECtHR criticizes in the sentence. Spain is liable to a €20,000 compensation to González for damages. ECtHR has ruled ten times against Spain for not investigating torture since 2010.

=== Claims of false torture allegations ===
Successive Spanish Governments have consistently stated that, in general terms, torture claims by Basque detainees are part of a tactic by ETA to gain political capital and sympathy as well as to bog down the legal process, rather than a systematic practice of torture by Spanish authorities. As stated by El País, there is no evidence to show that the Spanish security forces have systematically used torture against ETA suspects. According to Secretary General of the Unified Police Syndicate José Manuel Sánchez-Fornet, there exist 'absolutely exceptional cases of mistreatment' with a small number of trials and convictions of members of the Police and Guardia Civil, but he also avows that anti-terrorist legislation 'helps cases of torture' happen. Just the opposite, the Coordinating Committee for the Prevention of Torture has underscored the obstacles set by the successive Spanish governments to carry out proper investigation, failing to meet the most basic requirements expected for investigations on torture allegations, with only two severe cases leading to an effective conviction of police officials, both condemnations warranted by judges in the Basque Country, and not Madrid tribunals.

In 2008 a manual produced by ETA for its members was found by the Guardia Civil in the hands of ETA members Igor Portu and Mattin Sarasola, when they were arrested in the house of a third ETA member Mikel Sebastian. This manual, written entirely in the Basque language and eventually leaked to the press, was named Atxiloketari Aurre Eginez, 2º zkia (Facing Detention, Volume 2). It detailed what ETA members should do once detained by the police. According to the press, the three main directives of this document were firstly, "do not make a statement", secondly, "deny everything", and thirdly, "report torture". Starting with a first hand account of a detention process, the manual highlights the comfort of court jail cells, and says a forensic doctor will visit detainees before they appear before a judge. ETA members are told that once in a court jail they need not worry about threats and blackmails made during their interrogation in the police station because they cannot be returned there. As reported by El País, once in the court jail, the documents directs members to tell the forensic doctor that they have been tortured mentally as well as physically, and to tell that the statements they made in the police station were extracted under torture. Official court papers make no mention of these details.

A similar manual was confiscated from the ETA cell "Commando Araba" in 1998, recommending all ETA detainees to allege torture, reminding them that "standing behind you are the press, local, youth and international collectives and, with a bit of luck, some opportunist and doubtful political party." However, the NGO Torturaren Aurkako Taldea (TAT) has pointed out that this document is totally different in style, tone and language to other 'manuals' found in the possession of the "Commando Araba". TAT has stated that they suspect the document was created by the police.

== Solidarity ==
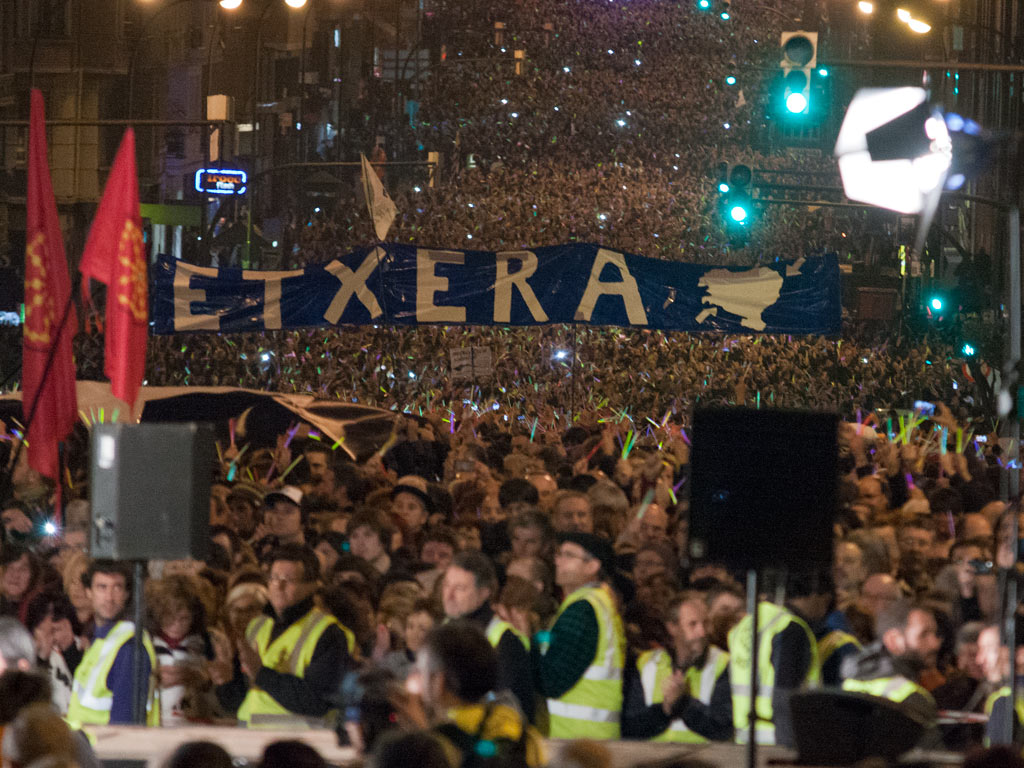
Demonstration in support of the Basque prisoners' rights, Bilbao 2015

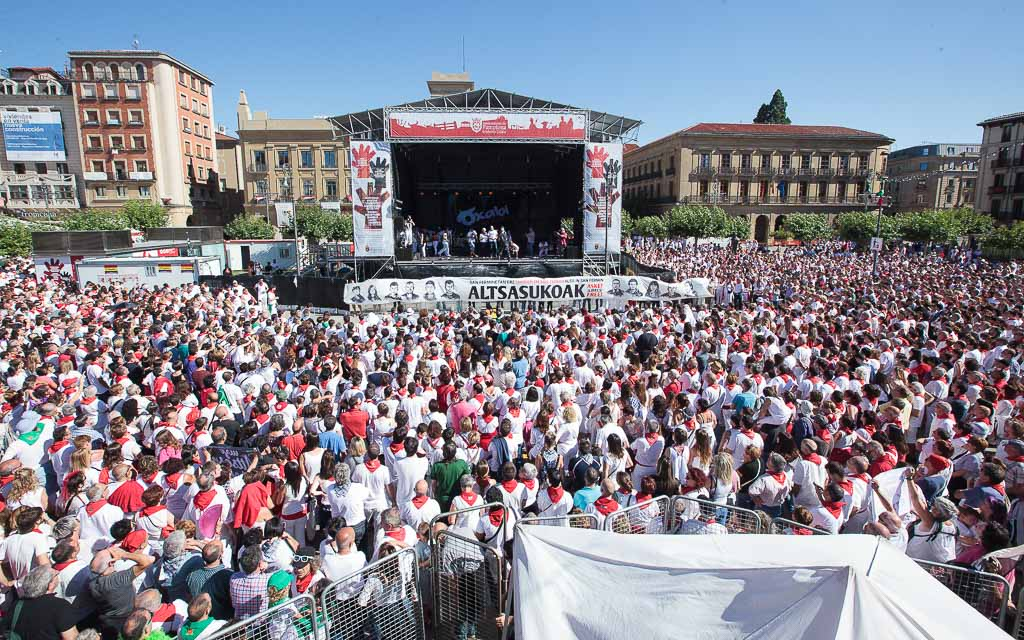
Meeting in support of the accused of Altsasu in San Fermines, Pamplona 2017

The Basque Country has seen many actions and events in solidarity of the Basque prisoners with political motivation. Solidarity has materialized in gatherings, demonstrations, and other events. During the inauguration of the 1999 IAAF World Championships held in Seville two activists disguised as mascots of the games, the Giraldillas, made it onto the stage and remained there during the presentation wearing the logo and slogans for Basque prisoners' repatriation, with another activist showing a placard.

Following the permanent truce by ETA in 2011, the echo of events against the Spanish dispersal policy and in support of the prisoners' rights have gained momentum and a more central position in the Basque political agenda. Sare is a major movement advocating for the rights of Basque prisoners. It calls a mass demonstration each early January in Bilbao with a turnout of tens of thousands. On 9 January 2016, tens of thousands also march in Bilbao, while between 7,500 and 10,000 took to the streets in Bayonne with the same demand.

On 15 January 2017, 80,000 demonstrators according to organizers rallied through the streets of Bilbao to demand an end to the dispersal policies implemented on 350 Basque prisoners scattered all over Spain and France, and the release of seriously ill prisoners. Sare denounced that prisoners are being irregularly retained in captivity beyond the conviction term. On 9 December 2017, thousands arriving from the Basque Country marched through central Paris with demands for an end to the dispersal policy and the special, emergency regime implemented on Basque prisoners. It was supported by the near totality of the French Basque representatives, including Jean-René Etchegaray, mayor of Bayonne and the Basque agglomeration. On 13 January 2018, this demonstration took place again under bleak weather conditions with the same demands.

On her address in the Spanish Congress during the votation for the inauguration of the Spanish premier Pedro Sanchez on 3 January 2020, the MP of EH Bildu Mertxe Aizpurua donned a pin for the transfer of the Basque prisoners back to their homeland, demanding also an end to "the revenge and emergency prison policy against the Basque prisoners" amidst an atmosphere of high tension in which she was subject to verbal abuse. The following day, the society Dignidad y Justicia filed a report before the Supreme Court against her for "humiliation of the victims of terrorism" on the grounds that supporting the rapprochement of these prisoners to the Basque Country is "a long-running demand of the ETA terrorists", also stating that ETA's disbanding is 'fake'. A week later, 65,000 thousands turned out to the streets of Bilbao to demand an end to the dispersal policies; a further 10,00 took to the streets of Bayonne the same day.

== Escapes ==
There have been a number of attempts at escaping from custody. Of the 10 successful escapes, 2 have been from hospitals, undertaken during Franco's dictatorial regime and early Transition. The biggest, the Segovia prison break, involved 29 prisoners who dug a tunnel to escape Segovia prison in 1976. A film has been made based on it. The most recent escape was by Ibon Fernández Iradi who managed to flee the police station where he was being held in France in 2002.

== Reintegration into society ==
When prisoners are released they are currently offered help by Harrera Elkartea, an organisation created in 2012, which helps them looking for work, sorting out their finances, paperwork and other issues. Some politicians have called for this organisation to be made illegal.

In its first 2 years Harrera Elkartea has helped 18 ex-prisoners back into work, 45 to get their driving license, and about 40 to get dental treatment and sort out eye problems.

== Publications ==
In 2002 the Ataramiñe cultural association was set up to promote and publish literary work of these prisoners. Each year since then a book has been published compiling shorter works, and many other longer works have also been published.

== Recent developments ==
In December 2013 the EPPK, which is the collective organisation negotiating on behalf of the prisoners, dropped its long standing demand for amnesty for all the prisoners, leaving the way open for individuals to negotiate individually for their release. Also in December 2013, ETA declared that they recognised the "suffering and damage" caused by their actions, and also acknowledged the Spanish legal system. These two declarations were key demands from Madrid before any talks could start over the conditions of the prisoners. In May 2014 the Minister of the Interior, Jorge Fernández Díaz said that the government would not consider the ending of the policy of dispersion unless ETA disbanded completely, or until the individual prisoners ask for forgiveness. In July 2014 France agreed for the first time to transfer 2 prisoners to a prison near the Basque Country. The Spanish government agreed in October 2014 to let members of ETA with Spanish nationality who are imprisoned in France, be transferred to prisons in Spain.

In August 2017, the minister of interior Juan Ignacio Zoido declared he would not undertake any measures in order to change the prison policy until ETA disbands. In April 2018, ETA announced its dissolution, a move staged in an international conference held in Cambo (Kanbo), French Basque Country. All the same, UPN, a strategic ally of PP in Navarre, overtly refused to support Rajoy's national budget for 2018 with its two MPs if the prime minister allowed a transfer of Basque prisoners to internment centres closer to the Basque Country, a political stance echoing the staunch opposition showed by Ciudadanos to "a negotiation by Rajoy's cabinet of privileges with Basque nationalists", including measures to bring ETA prisoners closer home.

On 11 January 2020, the judge of the National Court of Spain José Luis Calama ordered the police a close scrutiny of the demonstration against the dispersal policy taking place in Bilbao to watch out for possible "humiliation of the victims" or "praise or justification of terrorism". On the same grounds, the party Vox demanded a ban to the demonstration, while the party PP labelled the demonstration as 'derisory' to the victims of ETA, and the support of Podemos to the rally as 'appalling', demanding the incoming president of Spain Pedro Sanchez to take sides; on the rally, an ETA victim and a GAL victim urged that they not be used for political purposes. On 8 January, the association of relatives of Basque prisoners Etxerat denounced on a press release that 19 incurable prisoners and undergoing severe disease were being held imprisoned, demanding the release of those with death prognosis and risk. The association raised the figure of Basque prisoners of political motivation to approximately 250.

On 20 October 2020, the European Court of Human Rights ruled against Spain for not accepting four Basque prisoners' appeal to the Constitutional Court, breaching their right to a fair trial and lack of legal certainty; however, the European Tribunal confirmed its refusal to accept computing time done in France on their prison terms in Spain. In January 2022, the European Tribunal of Humans Rights condemned Spain for lack of access to the lawyer chosen by Javier Atristain, accused of offences related to ETA, and inability to consult legal-aid lawyer during questioning by the police while in incommunicado detention, depriving him of the right to have a fair trial, as stated and confirmed by the European court in May. The European Tribunal's ruling set a precedent that initiated the Atristain doctrine for all like cases. In February, the Civil Guard released a report to the Audiencia Nacional stating that the Spanish General Secretary of Penitentiary Institutions were holding contacts with the support circles of the Basque prisoners, prompting Pablo Casado, PP's opposition leader in Spain, to demand the resignation of the minister of Interior Grande-Marlaska; the association Sare cited in the report denounced threats and insults to his spokesperson Joseba Azkarraga as a result.
