= Jarki (political organisation) =

- Founded: March 17, 2017
- Newspaper: Zuzia
- Ideology: Basque independence, socialism
- Political position: Radical-left
- National affiliation: Jardun Koordinadora

Website
- https://jardunkoordinadora.eus/

Jarki is an independentist and socialist organization from the Basque Country. It was founded on March 18, 2017, with the aim of engaging in ideological struggle. The organization seeks to promote confrontation with Spain by encouraging public mobilization and activism, with the goal of "eroding the state's hegemony." However, Jarki has explicitly rejected the use of street violence and attacks as a means to achieve its goals.

Jarki does not maintain a website, social media presence, or public spokesperson, as it believes that contemporary politics are too closely tied to the media and appearances. Instead, the organization aims to pursue a different way of conducting politics. Despite its low public profile, Jarki publishes a bi-monthly bulletin called Zuzia. The organization operates outside of legal frameworks, as it does not recognize the juridical authority of either Spain or France.

Jarki was one of the founding members of the Jardun Koordinadora and remains its leading organization today.

== Ideology ==
The primary objective of the organization is to establish the conditions necessary to create a "revolutionary alternative" for the Basque Country. Therefore, Jarki aims to mobilize and radicalize Basque society in the long term, with the ultimate goal of developing this revolutionary alternative.

Jarki's main strategic goals include the construction of an independent and socialist state encompassing the seven provinces of the Basque Country; overcoming class conflict in the Basque Country and the socialization of the means of production; eliminating the oppression of female workers; preserving the Basque language and culture; and promoting the re-Basqueization of the region.

The organization presents itself as both independentist and socialist. Jarki has stated that it has no affiliation with the Basque nationalist left or with newer organizations such as AEM or Herritar Batasuna, and it denies being a dissident faction of the Basque nationalist left.

== History ==
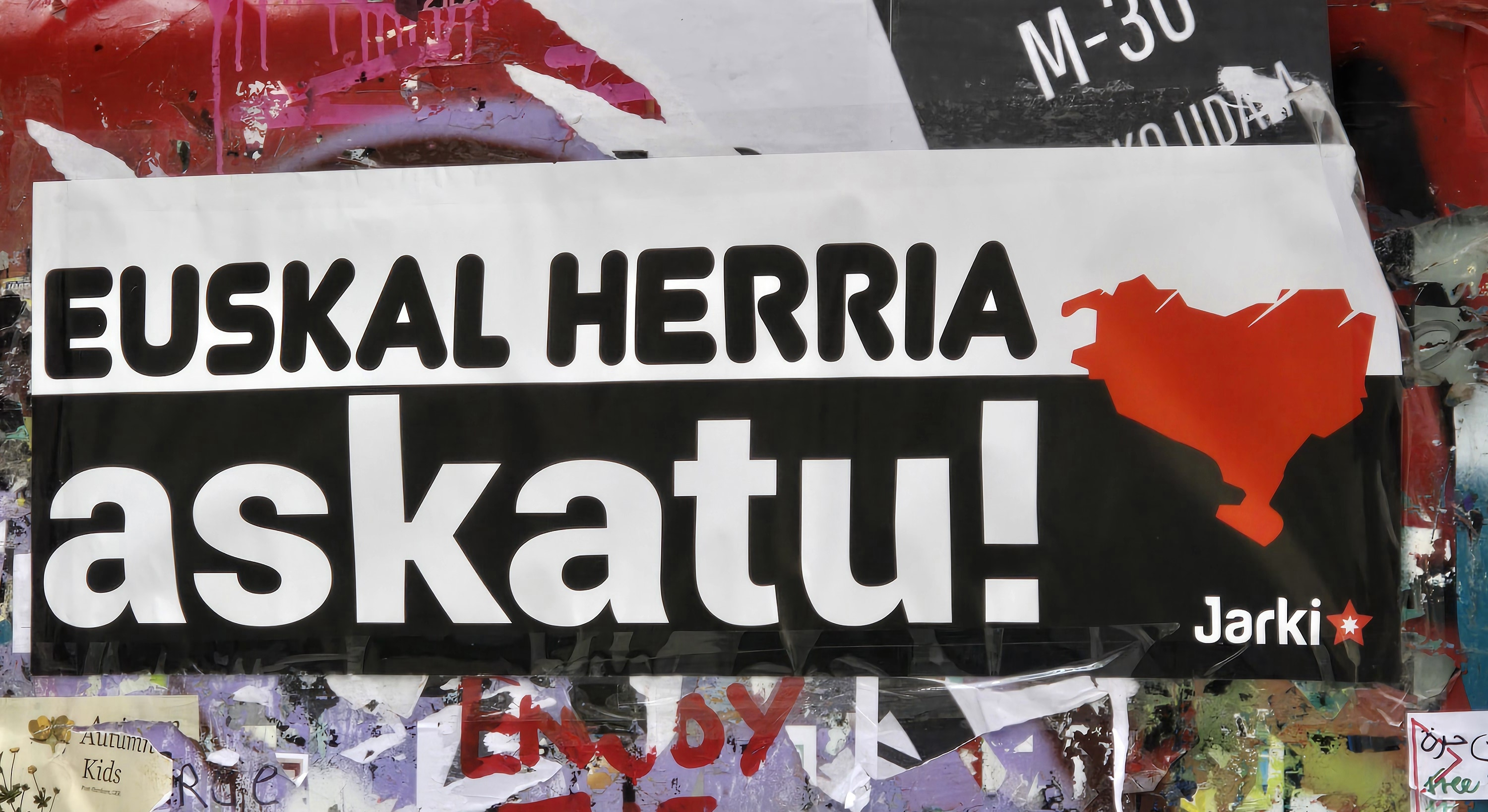
Jarki sticker in Bilbao

Jarki was founded on March 18, 2017, during a meeting of several Basque militants in Arrieta. Initially, the newly established organization had a presence only in Bizkaia and Álava, and it consisted of around 20 members. Therefore, before going public, the organization spent two years organizing, networking, and establishing itself.

Although Jarki's public presentation was originally planned for 2020, it was brought forward to the 2019 Gudari Eguna (Day of the Soldier). In preparation for this, the organization launched a campaign across the Basque Country in August, using posters and banners, and organized an event for Gudari Eguna, which it has continued to do annually since its inception.

In December of the same year, Jarki led a campaign against the Spanish constitution, culminating in a demonstration in Durango on December 6. Jarki organized a second demonstration concerning the situation caused by the COVID-19 pandemic in Gasteiz on July 18 2020.

At the beginning of 2020, Jarki, together with Eusko Ekintza and Bultza Herri Ekimena, agreed on the foundations for the creation of the Jardun Koordinadora. Later, the grassroots movement Askatasun Haizea from Busturialdea also joined the coordination process. The public presentation of the Jardun Koordinadora took place during the Albertia Eguna on August 15 of that same year. However, in February 2021, Eusko Ekintza announced via social media that it would no longer participate in the coordination body.

== See also ==
- Socialist Movement
- Abertzale
