= Etxerat =

Spanish non-governmental organization

- Founded: 1991
- Type: Non-governmental organization
- Purpose: Prisoners and exiles of Basque National Liberation Movement
- Headquarters: Hernani, Gipuzkoa, Spain
- Services: Supporting families of imprisoned and exiled persons
- Method: Legal advocacy, Media attention, direct-appeal campaigns, lobbying
- Key people: Fermina Villanueva, President
- Website: www.etxerat.eus/index.php/eu/

Etxerat (Basque: [e t͡ʃeɾat], meaning 'Homeward') is an association of family members of people who have been imprisoned or exiled because of their activity in support of the Basque National Liberation Movement. Most of those prisoners and exiles were members of Euskadi Ta Askatasuna (ETA), a terrorist organization that was dissolved in 2018, and which sought Basque independence. Others were not members of ETA but have been jailed for collaborating with it, or have been convicted of other crimes such as belonging to illegal organizations like Segi or Gestoras pro Amnistía, belonging to or trying to rebuild banned political parties such as Batasuna and Askatasuna, participating in Kale borroka, or for the "public glorification of terrorism". Etxerat's primary activities are to support those family members and to advocate for relatives who are imprisoned for terrorism-related offenses or who have fled to avoid prosecution.

== History ==
Etxerat, originally called Senideak ('Relatives' in Basque), was created on 6 October 1991. In 1989 the Spanish Government had begun sending Basque prisoners involved in the separatist movement to prisons all over Spain. This 'dispersion of prisoners' caused the family members of those prisoners to feel that they were being punished even though they had done nothing wrong. This led them to form an association to speak on their behalf. In addition to this it has been suggested that an additional motive was that the families of the prisoners were unhappy with the way the organisation Amnistiaren Aldeko Batzordeak, which up until then campaigned on behalf of the prisoners, was undertaking this task.

In December 2001 Senideak changed its name to Etxerat.

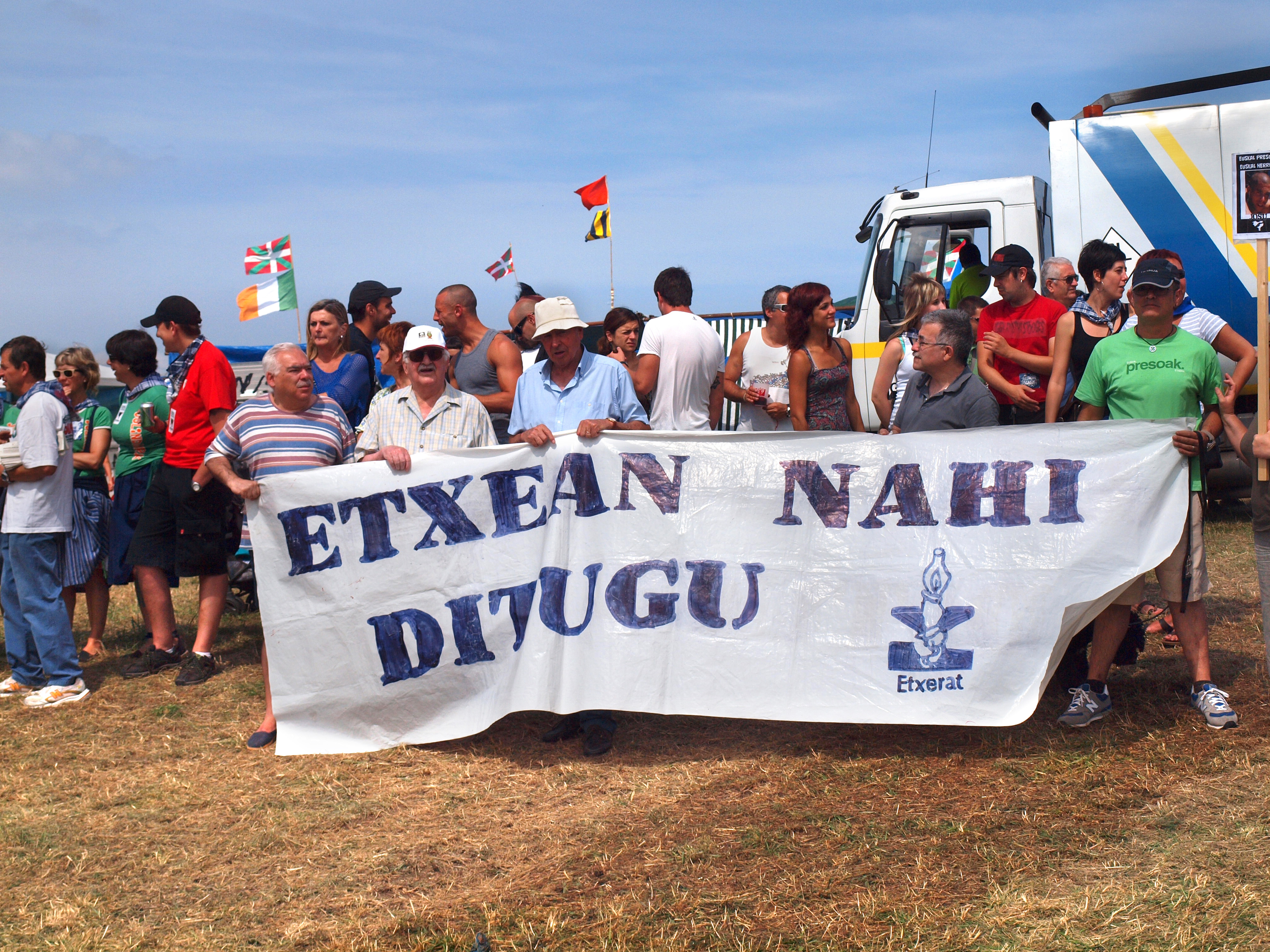
Etxerat supporters with a banner reading "We want them home"

Its current logo is a reversed version of the lamp in Pablo Picasso's painting Guernica.

== Summary of its aims ==
The aims of Etxerat are to assist and support family members of Basque nationalist prisoners and exiles, and to bring to public attention the conditions in which those prisoners and exiles live. Previously their main aim was to end to the policy of dispersion of prisoners used by the French and Spanish Governments, However this aim was achieved in 2023.

== Dispersion of prisoners ==
Etxerat's main campaign was to end the French and Spanish Governments' policies of dispersing people imprisoned due to their activity within the Basque separatist movement to prisons all over France and Spain. This was achieved in 2023.

When this policy was in use Etxerat claimed that it forced the family members of those prisoners to travel huge distances, often hundreds of miles, just to visit their relatives for a couple of hours. Etxerat considered this to be a punishment of those family members and claimed that it infringed upon their human right to maintain frequent contact with their imprisoned family members. The ending of this policy had substantial public support in the Basque Country, and was also supported by Pablo Iglesias, the leader of the main anti-austerity party in Spain, Podemos.

The Spanish Government considered the dispersion of prisoners connected to ETA to be a benefit to them, because being separated from other more radical prisoners would allow any who wanted to leave ETA the opportunity to do so. In 2014 the Prime Minister of Spain, Mariano Rajoy, said that the policy does the prisoners a "big favour" by helping them in the process of reintegration into society.

== Activities ==
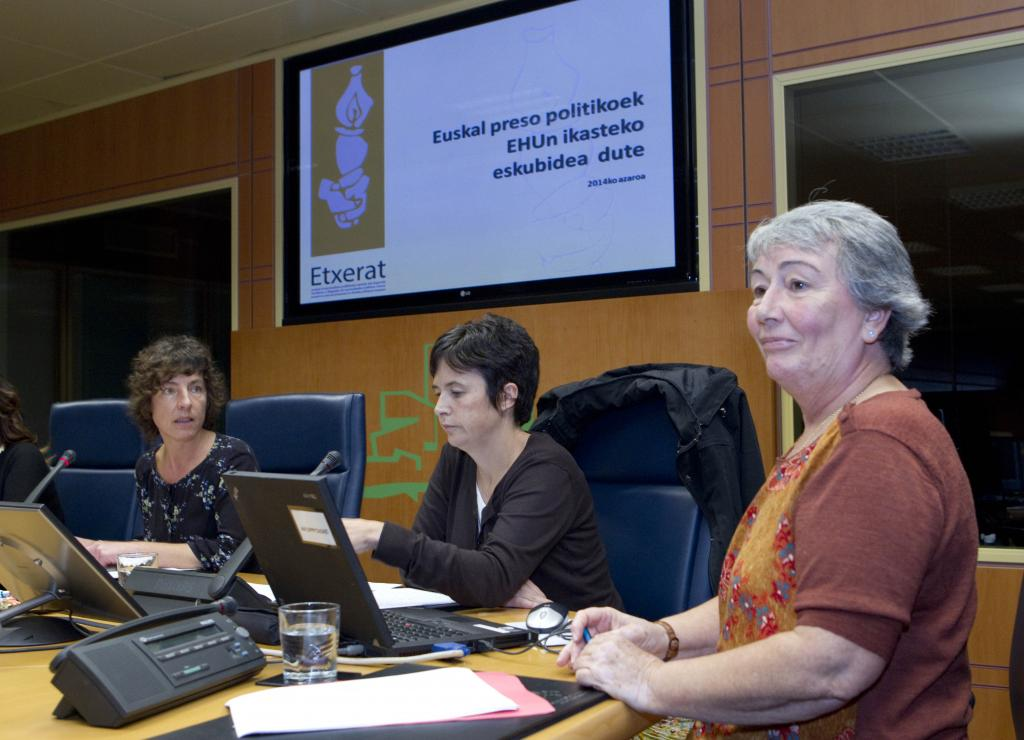
Etxerat spokespersons, Lurdes Rodriguez and Ainhoa Larramendi, appear in the Basque Parliament.

Etxerat undertakes a range of activities supporting these prisoners and their families. They include:

- Lobbying decision makers, such as the Basque Government, Spanish Government and the European Parliament, to take action to safe-guard the rights of the prisoners.
- Publishing a monthly list of the prisoners they support, with details of health problems that any are suffering and reports of any mistreatment that the prisoners or family members have claimed.
- Organising press conferences in order to publicise specific issues relating to the prisoners.
- Undertaking projects to improve the lives of prisoners and their families.
- Organising demonstrations on the streets of Basque cities.
- Previously, when prisoners were dispersed all over Spain, they organised a coach to travel to Andalusia from the Basque Country every Friday so that friends and families of the prisoners jailed there could travel together and save on the cost of travelling.

== Prisoners ==
There are currently over 100 prisoners which Etxerat seeks to support. Most of these were members of ETA when arrested and have been convicted of terrorist activities. Some committed murder during ETA's violent campaign. Others have been jailed because they had links to ETA such as through their membership of banned organizations like Segi or Gestoras pro Amnistía, or banned political parties such as Batasuna and Askatasuna. Still more have been jailed for collaborating with ETA, or participating in Kale borroka, or for the "public glorification of terrorism".

== Fugitives ==
There are currently around 300 individuals with some connection to ETA who are living abroad after fleeing Spain to avoid arrest or prosecution. Some are formally wanted by the Spanish judiciary, while others left because they believe they could face charges in the future. Around 100 are in France, with most of the remaining individuals residing in Mexico and Venezuela.

== Criticism ==
Some politicians have claimed that Etxerat was part of ETA's network, however an attempt to make it illegal in 2009 failed. In 2010 Carlos Urquijo of the Popular Party asked the Basque Government to prevent Etxerat from holding its annual meeting, because he said it was wrong that they should be allowed to criticise prison policy and call their imprisoned relatives "Political prisoners".

== Government support ==
Etxerat, and its predecessor Senideak, have received financial support from the Basque Government since the 1990s. Much of this was to cover the transport costs of family members visiting these prisoners. In 2009 this payment was suspended by the Spanish Government. In addition to these transport costs the Basque Government has given Etxerat grants so that it can undertake projects, such as improving the educational opportunities of the prisoners. These grants are sometimes withdrawn or reduced by the Spanish Government official responsible for oversight of the Basque Country ('Delegado del Gobierno en el País Vasco'). In the most recent case this was because the Spanish Government took the view that it was not the role of the Basque Government to fund education in prisons outside the Basque Country.

== Presidents of Etxerat ==
- Carmen Galdeano Prieto (2001)
- Santos Sagardui.
- Joxepa Arregi (2010).
- Fermina Villanueva (2011).
