= Navarrese nationalism =

Ideology that claims sovereignty for Navarre

Coat of arms of Navarre

Navarrese nationalism is a political and social movement that claims Navarre to be a nation.

== History ==
Navarrese nationalism was born out of independentist approaches to the reality of the region, different from the proposals of traditional Basque nationalist voices. It wants to establish a sovereign state in Navarre, and they see a historical precedent in the medieval Kingdom of Navarre; or at least achieving a higher status for Navarre inside a hypothetically independent Basque Country, as they consider the ancient kingdom to be the founder of current Basque institutions.

Even if it is a minoritary movement, it has trends within it. Some of their members are near the abertzale left, with a similar ideology to that of Basque separatism; others are moderates, who want a more controlled and steady concession of sovereignty to Navarre; and there is also a sector identified with the political right. The conservatives, after the promulgation of the Agreed Law (1841) and the dictatorship of Francisco Franco (1936–1978), are now defenders of foralism, rather than nationalism, existing in the Basque Country a sector close to the ideals of the Basque Nationalist Party.

A 2005 survey found that only 36.8% of Navarrese residents reported a "predominant feeling of Navarrese national identity". In 2019, another survey showed an increase to 52.16% in that same question.
