= Herritar Batasuna =

Basque revolutionary socialist political organisation founded in 2017

Herritar Batasuna Herritar Batasuna
- Abbreviation: HB
- Founded: 28 January 2017
- Ideology: Revolutionary socialism; Basque nationalism; Basque independence; Anti-capitalism
- Political position: Far-left

Website
- herritarbatasuna.eus

Herritar Batasuna (HB; lit. Citizens' Unity) is a Basque revolutionary socialist political organisation launched in Pamplona (Iruñea) on 28 January 2017. It defines its basic pillars as independence, socialism, reunification and re-Euskaldunization (re-Basquization).

HB situates itself within the extra-parliamentary, dissident space of the abertzale left, separate from the coalition EH Bildu.

== History ==
The HB project was launched by thirty activists next to the Monumento a los Fueros in Pamplona on 28 January 2017, framing it as a new organisational space that sought to recover the “revolutionary socialist and abertzale spirit” associated with historic movements while adapting it to the 21st century.

Basque daily Berria described HB's stated aim as building independence and socialism as two sides of the same process, with an anticapitalist, antifascist and anti-imperialist orientation.

== Ideology and organisation ==
HB's own organisational documents emphasise assembly-based decision-making at local, regional and national levels, coordinated by a National Coordinating body between assemblies. The group describes itself as revolutionary-socialist and pro-independence, advocating a strategic line of “independence and socialism”.

In media analyses of the wider abertzale milieu, HB is typically cited among minor dissident groupings (e.g., alongside GKS), whose abstentionist campaigns have not measurably affected EH Bildu's electoral performance. HB itself has issued calls for “active, revolutionary abstention” in election cycles.

== Activities ==
HB operates as an extra-parliamentary movement, publishing statements, holding rallies and interventions. In 2025 the organisation publicised its call to mark Aberri Eguna (Basque National Day) in Orreaga (Roncesvalles).

== Publications ==
HB issues the periodical HAZIA (seed) as a bulletin featuring commentary on labour struggles and movement strategy.

== See also ==
- Abertzale left
- EH Bildu
- Herri Batasuna – the historic far-left coalition (1978–2001) with which the acronym HB is often associated.
