= Gestoras pro Amnistía =

Activist organization

Gestoras pro Amnistía (Amnistiaren aldeko Batzordeak in Basque, and Commission for Amnesty in English) was an organisation formed in 1979 to campaign for the release of ETA prisoners and to support their interests. Its predecessor was La Gestora Pro Amnistía, which was closed in 1977 after its demand for a general amnesty was met.

After Gestoras pro Amnistía was made illegal by Spanish courts in 2001, its role was taken by Askatasuna, which was itself made illegal in 2002. Since then this role has been taken by Senideak, which later changed its name to Etxerat.

In 2008, twenty-one people who had run Gestoras pro Amnistía were jailed for eight to ten years each.
