= Iñaki Kijera Zelarain =

Basque protester (1961–1979)

Iñaki Kijera Zelarain (also spelled Iñaki Kijera Celerain, 30 April 1961 – 1 September 1979) was a Basque protester who died in a demonstration in favor of Basque terrorists. He was 18 when he died and was living with his parents in the Antiguo district.

== Political context ==
He was born on 30 April 1961 in San Sebastián. Four years after the death of the Spanish caudillo Francisco Franco, the Spanish State was still in great turmoil. Repressed groups, ideologies and nationalities saw a chance to express their opinions and wishes. A new Constitution was formed in 1978 which allowed for the possibility of autonomy for Spanish territories, like the Statute of Autonomy of the Basque Country, which was ratified on 25 October 1979.

1979 was a year of unrest. Attacks against Basque political refugees and terrorists in Northern Basque Country (which was under French administration), and French Police Forces' repression made things more difficult for Basque leftist nationalists. Demonstrators used hunger strikes and other protests to denounce the situation, and drew attention to the political status of Basque prisoners and refugees, namely in: Hendaia, Hazparne, Vitoria-Gasteiz, Bilbao, Durango, San Sebastián, and Pamplona.

That same year, France refused to acknowledge Basque refugees as political refugees, arguing that Spain was already a democracy. To protest this refusal, refugees began a hunger strike in several Northern Basque Country provinces, under the slogan "Euskadin bizi nahi dugu", "We want to live in Euskadi". In Southern Basque Country, solidarity was shown in different ways: politicians administrative buildings, citizens went on hunger strikes, and started several demonstrations. Some of these demonstrations would become especially bloody.

== 1 September 1979 demonstration in San Sebastián ==
On 31 August 1979, more than forty politicians of different political parties (HB, EE, LKI, PTE and EMK-OIC) closed themselves up in the Provincial Council of Gipuzkoa in favor of Basque political refugee's rights. The next day, Committees in Favor of Amnesty ("Amnistiaren Aldeko Batzordeak") called for a demonstration to be held on September 1, in the four Southern Basque Country capitals. Joaquin Argote, the Civil Governor of Gipuzkoa, banned San Sebastián's demonstration. Forces of Public Order took control of the city on 1 September, in order to prevent any demonstration attempts.

However, approximately 2000 people showed up and joined with those closed up in the Provincial Councils of Gipuzkoa and San Sebastián (who were tied to each other as a sign of protest). They started a demonstration on the street and the Spanish National Police responded with violence.

== Murder ==
Kijera took part in the demonstration with his friends. When the Spanish National Police scattered the demonstrators, he hid in Old Town. As the police took the street where he was located, he attempted to reach the gardens of Alderdi Eder and was shot by an officer from approximately 10 meters. The bullet hit him in the right side and exited his back. He laid on the pavement for 15 minutes at the rear of the City Council. Others who tried to approach him where stopped by the police who beat and shot rubber bullets at them. A doctor and a nurse from the Red Cross attempted to aid Iñaki. Police initially also hit the Red Cross workers. After some fighting, they were able to put Iñaki in a private car after dodging rubber bullets. The wounded man was transferred to an ambulance and taken to a hospital, where he later died.

There were other injuries in the same demonstration. La Vanguardia newspaper named Jon Artola Lopez, Javier Atorrasagasti and two elected officials of the town of Oiartzun, among the injured.

== Afterwards ==
Next day was trawler race day in San Sebastián, but it was cancelled, and mayor Jose Maria Alkain (PNV) declared the day an official day of mourning.

The following Monday, a general strike in Southern Basque Country paralyzed Gipuzkoa. Gas stations where shut down, and radio stations broadcast classical music all day. In San Sebastián, just a few grocery stores where open, and even those closed at noon. There were no taxis or buses on the streets. Forces of Public Order went from one side of the city to another, and found neighborhood entrances blocked by barricades.

Iñaki Kijera was buried in Polloe cemetery, and funeral rituals were held in Antigua district's "San Sebastian Martir" church. 10,000 people assembled and made way to San Sebastián's downtown area. Once again, the police charged and scattered the demonstrators using violence. Uprisings took place all through the city. As a result, there were more injured and arrested demonstrators.

The general strike continued on Bizkaia, Nafarroa and Álava.

Nine years later, National Police officer Salvador Méndez Villatoro was sentenced to one year in prison for negligence in Kijera's murder. During the trial, Méndez Villatoro claimed he had not known that a live round had been loaded into his rifle alongside rubber bullets.

== See also ==
- Bloody Sunday (1972)
- Euskal Herria
- Grupos Antiterroristas de Liberación
- Spanish transition to democracy
- Statute of Autonomy of the Basque Country
