= Socialist Movement (Basque Country) =

Socialist Movement Mugimendu Sozialista
- Headquarters: Basque Country (Spain and France)
- Newspaper: Diario Socialista
- Ideology: Communism; Marxism

The Socialist Movement (MS) (originally, and in Basque: "Mugimendu Sozialista") or socialist current ("ildo sozialista") is a political and social movement originating from the Basque Country with a communist ideology, formed in the late 2010s. It is composed of different interrelated organizations, each with a defined area of action. Since its creation, mirror organizations have formed in territories in Spain.

== Ideology ==
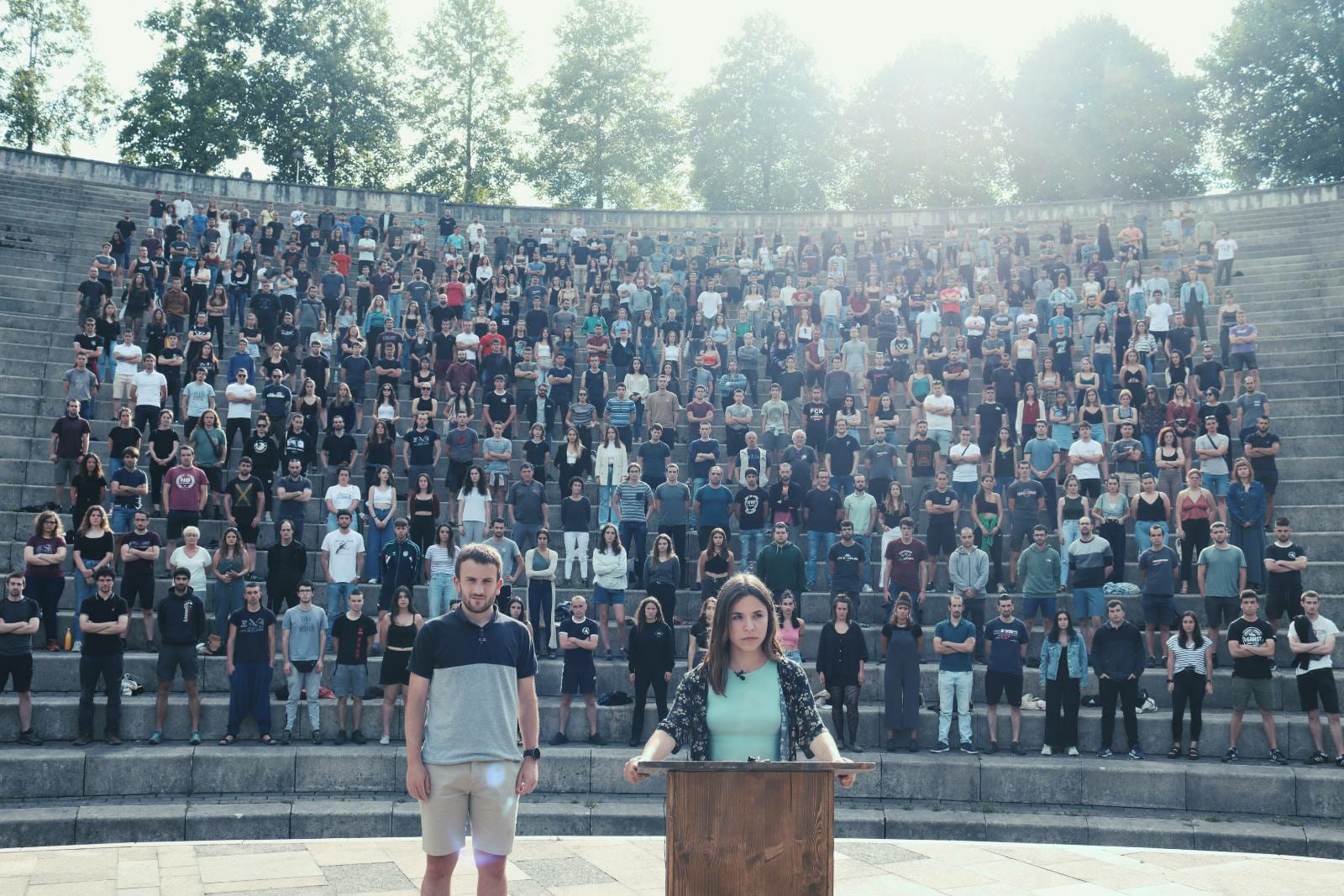
Socialist movement meeting in San Sebastián, 2022

Although it originates from the same sociological space as the Basque National Liberation Movement (MLNV), the Socialist Movement broke from the Abertzale left and its strategy from the beginning, establishing itself as an organized movement independent from it. The Socialist Movement considers the Abertzale left to hold social democratic positions that are incompatible with the socialist revolution and argues that communism has been systematically marginalized within the Abertzale left.

Outside of the Basque Country, other territories in Spain have also joined the Socialist Movement, breaking with previous political experiences, such as in Catalonia and Valencia with Arran and in the rest of Spain with the UJCE. The different organizations that form the movement are united around the ideas of revolutionary Marxism and communism.

== Background ==
=== The end of ETA and the creation of new currents in the abertzale left (2011-2017) ===
After the Declaration of ETA's definitive cessation of armed activity in 2011, various tensions arose within the Abertzale left, leading to the creation of multiple organizations that did not accept the official positions that were established and instead called for a different strategy. Over time, through the exchange of ideas among various activists linked to the student movement and gaztetxes, the foundations of what would later become the socialist current or socialist movement began to take shape.

In this initial process, blogs such as Borroka garaia played a significant role, publishing reflections and texts developed by activists.

=== Split between Ikasle Abertzaleak and Ernai (2018) ===
The student movement played a significant role in the creation of the Socialist Movement, as it was within Ikasle Abertzaleak—the student union of the Abertzale left since 1988—where the two main currents of the Abertzale left clashed in a struggle for leadership of the organization. The disagreements were so profound that in October 2018, the historical alliance between the student organization and the youth wing of the Abertzale left, which at the time was Ernai, was broken. This was due to the belief that "the vision and political practice of both organizations have completely diverged."

This event confirmed the split between the Basque National Liberation Movement (MLNV) and Ikasle Abertzaleak, which in its VII Congress (2019) declared its goal of building a "Basque socialist state." Ernai, on the other hand, launched Ikama, a new student organization that continues to operate within the MLNV.

== History ==
=== Creation of organizations and meetings (2019-2022) ===
In January 2019, the digital publication Gedar was launched to give a voice to the organizations and activists of the mugimendu sozialista. It declared itself the propaganda and political communication tool of the movement, created to serve as a political instrument for the working class.

In February of the same year, Gazte Koordinadora Sozialista (GKS) was introduced at the Auzolana Fronton in Vitoria-Gasteiz. GKS was established with the aim of addressing youth issues from a class perspective, working alongside Ikasle Abertzaleak and shaping what would later become the Socialist Movement. Both organizations launched various joint initiatives, the most notable being Euskal Herriko Gazte Sozialisten Topagunea (Basque for "Meeting Point of Socialist Youth of Euskal Herria").

That same year, Erraki emerged with the goal of engaging in self-managed spaces such as gaztetxes. The idea behind Erraki was to establish the necessary frameworks to overcome the limitations of isolated management in such spaces through class solidarity and by providing mechanisms for self-defense.

In October 2020, Itaia, a socialist women's network that had existed since 2018, formally defined itself as a "socialist women's organization." With this transition, Itaia became a distinct organization within the Socialist Movement, addressing gender issues from a class perspective.

That same year, the first Kontseilu Sozialista (Basque: "Socialist Council") was established in Iruñerria, Navarre. This new organization sought to analyze society as a whole from a socialist perspective and was intended to be an intergenerational organization—until then, the different organizations within the Socialist Movement had focused on specific areas of action, primarily youth. Over time, more branches of Kontseilu Sozialistak emerged in different regions of the Basque Country, including the French Basque Country.

In 2021, within the Socialist Movement, the organization Ekida was created with the goal of promoting art and culture from a socialist perspective.

=== Creation of the Socialist Council of Euskal Herria (2023) ===
For the first time since the separation of Ikasle Abertzaleak from the MLNV and the subsequent formation of various organizations within the Socialist Movement, a political organization has been established to serve as both the political reference and leadership of the movement as a whole. The Euskal Herriko Kontseilu Sozialista ("Socialist Council of the Basque Country") was officially introduced on December 16, 2023, at the Astelena Fronton in Eibar, before an audience of over 1,500 communist militants.

The previously existing Kontseilu Sozialistak have been reorganized into territorial and sectoral branches within this new central organization.

=== Expansion of the Socialist Movement (2022–present) ===
On July 17, 2022, a group of young activists from Catalonia, Valencia, and Mallorca publicly announced the creation of a new political space called Horitzó Socialista. The movement emerged following a split from the youth organization of the independentist left, Arran, due to political, ideological, and strategic differences within the organization. This development led to the formation of the Organització Juvenil Socialista in Catalonia, Valencia, and Mallorca in 2023.

In March 2024, following a period of debate and reflection between the Encuentro por el Proceso Socialista and a majority sector of activists from the UJCE, the youth organization of the Communist Party of Spain (PCE), the Coordinadora Juvenil Socialista (CJS) was founded. The organization was launched in multiple cities, including Madrid, Burgos, Cáceres, Gijón, Valladolid, Albacete, Zafra, Seville, Zaragoza, Murcia, Granada, Guadalajara, and Málaga.

On December 14, 2024, CJS organized its first demonstration in Madrid under the slogan "Building the Revolutionary Alternative." Thousands of young people participated in the march, which began at Plaza de la Villa and concluded with a rally at the Casino de la Reina, near Embajadores. During the demonstration, participants carried banners with slogans such as "¡No pasarán!," evoking historical symbols of the anti-fascist struggle.

On April 27, 2024, Creba Socialista was introduced as a gathering and training space for the Socialist Movement in Galicia. This space culminated in the creation of the Coordinadora da Mocidade Socialista, announced via X on September 07, 2025.
