= Segi (organization) =

SEGI

Segi is a Basque pro-independence and revolutionary left-wing organization. It forms part of the Basque National Liberation Movement and is aligned with Langile Abertzaleen Batzordeak and Batasuna.

Segi is proscribed as a terrorist organisation (as a member of ETA) by both the Spanish and French authorities as well as the European Union as a whole. In its decision, on 27 February 2007, the Grand Chamber of the European Court of Justice (ECJ) dismissed the appeal of the illegal Basque organisation "Gestoras Pro Amnistia" and Segi members against their dismissal by the European Council with claims for damages suffered as a result of inclusion in the "terrorist list". The UK intervened with Spain – it was the only other EU state to do so, as a symbol of the support of the rest of the European Council.

== Background ==
In 2002 Segi was classed as a "terrorist" organization by the Spanish National Court magistrate Judge Baltasar Garzón, thus banning it as a component of ETA.

Garzón had previously banned the two other Basque youth organizations that preceded Segi: Jarrai and Haika.

Spanish and other European courts have banned a number of ETA-related organizations such as newspapers – Egin (1998), Egunkaria (2003); youth organisations – Jarrai (1999), Haika (2001), Segi (2002); prisoner associations – Askatasuna (2002) and Gestoras Pro-Amnistia (2003) and political parties such as Herri Batasuna (1997) and its successor Batasuna (2003). All those decisions have been based on the alleged direct coordination of such organisations with ETA (i.e. the organisations have been declared "members of a terrorist group" and of "cooperation with terrorist groups" by helping in the recruitment of new members and supporting ETA's finances).

According to An Phoblacht the case descended into a farce when another judge in the Spanish National Court considered that Garzón’s arguments "were not valid" and released all the detainees. However, another report suggests that the Supreme Court ruled they were a terrorist organization, but had not been placed on the country's terrorist list before the court's January 19 ruling.

== Support from abroad ==
Ógra Shinn Féin (the youth wing of political party Sinn Féin), which maintains fraternal relations with Segi, has called for the "immediate release of our comrades in Euskal Herria". It has begun an online petition to demand the reversal of the decision to declare Segi to be an illegal and terrorist organization. The petition claims that the Spanish Government has "decided to brand a completely legitimate political group as terrorists in an attempt to subvert the ever present Basque national liberation struggle". It is also campaigning for the release of the National Executive of Segi, who were arrested at a protest and sentenced to 6 years imprisonment. Ógra Shinn Féin has passed a motion in support of Segi at a recent congress, declaring their support.
