= List of international trips made by Maia Sandu =

This is a list of international trips made by Maia Sandu, the 6th President of Moldova and the former Prime Minister of Moldova (serving in June – November 2019).

== International trips as Prime Minister (2019) ==
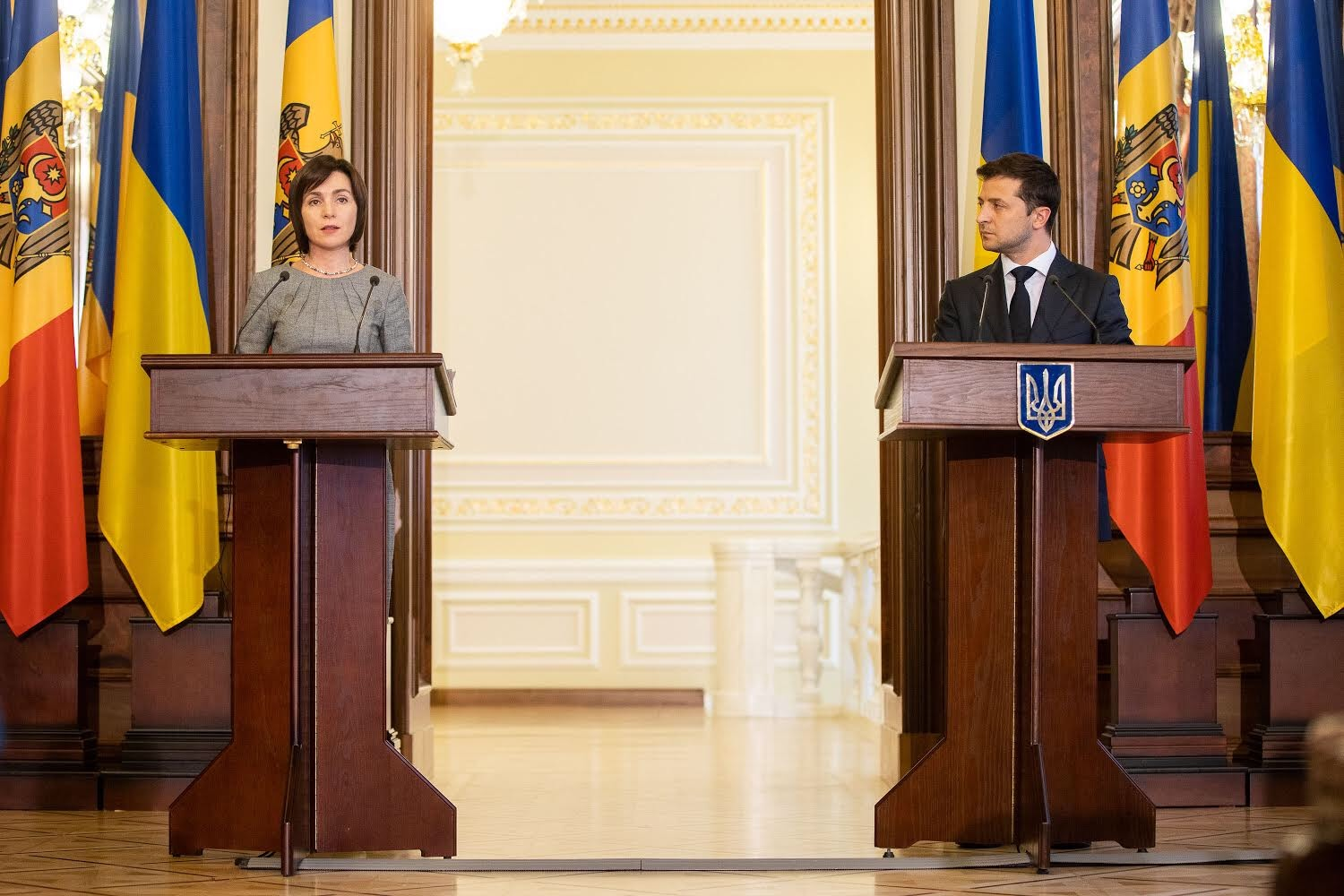
Sandu with Volodymyr Zelenskyy in Kyiv, July 2019

During her prime ministerial term she made:

- One visit to Romania, Belgium, Ukraine, Germany, Lithuania and United States.

#	Country	Location	Date	Details
1	Romania	Bucharest	2 July	Met with: Klaus Iohannis – President of Romania; Viorica Dăncilă – Prime Minister of Romania; Călin Popescu-Tăriceanu – President of the Senate; Marcel Ciolacu – President of the Chamber of Deputies
1	Belgium	Brussels	3–4 July	Met with: Donald Tusk – President of the European Council; Johannes Hahn – European Commissioner for European Neighbourhood Policy and Enlargement Negotiations; Pierre Moscovici – European Commissioner for Economic and Financial Affairs, Taxation and Customs; Cecilia Malmström – European Commissioner for Trade; Maroš Šefčovič – Vice-President of the European Commission; Jens Stoltenberg – Secretary General of NATO
2	Ukraine	Kyiv	11 July	Met with: Volodymyr Zelenskyy – President of Ukraine
3	Germany	Berlin	16 July	Met with: Angela Markel – Chancellor of Germany; Annegret Kramp-Karrenbauer – Federal Minister of Defense; Leader of the CDU
4	Lithuania	Vilnius	22 August	Met with: Gitanas Nausėda – President of Lithuania; Saulius Skvernelis – Prime Minister of Lithuania; Linas Antanas Linkevičius – Minister of Foreign Affairs
5	United States	Washington, D.C.	11 September	Met with: Mike Pence – Vice President of the United States; Ivanka Trump – Senior Advisor to the President; Justin Muzinich – Deputy Secretary of the Treasury; David Norquist – Deputy Secretary of Defense; Eliot Engel – Chair of the House Foreign Affairs Committee

== As President ==
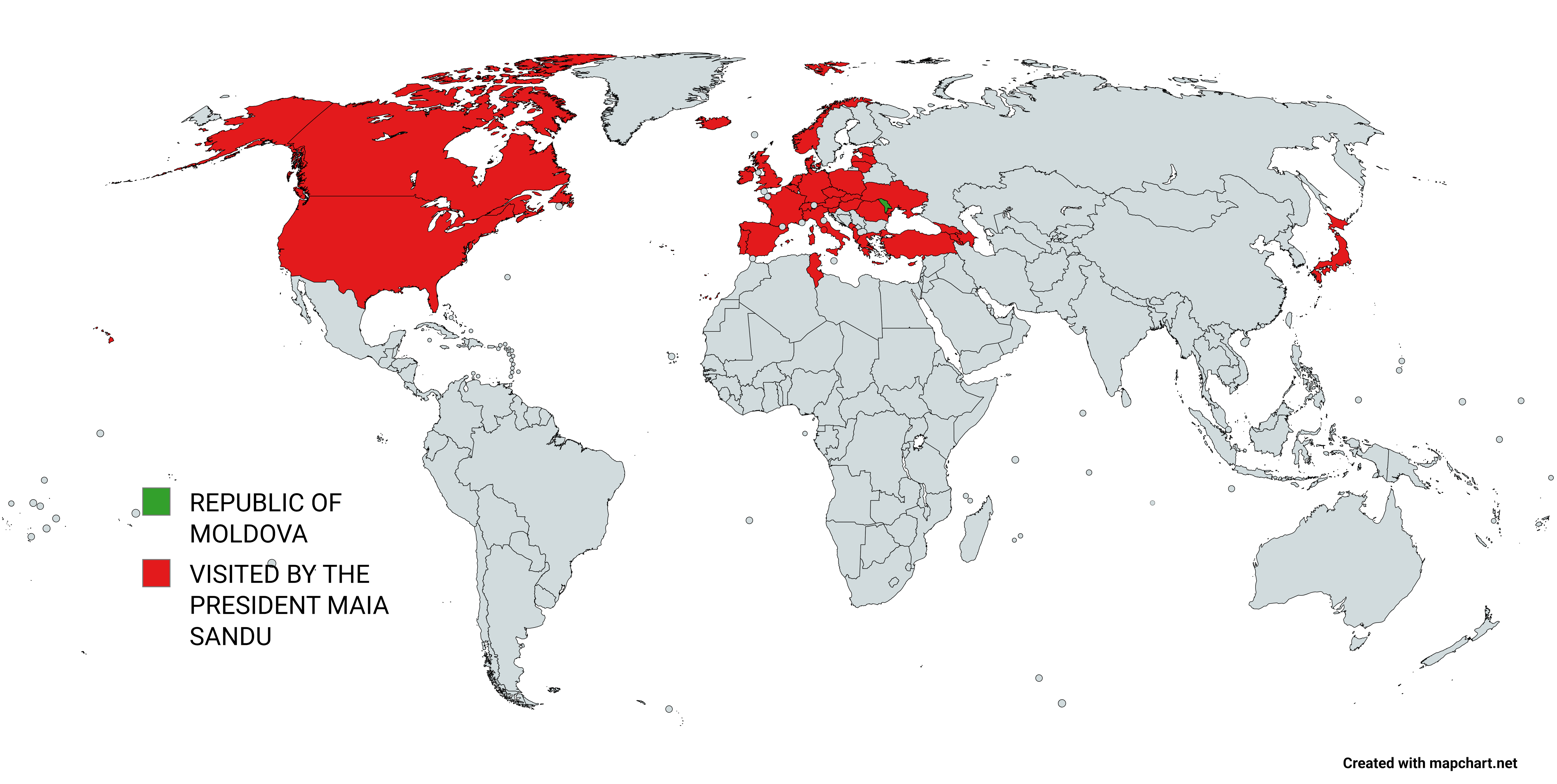
Map of international trips made by Maia Sandu as president: (May 2026)

Since she took office on 24 December 2020 she has made:

- One visit to Georgia, Tunisia, Japan, Canada, Iceland, Slovenia, Portugal, Azerbaijan, Montenegro, Latvia, Turkey, Armenia, Estonia and Finland.
- Two visits to Spain, Albania, Holy See, Cyprus, Lithuania, Ireland, Norway and Hungary.
- Three visits to Austria and Czech Republic.
- Four visits to Switzerland, United Kingdom, Greece and Netherlands.
- Five visits to Italy and United States.
- Six visits to Poland.
- Eight visits to Belgium.
- Nine visits to Germany.
- Ten visits to Ukraine.
- Eleven visits to Romania.
- Thirteen visits to France.

== 2021 ==
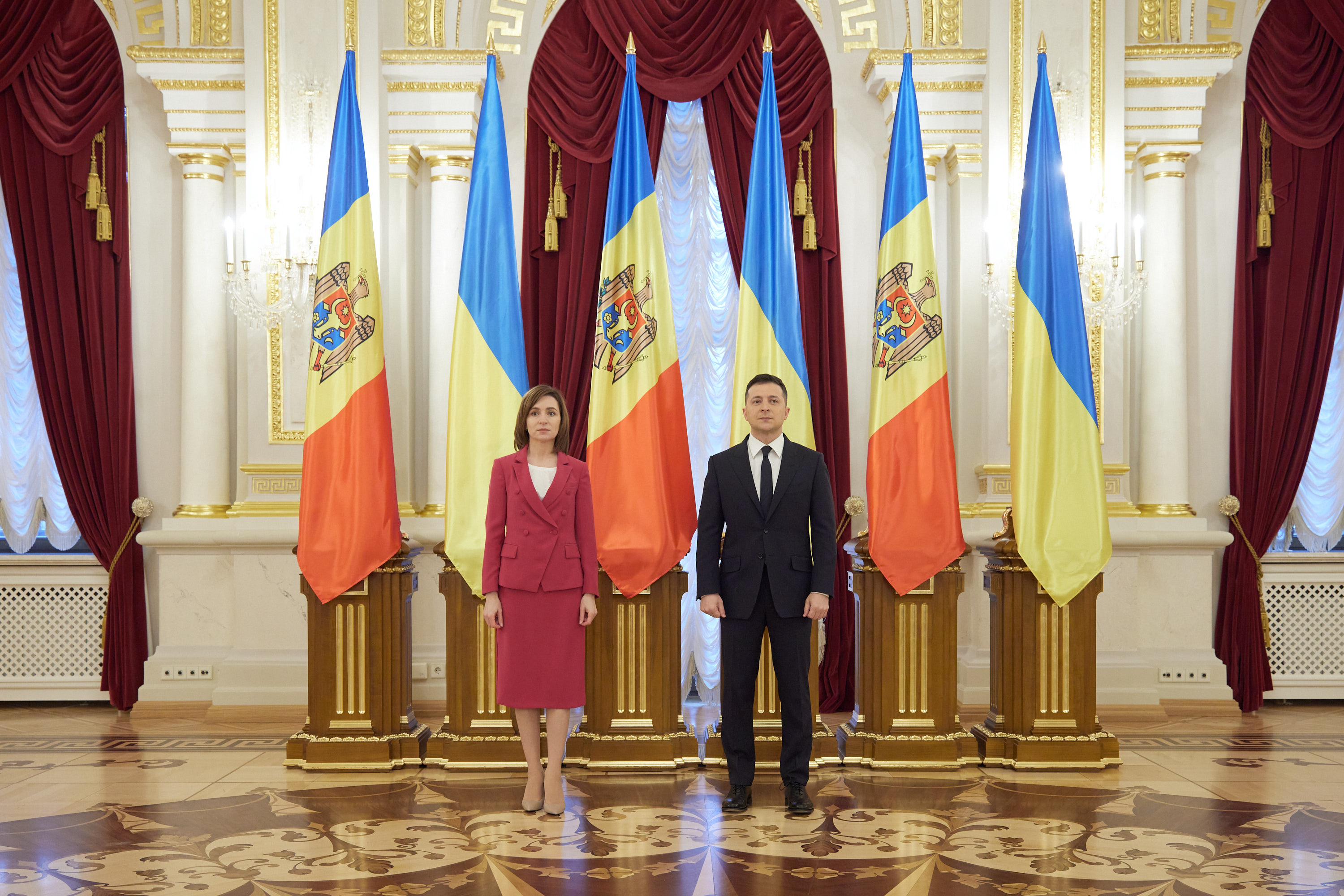
Official welcoming ceremony held for Sandu in Kyiv.

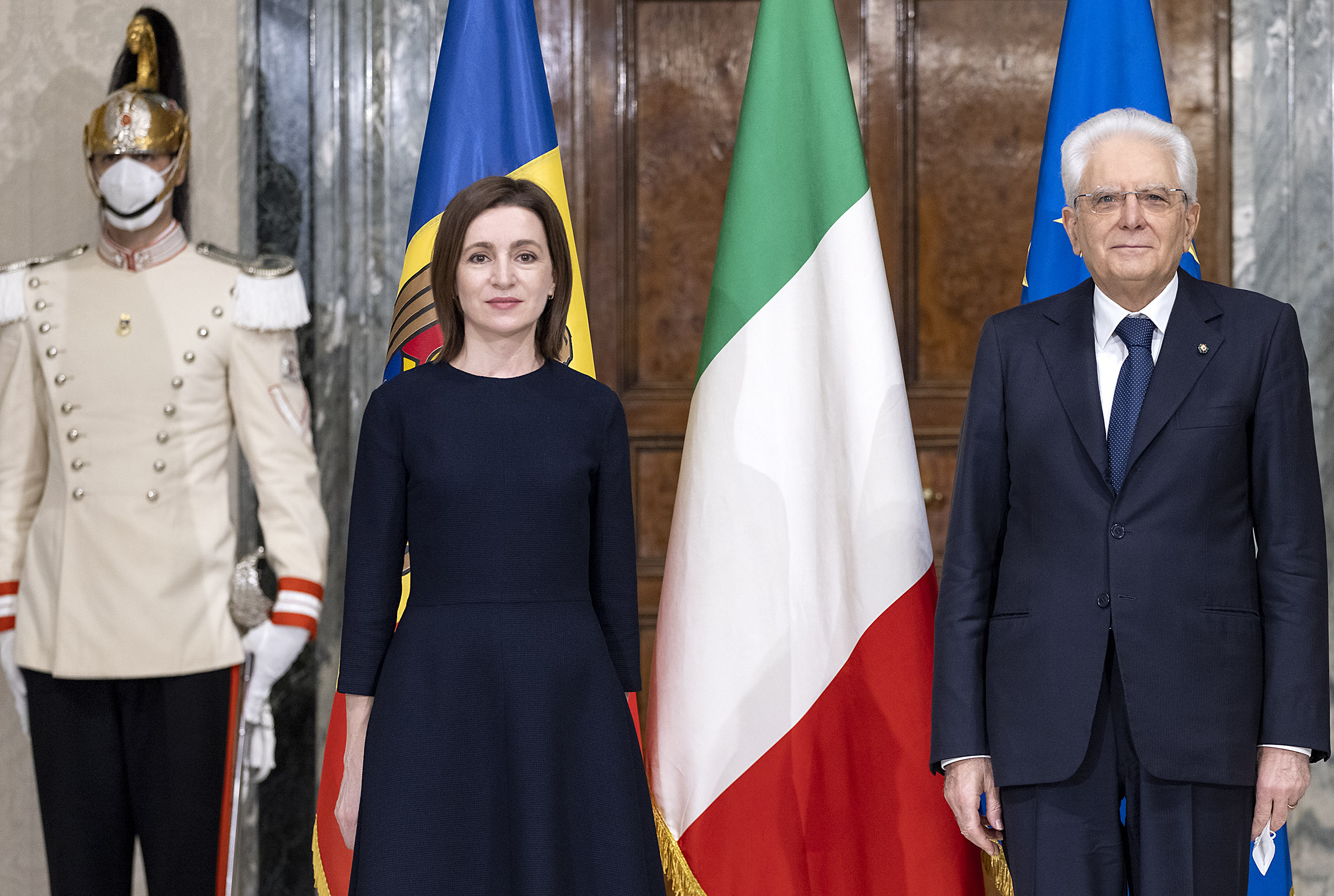
Sandu with Italian President Sergio Mattarella in Rome.

#	Country	Location	Date	Details
1	Ukraine	Kyiv	12 January	Met with: Volodymyr Zelenskyy – President of Ukraine; Denys Shmyhal – Prime Minister of Ukraine; Dmytro Razumkov – Chairman of the Verkhovna Rada
2	Belgium	Brussels	18–19 January	Met with: Ursula von der Leyen – President of the European Commission; David Sassoli – President of the European Parliament; Charles Michel – President of the European Council; Josep Borrell – Vice-President of the European Commission; High Representative of the Union for Foreign Affairs and Security Policy; Valdis Dombrovkis – Executive Vice President of the European Commission for An Economy that Works for People; European Commissioner for Trade; Johannes Hahn – European Commissioner for Budget and Administration; Didier Reynders – European Commissioner for Justice; Olivér Várhelyi – European Commissioner for Neighbourhood and Enlargement; Philippe, King of the Belgians
3	France	Paris	3–4 February	Met with: Emmanuel Macron – President of France; Gérard Larcher – President of the Senate; Richard Ferrand – President of the National Assembly; Jean-Yves Le Drian – Minister for Europe and Foreign Affairs; Amélie de Montchalin – Minister of Public Transformation and Service; Louise Mushikiwabo – Secretary-General of the Organisation internationale de la Francophonie; Didier Migaud – President of the High Authority for the Transparency of Public Life
4	France	Strasbourg	18–19 April	Met with: Marija Pejčinović Burić – Secretary General of the Council of Europe; Rik Daems – President of the Parliamentary Assembly of the Council of Europe; Róbert Ragnar Spanó – President of the European Court of Human Rights; Gianni Buquicchio – President of the Venice Commission; Jeanne Barseghian – Mayor of Strasbourg; Joseph Daul – Former President of the European People's Party; Dunja Mijatović – Commissioner for Human Rights; Leen Verbeek – Dutch King's Commissioner of Flevoland; Carlo Monticelli – Vice-Governor for Financial Strategy at the Council of Europe Development Bank
4	Romania	Bucharest	20 April	Met with: Klaus Iohannis – President of Romania; Florin Cîțu – Prime Minister of Romania; Anca Dragu – President of the Senate; Ludovic Orban – President of the Chamber of Deputies
5	Germany	Berlin	19–20 May	Met with: Frank-Walter Steinmeier – President of Germany; Angela Merkel – Chancellor of Germany (Video conference); Heiko Maas – Federal Minister for Foreign Affairs; Annegret Kramp-Karrenbauer – Federal Minister of Defense; Armin Laschet – Minister-President of North Rhine-Westphalia; Leader of the Christian Democratic Union; Norbert Roettgen – Chair of the Bundestag Foreign Affairs Committee; Günther Krichbaum – Member of the Bundestag
6	Italy	Rome	18–20 June	Met with: Sergio Mattarella – President of Italy; Elisabetta Casellati – President of the Senate; Roberto Fico – President of the Chamber of Deputies; Andrea Orlando – Minister of Labour and Social Policies; Piero Fassino – Member of the Chamber of Deputies; Chair of the Foreign Affairs Committee; Alessandra Maiorino – Member of the Senate; Loredana Russo – Member of the Senate; Valeria Biagiotti – Former Ambassador to Moldova
6	Poland	Warsaw	21 June	Met with: Andrzej Duda – President of Poland; Tomasz Grodzki – Marshal of the Senate; Elżbieta Witek – Marshal of the Sejm
7	Georgia	Batumi	19–20 July	Participated in the 17th Batumi International Conference. Met with: Salome Zourabichvili – President of Georgia; Charles Michel – President of the European Council; Volodymyr Zelenskyy – President of Ukraine; Irakli Garibashvili – Prime Minister of Georgia
8	Ukraine	Kyiv	23–24 August	Participated in the inaugural Crimea Platform Summit. Met with: Kersti Kaljulaid – President of Estonia; Egils Levits – President of Latvia; Stefan Löfven – Prime Minister of Sweden; Valdis Dombrovkis – Executive Vice President of the European Commission for An Economy that Works for People; European Commissioner for Trade; Alexander Schallenberg – Federal Minister of European and International Affairs of Austria
9	United States	New York	21 September	Gave a speech at the 76th Session of the UN General Assembly. Met with: António Guterres – Secretary-General of the United Nations; Guy Parmelin – President of Switzerland; Gitanas Nauseda – President of Lithuania
10	Austria	Vienna	21–22 October	Met with: Alexander Van der Bellen – President of Austria; Werner Kogler – Vice Chancellor of Austria; Federal Minister for Arts, Culture, the Civil Service and Sport; Michael Linhart – Federal Minister for European and International Affairs; Helga Schmid – Secretary General of the OSCE
11	France	Paris	11–12 November	Participated in the 4th Paris Peace Forum. Met with: Emannuel Macron – President of France; Alar Karis – President of Estonia; Guðni Th. Jóhannesson – President of Iceland
12	Romania	Bucharest	23 November	Met with: Klaus Iohannis – President of Romania; Florin Cîțu – Prime Minister of Romania; Marcel Ciolacu – President of the Chamber of Deputies; Alina Gorghiu – Vice President of the Senate; Sorin Grindeanu – Former Prime Minister of Romania
13	Belgium	Brussels	14–16 December	Participated in the 6th Eastern Partnership Summit. Met with: Ursula von der Leyen – President of the European Commission; Charles Michel – President of the European Council; Gitanas Nausėda – President of Lithuania; Volodymyr Zelenskyy – President of Ukraine; Ilham Aliyev – President of Azerbaijan; Alexander De Croo – Prime Minister of Belgium; Sanna Marin – Prime Minister of Finland; Irakli Garibashvili – Prime Minister of Georgia; Nikol Pashinyan – Prime Minister of Armenia; Josep Borrell – Vice-President of the European Commission; High Representative of the Union for Foreign Affairs and Security Policy; Olivér Várhelyi – European Commissioner for Neighbourhood and Enlargement; Mikołaj Dowgielewicz – Director General and Permanent Representative of the European Investment Bank; Apostolos Tzitzikostas – President of the European Committee of the Regions

== 2022 ==
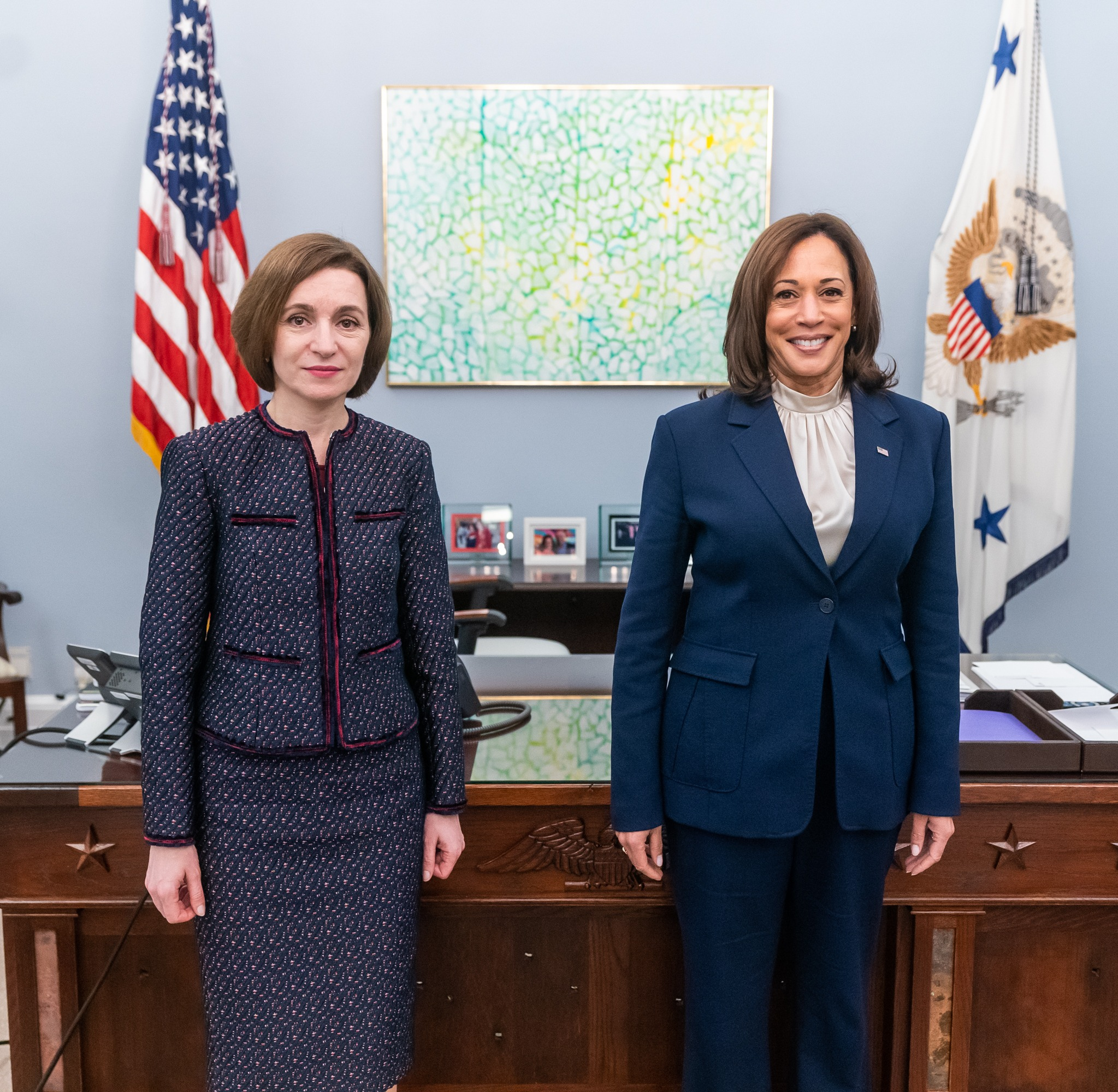
Sandu with US Vice President Kamala Harris at the White House.

#	Country	Location	Date	Details
14	Germany	Munich	18–20 February	Participated in the 58th Munich Security Conference. Met with: Olaf Scholz – Chancellor of Germany; Kiril Petkov – Prime Minister of Bulgaria; Johannes Hahn – European Commissioner for Budget and Administration; Mircea Geoană – Deputy Secretary General of NATO; Jürgen Stock – Secretary General of Interpol; Christoph Heusgen – Chair of the Munich Security Conference; Nils Schmid – Member of the Bundestag; Jared Cohen – CEO of Jigsaw; Alexander Soros – Deputy Chair of the Open Society Foundations
15	Belgium	Brussels	17–18 May	Gave a speech in the European Parliament. Met with: Roberta Metsola – President of the European Parliament; Charles Michel – President of the European Council; Ursula von der Leyen – President of the European Commission; Alexander De Croo – Prime Minister of Belgium; Josep Borrell – Vice-President of the European Commission; High Representative of the Union for Foreign Affairs and Security Policy; Olivér Várhelyi – European Commissioner for Neighbourhood and Enlargement; David McAllister – Chair of the European Parliament Foreign Affairs Committee
15	France	Paris	19 May	Met with: Emmanuel Macron – President of France; Gérard Larcher – President of the Senate; Rémy Rioux – Chief Executive of the French Development Agency
16	Netherlands	Rotterdam	31 May–1 June	Participated in the European People's Party Congress. Met with: Roberta Metsola – President of the European Parliament; Nicos Anastasiades – President of Cyprus; Karl Nehammer – Chancellor of Austria; Andrej Plenkovic – Prime Minister of Croatia; Kyriakos Mitsotakis – Prime Minister of Greece; Nicolae Ciucă – Prime Minister of Romania; Eduard Heger – Prime Minister of Slovakia; Krišjānis Kariņš – Prime Minister of Latvia; Wopke Hoekstra – Deputy Prime Minister, Minister of Foreign Affairs of the Netherlands; Vincent Van Peteghem – Deputy Prime Minister, Minister of Finance of Belgium; Johannes Hahn – European Commissioner for Budget and Administration; Friedrich Merz – Member of the German Bundestag; Leader of the Christian Democratic Union of Germany; Karoline Edstadler – Federal Minister for the European Union and the Constitution of Austria; Averof Neofytou – Member of the Cypriot House of Representatives; President of the Democratic Rally of Cyprus; Joseph Daul – Former President of the European People's Party
17	Greece	Thessaloniki	10–11 June	Participated in the South-East European Cooperation Process Summit. Met with: Kyriakos Mitsotakis – Prime Minister of Greece; Borut Pahor – President of Slovenia; Olaf Scholz – Chancellor of Germany; Kiril Petkov – Prime Minister of Bulgaria; Charles Michel – President of the European Council
18	Ukraine	Kyiv, Borodianka, Bucha, Irpin	27 June	Met with: Volodymyr Zelenskyy – President of Ukraine
19	Greece	Athens	4–5 July	Participated in the 26th Annual Economist Government Roundtable. Met with: Katerina Sakellaropoulou – President of Greece; Nikos Dendias – Minister of Foreign Affairs; Dritan Abazović – Prime Minister of Montenegro; Mike Pompeo – Former United States Secretary of State; Yulia Tymoshenko – People's Deputy of Ukraine; Francis Fukuyama
19	Lithuania	Vilnius	6 July	Participated in the Statehood Day of Lithuania. Met with: Gitanas Nausėda – President of Lithuania; Ingrida Šimonytė – Prime Minister of Lithuania; Viktorija Čmilytė-Nielsen – Speaker of the Seimas
20	Poland	Warsaw	14 July	Met with: Andrzej Duda – President of Poland; Tomasz Grodzki – Marshal of the Senate; Elżbieta Witek – Marshal of the Sejm
21	Romania	Bucharest	28–29 July	Met with: Klaus Iohannis – President of Romania; Nicolae Ciucă – Prime Minister of Romania; Alina Gorghiu – Acting President of the Senate
22	Austria	Alpbach	21–23 August	Participated in the European Forum Alpbach. Met with: Karl Nehammer – Chancellor of Austria; Othmar Karas – First Vice-President of the European Parliament; Günther Platter – Governor of Tyrol; Andreas Treichl – President of the European Forum Alpbach
23	United Kingdom	London	17–18 September	Attended the State funeral of Elizabeth II. Met with: Nadhim Zahawi – Minister for Intergovernmental Relations; Minister for Equalities
23	United States	New York	18–21 September	Gave a speech at the 77th Session of the UN General Assembly. Met with: António Guterres – Secretary-General of the United Nations; Jens Stoltenberg – Secretary General of NATO; Ursula von der Leyen – President of the European Commission; Alexander Van der Bellen – President of Austria; Sauli Niinistö – President of Finland; Zuzana Čaputova – President of Slovakia; Kassym-Jomart Tokayev – President of Kazakhstan; Justin Trudeau – Prime Minister of Canada; Samantha Power – Administrator of the USAID
23	Germany	Berlin	22–23 September	Met with: Olaf Scholz – Chancellor of Germany; Svenja Schulze – Federal Minister for Economic Cooperation and Development; Michel Roth – Chair of the Bundestag Foreign Affairs Committee; Nils Schmid – Member of the Bundestag
24	Czech Republic	Prague	5–7 October	Participated in the inaugural European Political Community. Held a press conference alongside: Emmanuel Macron – President of France; Petr Fiala – Prime Minister of the Czech Republic; Met with: Mario Draghi – Prime Minister of Italy; Mark Rutte – Prime Minister of the Netherlands; Alexander De Croo – Prime Minister of Belgium; Pedro Sánchez – Prime Minister of Spain; Eduard Heger – Prime Minister of Slovakia; Katrín Jakobsdóttir – Prime Minister of Iceland; Xavier Bettel – Prime Minister of Luxembourg
25	Romania	Bucharest	31 October–1 November	Gave a speech at the Romanian Women: Gender Equality as National Commitment Conference. Met with: Klaus Iohannis – President of Romania; Nicolae Ciucă – Prime Minister of Romania; Alina Gorghiu – Acting President of the Senate
26	Tunisia	Djerba	18–20 November	Participated in the 18th Francophonie Summit.
26	France	Paris	20–22 November	Attended the 3rd Moldova Support Platform. Met with: Emmanuel Macron – President of France; Yaël Braun-Pivet – President of the National Assembly; Olivér Várhelyi – European Commissioner for Neighbourhood and Enlargement; Rémy Rioux – Chief Executive of the French Development Agency
27	Japan	Tokyo	30 November–3 December	Gave a speech at the World Assembly for Women. Met with: Fumio Kishida – Prime Minister of Japan; Hiroyuki Hosoda – Speaker of the House of Representatives; Yoshimasa Hayashi – Minister of Foreign Affairs; Guðni Th. Jóhannesson – President of Iceland
27	United States	Washington, D.C.	5–7 December	Gave a speech at the International Anti-Corruption Conference. Met with: Kamala Harris – Vice President of the United States; Nancy Pelosi – Speaker of the House of Representatives; Janet Yellen – Secretary of the Treasury; Jennifer Galhorm – Secretary of Energy; Jake Sullivan – National Security Advisor; Samantha Power – Administrator of the USAID; Kristalina Georgieva – Managing Director of the IMF; Bob Menendez – Chair of the Senate Foreign Relations Committee; James Risch – Ranking Member of the Senate Foreign Relations Committee; Michael McCaul – Ranking Member of the House Foreign Affairs Committee; David Price – Member of the House of Representatives; August Pfluger – Member of the House of Representatives; Linda Thomas-Greenfield – US Ambassador to the United Nations; Marija Pejčinović Burić – Secretary General of the Council of Europe; Stephen Harper – Chair of the International Democrat Union; Erna Solberg – Leader of the Conservative Party of Norway; Daniel Twining – President of the International Republican Institute
28	Switzerland	Geneva	11–12 December	Gave a speech at the Effective Development Co-operation Summit. Met with: Ignazio Cassis – President of Switzerland; Klaus Schwab – Founder and Executive Chairman of the World Economic Forum

== 2023 ==
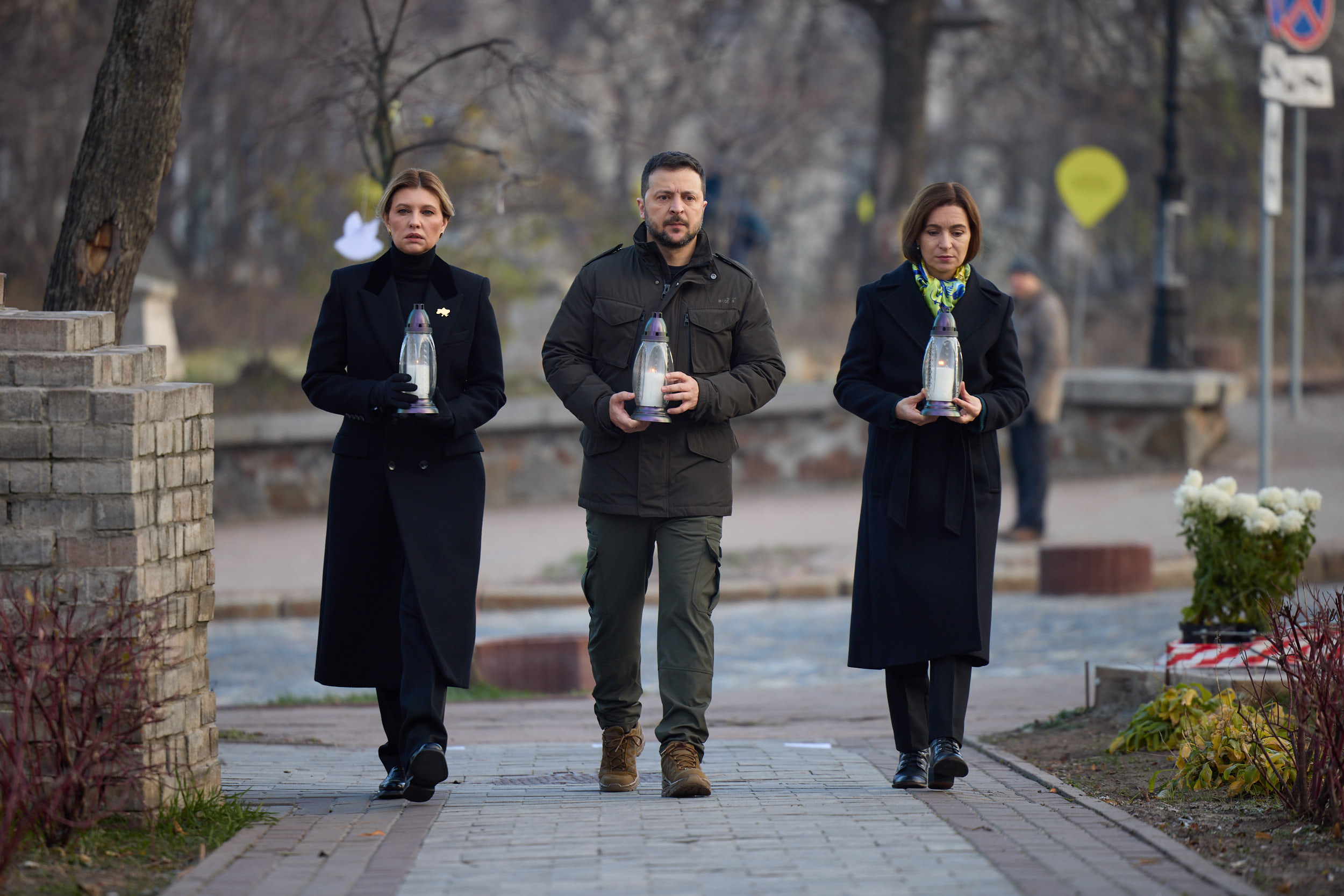
Sandu with Volodymyr and Olena Zelenskyy in Kyiv.

#	Country	Location	Date	Details
29	Switzerland	Davos	17–19 January	Participated in the World Economic Forum. Met with: Alain Berset – President of Switzerland; Ursula von der Leyen – President of the European Commission; Olaf Scholz – Chancellor of Germany; Mark Rutte – Prime Minister of the Netherlands; Pedro Sánchez – Prime Minister of Spain; Kyriakos Mitsotakis – Prime Minister of Greece; Leo Varadkar – Prime Minister of Ireland; Xavier Bettel – Prime Minister of Luxembourg; Laurence Boone – Secretary of State for European Affairs of France; Werner Hoyer – President of the European Investment Bank; Odile Renaud-Basso – President of the European Bank for Reconstruction and Development; Markus Krebber – President and CEO of RWE; Levent Cakiroglu – CEO of Koç Holding; Alexander Soros – Deputy Chair of the Open Society Foundations; Tony Blair – Former Prime Minister of the United Kingdom; Prince Guillaume, Hereditary Grand Duke of Luxembourg; Spoke at the panel discussion on the War in Europe: Year 2 alongside: Sanna Marin – Prime Minister of Finland; Gregory Meeks – Ranking Member of the United States House Foreign Affairs Committee; Jean-Pierre Clamadieu – Chairman of Engie
30	Germany	Munich	17–19 February	Participated in the 59th Munich Security Conference. Met with: Sauli Niinistö – President of Finland; Nataša Pirc Musar – President of Slovenia; Gitanas Nausėda – President of Lithuania; Petr Pavel – President-elect of the Czech Republic; Alexander de Croo – Prime Minister of Belgium; Ulf Kristersson – Prime Minister of Sweden; Jonas Gahr Støre – Prime Minister of Norway; Ursula von der Leyen – President of the European Commission; Andrej Plenković – Prime Minister of Croatia; Kaja Kallas – Prime Minister of Estonia; Antony Blinken – United States Secretary of State; Frans Timmermans – First Vice President of the European Commission; European Commissioner for Climate Action; Helga Schmid – Secretary General of the OSCE; Johannes Hahn – European Commissioner for Budget and Administration; Mélanie Joly – Minister of Foreign Affairs of Canada; Wolfgang Schmidt – Head of the Chancellery of Germany; Federal Minister for Special Affairs of Germany; Svenja Schulze – Federal Minister for Economic Cooperation and Development of Germany; Kristalina Georgieva – Managing Director of the International Monetary Fund; Alexander Dobrindt – First Deputy Leader of the CDU/CSU Group in the German Bundestag; Spoke at the Beyond the Alliance: Partnering up for European Security panel alongside: Jens Stoltenberg – Secretary General of NATO; Sauli Niinistö – President of Finland; Mette Frederiksen – Prime Minister of Denmark
30	Poland	Warsaw	21–22 February	Met with: Andrzej Duda – President of Poland; Joe Biden – President of the United States
30	Romania	Bucharest	23 February	Met with: Klaus Iohannis – President of Romania; Nicolae Ciucă – Prime Minister of Romania; Marcel Ciolacu – President of the Chamber of Deputies
31	Ukraine	Bucha	31 March	Attended the 2023 Bucha Summit. Spoke at a join press conference alongside: Volodymyr Zelenskyy – President of Ukraine; Eduard Heger – Prime Minister of Slovakia; Robert Golob – Prime Minister of Slovenia; Andrej Plenković – Prime Minister of Croatia
32	Romania	Bucharest	2 April	Met with: Klaus Iohannis – President of Romania; Olaf Scholz – Chancellor of Germany; Margareta, Custodian of the Crown of Romania
33	United Kingdom	London	6 May	Attended the coronation of Charles III and Camilla. Met with: James Cleverly – Secretary of State for Foreign, Commonwealth and Development Affairs
34	Canada	Ottawa, Montreal	11 May	Met with: Justin Trudeau – Prime Minister of Canada; Mary Simon – Governor General of Canada; Anthony Rota – Speaker of the House of Commons; Mélanie Joly – Minister of Foreign Affairs; Anita Anand – Minister of National Defence; Alexandra Mendès – Assistant Deputy Speaker of the House of Commons
34	United States	Chicago	12–13 May	Participated in the Moldovan-American Convention. Met with: Dick Durbin – Senate Majority Whip; Mike Lawler – Member of the House of Representatives; Erin McKee – Assistant Administrator of the USAID for Europe and Eurasia
34	Iceland	Reykjavík	16–17 May	Participated in the 4th Council of Europe Summit. Met with: Guðni Th. Jóhannesson – President of Iceland; Katalin Novák – President of Hungary; Nikos Christodoulides – President of Cyprus; Mark Rutte – Prime Minister of the Netherlands; Robert Abela – Prime Minister of Malta; Síofra O'Leary – President of the European Court of Human Rights
35	Austria	Salzburg	27–28 July	Participated in the Salzburg Summit. Met with: Alexander Van der Bellen – President of Austria; Karl Nehammer – Chancellor of Austria; Spoke at a panel discussion alongside: Mehmet Şimşek – Minister of Treasury and Finance of Turkey; Sim Ann – Senior Minister of State for Foreign Affairs of Singapore; Børge Brende – President of the World Economic Forum
36	Greece	Athens	21 August	Met with: Kyriakos Mitsotakis – Prime Minister of Greece; Volodymyr Zelenskyy – President of Ukraine; Nikolai Denkov – Prime Minister of Bulgaria; Andrej Plenković – Prime Minister of Croatia; Dimitar Kovačevski – Prime Minister of North Macedonia
37	Slovenia	Bled	28–29 August	Participated in the Bled Strategic Forum. Met with: Nataša Pirc Musar – President of Slovenia; Katerina Sakellaropoulou – President of Greece; Helga Schmid – Secretary General of the OSCE; Mélanie Joly – Minister of Foreign Affairs of Canada; Laurence Boone – Secretary of State for European Affairs of France
38	Netherlands	The Hague	4–5 September	Met with: Mark Rutte – Prime Minister of the Netherlands; Mei Li Vos – First Vice President of the Senate; Roelien Kamminga – First Deputy Speaker of the House of Representatives; King Willem-Alexander of the Netherlands
38	Romania	Bucharest	6 September	Participated in the Three Seas Initiative Summit. Met with: Klaus Iohannis – President of Romania; Marcel Ciolacu – Prime Minister of Romania; Nicolae Ciucă – President of the Senate
39	United States	New York	18–20 September	Gave a speech at the 78th Session of the UN General Assembly. Met with: Katalin Novák – President of Hungary; Alain Berset – President of Switzerland; Zuzana Čaputová – President of Slovakia; Rumen Radev – President of Bulgaria; Alar Karis – President of Estonia; Edgars Rinkēvičs – President of Latvia; Nikos Christodoulides – President of Cyprus; Ulf Kristersson – Prime Minister of Sweden; Jonas Gahr Støre – Prime Minister of Norway; Leo Varadkar – Prime Minister of Ireland; Antony Blinken – Secretary of State of the United States; Victoria Nuland – Under Secretary of State for Political Affairs of the United States; Samantha Power – Administrator of the USAID; Karan Bhatia – Head of Government Affairs and Public Policy at Google; Alexander Soros – Chair of the Open Society Foundations
40	Portugal	Lisbon	2–4 October	Met with: Marcelo Rebelo de Sousa – President of Portugal; Augusto Santos Silva – President of the Assembly of the Republic
40	Spain	Granada	5 October	Participated in the 3rd European Political Community Summit. Met with: Emmanuel Macron – President of France; Klaus Iohannis – President of Romania; Gitanas Nausėda – President of Lithuania; Mark Rutte – Prime Minister of the Netherlands; Xavier Bettel – Prime Minister of Luxembourg; Charles Michel – President of the European Council; Ursula von der Leyen – President of the European Commission; Roberta Metsola – President of the European Parliament
41	Czech Republic	Prague	16 October	Met with: Petr Pavel – President of the Czech Republic; Petr Fiala – Prime Minister of the Czech Republic; Miloš Vystrčil – President of the Senate; Markéta Pekarová Adamová – President of the Chamber of Deputies
41	Switzerland	Bern, Basel, Zürich	18–19 October	Met with: Alain Berset – President of Switzerland; Martin Candinas – President of the National Council; Guy Parmelin – Head of the Federal Department of Economic Affairs, Education and Research; Ignazio Cassis – Head of the Federal Department of Foreign Affairs; Élisabeth Baume-Schneider – Head of the Federal Department of Justice and Police; Joël Mesot – President of ETH Zurich
42	Ukraine	Kyiv	21 November	Met with: Volodymyr Zelenskyy – President of Ukraine; Charles Michel – President of the European Council

== 2024 ==
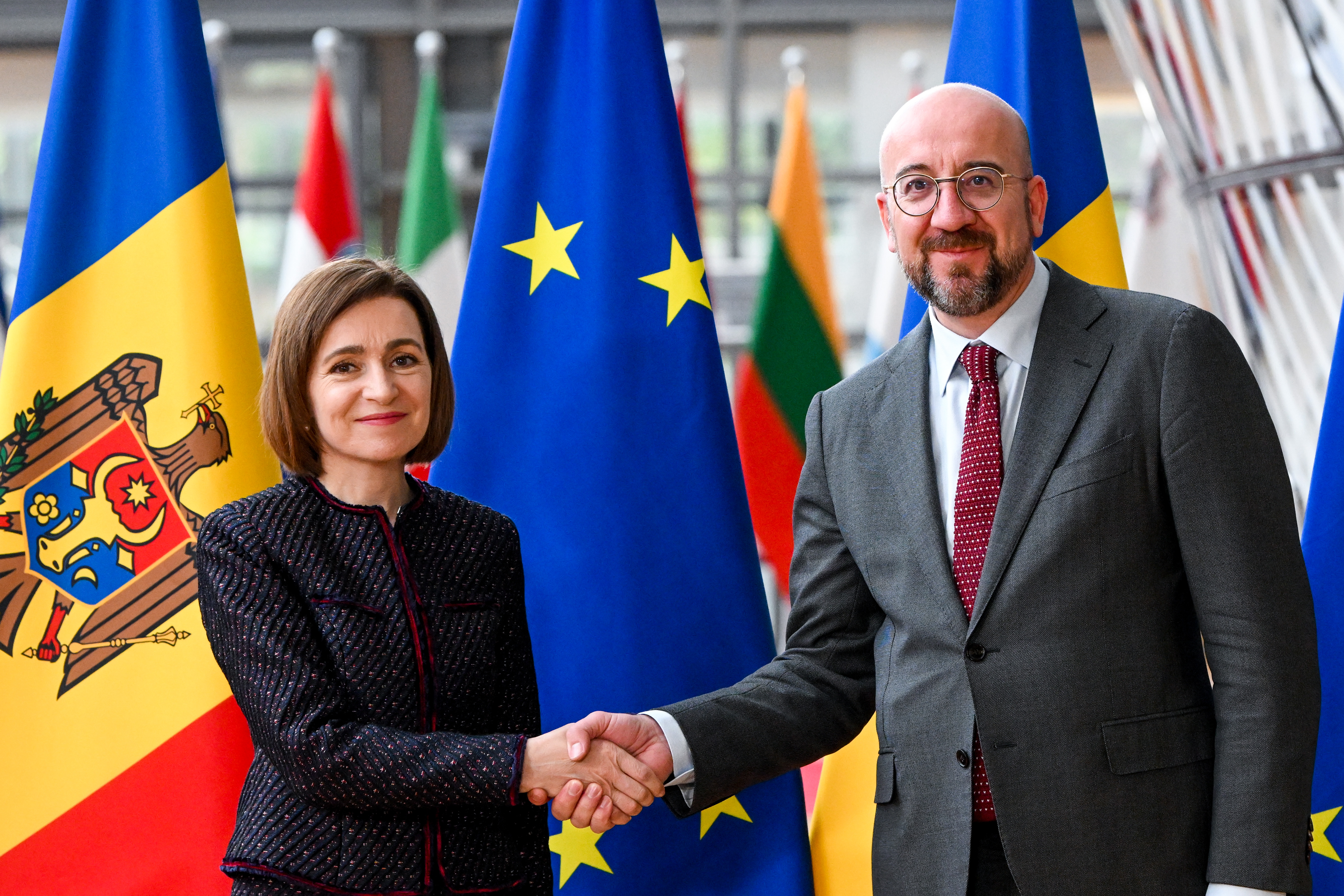
Sandu with European Council President Charles Michel in Brussels.

#	Country	Location	Date	Details
43	Romania	Timișoara	12–13 January	Met with: Dominic Fritz – Mayor of Timișoara; Margareta, Custodian of the Crown of Romania
44	Albania	Tirana	28 February	Participated in the Ukraine–Southeast Europe Summit. Met with: Volodymyr Zelenskyy – President of Ukraine; Edi Rama – Prime Minister of Albania; Jakov Milatović – President of Montenegro
45	Romania	Bucharest	5–6 March	Will meet with: Klaus Iohannis – President of Romania; Marcel Ciolacu – Prime Minister of Romania; Attended the European People's Party Congress. Had bilateral talks with: Viola Amherd – President of Switzerland; Petteri Orpo – Prime Minister of Finland; Luc Frieden – Prime Minister of Luxembourg; Alexander Dobrindt – Chairman of the CSU Group in the Bundestag
45	France	Paris	7–8 March	Met with: Emmanuel Macron – President of France; Yaël Braun-Pivet – President of the National Assembly; Mathias Cormann – Secretary-General of the OECD; Rémy Rioux – Chief Executive of the French Development Agency
46	Belgium	Brussels	28–29 April	Met with: Charles Michel – President of the European Council; Johannes Hahn – European Commissioner for Budget and Administration
47	Norway	Oslo	6–7 May	Met with: Jonas Gahr Støre – Prime Minister of Norway; Masud Gharahkhani – President of the Storting; King Harald V of Norway; Haakon, Crown Prince of Norway
48	Germany	Berlin, Leipzig	17–18 May	Met with: Frank-Walter Steinmeier – President of Germany; Olaf Scholz – Chancellor of Germany; Bärbel Bas – President of the Bundestag
49	Switzerland	Nidwalden	15–16 June	Participated in the Summit on Peace in Ukraine. Held bilateral meetings with: Alexander Stubb – President of Finland; Edgars Rinkēvičs – President of Latvia; Salome Zourabichvili – President of Georgia; Bajram Begaj – President of Albania; Kaja Kallas – Prime Minister of Estonia
50	United Kingdom	Woodstock	17–18 July	Attended the 4th European Political Community Summit. Had a roundtable meeting with: Keir Starmer – Prime Minister of the United Kingdom; Emmanuel Macron – President of France; Klaus Iohannis – President of Romania; Olaf Scholz – Chancellor of Germany; Donald Tusk – Prime Minister of Poland; Charles Michel – President of the European Council; Had bilateral meetings with: Dick Schoof – Prime Minister of the Netherlands; Mette Frederiksen – Prime Minister of Denmark; Evika Siliņa – Prime Minister of Latvia; Josep Borrell – Vice-President of the European Commission, High Representative of the Union for Foreign Affairs and Security Policy
50	Ireland	Dublin	19 July	Met with: Michael D. Higgins – President of Ireland; Simon Harris – Taoiseach
51	France	Paris, Nice	26–27 July	Attended the Opening ceremony of the 2024 Summer Olympics.
52	Italy	Milan, Turin, Parma, Bologna, Padua, Verona, Brescia	27–29 September	Met with the Moldovan diaspora.
53	Hungary	Budapest	7 November	Attended the 5th European Political Community Summit.
54	Azerbaijan	Baku	12 November	Attended the 2024 UN Climate Change Conference. Held discussions with: Recep Tayyip Erdoğan – President of Turkey; Kassym-Jomart Tokayev – President of Kazakhstan; Denis Bećirović – Chairman of the Presidency of Bosnia and Herzegovina; Tony Blair – Former Prime Minister of the United Kingdom
55	Romania	Bucharest	5 December	Met with: Elena Lasconi – Candidate for President of Romania; Mayor of Câmpulung
56	Belgium	Brussels	10–11 December	Met with: Ursula von der Leyen – President of the European Commission; António Costa – President of the European Council; Roberta Metsola – President of the European Parliament; Kaja Kallas – Vice-President of the European Commission; High Representative of the Union for Foreign Affairs and Security Policy; Roxana Mînzatu – Executive Vice-President of the European Commission; European Commissioner for Skills, Education and Culture, Quality Jobs and Social Rights; Piotr Serafin – European Commissioner for Budget and Administration; Marta Kos – European Commissioner for Enlargement; Michael McGrath – European Commissioner for Democracy, Justice and Rule of Law; Dan Jørgensen – European Commissioner for Energy and Housing; Mark Rutte – Secretary General of NATO; Prince Nikolaus of Liechtenstein

== 2025 ==
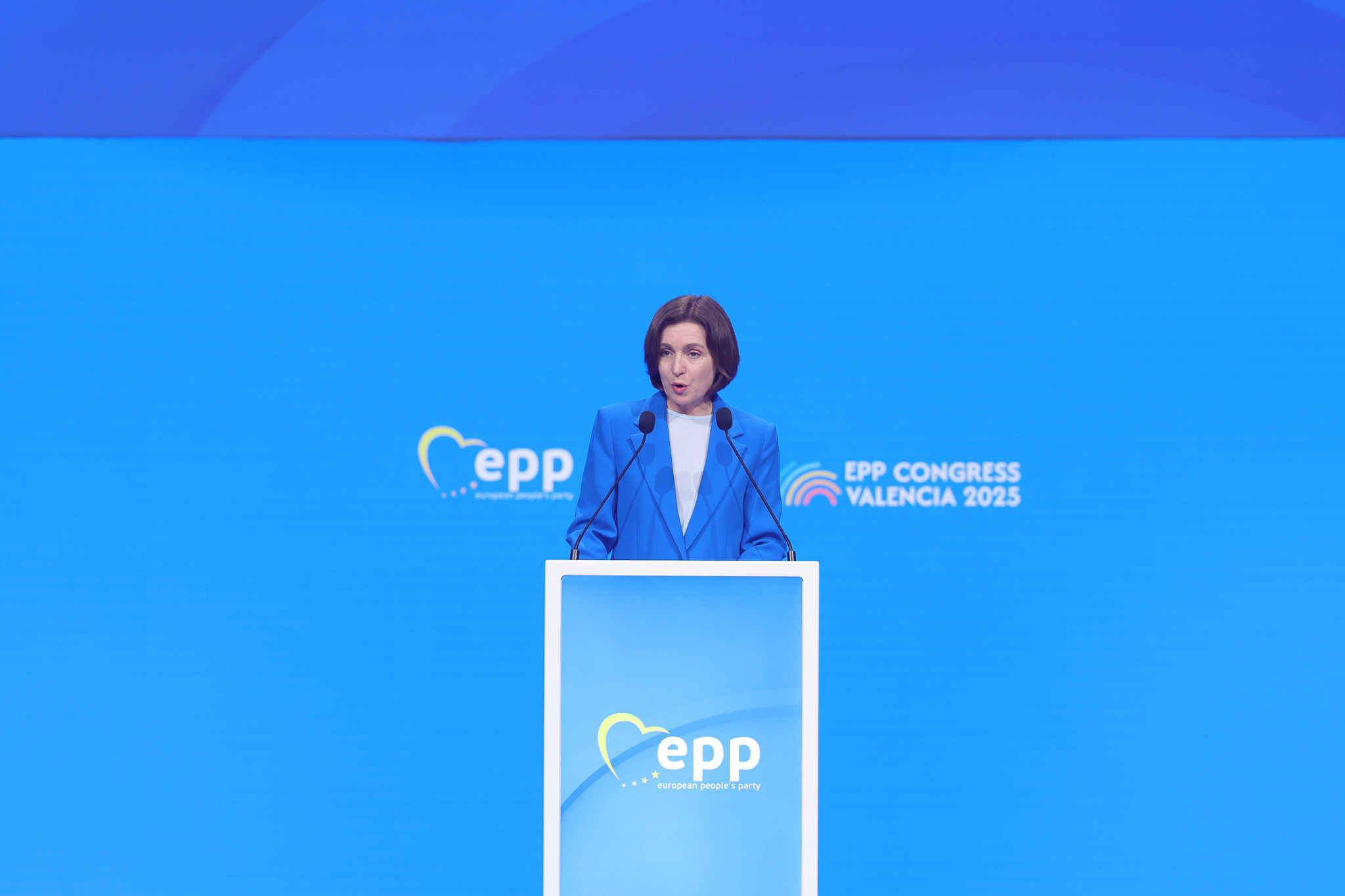
Sandu giving a speech at the EPP Congress in Valencia.

#	Country	Location	Date	Details
57	Ukraine	Kyiv	25 January	Met with: Volodymyr Zelenskyy – President of Ukraine; Denys Shmyhal – Prime Minister of Ukraine; Ruslan Stefanchuk – Chairman of the Verkhovna Rada
58	Poland	Oświęcim	27 January	Attended the Holocaust Remembrance Day at the Auschwitz-Birkenau State Museum.
59	Germany	Munich	14–15 February	Attended the 61st Munich Security Conference. Held discussions with: António Costa – President of the European Council; Salome Zourabichvili – President of Georgia (disputed); Edgars Rinkēvičs – President of Latvia; Alar Karis – President of Estonia; Micheál Martin – Prime Minister of Ireland; Alexander Schallenberg – Acting Chancellor of Austria; Mélanie Joly – Minister of Foreign Affairs of Canada
60	Germany	Gütersloh	20 February	Received the Reinhard Mohn Prize. Met with: Frank-Walter Steinmeier – President of Germany; Hendrik Wüst – Minister-President of North Rhine-Westphalia; Michael Otto – Chairman of the Supervisory Board of the Otto Group
61	France	Paris	10–11 March	Met with: Emmanuel Macron – President of France; Gérard Larcher – President of the Senate; Yaël Braun-Pivet – President of the National Assembly; Anne Hidalgo – Mayor of Paris; Rémy Rioux – Chief Executive of the French Development Agency; Audrey Azoulay – Director-General of UNESCO
62	Holy See	Vatican City	26 April	Attended the funeral of Pope Francis.
62	Spain	Valencia	27–29 April	Gave a speech at the European People's Party Congress. Met with: Christian Stocker – Chancellor of Austria; Kyriakos Mitsotakis – Prime Minister of Greece; Ulf Kristersson – Prime Minister of Sweden; Friedrich Merz – Chancellor-designate of Germany; Antonio Tajani – Deputy Prime Minister; Minister of Foreign Affairs and International Cooperation of Italy; Boyko Borisov – Member of the National Assembly of Bulgaria; Leader of GERB
63	Albania	Tirana	16–17 May	Attended the 6th European Political Community Summit. Held a roundtable discussion alongside: Emmanuel Macron – President of France; Giorgia Meloni – Prime Minister of Italy; Keir Starmer – Prime Minister of the United Kingdom; António Costa – President of the European Council; Ursula von der Leyen – President of the European Commission; Met with: Bajram Begaj – President of Albania; Volodymyr Zelenskyy – President of Ukraine; Mette Frederiksen – Prime Minister of Denmark; Kristen Michal – Prime Minister of Estonia; Evika Siliņa – Prime Minister of Latvia; Gintautas Paluckas – Prime Minister of Lithuania; Jonas Gahr Støre – Prime Minister of Norway; Dick Schoof – Prime Minister of the Netherlands; Rosen Zhelyazkov – Prime Minister of Bulgaria
63	Montenegro	Podgorica	19 May	Met with: Jakov Milatović – President of Montenegro; Milojko Spajić – Prime Minister of Montenegro; Andrija Mandić – President of the Parliament
64	Ukraine	Odesa	11 June	Attended the Ukraine-Southeast Europe Summit. Held trilateral talks with: Volodymyr Zelenskyy – President of Ukraine; Nicușor Dan – President of Romania
65	Germany	Munich, Frankfurt, Stuttgart	20–22 June	Received the Franz Josef Strauss Prize. Met with: Markus Söder – Minister-President of Bavaria; Markus Ferber – MEP; President of the Hanns Seidel Foundation; Met with the Moldovan diaspora.
66	Poland	Warsaw	7–8 July	Met with: Andrzej Duda – President of Poland; Donald Tusk – Prime Minister of Poland; Radosław Sikorski – Minister of Foreign Affairs; Met with the Moldovan diaspora.
66	Italy	Rome, Florence, Modena, Vicenza, Treviso, Venice	9–13 July	Gave a speech at the 2025 Ukraine Recovery Conference. Met with: Sergio Mattarella – President of Italy; Friedrich Merz – Chancellor of Germany; Met with the Moldovan diaspora.
67	United Kingdom	London, Nottingham	23–24 July	Met with: Charles III; Keir Starmer – Prime Minister of the United Kingdom; Met with the Moldovan diaspora.
68	France	Strasbourg	9 September	Gave a speech in the European Parliament. Met with: Roberta Metsola – President of the European Parliament; Kaja Kallas – Vice-President of the European Commission; High Representative for Foreign Affairs and Security Policy; Alain Berset – Secretary General of the Council of Europe
68	Italy	Rome	10–12 September	Met with: Giorgia Meloni – Prime Minister of Italy; Ignazio La Russa – President of the Senate of the Republic
68	Holy See	Vatican City	12 September	Met with: Pope Leo XIV
69	Denmark	Copenhagen	1–2 October	Attended the 7th European Political Community Summit. Participated in a roundtable alongside: Emmanuel Macron – President of France; Nicușor Dan – President of Romania; Donald Tusk – Prime Minister of Poland; António Costa – President of the European Council; Ursula von der Leyen – President of the European Commission; Kaja Kallas – Vice-President of the European Commission; High Representative for Foreign Affairs and Security Policy; Held bilateral meetings with: Mette Frederiksen – Prime Minister of Denmark; Volodymyr Zelenskyy – President of Ukraine; Gitanas Nausėda – President of Lithuania; Ilham Aliyev – President of Azerbaijan; Nikos Christodoulides – President of Cyprus; Bart De Wever – Prime Minister of Belgium; Petteri Orpo – Prime Minister of Finland; Micheál Martin – Prime Minister of Ireland; Mark Rutte – Secretary General of NATO
70	Italy	Venice	11 October	Gave a speech at the 35th anniversary ceremony of the Venice Commission. Met with: Alain Berset – Secretary General of the Council of Europe
71	Romania	Bucharest	26 October	Met with: Nicușor Dan – President of Romania; Bartholomew I of Constantinople; Patriarch Daniel of Romania
72	France	Paris	29 October	Attended the Paris Peace Forum. Met with: Nikol Pashinyan – Prime Minister of Armenia; Peter De Roover – President of the Chamber of Representatives of Belgium; Rémy Rioux – Chief Executive of the French Development Agency
73	Belgium	Brussels	4 November	Met with: António Costa – President of the European Council; Kaja Kallas – Vice-President of the European Commission; High Representative for Foreign Affairs and Security Policy; Marta Kos – European Commissioner for Enlargement
74	Cyprus	Nicosia	12 December	Met with: Nikos Christodoulides – President of Cyprus; Annita Demetriou – President of the House of Representatives
75	Greece	Athens	15 December	Met with: Konstantinos Tasoulas – President of Greece; Kyriakos Mitsotakis – Prime Minister of Greece
75	Netherlands	The Hague	16 December	Attended the Diplomatic Conference for the Adoption of the Convention Establishing an International Claims Commission for Ukraine. Met with: Dick Schoof – Prime Minister of the Netherlands; Mei Li Vos – President of the Senate; Thom van Campen – Speaker of the House of Representatives; Volodymyr Zelenskyy – President of Ukraine; Alain Berset – Secretary General of the Council of Europe

== 2026 ==
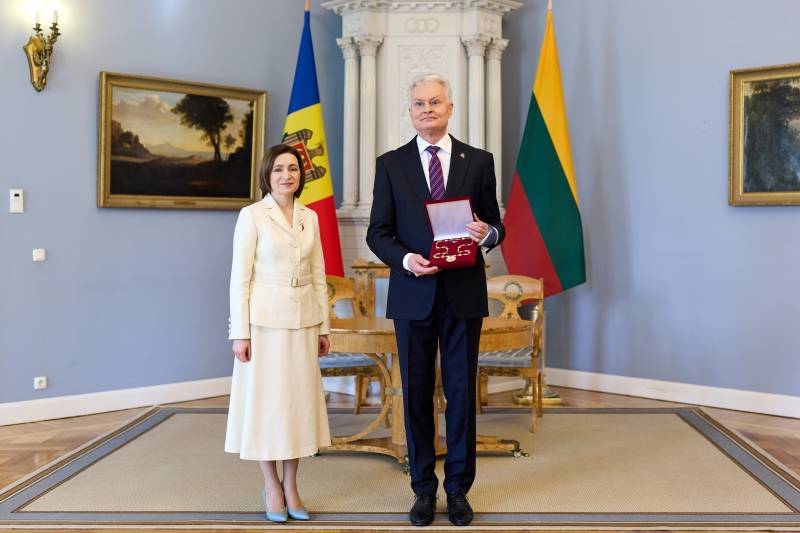
Sandu awarding the Order of the Republic to Gitanas Nausėda in Vilnius.

#	Country	Location	Date	Details
76	Cyprus	Nicosia	7 January	Met with: Nikos Christodoulides – President of Cyprus; Volodymyr Zelenskyy – President of Ukraine; António Costa – President of the European Council; Ursula von der Leyen – President of the European Commission
77	Poland	Warsaw	25–26 January	Met with: Karol Nawrocki – President of Poland; Donald Tusk – Prime Minister of Poland; Małgorzata Kidawa-Błońska – Marshal of the Senate; Włodzimierz Czarzasty – Marshal of the Sejm
77	France	Strasbourg	27 January	Gave a speech at the Winter Session of the Parliamentary Assembly of the Council of Europe. Met with: Petra Bayr – President of the Parliamentary Assembly of the Council of Europe; Alain Berset – Secretary General of the Council of Europe; Marta Cartabia – President of the Venice Commission; Mattias Guyomar – President of the European Court of Human Rights
78	Germany	Munich	13–15 February	Attended the 62nd Munich Security Conference. Met with: Edgars Rinkēvičs – President of Latvia; Jakov Milatović – President of Montenegro; Ulf Kristersson – Prime Minister of Sweden; Kristen Michal – Prime Minister of Estonia; Andrej Plenković – Prime Minister of Croatia; Marco Rubio – Secretary of State of the United States; Reem Alabali Radovan – Federal Minister for Economic Cooperation and Development of Germany; Mark Rutte – Secretary General of NATO; Giuseppe Cavo Dragone – Chair of the NATO Military Committee
79	Lithuania	Vilnius	10–11 March	Met with: Gitanas Nausėda – President of Lithuania; Inga Ruginienė – Prime Minister of Lithuania; Juozas Olekas – Speaker of the Seimas
80	Slovakia	Bratislava	26 March	Met with: Peter Pellegrini – President of Slovakia; Richard Raši – Chairman of the National Council; Robert Kaliňák – Deputy Prime Minister; Minister of Defence; Denisa Saková – Deputy Prime Minister; Minister of Economy
81	Latvia	Riga	1 April	Met with: Edgars Rinkēvičs – President of Latvia; Evika Siliņa – Prime Minister of Latvia; Daiga Mieriņa – Speaker of the Saeima
82	Ireland	Dublin	8 April	Met with: Catherine Connolly – President of Ireland; Micheál Martin – Taoiseach; Simon Harris – Tánaiste
83	Turkey	Antalya	17 April	Participated in the Antalya Diplomacy Summit. Met with: Recep Tayyip Erdoğan – President of Turkey; Ilham Aliyev – President of Azerbaijan; Nataša Pirc Musar – President of Slovenia; Denis Bećirović – Chairman of the Presidency of Bosnia and Herzegovina
84	Ukraine	Kyiv, Chernobyl	26 April	Met with: Volodymyr Zelenskyy – President of Ukraine
85	Armenia	Yerevan	3–4 May	Attended the 8th European Political Community Summit. Met with: Bart De Wever – Prime Minister of Belgium; Andrej Babiš – Prime Minister of the Czech Republic; Nikos Christodoulides – President of Cyprus; Guy Parmelin – President of the Swiss Confederation; Petteri Orpo – Prime Minister of Finland; Giorgia Meloni – Prime Minister of Italy; Luc Frieden – Prime Minister of Luxembourg; Keir Starmer – Prime Minister of the United Kingdom; Donald Tusk – Prime Minister of Poland; Pedro Sánchez – Prime Minister of Spain; Mark Rutte – Secretary General of NATO
86	Estonia	Tallinn	16 May	Met with: Alar Karis – President of Estonia; Kristen Michal – Prime Minister of Estonia; Lauri Hussar – President of the Riigikogu; Margus Tsankha – Minister of Foreign Affairs; Marko Mihkelson – Member of the Riigikogu
87	France	Strasbourg	19 May	Received the European Order of Merit. Met with: Roberta Metsola – President of the European Parliament
87	Netherlands	The Hague	20 May	Met with: Rob Jetten – Prime Minister of the Netherlands; Tom Berendsen – Minister of Foreign Affairs
87	Czech Republic	Prague	21 May	Attended the GLOBSEC Forum. Met with: Petr Pavel – President of the Czech Republic
88	Belgium	Brussels	22 June	Attended the 2nd EU-Moldova Summit. Met with: António Costa – President of the European Council; Ursula von der Leyen – President of the European Commission
89	France	Paris	13 July	Attended the Coalition of the Willing meeting. Held bilateral discussions with: Friedrich Merz – Chancellor of Germany; Christian Stocker – Chancellor of Austria
89	Ukraine	Kyiv	15 July	Attended the Ukraine-Southeast Europe Summit. Held bilateral discussions with: Volodymyr Zelenskyy – President of Ukraine; Andrej Plenkovic – Prime Minister of Croatia; Janez Janša – Prime Minister of Slovenia
90	Ukraine	Kyiv	24 August	Attended the Ceremony of the 35th anniversary of Ukraine's Independence and the Coalition of the Willing meeting.
91	Norway	Oslo	9 September	Attended the State funeral of Harald V.
92	Finland	Helsinki	2 October	Met with: Alexander Stubb – President of Finland; Petteri Orpo – Prime Minister of Finland; Jussi Halla-aho – Speaker of the Parliament
93	Hungary	Budapest	23–24 October	Met with: András Baka – President of Hungary; Péter Magyar – Prime Minister of Hungary

== Future trips ==
Country	Location	Date	Details
Ireland	Dublin	12 November	Sandu is scheduled to attend the 9th European Political Community Summit.
Cambodia	Phnom Penh	15–16 November	Sandu is scheduled to attend the 20th Organisation internationale de la Francophonie summit.
Turkey	Antalya	November	Sandu is scheduled to attend the 2026 United Nations Climate Change Conference.
