= Rémy Rioux =

French high-ranking civil servant (born 1969)

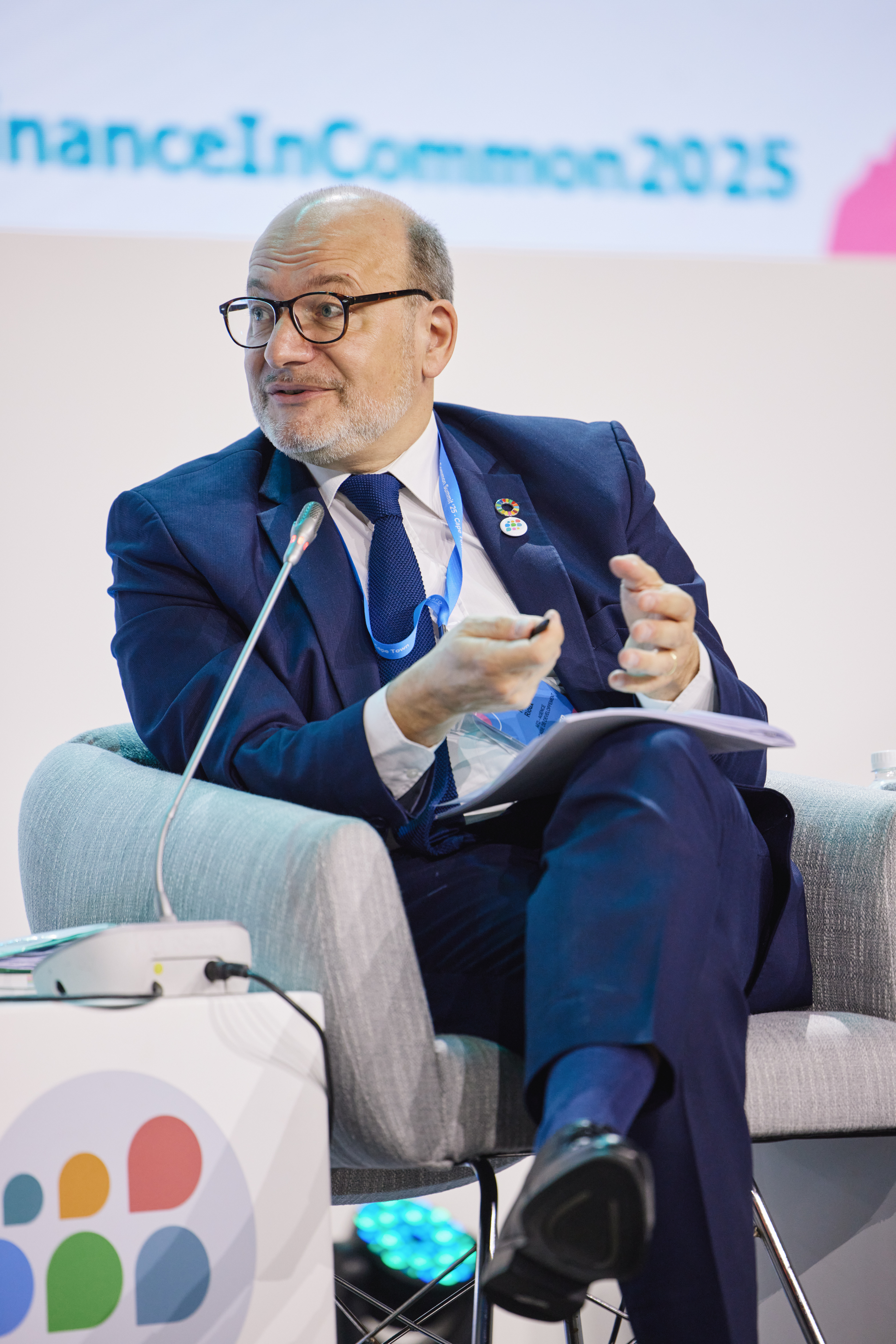
- Rioux in 2024
- Born: 26 June 1969 (age 57); Neuilly-sur-Seine, France
- Education: École Normale Supérieure; Sciences Po; École nationale d'administration
- Occupation: Civil servant
- Parent(s): Jean-Pierre Rioux; Hélène Rioux

Rémy Rioux (born 26 June 1969) is a French civil servant. He is the chief executive of the French Development Agency and since 2020, president of Finance in Common.

== Early life ==
Rémy Rioux was born on 26 June 1969 in Neuilly-sur-Seine near Paris.

He earned a master's degree in history at Paris I Pantheon-Sorbonne University, then a DEA at the Ecole des hautes études en sciences sociales. During his academic work, he focused on the historians Gabriel Monod and Jules Michelet under the supervision of Alain Corbin and Pierre Nora.

He graduated from the École Normale Supérieure, Sciences Po and the École nationale d'administration. In 1995, at the age of 26, he completed an internship in Benin.

== Career ==
=== At the Court of Audit ===
From 1997 to 2000 and again from 2002 to 2004, Rémy Rioux served as an auditor at the Court of Audit, where he carried out oversight assignments in the energy, defense, industry, foreign trade, and public indistrustrial sectors.

=== At the Ministry of the Interior ===
In the government of Prime Minister Lionel Jospin, he was an adviser to Interior Minister Daniel Vaillant from 2000 until 2002 where he was responsible for managing the ministry's budget and overseeing the transition to the euro.

=== At the Ministry of Economics and Finance ===
From 2004 to 2007, he served as head of the "Monetary Cooperation and Development with African, Caribbean and Pacific Countries" until within the Directorate General of the Treasury and Economic Policy (DGTPE). In this capacity, he oversaw relations with African countries and handled issues relating to the Franc Zone. During France’s presidency of the G20, he played a key role in bringing infrastructure and development to the forefront of the international agenda.

During his time at the French State Holdings Agency (APE) from 2007 until 2009, Rioux was on the boards of directors of France Médias Monde, France Télévisions, Groupe ADP, the Port of Le Havre, the RATP Group, Renault and SNCF. In 2011, he was a member of the task force set up at the French Treasury for the French presidencies of the G8 and G20. From 2012 until 2014, he was chief of staff to Finance Minister Pierre Moscovici, in the government of Prime Minister Jean-Marc Ayrault.

=== At the Ministry for Europe and Foreign Affairs ===
From 2014 until 2016, Rioux was Deputy Secretary General of the Ministry of Foreign Affairs under minister Laurent Fabius. In 2015, President François Hollande appointed him to develop reform proposals for both AFD and state-owned bank CDC, including a possible merger; however, the project was eventually abandoned.

In 2015, he coordinated the “finance” agenda of COP21 within the French negotiating team led by Laurence Tubiana.

=== At the French Development Agency ===
Rioux has been the chief executive of the French Development Agency since June 2016.Following the suggestion of Prime Minister Édouard Philippe, President Emmanuel Macron reappointed him for another four-year term in 2019 and again in September 2022.

Under his leadership, AFD Group’s annual commitments increased significantly from 8,3 billion euros in 2015 to 13,7 billion euros in 2025, and its activities were aligned with both the Paris Agreement and the United Nations Sustainable Development Goals.

In early 2022, he oversaw the creation of the AFD Group, bringing together AFD, Proparco, and Expertise France, in line with the 2021 French law on inclusive development and the fight against global inequalities.

At the organizational level, he promoted a “One Africa” approach aimed at overcoming the traditional divide between North Africa and Sub-Saharan Africa. He also established a “Three Oceans” department covering overseas territories and neighboring states, and expanded AFD’s geographic mandates, particularly in Europe’s neighborhood, including Ukraine and Moldova.

In Africa, he notably marked the reopening of AFD’s office in Kigali in April 2022 and announced in April 2022 and announced new investments in Western Sahara in 2025.

From 2017 to 2023, he served as Chair of the International Development Finance Club (IDFC), a group of 26 national and regional development banks committed to aligning financial flows with the Sustainable Development Goals.

Since its creation in 2020, he has also chaired the Finance in Common initiative, a global network bringing together 536 public development banks around shared objectives related to sustainable development and the fight against climate change. The initiative represents approximately €2.5 trillion in annual investments, accounting for nearly 15% of global investment.

In the summer of 2023, on the occasion of the Summit for a New Global Financing Pact, he co-founded — together with six Paris-based international organizations — the “Paris Dialogue” initiative, aimed at advancing sustainable development.

In July 2025, ahead of the Fourth International Conference on Financing for Development in Seville , he signed, alongside the members of this initiative, a joint “Call for Financing Sustainable Development.” Signatories included Audrey Azoulay, Director-General of UNESCO; Mathias Cormann, Secretary-General of the OECD; Louise Mushikiwabo, Secretary-General of the Organisation internationale de la Francophonie; Fatih Birol, Executive Director of the International Energy Agency; Philippe Varin, Secretary-General of the International Chamber of Commerce; and Carlo Monticelli, Governor of the Council of Europe Development Bank. In preparation for this conference, he was also mandated by the United Nations Secretary-General to work on mobilizing public development banks within the international financial architecture.

In 2024, he inaugurated the AFD Group Campus in Marseille, a training center dedicated to actors in international solidarity and sustainable development.

Ahead of the Paris 2024 Olympic Games, he was tasked by President Emmanuel Macron and IOC President Thomas Bach with organizing the first international summit on sport for development, bringing together over 500 participants, including heads of state, international organizations, athletes, and stakeholders from the sports and development sectors.

== Positions ==
Rémy Rioux has advocated for France’s “3D” approach to international policy, combining defense, diplomacy, and development, and has called for a shift from a traditional model of “official development assistance” to one of “solidarity-based and sustainable investment,grounded in respect, reciprocity, and the capacity to mobilize both public and private finance toward fair and sustainable transitions worldwide.

He has argued against framing climate and development as competing priorities, emphasizing that while development aid must be rethought, international cooperation itself cannot be interrupted. He has also warned about the consequences of reductions in funding for international solidarity and has called for a broader public debate on France’s relationship with the rest of the world.

Rémy Rioux has emphasized the growing importance of sport and culture as drivers of international development, particularly in Africa, highlighting his personal commitment to using development finance to support inclusive growth, social cohesion, and new forms of cooperation beyond traditional aid frameworks.

On Africa, he has defended the view that the concept of “Françafrique” persists primarily in the minds of its critics. He has urged a renewed perspective on the continent and stressed the need to move beyond the idea that development can be driven externally. In his view, relations between Africa and Europe are undergoing a transformation beyond the post-independence framework, and strengthening ties will require overcoming persistent misconceptions about Africa.

During debates on the immigration law discussed in the French Parliament in late 2023, he stated that “the only sustainable response to migration challenges is the development of countries in the Global South.

== Personal life ==
Rioux is married, and he has three children.

== Recognition ==
- Highest placed European in the 2026 Devex Power 50 - which lists the most influential global figures in development and international cooperation
- King of the National Order of Legion of Honour (2025)
- Gold Medal of Honour Medal for Overseas Commitment (2024)
- Knight of the Order of La Pléiade (2024)
- Member of the Académie des sciences d’outre-mer (2022)
- Knight of the National Order of Merit (2018)

== Publications ==
- Introductions à L'Economie africaine 2022, 2023, 2024, 2025 et 2026, La Découverte
- Avec François Adam et Olivier Ferrand, Finances publiques, Presses de Sciences Po, 2007
- Réconciliations, Débats publics, 2019
- Pour un monde en commun. Regard croisés entre l'Afrique et l'Europe, avec Achille Mbembe, Actes Sud, 2022

== Other activities ==
- European Council on Foreign Relations (ECFR), Member (since 2021)
- International Olympic Committee (IOC), Member of the Commission on Public Affairs And Social Development Through Sport
- La France s’engage Foundation, Member of the Board
- Proparco, chairman of the Board of Directors (since 2016)
- European Investment Bank (EIB), Alternate Member of the Board of Directors (since 2016)
- Organisation for Joint Armament Cooperation (OCCAR), Member of the Board of Auditors (2002-2004)
