= 2021 International Court of Justice judges election =

International Court of Justice judges election

The 2021 International Court of Justice election was held on 5 November 2021 at the United Nations Headquarters in New York City. The General Assembly and the Security Council concurrently elected Hilary Charlesworth (Australia) to the International Court of Justice for remainder of the nine-year term of office that had been held by Judge James Crawford (Australia).

In the election, two candidates were vying for the remaining term of one position, opened following the death of Judge Crawford, beginning on 5 November 2021, the date on which they were voted by the Security Council and General Assembly, and ending on 5 February 2024. The nominated candidates were Hilary Charlesworth (Australia) and Linos‑Alexander Sicilianos (Greece). After a single round of voting, Ms. Charlesworth (Australia) received the required majority in the Security Council, as well as an absolute majority of votes in the General Assembly.

== Election ==
Under the terms of the Statute of the ICJ, a candidate obtaining an absolute majority of votes in the General Assembly and the Security Council is considered elected. In the General Assembly, all 193 Member States in the General Assembly are electors. Accordingly, for the election, 97 votes constitute an absolute majority in the Assembly. In the Security Council, eight votes constitute an absolute majority and no distinction is made between its permanent and non‑permanent members.

Candidate	Round 1; 5 November 2021	
Candidate	GA	SC
(Australia) Hilary Charlesworth	119	11
(Greece) Linos-Alexandre Sicilianos	71	4
