= Linos-Alexandre Sicilianos =

Judge from Greece, former president of the ECHR

- Λίνος-Αλέξανδρος Σισιλιάνος
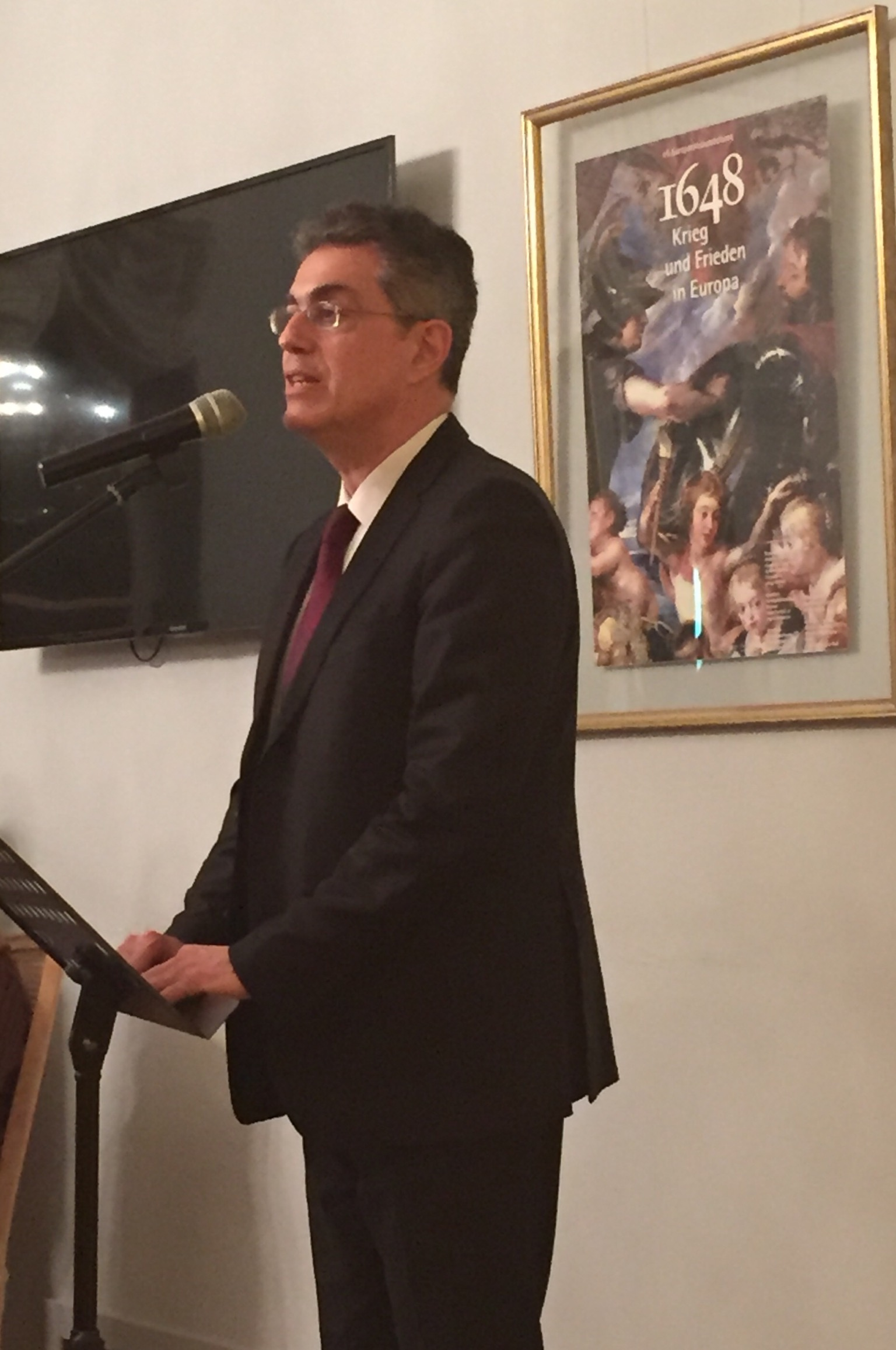
- Sicilianos in 2020

President of the European Court of Human Rights
- In office 5 May 2019 – 17 May 2020
- Preceded by: Guido Raimondi
- Succeeded by: Róbert Spanó

Judge of the European Court of Human Rights in respect of Greece
- In office 18 May 2011 – 17 May 2020
- Succeeded by: Ioannis Ktistakis

Personal details
- Born: 9 May 1960 (age 66) Athens, Greece
- Education: University of Athens

Linos-Alexandre Sicilianos (Greek: Λίνος-Αλέξανδρος Σισιλιάνος, romanized: Linos-Alexandros Sisilianos; born 9 May 1960) is a Greek jurist born in Athens, Greece. He was a judge of the European Court of Human Rights in respect of Greece between 2011 and 2020.

He studied law at the University of Athens from where he graduated in 1983. He followed up on his studies at the Robert Schuman University in Strasbourg, from where he obtained a MSc in International Law in 1984 and Doctorate in 1990. On 1 May 2017 he was appointed vice-president of the Court, and Section President of Section I. He was elected President of the European Court of Human Rights on 1 April 2019, succeeding Guido Raimondi. On 18 May 2020, Róbert Ragnar Spanó from Iceland succeeded him.

He was a candidate for the 2021 International Court of Justice judges election, but Hilary Charlesworth was elected instead.

In October 2021, he received a doctorate honoris causa from the French University Paris II Pathéon-Assas.
