= International Development Finance Club =

International partnership organization for development banks

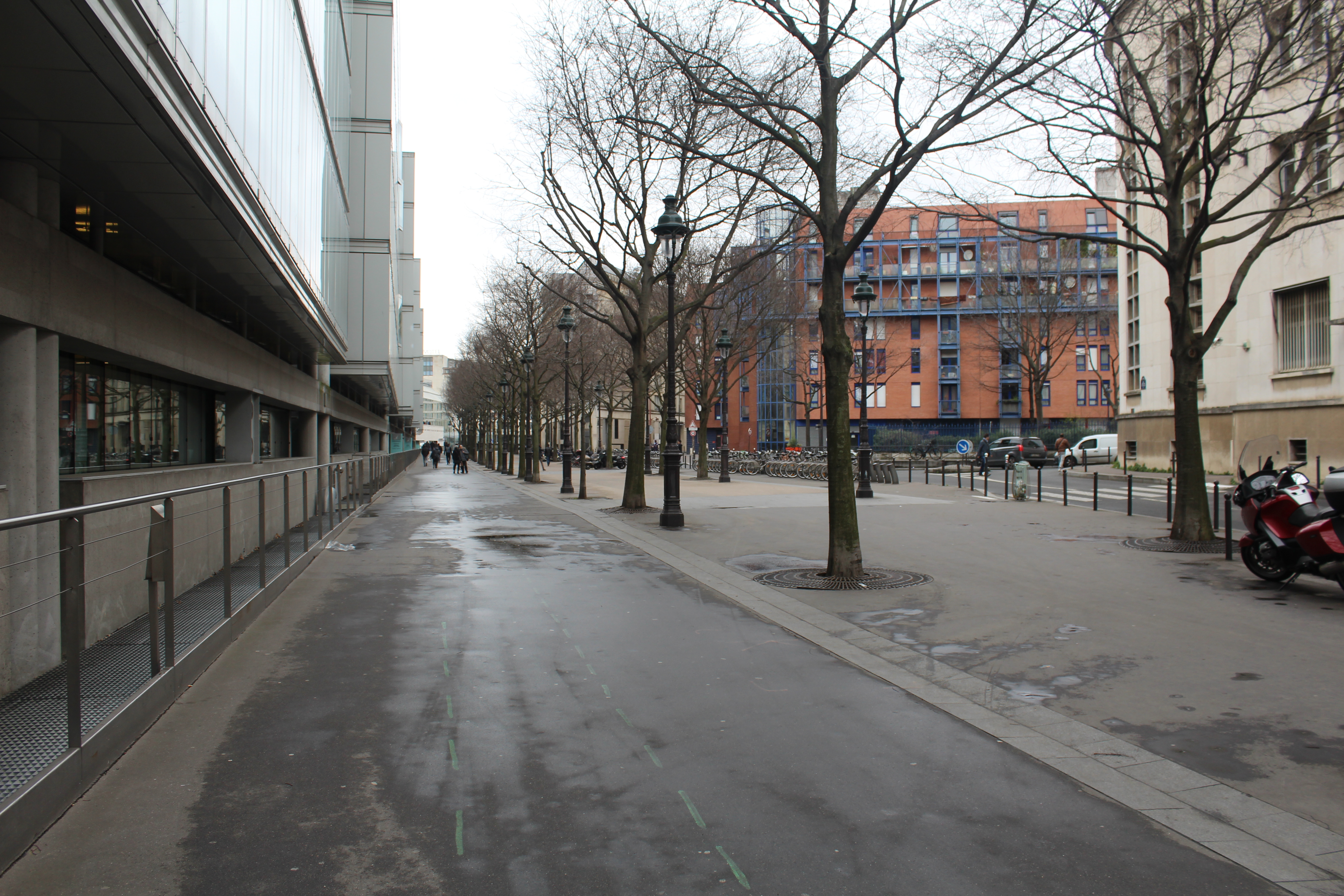
A view of the Roland-Barthes Street, in Paris, where the IDFC is headquartered.

The International Development Finance Club (IDFC) is a partnership of development banks whose aim is to complement each other's needs for a more efficient global development.

IDFC's Secretariat is headquartered in Paris, in the same building as the French Development Agency (5 rue Roland-Barthes, Paris).

== History ==
IDFC was founded in 2011 during the annual meeting of the International Monetary Fund and the World Bank.

The current IDFC's President (appointed in October 2017) is Rémy Rioux, chief executive of the French Development Agency.

== Objectives ==
- Identifying and developing joint business opportunities
- Sharing know-how and best practice experiences for mutual learning
- Agenda setting by joining forces and networking on issues of similar interest

== Members ==
As of July 2018, IDFC had 23 members:

- KfW
- Vnesheconombank
- French Development Agency
- Industrial Development Bank of Turkey
- Black Sea Trade and Development Bank
- Croatian Bank for Reconstruction and Development
- Small Industries Development Bank of India
- Indonesia Exim Bank
- China Development Bank
- Islamic Corporation for the Development of the Private Sector
- Korea Development Bank
- Japan International Cooperation Agency
- Central American Bank for Economic Integration
- CAF – Development Bank of Latin America and the Caribbean
- Nacional Financiera
- Bancoldex
- Corporación Financiera de Desarrollo
- Banco Nacional de Desenvolvimento Econômico e Social
- Banco Estado
- Caisse de Dépôt et de Gestion
- Development Bank of Southern Africa
- West African Development Bank
- Trade and Development Bank (formerly the PTA Bank)

The International Investment Bank was due to join IDFC by October 2018.

== See also ==
- Financial Stability Forum
- World Economics Association
- International financial institutions
