= Oddný Mjöll Arnardóttir =

Icelandic judge (born 1970)

Judge at the European Court of Human Rights
- Incumbent
- Assumed office 15 March 2023
- Nominated by: Government of Iceland
- Preceded by: Róbert Ragnar Spanó

Personal details
- Born: 16 January 1970 (age 56) Reykjavík, Iceland
- Education: University of Iceland; University of Edinburgh

Oddný Mjöll Arnardóttir (born 16 January 1970) is an Icelandic lawyer, human rights academic and judge, first female judge at the European Court of Human Rights with respect to Iceland since 2023. She previously served at the Court of Appeals.

== Career ==
Oddný was born on 16 January 1970 in Reykjavík, Iceland. She got a degree in law for the University of Iceland in 1994 and a PhD in Law for the University of Edinburgh in 2002 with the thesis Equality and Non-Discrimination in the European Convention on Human Rights; Towards a Substantive Approach.

She practised law between 1994 and 1996, and between 2002 and 2006. In 1995 she obtained a licence to practise as a district court attorney.

Oddný was also a lecturer at Bifröst University between 1999 and 2000, at the Icelandic Bar Admissions Programme between 2000 and 2018; and a professor of human rights at the Reykjavík University between 2006 and 2012 and at the University of Iceland between 2012 and 2023. She has also been a lecturer at other European universities.

She has participated in several conferences in Iceland and other countries on human rights. She was also co-editor of Retfærd, the Nordic Journal of Law and Justice, between 2016 and 2020 and a member of its editorial board between 2008 and 2016, as well as a member of the Committee of Reviewers for Lögrétta Law Review between 2004 and 2005, and 2007 and 2008.

She has been a member of several legal institutions in Iceland, such as the Icelandic Bar Association Law Commission between 2003 and 2005, the Icelandic National Bioethics Committee between 2003 and 2006, the Icelandic Human Rights Centre between 2007 and 2012, the Icelandic Immigration and Asylum Appeals Board in 2015, and the Advisory Committee on Registered Religious or Belief Associations in Iceland between 2015 and 2018. Between 2013 and 2017, she was Chairperson of the Board of the University of Iceland Human Rights Institute.

Her career as a judge began in 2017 when she was appointed judge of the Icelandic Court of Appeals, a position she held until 2023. In 2018, she was appointed ad hoc judge of the Supreme Court of Iceland and in 2021 of the Icelandic Court on Reopening of Judicial Proceedings.

Oddný was part of the second list of candidates that the Icelandic government presented in June 2022 to succeed Róbert Ragnar Spanó. On 24 January 2023, the Parliamentary Assembly of the Council of Europe elected by an asolute majority Oddný as a judge to the European Court of Human Rights representing Iceland and was sworn in on 15 March 2023.
