= Proparco =

Financial institution

- Type: Private
- Industry: Development finance
- Founded: 1977
- Headquarters: Paris, France,
- Key people: Françoise Lombard (CEO)
- Products: Feasibility studies, equity financing, advisory services, loans, consulting
- Website: www.proparco.fr

Proparco is a development finance institution partly owned by the French Development Agency (AFD) and private shareholders from the developed countries.

PROPARCO promotes private investment in Africa, Asia, Latin America, and the Middle East to reach the Sustainable Development Goals (SDGs). PROPARCO finances operations which are economically viable, financially profitable, environmentally sustainable and socially equitable. As of 2016, its shareholders' capital exceeded €693 million (US$773 million).

Since 2019, Proparco has participated in the Choose Africa initiative launched jointly with AFD to accelerate the growth of African SMEs, which consists of making available 2.5 billion euros over four years: 1.5 billion in bank loans and guarantees and 1 billion in equity investments in SMEs (direct investments or through private equity funds). In 2020, to play its part in the response to the COVID-19 crisis, Proparco is adding €1 billion under the Choose Africa Resilience plan.

== Impacts in 2016 ==
In 2016, the projects supported by Proparco contributed to:

- the creation or maintaining of'142 000 jobs directly and 732 000 indirectly
- the production of 802 gigawatts/hour (GWh) of renewable energy
- 6000 students receiving high quality services in financed establishments
- 406 M€ of value added in the countries of intervention through salaries and benefits

== Shareholders ==
The shareholding in Proparco is as depicted in the table below:

Shareholding in Proparco

| Rank | Name of owner | Percentage ownership |
|---|---|---|
| 1 | Agence française de développement | 79.8 |
| 2 | French financial institutions | 8.2 |
| 3 | International financial organisations | 10.0 |
| 4 | French companies | 1.4 |
| 5 | Investment funds & foundations | 0.6 |
| | Total | 100.0 |

French financial institutions include

- BNP Paribas
- BCPE IOM
- CDC Entreprises Elan PME (BpiFrance)
- Crédit Agricole
- Société Générale

International financial organizations include

- Aga Khan Fund for Economic Development (AKFED)
- Banque Marocaine du Commerce Extérieur (BMCE)
- Bank of Africa Group (BOA Group)
- Banque Ouest Africaine de Développement (BOAD)
- Development Bank of Latin America and the Caribbean (CAF)
- Development Bank of Southern Africa (DBSA)
- German Investment Corporation (DEG)

French companies include

- Bouygues
- Bolloré Africa Logistics
- Saur International
- Socotec international
- SOMDIAA
- SIPH
- ENGIE

Investment funds & foundations include

- Jean-Pierre Godon
- Amundi AFD Avenirs Durables
- Natixis Solidaire

== See also ==
- German Investment Corporation
- Danish International Development Agency
- French Development Agency
- Netherlands Development Finance Company
