= Jean-Pierre Rioux =

French historian (1939–2024)

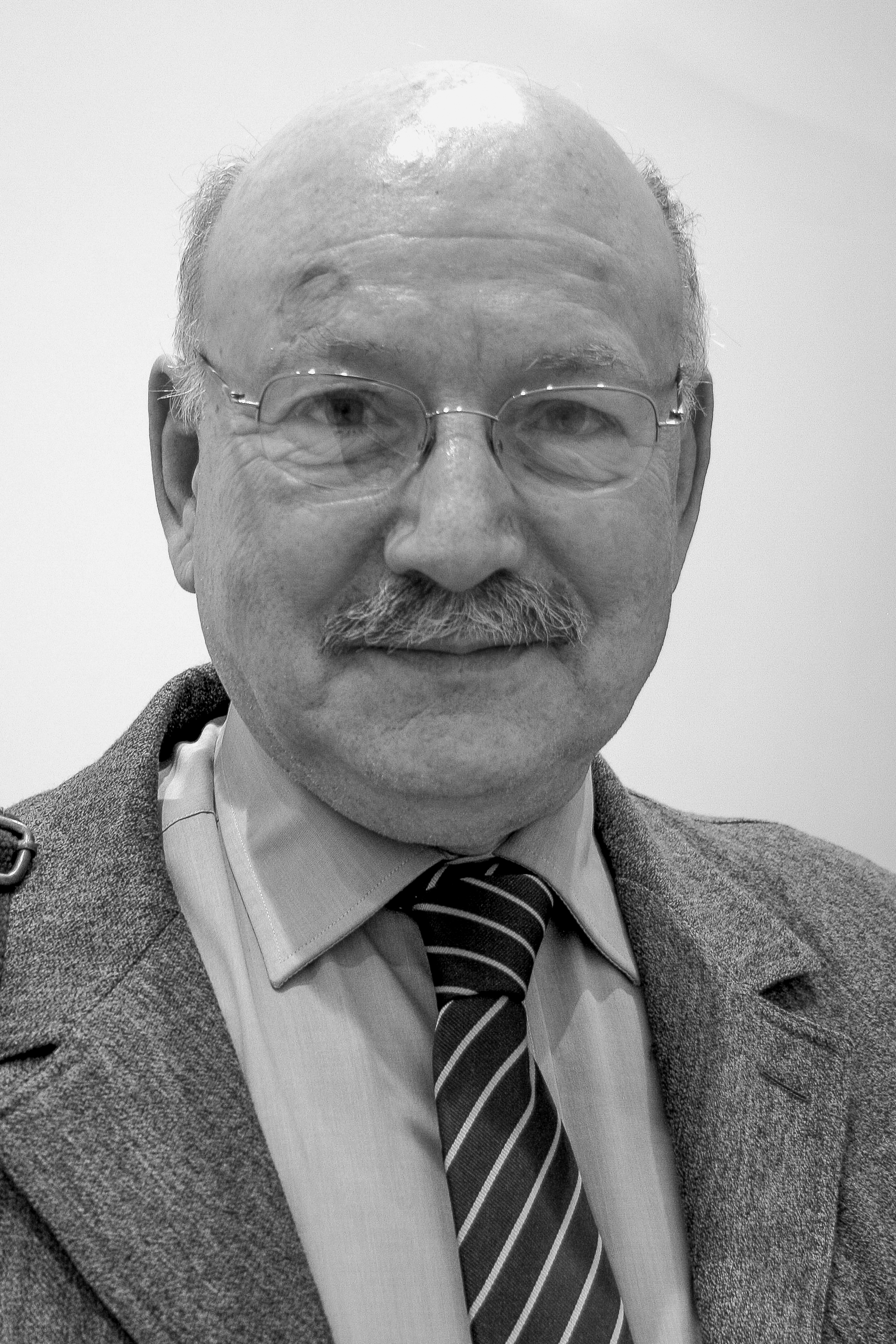
- Rioux in 2012
- Born: 15 February 1939; Clichy, Hauts-de-Seine, France
- Died: 6 December 2024 (aged 85)
- Occupation: Historian
- Political party: MoDem
- Spouse: Hélène Rioux
- Children: Rémy Rioux

Jean-Pierre Rioux (15 February 1939 – 6 December 2024) was a French historian. A member of the Democratic Movement, he was director of research at the Institut d'histoire du temps présent from 1980 to 1991.

Rioux was a recipient of the Legion of Honour (2000) and the Ordre national du Mérite (2011).

Rioux died on 6 December 2024, at the age of 85.
