= Finance in Common =

Network of public development banks

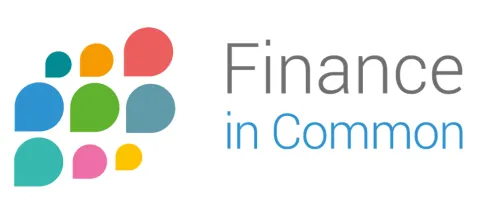
- Nickname: FiCS
- Type: Network
- Location: Paris, France
- Fields: Development cooperation, multilateralism, international financial institutions, international conferences
- Leader: Rémy Rioux
- Website: https://financeincommon.org/

Finance in Common (FiCS) is an international initiative founded in 2020 that brings together public development banks around common goals related to sustainable development, the fight against climate change, and the reduction of inequalities. The organizations have met annually since 2020 at a dedicated summit. The network now brings together more than 544 financial institutions representing nearly USD 2.5 trillion in annual investments.

== History ==
The Finance in Common network was established in 2020 through the union of public development banks.

The first Finance in Common Summit was launched in 2020 at the initiative of the French Development Agency (AFD) and its CEO Rémy Rioux, with the aim of providing a coordinated response to the crisis caused by the COVID-19 pandemic and defining a common investment framework aligned with the Sustainable Development Goals (SDGs) and the Paris Agreement.

This first edition brought together online 450 national and international public development banks, collectively representing more than USD 2 trillion in annual investments. It resulted in an eight-page joint declaration signed by part of the participants.

The second summit was organized in 2021 in Rome by Cassa Depositi e Prestiti and the International Fund for Agricultural Development, on the sidelines of the G20 Summit chaired by Italy.

The third summit took place in Abidjan in 2022, organized by the African Development Bank and the European Investment Bank, aiming to place on the agenda “not what banks want individually, but how they can serve the financial ecosystem.” It brought together 522 institutions from 154 countries and 900 participants.

The fourth summit, held in 2023 in Cartagena, focused on the role of public development banks in supporting micro and small enterprises in their transition toward sustainability, in line with the 2030 Agenda and the Paris Agreement. In the presence of the President of Colombia, it gathered representatives from 530 local, national, and regional development banks and led to the creation of a financial innovation lab to help public development banks in emerging markets mobilize private capital and expand their climate financing.

The fifth summit took place in 2025 in Cape Town. Organized among others by the French Development Agency, it aimed to “promote infrastructure and finance for fair and sustainable growth” and welcomed 2,000 participants.

== List of summits ==
No.	Date	Host city	Country
1	9–12 November 2020	Paris	France
2	19–20 October 2021	Rome	Italy
3	18–20 October 2022	Abidjan	Ivory Coast
4	4–6 September 2023	Cartagena	Colombia
5	26–28 February 2025	Cape Town	South Africa

== International reactions ==
Ahead of the first summit, NGOs and civil society organizations called for strong measures, such as ending the financing of fossil fuels and increasing funding for a just transition. They considered the final declaration vague on these issues. Patrice Fonlladosa, president of the think tank (Re)sources, praised the search for new solutions responding to local or national needs rather than transferring pre-existing models, as well as the gradual fading of the notion of “development.”
