= Róbert Ragnar Spanó =

Icelandic-Italian jurist and judge

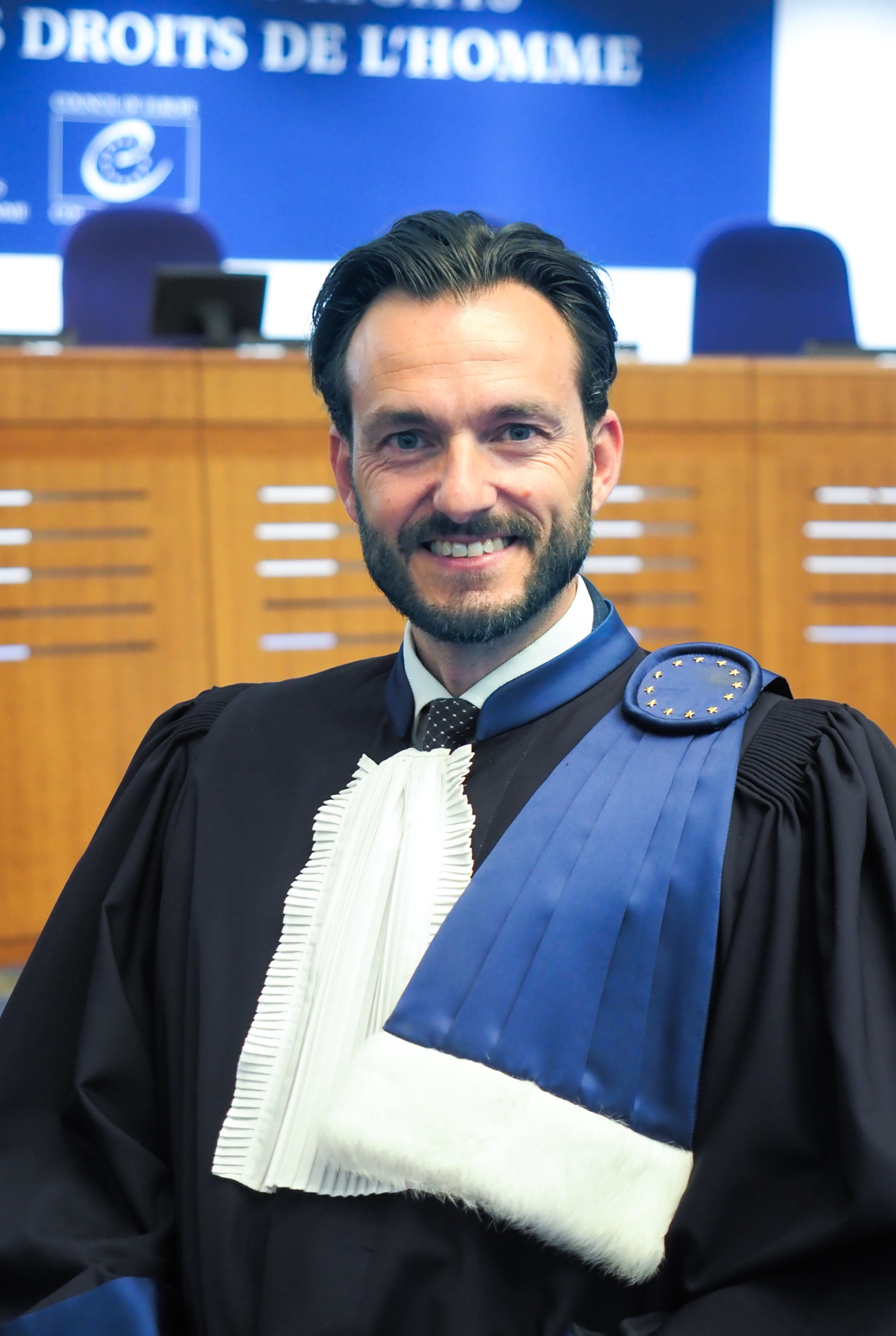
- Official portrait, 2020

President of the European Court of Human Rights
- In office 17 May 2020 – 1 November 2022
- Preceded by: Linos-Alexandre Sicilianos
- Succeeded by: Síofra O'Leary

Personal details
- Born: 27 August 1972 (age 54) Reykjavík, Iceland
- Education: University of Oxford; University of Iceland

Róbert Ragnar Spanó (born 27 August 1972) is an Icelandic-Italian jurist, judge, and former president of the European Court of Human Rights. He has been a partner at the multinational law firm of Gibson, Dunn & Crutcher since the end of this tenure as president of the court in October 2022. He started his tenure as president of the court on 18 May 2020, succeeding Judge Sicilianos from Greece. Before beginning his service on the court on 1 November 2013, he served provisionally as parliamentary ombudsman of Iceland and dean of the Faculty of Law, University of Iceland. Spano's mandate as a judge and president of the court ended on 31 October 2022 when he was succeeded by Judge Siofra O'Leary.

== Early life and education ==
Róbert was born in Reykjavík on 27 August 1972. He graduated with a Candidatus Juris degree from the University of Iceland in 1997 and a Magister Juris degree with distinction in European and comparative law from the University of Oxford (University College) in 2000. At Oxford, he was awarded the Clifford Chance Prize (proxime accessit) and the Civil Procedure Prize for his scholastic achievements.

== Professional career ==
Róbert began his legal career as a deputy judge at national level. He then became a legal adviser and special assistant to the parliamentary ombudsman, subsequently a tenured professor of law and dean of the faculty of law, University of Iceland between 2010 and 2013. He was provisionally appointed Parliamentary Ombudsman in 2013 before being elected a judge to the European Court of Human Rights.

== European Court of Human Rights ==
In November 2013 he was elected a judge to the European Court of Human Rights, serving as its vice president from 2019 to 2020 and its president between 2020 and 2022. Upon leaving the Court his colleagues published a Liber Amicorum in his honour stating that ‘during his term as president he demonstrated exceptional leadership qualities, showing creativity and imagination in improving the functioning of the Strasbourg institution”.

He was succeeded as judge with respect to Iceland by Oddný Mjöll Arnardóttir on 15 March 2023.

=== Visit to Turkey ===
After Róbert's visited Turkey in September 2020 and received an honorary doctorate from the Istanbul University as the president of the European Court of Human Rights, he received criticism that the act would conflict with the court's stance and principles. Others came to Róbert's defence, arguing that Róbert had used the freedom of speech that his position guarantees to him, in a country that much suffers, to give courage to those who deserve to receive a free and fair message. Thus, the court, through its president, had played its proper role for European liberties and democracy.

Mehmet Altan, a journalist and an academic discharged from Istanbul University by a statutory decree and released after 2 years of imprisonment, addressed an open letter to the ECtHR president, writing, "Those who will give you an honorary doctorate are the very people who dismissed me and many other academics." Başak Demirtaş, the wife of imprisoned Selahattin Demirtaş against the orders of the ECHR, invited Spano to visit also Diyarbakır after he has already met with Justice and Development Party officials in Mardin. To Mardin he travelled together with the Turkish judge of the ECtHR, Saadet Yüksel and posed for photographs together with the state appointed trustee who acts as a mayor instead of the elected but deposed Ahmet Türk of the Peoples' Democratic Party. Mardin is also hometown ECtHR judge Yüksel, who is the sister of Cüneyt Yüksel, a former member of the parliament from Erdogan's ruling Justice and Development Party.

=== Visit to Slovenia ===
In June 2021, Róbert was invited by Rajko Knez and Damijan Florjančič the presidents of the Constitutional Court and the Supreme Court to Slovenia. On the 24 June, he also met with president Borut Pahor.

== Gibson, Dunn & Crutcher ==
Róbert's mandate as a judge and president of the court ended on 31 October 2022. On 2 January 2023, Róbert joined the leading US multinational law firm of Gibson, Dunn & Crutcher and is a partner in the London and Paris offices. He is moreover a barrister before the Courts of England and Wales. He is the global co-chair of the artificial intelligence, geopolitical strategy and international law and ESG: risk, litigation and reporting, practice groups. He is among Europe's foremost thought leaders in these fields. Robert is listed in the 2025 edition of Best Lawyers in the United Kingdom as a leading lawyer for Human Rights and Public International Law. He is also named to Lawdragon’s 100 Leading AI & Legal Tech Advisors (2024-2025) and 500 Leading Global Cyber Lawyers lists (2024-2025).

Robert is a leading expert in geopolitical strategy and public international law, advising clients, including sovereign states and multinational companies, on treaty law, climate change litigation and regulation. In the field of EU law he litigates before the EU Courts on behalf of multinational companies in the tech sector and leads a team on regulatory compliance in the field of digital rights, online platform regulation and the intersection between artificial intelligence and fundamental rights. He is among Europe's foremost experts on the EU's Digital Services Act and the EU AI Act. He also advises clients on the law of the European Convention on Human Rights, principles of business and human rights (ESG, environment, social and governance) and governmental affairs and policy.

== Register of Damage for Ukraine ==
Robert was elected to the Board of the Register of Damage of Ukraine in November 2023, nominated by the Government of Iceland. The Register, established under the auspices of the Council of Europe, is tasked with collecting claims for damages, loss or injury caused by the Russian Federation's internationally wrongful acts resulting from its large scale invasion of Ukraine in February 2022. Robert leads the Board's work as its Chair.

== Writings ==
Róbert has written extrajudicially on the evolution of the convention system, the principle of subsidiarity and the rule of law, notably developing a theory on its "three-dimensional normative force" under the European Convention on Human Rights and Public International Law, the "organic dimension", the "functional dimension" and the "hybrid dimension". Furthermore, he is an acknowledged expert on international dispute resolution, business and human rights and in the field of digital rights and cyberspace.

== Personal life ==
Róbert is married and has four children, and as of May 2024, he resides in Paris and on the west side of Reykjavík.

Róbert is an avid singer and has won awards for his musical performances on stage. As of 2018, he was on a nine-year leave from the all-male choir Fóstbræður. He was a promising amateur bowler before he became a jurist. He won numerous competitions at home and internationally, both in individual and team tournaments.
