= Development Bank of Southern Africa =

Government finance company

- Type: Government-owned
- Industry: Finance
- Founded: 1983
- Headquarters: Johannesburg, South Africa
- Key people: Boitumelo Mosako (CEO) }}
- Products: Banking
- Net income: ▲ R R2.28bn
- Number of employees: 600
- Website: www.dbsa.org

The Development Bank of Southern Africa (DBSA) is a development finance institution wholly owned by the Government of South Africa. The bank intends to "accelerate sustainable socio-economic development in the Southern African Development Community (SADC) by driving financial and non-financial investments in the social and economic infrastructure sectors".

== History, mandate and vision ==
The Development Bank of Southern Africa is a South African development bank that focuses on promoting economic development and growth, It aims to improve the quality of life for individuals and facilitate regional integration through investments in infrastructure and development financing.

The DBSA's mandate emphasizes its role in facilitating developmental infrastructure in South Africa and other parts of Africa. The bank primarily targets the energy, water, transport and telecommunications sectors, while also addressing health and education as secondary areas of focus. The DBSA participates in various stages of the infrastructure development value chain, including project preparation, funding, implementation, and delivery.

The DBSA aims to support the development of a prosperous and integrated region that is resource-efficient and increasingly independent of poverty and dependency. The bank focuses on infrastructure development as a means to improve social and economic conditions. Additionally, it advocates for the sustainable management of limited resources.

Promoting regional integration through infrastructure is a crucial aspect of Africa's growth agenda, and the DBSA supports this objective. The bank participates in initiatives such as the South African Renewable Energy Independent Power Producer Procurement Programme (REIPPPP) and the Programme for Infrastructure Development in Africa (PIDA) Priority Action Plan.

Partnerships are crucial for the DBSA, and the bank has formed strategic relationships with both global and regional institutions, including the International Development Finance Club (IDFC), SADC's Development Finance Resource Centre (DFRC), the Association of African Development Finance Institutions (AADFI), and the World Economic Forum's Sustainable Development Investment Partnership (SDIP). The DBSA manages and implements funds that facilitate the preparation and development of infrastructure projects aimed at regional integration. It handles these responsibilities on behalf of national and international partners. Notable examples include managing SADC's Project Preparation Development Facility (PPDF) and the Infrastructure Investment Programme for South Africa (IIPSA) on behalf of the European Union.

The DBSA operates in alignment with various international, regional, and local policies, accords, and agreements to fulfill its mandate. The bank aligns with the United Nations’ Transforming our World: the 2030 Agenda for Sustainable Development, and is accredited by the Global Environment Facility and the Green Climate Fund. In line with the agreements from COP21, the DBSA also supports business innovation and aims to expand the emerging green economy.

== Projects ==
The DBSA supports the South African government in leveraging skills and capabilities to accelerate the implementation of infrastructure programmes in the key priority sectors of education, health and housing, as well as various municipal infrastructure programmes. DBSA has been collaborating with French DFI, AFD since 1994.

=== Municipal Infrastructure ===
The DBSA provides planning, financing and implementation support to municipalities in sectors that include water and sanitation, electricity, roads and houses.

Supported municipal programmes include Tshwane Rapid Transit and financing the Durban University of Technology (DUT) student village.

=== Economic Infrastructure ===
Economic or hard infrastructure is all infrastructure necessary for the functioning of a modern industrial nation. DBSA aims to address capacity and bottleneck constraints in order to optimise economic growth potential by supporting the following sectors:

- Bulk water
- Transportation/logistics
- Power/energy
- Telecommunications
- Liquid fuels (oil/gas)

Past projects include the !Ka Xu Concentrated Solar Power Project.

=== Social Infrastructure ===
Social or soft infrastructure is all the institutions which are required to maintain the economic, health, cultural and social standards of a nation or region. DBSA aims to address backlogs and expedite the delivery of essential social services in support of sustainable living conditions and improved quality of life within communities by supporting planning, financing and implementation support to non-municipal infrastructure projects including:

- Higher education
- Student accommodation
- Project implementation support for the construction and maintenance of houses, schools and health facilities

Past projects include emergency repairs and maintenance in health facilities in Limpopo, Masimong Hostel refurbishment Public-private partnership (PPP) and the Accelerated Schools Infrastructure Delivery Initiative.

=== Sustainability Projects ===
In 2024, DBSA established its biodiversity fund with an initial allocation of 50 million rand from the Green Fund, which was initially funded with 1.1 billion rand by the South African government’s environment department. The fund aims to enhance biodiversity, addressing the relatively slow pace of investment in this area compared to climate initiatives. DBSA plans to seek additional funding from entities like the Global Environment Facility and private investors to expand the fund's scope. This initiative aligns with DBSA's commitment to promoting environmental sustainability alongside economic growth through eco-conscious infrastructure projects. Additionally, DBSA issued a white paper to guide investors on incorporating biodiversity considerations into their financial strategies, underscoring the importance of environmental factors in investment decisions.
