= Síofra O'Leary =

Irish lawyer and former President of the European Court of Human Rights

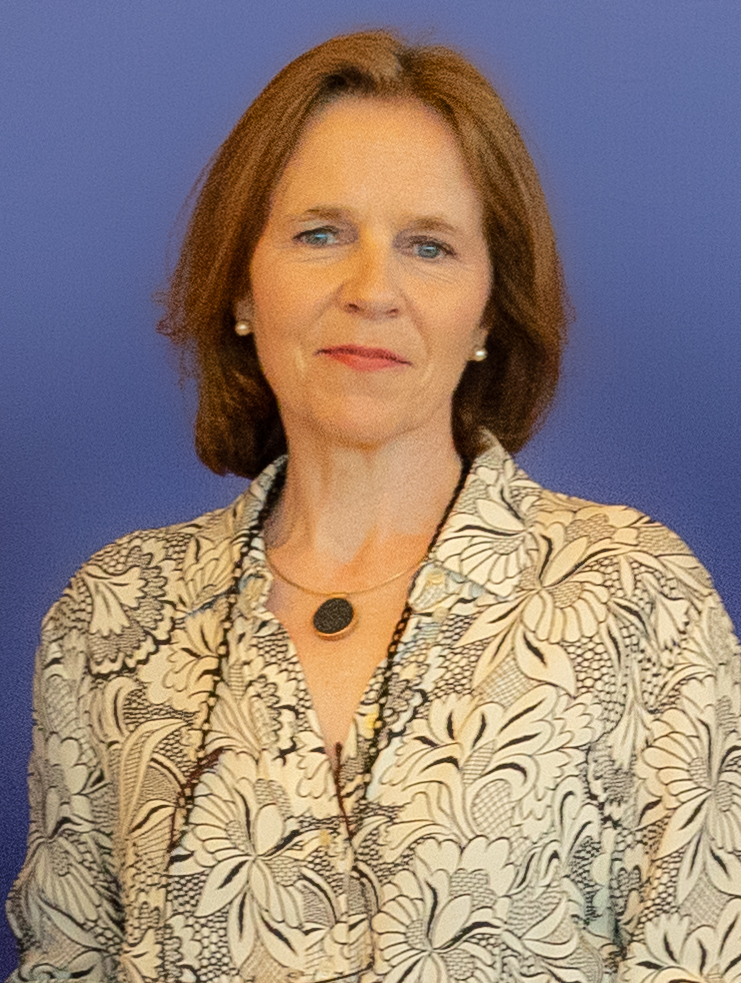
- O'Leary in 2022

President of the European Court of Human Rights
- In office 1 November 2022 – 2 July 2024
- Preceded by: Róbert Ragnar Spanó
- Succeeded by: Marko Bošnjak

Judge of the European Court of Human Rights
- In office 2 July 2015 – 1 July 2024
- Nominated by: Government of Ireland
- Appointed by: Council of Europe

Personal details
- Born: 20 September 1968 (age 58) Dublin, Ireland

Academic background
- Education: University College Dublin (BCL); European University Institute (PhD)
- Thesis: The evolving concept of Community citizenship: From the free movement of persons to Union citizenship (1993)
- Doctoral advisor: Hans Ulrich Jessurun d'Oliveira

Academic work
- Discipline: European Union law
- Institutions: Emmanuel College, Cambridge; Court of Justice of the European Union

Síofra O’Leary (born 20 September 1968) is an Irish lawyer and judge who served as president of the European Court of Human Rights from November 2022 to July 2024 and as a judge of the European Court of Human Rights since July 2015. She previously served as a vice-president of the European Court of Human Rights in 2022.

== Early life ==
O’Leary was born in Dublin where she completed a Bachelor of Civil Law degree at University College Dublin in 1989. She went on to study at the European University Institute in Florence, Italy, where she defended her PhD in European law, titled The evolving concept of Community citizenship : from the free movement of persons to union citizenship, in 1993.

== Academic career ==
O'Leary then worked in research at the Universities of Cadiz and London before going on to become assistant director in the Centre for European Law Studies at the University of Cambridge in 1996. O'Leary went on to become a Fellow at Emmanuel College there . Starting in 1996 for three years, O'Leary held the position of Référendaire (consultant) at the Court of Justice of the European Union in Luxembourg. She then became the "Chef de cabinet" from 2000 to 2004. During her time at the Court of Justice, O'Leary also was a visiting fellow at University College Dublin's faculty of law from 1999 to 2004. Since 2003, she has been a visiting professor at the College of Europe in Bruges. Her lectures address practitioners, government agencies and academics on fundamental rights, EU law and European Court of Justice practice and procedure. She writes articles on fundamental rights, EU employment law, the free movement of persons and services and EU citizenship.

== Judicial career ==
O'Leary held various positions at the Court of Justice of the European Union until April 2015 when she was elected to replace Ann Power as Ireland's judge at the European Court of Human Rights. Her term began on 2 July 2015 and is expected to end on 1 July 2024. From 1 January 2020, O'Leary has been President of the Section. On 15 November 2021 she was elected as the court's vice president. On 19 September 2022, she was elected president of the court and became the first woman to hold that position when she took up office on 1 November 2022 replacing Róbert Ragnar Spanó who is Icelandic.

In 2026 the Irish government nominated O'Leary as a judge at the European Court of Justice, succeeding Eugene Regan.

== Bibliography ==
- The Evolving Concept of Community Citizenship (Kluwer, 1996)
- Employment Law at the European Court of Justice (Hart Publishing, 2001)
