= President of the Republic =

Title used for heads of state or government in some republics

The President of the Republic is a title used for heads of state and/or heads of government in countries having a republican form of government.

== Designation ==
In most cases the president of a republic is elected, either:

- by direct universal suffrage (by all voters), or
- by indirect suffrage, or
- by a Parliament or one of its Chambers, or
- by an electoral college which may itself be designated.

== Africa ==
- Algeria: President of Algeria, President of the People's Democratic Republic of Algeria since 1963
- Angola: President of Angola, President of the Republic of Angola since 1975
- Benin: President of Benin, President of the Republic of Benin since 1960
- Botswana: President of Botswana, President of the Republic of Botswana since 1966
- Burkina Faso: President of Burkina Faso, President of the Republic of Burkina Faso since 1960
- Burundi: President of Burundi, President of the Republic of Burundi since 1966
- Cameroon: President of Cameroon, President of the Republic of Cameroon since 1960
- Cape Verde: President of Cape Verde, President of the Republic of Cape Verde since 1975
- Central African Republic: President of the Central African Republic since 1960, abolished in 1976 with the creation of the Central African Empire, restored in 1979
- Chad: President of Chad, President of the Republic of Chad since 1962
- Comoros: President of the Comoros, President of the Union of the Comoros since 1977
- Republic of the Congo: President of the Republic of the Congo since 1960
- Democratic Republic of the Congo: President of the Democratic Republic of the Congo since 1960
- Djibouti: President of Djibouti, President of the Republic of Djibouti since 1977
- Egypt: President of Egypt, President of the Arab Republic of Egypt since 1953
- Equatorial Guinea: President of Equatorial Guinea, President of the Republic of Equatorial Guinea since 1968
- Eritrea: President of Eritrea, President of the State of Eritrea since 1993
- Ethiopia: President of Ethiopia, President of the Federal Democratic Republic of Ethiopia since 1974
- Gabon: President of Gabon, President of the Gabonese Republic since 1960
- The Gambia: President of the Gambia, President of the Republic of The Gambia since 1970
- Ghana: President of Ghana, President of the Republic of Ghana since 1960
- Guinea: President of Guinea, President of the Republic of Guinea since 1958
- Guinea-Bissau: President of Guinea-Bissau, President of the Republic of Guinea-Bissau since 1973
- Ivory Coast: President of Ivory Coast, President of the Republic of Côte d'Ivoire since 1960
- Kenya: President of Kenya, President of the Republic of Kenya since 1964
- Liberia: President of Liberia, President of the Republic of Liberia since 1847
- Madagascar: President of Madagascar, President of the Republic of Madagascar since 1959
- Malawi: President of Malawi, President of the Republic of Malawi since 1966
- Mali: President of Mali, President of the Republic of Mali since 1965
- Mauritania: President of Mauritania, President of the Islamic Republic of Mauritania since 1961
- Mauritius: President of Mauritius, President of the Republic of Mauritius since 1992
- Mozambique: President of Mozambique, President of the Republic of Mozambique since 1975
- Namibia: President of Namibia, President of the Republic of Namibia since 1990
- Niger: President of Niger, President of the Republic of Niger since 1960
- Nigeria: President of Nigeria, President of the Federal Republic of Nigeria since 1963
- Rwanda: President of Rwanda, President of the Republic of Rwanda since 1961
- Sahrawi Arab Democratic Republic: President of the Sahrawi Arab Democratic Republic since 1982
- São Tomé and Príncipe: President of São Tomé and Príncipe, President of the Democratic Republic of São Tomé and Príncipe since 1975
- Senegal: President of Senegal, President of the Republic of Senegal since 1960
- Seychelles: President of Seychelles, President of the Republic of Seychelles since 1976
- Sierra Leone: President of Sierra Leone, President of the Republic of Sierra Leone since 1971
- Somalia: President of Somalia, President of the Federal Republic of Somalia since 1960
- Somaliland: President of Somaliland, President of the Republic of Somaliland since 1991
- South Africa: President of South Africa, President of the Republic of South Africa since 1994
- South Sudan: President of South Sudan, President of the Republic of South Sudan since 2011
- Sudan: President of Sudan, President of the Republic of Sudan since 1958
- Tanzania: President of Tanzania, President of the United Republic of Tanzania since 1964
- Togo: President of Togo, President of the Togolese Republic since 1960
- Tunisia: President of Tunisia, President of the Republic of Tunisia since 1957
- Uganda: President of Uganda, President of the Republic of Uganda since 1963
- Zambia: President of Zambia, President of the Republic of Zambia since 1964
- Zimbabwe: President of Zimbabwe, President of the Republic of Zimbabwe since 1980

== Americas ==
- Argentina: President of Argentina, Presidente de la Nación Argentina since 1826
- Barbados: President of Barbados, President of Barbados since 2021
- Bolivia: President of Bolivia, Presidente del Estado Plurinacional de Bolivia since 1825
- Brazil: President of Brazil, Presidente da República Federativa do Brasil since 1889
- Chile: President of Chile, Presidente de la República de Chile since 1826
- Colombia: President of Colombia, Presidente de la República de Colombia since 1819
- Costa Rica: President of Costa Rica, Presidente de la República de Costa Rica since 1848
- Cuba: President of Cuba, Presidente de la República de Cuba since 1902
- Dominica: President of Dominica, President of the Commonwealth of Dominica since 1978
- Dominican Republic: President of the Dominican Republic, Presidente de la República Dominicana since 1844
- Ecuador: President of Ecuador, Presidente de la República del Ecuador since 1830
- El Salvador: President of El Salvador, Presidente de la República de El Salvador since 1841
- Guatemala: President of Guatemala, Presidente de la República de Guatemala since 1839
- Guyana: President of Guyana, President of the Co-operative Republic of Guyana since 1980
- Haiti: President of Haiti, Président de la République d'Haïti (French), Prezidan peyi Repiblik Ayiti (Creole) since 1807
- Honduras: President of Honduras, Presidente de la República de Honduras since 1982
- Mexico: President of Mexico, Presidente de los Estados Unidos Mexicanos 1824 to 1864 and since 1867
- Nicaragua: President of Nicaragua, Presidente de la República de Nicaragua since 1854
- Panama: President of Panama, Presidente de la República de Panamá since 1904
- Paraguay: President of Paraguay, Presidente de la República del Paraguay since 1844
- Peru: President of Peru, presidente de la República del Perú since 1823
- Suriname: President of Suriname, President van de Republiek Suriname since 1975
- Trinidad and Tobago: President of Trinidad and Tobago, President of the Republic of Trinidad and Tobago since 1976
- United States of America: President of the United States of America since 1789
- Uruguay: President of Uruguay, Presidente de la República Oriental del Uruguay since 1830
- Venezuela: President of Venezuela, Presidente de la República Bolivariana de Venezuela since 1830

== Asia ==
- Bangladesh: President of Bangladesh, গণপ্রজাতন্ত্রী বাংলাদেশের রাষ্ট্রপতি (Bengali), President of the People's Republic of Bangladesh (English) since 1971
- China: President of China, 中华人民共和国主席, President of the People's Republic of China since 1954, abolished in 1975, restored in 1982
- East Timor: President of East Timor, Presidente da República Democrática de Timor-Leste or Prezidente Republika Demokratika Timor-Leste, President of the Democratic Republic of Timor-Leste since 2002
- India: President of India, भारत गणराज्य के राष्ट्रपति (Hindi), President of the Republic of India (English) since 1950
- Indonesia: President of Indonesia, Presiden Republik Indonesia since 1945
- Iran: President of Iran, رییس‌جمهور ایران Rayis Jomhur-e Irān (Persian) since 1980
- Iraq: President of Iraq, رئيس العراق Rayis aleiraq since 1958
- Israel: President of Israel, נשיא מדינת ישראל, President of the State of Israel since 1948
- Kazakhstan: President of Kazakhstan, Қазақстан Республикасының Президенті, Qazaqstan Respwblïkasınıñ Prezïdenti since 1990
- South Korea: President of South Korea, 대한민국 대통령, President of the Republic of Korea since 1948
- Kyrgyzstan: President of Kyrgyzstan, Кыргыз Республикасынын Президенти or Президент Киргизской Республики, President of the Kyrgyz Republic since 1990
- Laos: President of Laos, President of the Lao People's Democratic Republic since 1975
- Lebanon: President of Lebanon, رئيس الجمهورية اللبنانية Rayiys aljumhuriat allubnania since 1926
- Maldives: President of the Maldives 1953-54 and since 1968
- Mongolia: President of Mongolia, Монгол Улсын Ерөнхийлөгч, Mongol Ulsyn Yerönkhiilögch since 1990
- Myanmar: President of Myanmar, ပြည်ထောင်စု သမ္မတ မြန်မာနိုင်ငံတော်‌ သမ္မတ, President of the Republic of the Union of Myanmar since 1948
- Nepal: President of Nepal, संघीय लोकतान्त्रिक गणतन्त्र नेपालका अध्यक्ष, President of the Federal Democratic Republic of Nepal since 2008
- Pakistan: President of Pakistan, صدر اسلامی جمہوریہ پاکستان (Urdu), President of the Islamic Republic of Pakistan (English) since 1956
- Palestine: President of Palestine, رئيس دولة فلسطين Rayiys dawlat filastin since 1989
- Philippines: President of the Philippines, President of the Republic of the Philippines, "Pangulo ng Republika ng Pilipinas" (Filipino) since 1899
- Singapore: President of Singapore, President of the Republic of Singapore since 1965
- Sri Lanka: President of Sri Lanka, ශ්‍රී ලංකා ජනාධිපති (Sinhalese), இலங்கை சனாதிபதி (Tamil) since 1972
- Syria: President of Syria (رئيس سوريا, Raʾīs Sūriyā) (Arabic), since 1922; President of the Syrian Arab Republic (رئيس الجمهورية العربية السورية, Raʾīs al-Jumhūriyyah al-ʿArabiyyah as-Sūriyyah) (Arabic), from 1961 to 2024; restored in 2025.
- Taiwan: President of the Republic of China, 中華民國總統 since 1912
- Tajikistan: President of Tajikistan, Президенти Тоҷикистон or Президент Таджикистана, President of the Republic of Tajikistan since 1990
- Turkmenistan: President of Turkmenistan, Türkmenistanyň ministrler kabinetiniň prezidenti we başlygy (Turken), President and chairman of the Cabinet of Ministers of Turkmenistan (English) since 1990
- Uzbekistan: President of Uzbekistan, Oʻzbekiston Respublikasining Prezidenti since 1990
- Vietnam: President of Vietnam, President of the Socialist Republic of Vietnam since 1976, abolished in 1981, restored in 1992
- Yemen: President of Yemen, رئيس الجمهورية اليمنية Rayiys aljumhuriat alyamania since 1990

== Europe ==
- Albania: President of Albania, Presidenti i Shqipërisë since 1991
- Armenia: President of Armenia, Հայաստանի Հանրապետության նախագահ, President of the Republic of Armenia since 1991
- Austria: President of Austria, Bundespräsident der Republik Österreich since 1920
- Azerbaijan: President of Azerbaijan, President of the Republic of Azerbaijan since 1990
- Belarus: President of Belarus, Прэзідэнт Рэспублікі Беларусь or Президент Республики Беларусь (President of the Republic of Belarus) since 1994
- Bulgaria: President of Bulgaria, Президент на Република България since 1990
- Croatia: President of Croatia Predsjednik Republike Hrvatske since 1990
- Cyprus: President of Cyprus, Πρόεδρος της Κυπριακής Δημοκρατίας or Kıbrıs Cumhuriyeti Cumhurbaşkanı (President of the Republic of Cyprus, lit. 'President of the Cypriot Republic') since 1960
- Czech Republic: President of the Czech Republic, Prezident České republiky (President of the Czech Republic) since 1993
- Estonia: President of Estonia, Eesti Vabariigi President since 1992 (pre Soviet 1938 to 1940)
- Finland: President of Finland, tasavallan presidentti or republikens president since 1919
- France: President of the French Republic, Président de la République Française 1848-52 and since 1870
- Georgia: President of Georgia, საქართველოს პრეზიდენტი since 1991
- Germany: President of the Federal Republic of Germany, Bundespräsident der Bundesrepublik Deutschland (Federal President of the Federal Republic of Germany) 1949-90 for West Germany only, and since 1990 for all of Germany
- Greece: President of the Hellenic Republic, Πρόεδρος της Ελληνικής Δημοκρατίας (President of the Hellenic Republic) between 1924 and 1935, and since 1973
- Hungary: President of the Republic of Hungary, Köztársasági elnök (Hungarian) since 1989
- Iceland: President of Iceland, Forseti Íslands (Icelandic) since 1944
- Ireland: President of Ireland, Uachtarán na hÉireann (Irish) since 1938
- Italy: President of the Italian Republic, Presidente della Repubblica Italiana since 1948
- Kosovo: President of Kosovo, Presidenti i Republikës së Kosovës or Председник Републике Косова, President of the Republic of Kosovo since 2008
- Latvia: President of Latvia, Latvijas Valsts prezidents (Latvian), President of the Republic of Latvia since 1922
- Lithuania: President of Lithuania, Lietuvos Respublikos Prezidentas (Lithuanian), President of the Republic of Lithuania since 1919
- Malta: President of Malta, President tar-Repubblika ta' Malta (Maltese), President of the Republic of Malta (English) since 1974
- Moldova: President of Moldova, Președintele Republicii Moldova (Romanian), President of the Republic of Moldova since 1990
- Montenegro: President of Montenegro, Предсједник Црне Горе since 1990
- North Macedonia: President of North Macedonia, Претседател на Република Северна Македонија or Presidenti i Republikës së Maqedonisë së Veriut, President of the Republic of North Macedonia since 1991
- Northern Cyprus: President of Northern Cyprus Kuzey Kıbrıs Türk Cumhuriyeti Cumhurbaşkanı since 1983
- Poland: President of Poland, Prezydent Rzeczypospolitej Polskiej (President of the Republic of Poland) since 1922
- Portugal: President of the Portuguese Republic, Presidente da República Portuguesa since 1910
- Romania: President of Romania, Președintele României since 1990
- Russia: President of Russia, Президент Российской Федерации Prezident Rossiyskoy Federatsii since 1991
- Serbia: President of Serbia, Председник Републике Србије Predsednik Republike Srbije since 1945
- Slovakia: President of the Slovak Republic, Prezident Slovenskej republiky since 1993
- Slovenia: President of Slovenia, Predsednik Republike Slovenije since 1991
- Switzerland: President of Switzerland, President of the Swiss Confederation since 1848
- Turkey: President of Turkey, Türkiye Cumhuriyeti Cumhurbaşkanı (President of the Republic of Turkey) since 1923
- Ukraine: President of Ukraine, Президент України since 1991

== Oceania ==
- Fiji: President of Fiji, President of the Republic of Fiji since 1987
- French Polynesia: President of French Polynesia since 1984
- Kiribati: President of Kiribati, President of the Republic of Kiribati since 1979
- Marshall Islands: President of the Marshall Islands, President of the Republic of the Marshall Islands since 1979
- Micronesia: President of Micronesia, President of the Federated States of Micronesia since 1979
- Nauru: President of Nauru, President of the Republic of Nauru since 1968
- Palau: President of Palau, President of the Republic of Palau since 1981
- Vanuatu: President of Vanuatu, President of the Republic of Vanuatu since 1980

== See also ==
- Eternal President of the Republic
