= Carlo Monticelli =

Italian economist (born 1960)

Carlo Monticelli (born 9 September 1960) is an Italian economist and the Governor of the Council of Europe Development Bank since 18 December 2021, serving his first five-year term. He joined the CEB in 2015 as the Vice-Governor for Financial Strategy.

== Education ==
He studied in his hometown at the University of Genoa, where he graduated cum laude in Economics in 1983, and obtained a Master in Economics at the University of York in 1984. As graduate student, after having conducted post-graduate research in Monetary economics at the Brasenose College of the University of Oxford, he obtained his PhD in Economics at the University of Ancona in 1988.

== Career ==
He started his career at the Istituto Ligure di Ricerche Economiche e Sociali. In 1984 he became economist at the Research Department of the Bank of Italy, holding several positions until he became Deputy Director of the International Division, and later of the Monetary Division. He left the Italian central bank in 1999, to take office as the Head of European Economics at the Global Markets Research office of the Deutsche Bank in London.

In 2002, he returned to Rome as Director in the International Financial Relations Directorate of the Treasury Department, at the Italian Ministry of the Economy and Finance. From 2008 to 2015 he was the Director-General for International Financial Relations, and in this capacity he was also the ex-officio Alternate Governor for Italy at the World Bank, the Asian Development Bank, the African Development Bank, and the European Bank for Reconstruction and Development, as well as the Director for Italy at the Board of Directors of the European Investment Bank.
