= Council of Europe Development Bank =

International lending institution

Council of Europe Development Bank Banque de Développement du Conseil de l'Europe

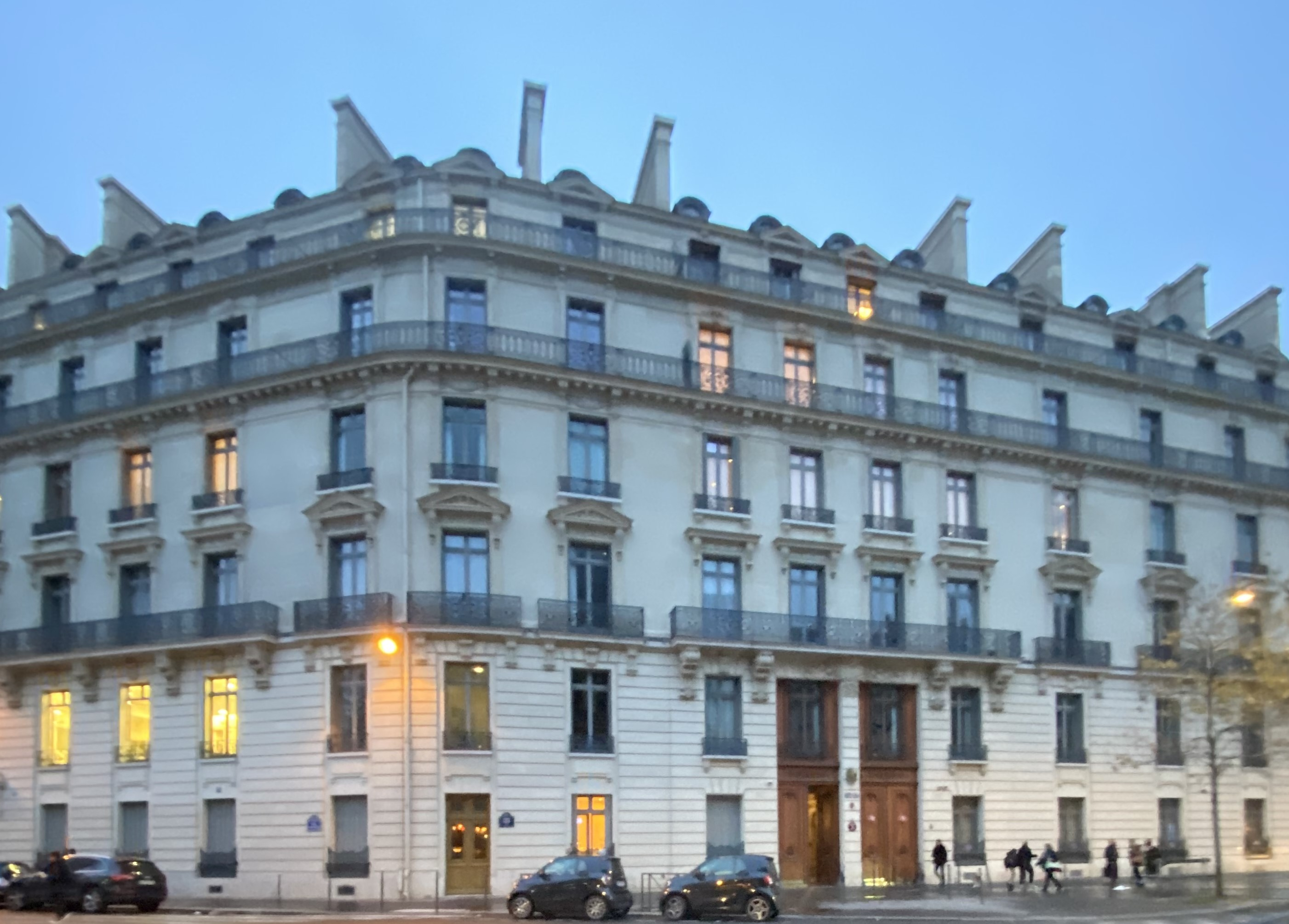
- Founded: 1956; 70 years ago
- Type: International financial institution
- Location: 55 avenue Kléber, Paris, France
- Members: 43 member states
- Governor: Carlo Monticelli
- Website: www.coebank.org
- Formerly called: Resettlement Fund for National Refugees and Over-Population in Europe

The Council of Europe Development Bank (CEB, French: Banque de Développement du Conseil de l'Europe) is a multilateral development bank, granting loans to member states to help disaster victims, help with job creation, and improve social infrastructure. As of 2020, its assets stood at 28 billion euros, which it uses to co-finance projects by means of loans of up to 40% of the project cost.

Its origins go back to 1956 when the Council of Europe created its Resettlement Fund for National Refugees and Over-Population in Europe (French: Fonds de rétablissement du Conseil de l'Europe pour les réfugiés), which was renamed as the Council of Europe Social Development Fund (French: Fonds de développement social du Conseil de l'Europe) in 1994 and eventually as the CEB in 1999. Since 1956, the bank has been headquartered at 55, avenue Kléber in Paris. It is a separate legal entity from the Council of Europe and is autonomous in its decision-making. It has a high credit rating from Moody's, Standard and Poor's and Fitch Ratings.

CEB formally uses both the French and English languages. English largely replaced French as internal working language in the 2010s.

== History ==
The CEB dates from 1956, when the Council of Europe established the Resettlement Fund for National Refugees and Over-Population in Europe as a Partial Agreement. In 1994, it changed its name to the Council of Europe Social Development Fund, before becoming the Council of Europe Development Bank in 1999.

The original aim was to help refugees and other displaced persons after the Second World War. It later expanded its scope of activities to include assistance to disaster victims, help with job creation, and improve social infrastructure. Its aim today is to promote social cohesion in its member states.

== Membership ==
Council of Europe Development Bank members: Member countries Member countries which aren't members of CoE Non-member CoE countries which are eligible for membership

As of April 2026 there are currently 43 member countries:

- Albania
- Andorra
- Belgium
- Bosnia and Herzegovina
- Bulgaria
- Croatia
- Cyprus
- Czech Republic
- Denmark
- Estonia
- Finland
- France
- Georgia
- Germany
- Greece
- Holy See
- Hungary
- Iceland
- Ireland
- Italy
- Kosovo
- Latvia
- Liechtenstein
- Lithuania
- Luxembourg
- North Macedonia
- Malta
- Moldova
- Montenegro
- Netherlands
- Norway
- Poland
- Portugal
- Romania
- San Marino
- Serbia
- Slovakia
- Slovenia
- Spain
- Sweden
- Switzerland
- Turkey
- Ukraine

All member countries except for the Holy See and Kosovo are also members of the Council of Europe. Five members of the Council of Europe, specifically Armenia, Austria, Azerbaijan, Monaco and the United Kingdom aren't members of the CEB but are eligible for membership.

== Governors ==
- Raphael Alomar (1999-2011), previously head of the Council of Europe Resettlement Fund (1993-1994) and Social Development Fund (1994-1999)
- Rolf Wenzel (2011-2021)
- Carlo Monticelli (from 2021)

== See also ==
- European Bank for Reconstruction and Development
- European Investment Bank
- European Stability Mechanism
- International Investment Bank
- Open Balkan
- Craiova Group
