= List of first women lawyers and judges in Europe =

== Albania ==
- Erifili Bezhani (1952): First Albanian female lawyer. She graduated and practiced law in France before being convicted by Albania's Communist Regime.
- Natasha Sheshi: First female to serve as a Judge of the Constitutional Court of Albania (1992)
- Flutura Kona: First (female) appointed as the State Attorney General of Albania (2001)
- Ina Rama (b. 1972): First female to serve as the Prosecutor General of Albania (2007–2012)
- Shpresa Beçaj: First female justice appointed as the Chief Justice of the Supreme Court of Albania (2008–2013)
- Erinda Ballanca: First female to serve as the Ombudsman for Albania (2017)
- Vitore Tusha: First female to serve as the President of the Constitutional Court of Albania (2019)

== Andorra ==
- Rosa Ferràndiz: First (female) notary in Andorra (1998)
- Sonia Artal Conesa (2013): First female lawyer of Spanish nationality to practice in Andorra
- Maria Teresa Armengol: First female to serve as a member of the Superior Council of Justice of Andorra (2005)
- Laurence Burgogue-Larsen: First female appointed as a Judge (2012) and President (2014) of the Constitutional Court of Andorra
- Canòlic Mingorance: First female elected in respect of Andorra to serve as a Judge of the European Court of Human Rights (2025)

== Austria ==
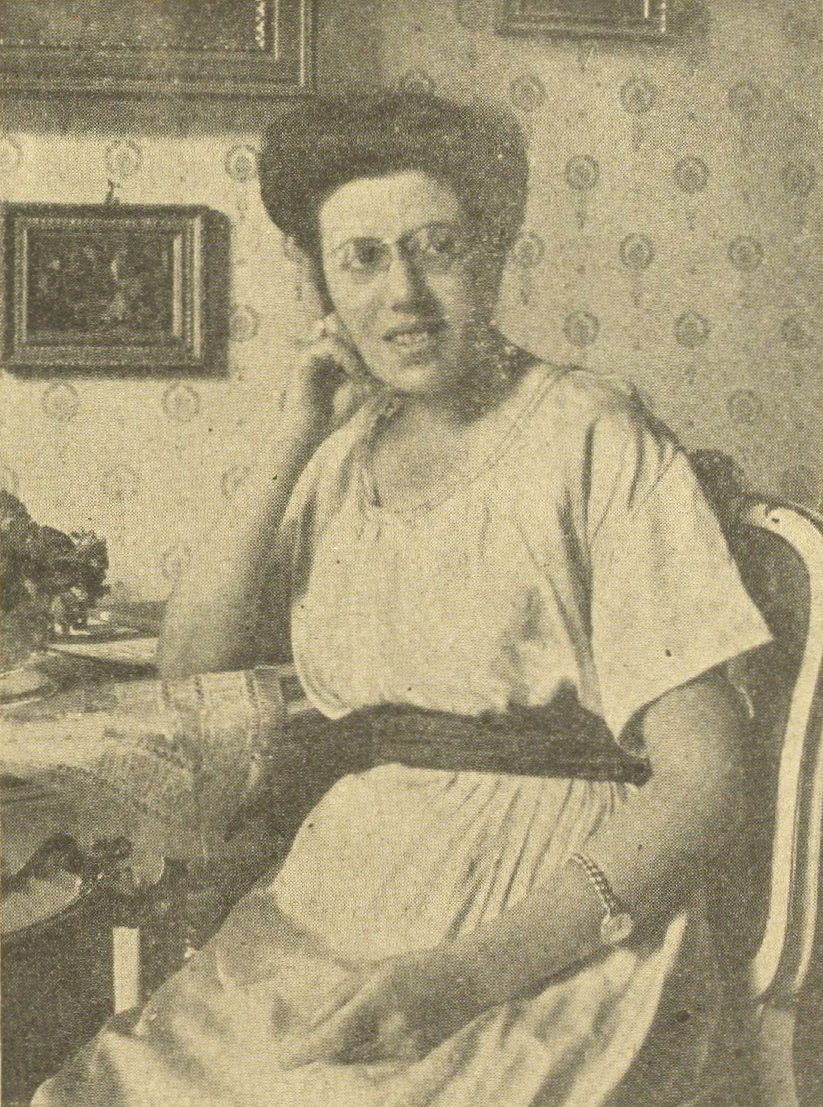
Marianne Beth: First female lawyer in Austria (1922)

- Marianne Beth (1928): First female to earn a law degree (1921) and become a lawyer in Austria
- Johanna Kundmann and Gertrude Jaklin (née Sollinger): First female judges in Austria (1947)
- Margarete Haimberger-Tanzer: First female to serve as a criminal judge in Austria (1950)
- Gerda Meissl: First female prosecutor in Austria (upon becoming a public prosecutor in Vienna in 1951)
- Ingrid Petrik: First female to serve as a Justice of the Supreme Administrative Court of Austria (1986) and serve as its Vice President (1986) and President (1988)
- Ilse Kellner: First female to serve as a Justice of the Supreme Court of Austria (1987)
- Lisbeth Lass: First female appointed as a Judge of the Constitutional Court of Austria (1994)
- Christine Stix-Hackl: First Austrian (female) to serve as the Advocate General of the European Court of Justice (2000)
- Maria Berger: First Austrian female to serve as a Judge of the European Court of Justice (2003)
- Birgit Langer: First female to serve as the Vice President of the Supreme Court of Austria (2005)
- Irmgard Griss: First female to serve as the President of the Supreme Court of Austria (2007–2011)
- Brigitte Bierlein: First female to serve as the Advocate General in the Procurator's Office at the Supreme Court (1990), Vice-President (2002) and President of the Constitutional Court of Austria (2018)
- Margit Kraker: First female to serve as President of the Court of Auditors of Austria (2016)
- Margit Wachberger: First female to serve as the Head of the General Procuratorate of Austria (2023)

== Belarus ==
- Olga Filippovna Sukhanova: First female to serve as the Chairperson of the Supreme Court of the BSSR (1936)
- Isabella Martsinovich: First female to earn a Doctor of Laws (1969) and become a law professor (1971) in Belarus
- Lilia Vlasova and Natalia Kozyrenko: First female lawyers to establish a private law practice in post-Soviet Belarus (1990)
- Valentina Ivanovna Miroshnik: First Belarusian female to serve as a Judge of the Economic Court of the Commonwealth of Independent States (1992)
- Rimma Ivanovna Filipchik, Podgrusha Valentina Vasilyevna, and Kenik (Khoma) Ksenia Ivanovna: First females to serve as Judges of the Constitutional Court of Belarus (1994)
- Natalia Iosifovna Andreichik: First female to serve as the President of the Belarusian Republican Bar Association (1997)
- Olga Gennadyevna Sergeeva: First female to serve as the Deputy Chairperson of the Constitutional Court of Belarus (2012)

== Belgium ==
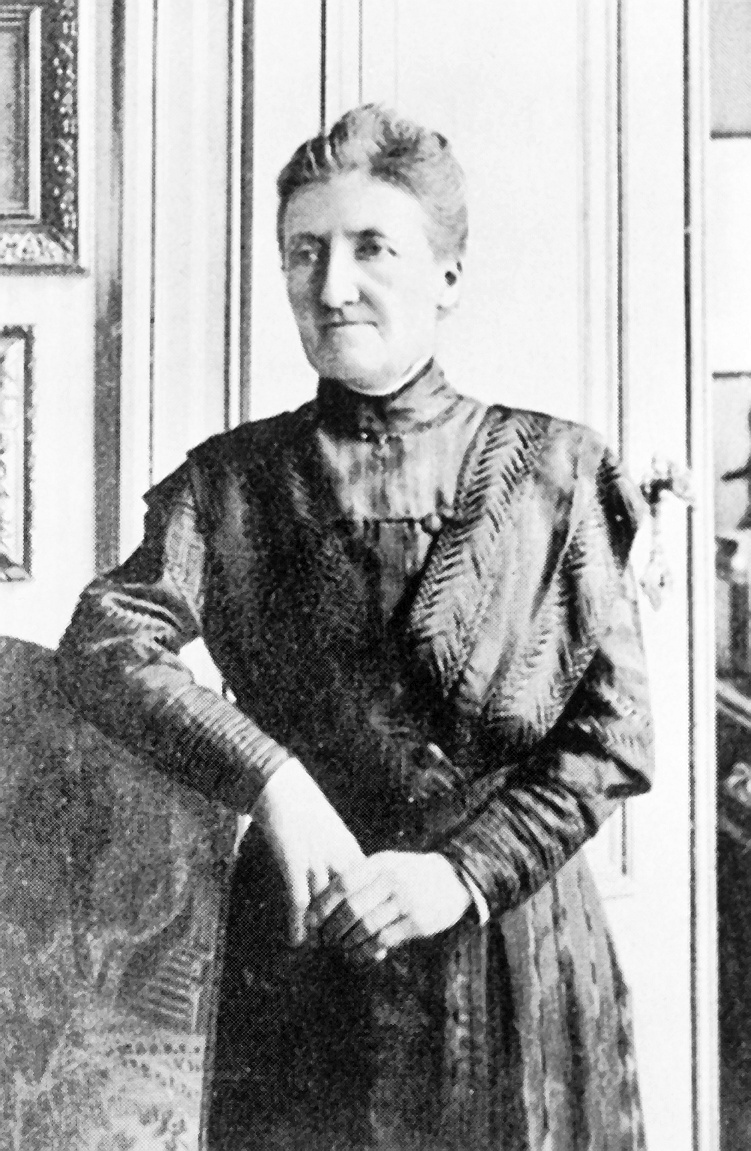
Marie Popelin: First female to earn a doctorate in law in Belgium (1888)

- Marie Popelin: First female to earn a doctorate in law in Belgium in 1888, but denied the right to practice as a lawyer
- Paule Lemy and Marcelle Renson (1922): The first women who took the oath of lawyer in Belgium
- Geneviève Janssen-Pevtschin (1937): First female judge in Belgium (upon her appointment as a Judge of the Brussels Court of First Instance in 1948)
- Odette Virlée-Leclef: First female to serve as the Chairperson of a Bar Association in Belgium (upon becoming the Chairperson of the Dinant Bar in 1968)
- Lucie Deltour: First female to serve as the president of a Belgian court (1977)
- Cecile Draps: First female appointed as a lawyer at the Court of Cassation of Belgium (1980)
- Irène Pétry: First female to serve as a Judge (1984) and President (1991) of the Court of Arbitration of Belgium (Francophone Group) [renamed as the Constitutional Court of Belgium in 2007]
- Anne Thily: First female appointed as an Attorney General for a Belgian Court of Appeal (upon her appointment to the Liège Court of Appeal in 1996)
- Beatrijs Deconinck: First female justice to serve as the First President of the Court of Cassation of Belgium (2019)
- Hilde François: First female to serve as the Senior President of the Court of Audit of Belgium (2023)
- Ann Fransen: First female federal prosecutor in Belgium (2024)

== Bosnia and Herzegovina ==
- Mira Gavrilović: First female lawyer and judge in Bosnia and Herzegovina when the country was part of Yugoslavia
- Azra Omeragić: First female to serve as a Judge of the Constitutional Court of Bosnia and Herzegovina in the post-Dayton period (1998)
- Meddžida Kreso: First female to serve as a Judge and President of the Court of Bosnia and Herzegovina (2004)
- Ljiljana Mijović: First female in respect of Bosnia to serve as a Judge of the European Court of Human Rights (2004)
- Amila Kunosić-Ferizović: First female to serve as the President of the Bar Association of the Federation of Bosnia and Herzegovina (2008)
- Gordana Tadić: First female to serve as the Chief State Prosecutor of Bosnia and Herzegovina (2019)

== Bulgaria ==
- Vera Zlatareva (1945): First female lawyer in Bulgaria
- Neviana Hristova: First female lawyer to become a prosecutor in Bulgaria (1953)
- Milena Zhabinska: First female to serve as a Judge of Constitutional Court of the Republic of Bulgaria (1991–1994)
- Yordanka Hadzhineva: First female to serve as a member of the Supreme Judicial Council of Bulgaria (1991)
- Snezhana Botusharova: First female elected in respect of Bulgaria to serve as a Judge of the European Court of Human Rights (1998–2008)
- Anya Dimova: First female appointed as the Appellate Prosecutor of the Supreme Judicial Council of Bulgaria (2004)
- Daniela Dokovska: First female to serve as the President of the Supreme Bar Council of Bulgaria (2008)
- Tsanka Tsankova: First female to serve as the Acting Chair of the Constitutional Court of Bulgaria (2012–2013)
- Maya Manolova: First female to serve as the Ombudsman for Bulgaria (2015)
- Pavlina Panova: First female to serve as the Chair of the Constitutional Court of Bulgaria (2021)
- Galina Zaharova: First female to serve as the Chairperson of the Supreme Court of Cassation of Bulgaria (2022)

== Croatia ==
- Mara Ilić (1929): First female lawyer in Croatia
- Miroslava Vekić and Erika Kocijančić: First females to serve as Judges of the Supreme Court of Croatia upon the court's creation in 1990
- Nina Vajić: First female in respect of Croatia to serve as a Judge of the European Court of Human Rights (1998)
- Emilija Rajić (1973) and Jasna Omejec (1985): First females to serve as Judges of the Constitutional Court of Croatia (1999)
- Jasna Omejec (1985): First female to serve as the Constitutional Court of Croatia's President (2008–2016)
- Branka Ćiraković: First female to serve as the Acting President of the High Commercial Court of the Republic of Croatia (2008)
- Tamara Laptoš: First female to serve as the Director of the Office for the Suppression of Corruption and Organized Crime (a specialized body within the State's Attorney Office of the Republic of Croatia; 2014)
- Zlata Hrvoj-Šipek: First female to serve as the Attorney General of the State's Attorney Office of the Republic of Croatia (2020)
- Tamara Capeta: First Croatian (female) to serve as the Advocate General of the European Court of Justice (2023)
- Iva Markotić Bagarić: First female to serve as the President of the Croatian Bar Association (2024)

== Cyprus ==
- Stella Soulioti (1951): First female lawyer in Cyprus. She later became the first female Law Commissioner (1971) and Attorney General of Cyprus (1984).
- Gönül Başaran Erönen (1975): First female judge in Cyprus (upon her appointment as a Judge of the District Court of Cyprus in 1980)
- Ermioni Markidou: First female lawyer to run to become President of the Cyprus Bar Association (1985)
- Efi Papadopoulou (1970): First female appointed as a Justice of the Supreme Court of Cyprus (2004)
- Persephone Panagi: First female to serve as the President of the Supreme Court of Cyprus (2020)

=== Northern Cyprus ===
- Shefika Hassan Hilmi Durduran (c. 1970s): First Turkish Cypriot woman to have registered to practice law in Northern Cyprus
- Gönül Başaran Erönen (1975): First female appointed as a Justice of the Northern Cyprus Supreme Court (1994)
- Emine Dizdarlı: First female Ombudsman of Northern Cyprus (2015)
- Narin Ferdi Şefik: First female to serve as the President of the Northern Cyprus Supreme Court (2015)

== Czech Republic ==
- Anděla Kozáková-Jírová: First female to obtain a legal diploma in the Czech Republic in 1923. She became the country's first female notary in 1928.
- Matylda Mocová-Wíchová (1928): First female lawyer in the Czech Republic
- Zdeňka Patschová: First female judge in the 1930s when the country was a part of Czechoslovakia
- Viera Strážnická: First female to serve as a Judge of the Constitutional Court of the Czech and Slovak Federal Republic (1991–1992)
- Iva Brozova, Eva Zarembová, and Ivana Janů: First females appointed as Judges of the Constitutional Court of the Czech Republic respectively (1993)
- Ivana Janů: First female to serve as the Vice President of the Constitutional Court of the Czech Republic. In 2001, Janu became the first Czech (female) appointed as an ad litem judge for the International Criminal Tribunal for the former Yugoslavia.
- Kateřina Hornochová: First female to serve as a Judge of the Supreme Court of the Czech Republic when the court was restructured in 1993
- Bohumíra Kopečná: First female to serve as the Supreme Public Prosecutor of the Czech Republic (1994)
- Eliška Wagnerová: First female to serve as the President of the Constitutional Court of the Czech Republic (1998-2002)
- Michaela Bejčková, Miluše Došková, Lenka Kaniová, Lenka Matyášová, Milada Tomková, Eliška Cihlářová, Brigita Chrastilová, Dagmar Nygrínová, Marie Souckova, Marie Turkova, Ludmila Valentová and Marie Žišková: First females to serve as Judges of the Supreme Administrative Court of the Czech Republic (2003)
- Monika Novotná: First female to serve as the Vice-President of the Czech Bar Association (2019)
- Kateřina Šimáčková: First female in respect of the Czech Republic to serve as a Judge of the European Court of Human Rights (2021)

== Denmark ==
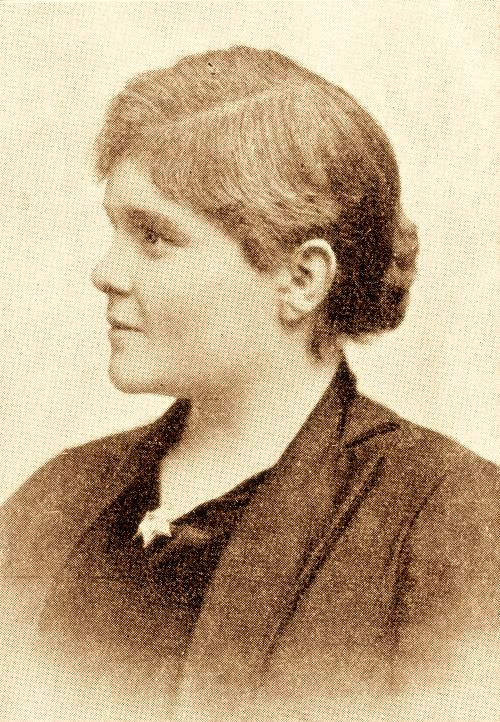
Nanna Kristensen-Randers: First female to obtain a legal diploma in Denmark (1887)

- Nanna Kristensen-Randers: First female to obtain a legal diploma in Denmark in 1887
- Henny Magnussen (1909): First woman to be permitted to work in the high courts of Denmark. Nanna Kristensen-Randers, who received a legal diploma in 1887, was not authorized to work in the country's high courts but was restricted to the lower courts.
- Elisa Ussing (1909): First female temporarily appointed as a Judge in the Østre Landsret (One of the high courts of Denmark; 1933). She was officially appointed to the aforementioned court in 1939.
- Ragnhild Fabricius Gjellerup: First female judge in Denmark (1934)
- Ingeborg Hansen: First female lawyer to practice before the Supreme Court of Denmark (1943)
- Bodil Dybdal: First woman appointed as a Justice of the Supreme Court of Denmark (1953)
- Helga Pedersen (1936): First female appointed as a Judge of the Strasbourg Human Rights Court (1971)
- Sys Rovsing Koch: First female to serve as the Chairperson of the Danish Bar Association (2003)
- Mette Lyster Knudsen: First female to serve as the Chairperson of the Danish Judges’ Association (2024)

=== Faroe Islands ===
- Marita Petersen is referred to as the first female lawyer in the Faroe Islands by various sources. She may have actually been a lagman or lawspeaker, which is a Scandinavian legal office.

== Estonia ==
- Ilse Zimmermann: First female to graduate with a law degree in Estonia in 1922
- Margot Viirmann-Kanemägi: First female member of the Estonian Bar Association (1924), though she was not officially registered as a lawyer until 1932
- Auguste Susi-Tannebaum and Olli Olesk: First females to apply for judicial positions, but were ultimately rejected (1924–1929)
- Hilda Reimann and Marta Kurfeldt (1930): First female lawyers in Estonia
- Lyubov Hütsi: First female to serve in a judicial capacity in Estonia (1936) [upon being elected as the Chairman of the Tartu Orphans' Court]
- Lea Kivi and Triinu Vernik: First females appointed as Judges of the Supreme Court of the Republic of Estonia (1993)
- Julia Laffranque: First female in respect of Estonia to serve as a Judge of the European Court of Human Rights (2011)
- Ülle Madise: First female to serve as the Chancellor of Justice (Estonia) (2015)
- Imbi Jürgen: First female to serve as the President of the Estonian Bar Association (2022)

== Finland ==
- Agnes Lundell (1911): First female to graduate with a law degree (1906) and become a lawyer in Finland
- Elsa Sohlstedt (1917) and Inkeri Harmaja (1917): First female lawyers to receive the honorary title varatuomari (deputy judge) in Finland [1929-1930]. In 1933, Harmaja became the first female to receive the title of vicehäradshövding (district notary) in Finland. Harmaja became the first female advisor of a Finland Court of Appeal in 1954.
- Inkeri Anttila (1942): First female doctor of law (1946) and first female professor of law in Finland (upon her appointment as Professor of Criminal Law at the University of Helsinki in 1961)
- Maarit Saarni-Rytkölä (1943): First female appointed as a Justice of the Supreme Court of Finland (1949)
- Lemmikki Kekomäki (1927): First female appointed as a Judge of the Supreme Administrative Court of Finland (1958)
- Ritva Hyöky (1944): First female appointed as a President of a Court of Appeal in Finland (upon her appointment to the Vaasa Court of Appeal in 1975)
- Pauliine Koskelo (1979): First female justice appointed as the President of the Supreme Court of Finland (2005)
- Päivi Hirvelä: First female in respect of Finland to serve as Judge of the European Court of Human Rights (2007)
- Raija Toiviainen: First female to serve as the Deputy Prosecutor General (2016–2018) and Prosecutor General (2018– ) of Finland
- Tuula Linna: First female to serve as President of the Finnish Bar Association (2019)

== France ==
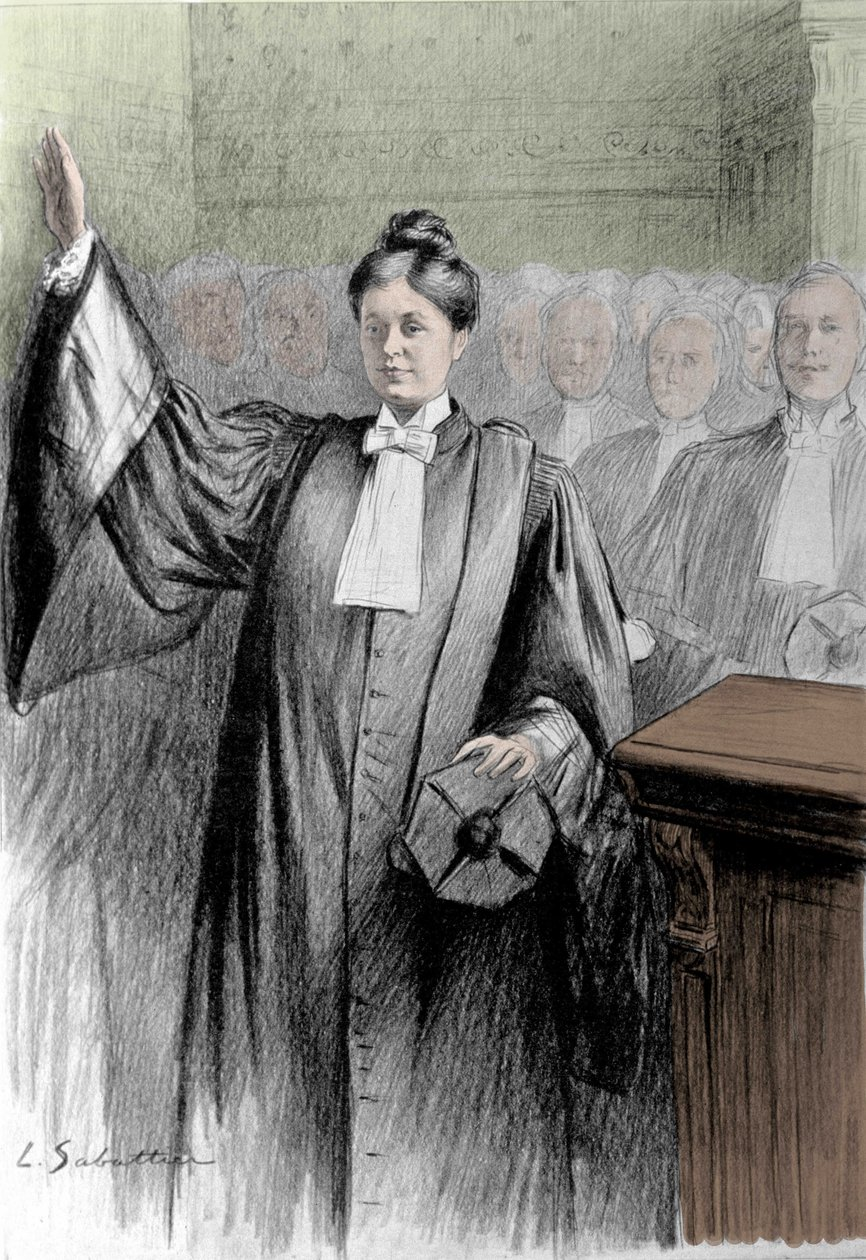
Jeanne Chauvin: First female lawyer to plead a case before the French court (1900)

- Victorie de Villirouët: First female to act as an attorney in court during the French Revolution (1798)
- Sarmiza Bilcescu: First female to graduate with a law degree in France in 1887
- Olga Petit and Jeanne Chauvin (1900): First female lawyers in France. Chauvin would be the first female lawyer to actually plead a case before the French court.
- Marguerite Dilhan (1903): Third female lawyer in France, the first to open her own firm and to plead before the Assize court in Toulouse.
- Maria Vérone (1906): First female lawyer to plead before the French assize court in Paris (1908).
- Mme. Valat: First female lawyer to plead a case before a French military court (1913)
- Paule Godinot: First female to serve as a Commissioner-in-waiting in France (1928)
- Paule-René Pignet: First female to serve as the president of a bar association in France (1933)
- Marguerite Haller and Charlotte Béquignon-Lagarde: First female judges in France (1946). They later became the first females to serve as President of the Conflict Court and preside over a French assize court respectively in France (1962 and 1964).
- Anne-Marie Gentily: First female assessor of a judge and judge at the Children's Court
- Jacqueline Bauchet and Louise Cadoux: First females to serve as members of the Council of State (France) (1953)
- Simone Veil: First female to serve as the Secretary General of the Supreme Council of Magistracy (1970)
- Marcelle Pipien: First female to serve as the President of an Administrative Court in France (1973)
- Marie-Thérèse Goutmann: First female to sit on the High Court of Justice of France (1974)
- Martine Luc-Thaler (1976): First female lawyer in the State Council and the Court of Cassation of France
- Suzanne Challe: First female to serve as the President of a Court of Appeal in France (1978)
- Suzanne Bastid: First female to sit among the members of the International Court of Justice for oral proceedings (1982)
- Simone Rozès (1945): First female justice appointed as the President of the Court of Cassation of France (1984–1988). In 1981, Rozes became the first female Advocate General of the European Court of Justice.
- Noëlle Lenoir: First female appointed as a Judge of the Constitutional Council of France (1992)
- Marie-Pierre Cordier: First female to serve as the Attorney General of the Court of Auditors of France (2012)
- Sarah Tournier: First female appointed as a Judge of the Commercial Court of France (2018)
- Christiane Féral-Schuhl: First female to serve as the President of the National Bar Council (2018–2020)

== Germany ==
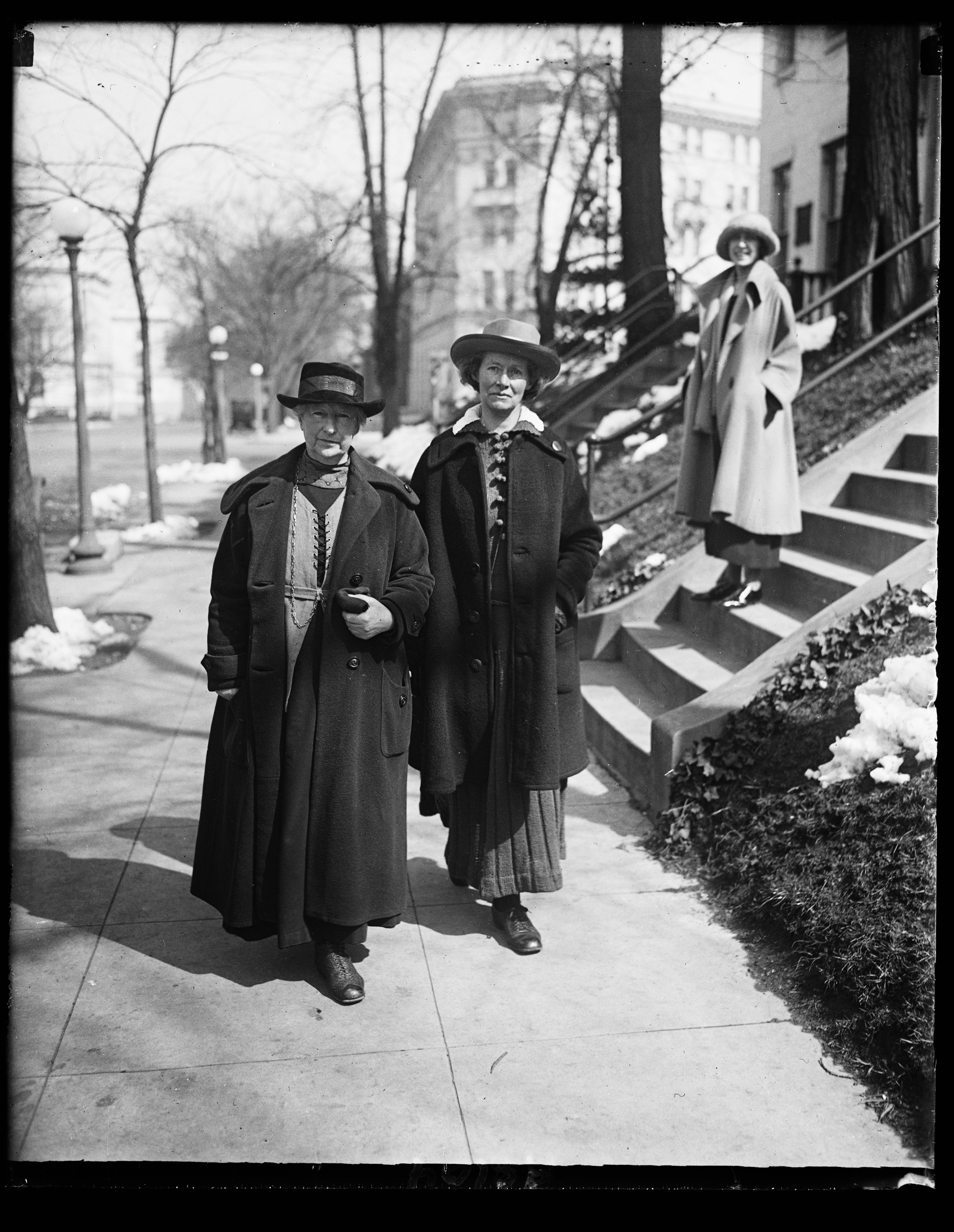
Anita Augsburg: First female to earn a law degree in Germany (1897)

- Anita Augsburg: First woman to earn her Doctor of Law in 1897 in Germany, though she was not allowed to practice law until after the law changed in 1922.
- Maria Otto (1922): First female lawyer in Germany
- Maria Hagemeyer (1924): First female judge in Germany (1927-1928) after having served as an Assessor in Prussia
- Erna Scheffler (1925): First female to serve as a Judge of the German Federal Constitutional Court (1951)
- Marion Yorck von Wartenburg: First female judge to preside over a jury trial in Germany (1952)
- Gisela Niemeyer (c. 1950s): First female appointed as a Justice of the Supreme Court of Finances in the German Federal Republic (1973) and Judge of the Federal Constitutional Court (1977)
- Elisabeth Steup: First female to serve as the President of the Federal Patent Court of Germany (1986)
- Jutta Limbach (c. 1962): First female appointed as the President of the Federal Constitutional Court of Germany (1994–2002)
- Iris Ebling: First female to serve as President of the Federal Finance Court of Germany (1999)
- Ninon Colneric: First female judge from Germany to sit on the European Court of Justice (2000)
- Juliane Kokott: First German (female) to serve as the Advocate General of the European Court of Justice (2003)
- Renate Jaeger: First female in respect of Germany to serve as a Judge of the European Court of Human Rights (2004)
- Ingrid Schmidt: First female to serve as President of the Federal Labour Court of Germany (2005)
- Monika Harms (c. 1970s): First female appointed as the Attorney General of Germany (2006-2011)
- Marion Eckertz-Höfer: First female to serve as President of the Federal Administrative Court of Germany (2007)
- Sabine Knierim: First German (female) to serve as a Judge of the United Nations Appeals Tribunal (2009)
- Bettina Limperg: First female to serve as the President of the Federal (Supreme) Court of Germany (2014)
- Ulrike Paul: First female to serve as a member of the BRAK Presidium (2015)
- Edith Kindermann (1992): First female lawyer to serve as the President of the German Bar Association (2019)

== Greece ==
- Efharis Petridou (1925): First female lawyer in Greece (upon registering with the Athens Bar Association)
- Penelope Athanasopoulou: First female judge in Greece [upon her appointment as a Judge of the Council of State (Supreme Administrative Court) of Greece in 1958]
- Anna Athanasiadou: First female areopagite in Greece (upon her appointment to the Supreme Civil and Criminal Court of Greece in 1980)
- Athanasia Tsampasi: First female to serve as Vice-President of the Council of State (Supreme Administrative Court) of Greece (2004)
- Rena Asimakopoulou (1969): First female to serve as President of the Supreme Civil and Criminal Court of Greece (2011)
- Eleni Diakomanoli: First female to serve as the General State Commissioner of the Administrative Courts of Greece (2011)
- Euterpi Koutzamani: First female appointed as the Prosecutor of the Supreme Civil and Criminal Court of Greece (2013)
- Aikaterini Sakellaropoulou: First female to serve as the President of the Council of State (Supreme Administrative Court) of Greece (2018)

== Hungary ==
- Ilonka Hajnal: First female to study law in Hungary (1913)
- Irén Svábyné (Priegl): First female to earn a Juris Doctor and become a lawyer candidate in Hungary (1925). She died before she could achieve her goal.
- Margit Ungár (1928): First female lawyer in Hungary [she practiced law in Budapest, Central Hungary]
- Magda Bernauer (1948): First female to pass the patent attorney exam and receive a patent attorney license in Hungary
- Istvánné Pomázi: First female judge in Hungary (c. 1948)
- Tersztyánszky Ödönné Vasadi Éva: First female appointed as a Judge of the Constitutional Court of Hungary (1999)

== Iceland ==
- Auður Auðuns (1935): First female lawyer in Iceland. She was also the first female to earn a law degree from the University of Iceland.
- Rannveig Þorsteinsdóttir: First female to practice law before the Supreme Court of Iceland (1959)
- Auður Þorbergsdóttir: First female judge in Iceland (1963)
- Guðrún Erlendsdóttir: First female appointed as a Judge of the Supreme Court of Iceland (c. 1986) and its President (c. 1991)
- Þórunn Guðmundsdóttir: First female to serve as the Chairperson of the Icelandic Bar Association (1995)
- Oddný Mjöll Arnardóttir: First female in respect of Iceland to serve as a Judge of the European Court of Human Rights (2023)

== Ireland ==
- Frances Kyle and Averil Deverell (1921): First female barristers admitted to the Irish Bar [Ireland]
- Mary Dorothea Heron and Helena Early (1923): First female solicitors in Ireland
- Frances Moran (1924): First female to take silk and become a senior counsel in Ireland (1941)
- Lady Arnott, Lady Redmond, Lady Dockrell, and Miss Palles: First women appointed as Justices of the Peace in Ireland (1920)
- Kathleen Butler Garret (1930): First American female admitted to the Irish Bar
- Eileen Kennedy (1947): First female judge in Ireland (1964)
- Moya Quinlan (1946): First female to serve as President of the Law Society of Ireland (1968)
- Susan Denham (1971): First female appointed as a Justice of the Supreme Court of Ireland (1992) and serve and its Chief Justice (2011–2017)
- Mella Carroll (1976; Northern Ireland Bar): First female appointed as a Judge of the High Court of Ireland (1980)
- Moya Quinlan: First female to serve as the President of the Law Society of Ireland (1980)
- Catherine McGuinness (1977): First female appointed as a Judge of the Circuit Court of Ireland (1994)
- Fidelma O’Kelly Macken: First (Irish) female to serve as a Judge of the European Court of Justice (1999)
- Katherine Delahunt-O'Byrnes (1979): First female solicitor appointed as a Judge of the Circuit Court of Ireland (2001)
- Maureen Harding Clark: First Irish (female) appointed as an ad litem judge for the International Criminal Tribunal for the former Yugoslavia (2001)
- Ann Power-Forde: First female in respect of Ireland to serve as a Judge of the European Court of Human Rights (2008)
- Claire Loftus: First female to serve as the Director of Public Prosecutions in Ireland (2011)
- Mary Faherty: First Irish (female) to serve as a Judge of the United Nations Appeals Tribunal (2011)
- Máire Whelan (1985) First female appointed as Attorney General (2011)
- Síofra O'Leary: First (Irish) female to serve as the President of the European Court of Human Rights (2022)

== Italy ==
- Giustina Rocca: First female to act as a lawyer in an Italian court (1500)
- Maria Pellegrina Amoretti: First Italian female to earn a law degree (1777)
- Lidia Poët (1883) and Teresa Labriola (1919): First female lawyers in Italy respectively
- Elisa Orsi Comani: First female lawyer in Italy to plead a case before a court (1919)
- Letizia De Martino, Ada Lepore, Maria Gabriella Luccioli, Graziana Calcagno Pini, Raffaella D'Antonio, Annunziata Izzo, Giulia De Marco and Emilia Capelli: First female judges in Italy (1965). Luccioli later became the first female President of the Chamber of Cassation of Italy (2008).
- Brigida Monte: First female to serve as a magistrate of the Court of Audit of Italy (1971)
- Fernanda Contri: First female to be appointed as a Judge of the Constitutional Court of Italy (1996) and serve as its Vice-President (2005)
- Lucia Serena Rossi: First Italian female to serve as a Judge of the Court of Justice of the European Union (2017)
- Marta Cartabia: First female to serve as the President of the Constitutional Court of Italy (2019)
- Maria Rosaria San Giorgio: First female elected by the Court of Cassation as a Judge of the Constitutional Court of Italy (2020)
- Margherita Cassano: First female to serve as the Vice-President (2020) and President (2023) of the Supreme Court of Cassation of Italy
- Ida Caracciolo: First Italian female to serve as Judge of the International Tribunal for the Law of the Sea (2020)
- Oana Andreea Mecleș: First Romanian (female) judge in Italy (2021)
- Maria Masi: First female to serve as the President of the National Bar Council of Italy [Consiglio Nazionale Forense] (2022)

== Kosovo ==
- Nekibe Kelmendi (1974): First female (of Albanian descent) lawyer in Kosovo
- Hadije Maloku-Begolli: First female judge in Kosovo (1974–1979)
- Bademe Siqani Sllamnikut: First female prosecutor in Kosovo
- Lirije Osmani: First female to serve as the President of the Kosovo Chamber of Advocates (2001)
- Gjyljeta Mushkolaj, Iliriana Islami, and Snezhana Botusharova: First females elected as Judges of the Constitutional Court of the Republic of Kosovo (2009)
- Arta Rama-Hajrizi: First female to serve as the President of the Constitutional Court of the Republic of Kosovo (2015)
- Ekaterina Trendafilova: First (female) President of the Kosovo Specialist Chambers (2017)

== Latvia ==
- Otīlija Ķempele: First female admitted as a sworn advocate's assistant (1922) and sworn advocate [lawyer] (1929) in Latvia
- Rozālija Purgale (1932): First female judge in Latvia (1933)
- Anita Ušacka, Ilmu Cepani, and Ilze Skultans: First females appointed as Judges of the Constitutional Court of Latvia (1996)
- Anita Ušacka: First Latvian (female) to serve as a Judge of the International Criminal Court (2003)
- Ineta Ziemele: First female in respect of Latvia to serve as a Judge of the European Court of Human Rights (2005) and European Court of Justice (2020)
- Aija Branta: First female to serve as the Chairperson of the Constitutional Court of Latvia (2014)
- Laila Medina: First Latvian (female) to serve as an Advocate General of the European Court of Justice (2022)

== Liechtenstein ==
- Elisabeth Fehr (née Lemière): First Liechtenstein female to earn a doctorate in law (1921)
- Gertrud Beck (1956): First female lawyer in Liechtenstein
- Marianne Marxer: First female lawyer employed by Liechtenstein's state administration (1966)
- Edith Frick, Brigette Feger, and Hilda Korner: First females to serve as Judges of the State (Constitutional) Court of the Principality of Liechtenstein (1979; 1985)

== Lithuania ==
- Liuda Vienožinskaitė-Purėnienė (1917): First female lawyer in Lithuania
- Elena Jackevičaitė: First female judge in Lithuania (1924)
- Teodora Staugaitienė: First female to serve as a Judge of the Constitutional Court of Lithuania (1993)
- Ona Aldona Budienė, Irena Stankevičienė, and Lidija Liucija Žilienė: First females appointed as Justices of the Supreme Court of Lithuania (1994)
- Janina Januškienė, Laima Garnelienė, Janina Stripeikienė and Violeta Ražinskaitė: First females appointed as Judges of the Lithuania Court of Appeal (1995)
- Danutė Jočienė: First female to serve as the President of the Constitutional Court of Lithuania (2021). In 2003, she became the first female in respect of Lithuania to serve on the European Court of Human Rights.
- Nida Grunskienė: First female to serve as the Prosecutor General of Lithuania (2021)
- Skirgailė Žalimienė: First female to serve as the President of the Supreme Administrative Court of Lithuania (2022)
- Dalia Foigt-Norvaišienė: First female to serve as the Chairperson of the Lithuanian Bar Association's Honorable Court of Advocates (2022)
- Danguolė Bublienė: First female to serve as the President of the Supreme Court of Lithuania (2023)

== Luxembourg ==
- Marguerite Welter (1923): First female admitted to the Luxembourg Bar, though she ultimately did not practice law
- Netty Probst (1927): First female lawyer to actually practice law in Luxembourg. She was also the first female to serve as the Bâtonnière of the Luxembourg Bar Association (1954–1956).
- Marthe Glesener: First female to apply to become a magistrate in Luxembourg, but was denied (1937)
- Anne-Marie Courte, Claire Peters and Jeanne Rouff: First females to serve as magistrates in Luxembourg (1961). Rouff later became the first female to serve as a state prosecutor in Luxembourg, as well as the first female President of the Chamber of the Court of Appeals of Luxembourg.
- Paulette Lenert: First female to serve as a judge and the Deputy Chairperson of the Administrative Court of Luxembourg (1997–2010)
- Chantal Arens: First French (female) magistrate to serve on the Luxembourg Court of Justice
- Martine Solovieff: First female appointed as the State Attorney General of Luxembourg (2015)

== Malta ==
- Joanna Digiorgio (1949): First female lawyer in Malta
- Lorraine Schembri Orland: First female elected to Chambers of Advocates of Malta (1986) and Judge of the European Court of Human Rights (2019)
- Jacqueline Padovani Grima: First female magistrate in Malta (1991)
- Ena Cremona (1959): First Maltese judge (and female) to serve on the European Court of First Instance in Luxembourg upon the country's accession to the European Union in 2004
- Abigail Lofaro and Anna Felice: First female judges in Malta (2006)
- Victoria Buttigieg: First female to serve as the Attorney General of Malta (2020)
- Ramona Frendo: First Maltese female to serve as a Judge of the European Court of Justice (2024)

== Moldova ==
- Eugenia Crușevan (1918): First female lawyer in Bessarabia, a geographical region corresponding up to a point with modern Moldova
- Elena Safaleru: First female to serve as a Judge of the Constitutional Court of Moldova (2001)
- Ala Popescu: First female to serve as the President of the Court of Accounts of Moldova (2005)
- Alina Ianucenco: First female (a lawyer and former judge) ombudsman for the Moldovan People's Advocate Office
- Domnica Manole: First female to serve as the President of the Constitutional Court of Moldova (2020)
- Diana Sârcu: First female in respect of Moldova to serve as a Judge of the European Court of Human Rights (2021)
- Veronica Dragalin: First female to serve as the Chief of the Anti-Corruption Prosecutor's Office of Moldova (2022)

=== Transnistria ===
- Ivanova Olga Dmitrievna and Valentina Nikolaevna Chebotar: First females to serve as the Chairperson and Deputy of the Supreme Court of the Pridnestrovian Moldavian Republic (PMR) respectively (1992)
- Maria Melnik: First female to serve as the Chairperson of the Arbitration Court of the Pridnestrovian Moldavian Republic (PMR) (2012)

== Monaco ==
- Laurence Aureglia (1959): First female lawyer in Monaco
- Hélène Marquilly (1967): First female defense lawyer in Monaco
- Ariane Picco-Margossian: First female magistrate in Monaco (upon her appointment as a deputy judge in 1970). She was also the first female Attorney General of the Principality of Monaco.
- Monique François: First Monegasque female magistrate appointed as the First President of the Court of Appeal of the Principality of Monaco
- Isabelle Berro-Amadeï: First female in respect of Monaco to serve as a Judge of the European Court of Human Rights (2006)

== Montenegro ==
An unknown woman became the first female judge in Montenegro in 1954. She had served in the Basic Court.

- Julija (Julia) Jovanova Lazović: First female to earn a university (law) degree in Montenegro (1906)
- Zorka Komnenić and Antonija Bulat Stojanović: First female lawyers in Montenegro. Stojanović would become the first female President of the Bar Association of Montenegro.
- Ksenija Raičević: First female appointed as a Judge of the Constitutional Court of Montenegro
- Emilija Durutović: First female to serve as a Justice of the Supreme Court of Montenegro
- Vesna Medenica: First female appointed as a state prosecutor in Montenegro, as well as the first female President of the Supreme Court of Montenegro (c. 2016)
- Ivana Jelić: First female in respect of Montenegro to serve as a Judge (2018) and Vice-President (2024) of the European Court of Human Rights

== Netherlands ==
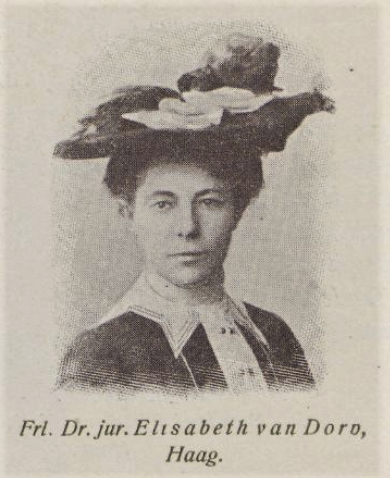
Elisabeth van Dorp: First female to earn a law degree in the Netherlands, but she did not practice as an attorney (1899)

- Elisabeth van Dorp: First female to earn a law degree in the Netherlands in 1899, but she did not practice as an attorney
- Adolphine Kok (law degree 1903): First female lawyer in the Netherlands
- Johanna Clementina Hudig (law degree 1934): First female judge in the Netherlands (1947)
- A.A.L. "Guusje" Minkenhof (law degree c. 1940s): First female advocate general (1966) and first female counselor (1967) at the Supreme Court of the Netherlands
- Dien Korvinus (law degree 1964): First female appointed as the Attorney General of the Netherlands (1970–1999)
- PMA de Groot-van Dijken: First female to serve as the Chairperson of a Bar Association in the Netherlands (upon becoming the Chairperson of the Young Bar Association in Utrecht in 1977)
- Winnie Sorgdrager: First female chief prosecutor of any court in the Netherlands (1994)
- Wilhelmina Thomassen: First female in respect of the Netherlands to serve as a Judge of the European Court of Human Rights (1998)
- Els Unger: First female to serve as the Dean of the Dutch Bar Association [Nederlandse orde van advocaten] (2005)
- Liesbeth Lijnzaad: First Dutch (female) to serve as a Judge of the International Tribunal for the Law of the Sea (2017)
- Dineke de Groot: First female to serve as the President of the Supreme Court of the Netherlands (2020)

== North Macedonia ==
- Gordana Dimitrovska Hristovska Takesz (1983): First female lawyer in North Macedonia [specifically in Bitola, Pelagonia Region, North Macedonia]
- Alma Mustafovska-Salimovska: First Roma female lawyer (now registered with the Bar Association of North Macedonia) in the former country of Yugoslavia
- Branka Ciriviri-Antonovska: First female to serve as a Judge of the Constitutional Court of North Macedonia (1984)
- Margarita Caca Nikolovska: First Macedonian (female) to serve as a Judge at the European Court of Human Rights in Strasbourg (1998)
- Liljana Ingilizova-Ristova: First female to serve as the President of the Constitutional Court of North Macedonia (2003)
- Besa Ademi: First Albanian female appointed as a Judge of the Supreme Court of North Macedonia (2009) and serve as its President (2021)
- Lidija Nedelkova: First female appointed as the President of the Supreme Court of North Macedonia (2012)

== Norway ==
- Maren Cathrine Dahl: First female in Norway to earn a law degree in 1890, but did not practice as an attorney
- Elise Sem (1903): First female lawyer and prosecutor (1904) in Norway. In 1912, she became the first female registered to practice before the Supreme Court of Norway.
- Anne Holmen and Ruth Sörenson Bie: First female judges in Norway (1914)
- Sofie Conradine Schjøtt: First female district court judge in Norway (1926)
- Lilly Bølviken (1942): First female appointed as a Justice of the Supreme Court of Norway (1968)
- Astri Sverdrup Rynning: First female to serve as the Senior Judge President of a Norway Court of Appeal (1980)
- Ellen Holager Andenæs: First female lawyer to become a state prosecutor in Norway (1983)
- Bjørg Ven: First female to serve as the Chairperson of the Norwegian Bar Association (1994)
- Berit Reiss-Andersen: First female permanent defender in the Supreme Court of Norway (1995)
- Hanne Sophie Greve: First female in respect of Norway to serve as a Judge of the European Court of Human Rights (1998)
- Toril Marie Øie (1986): First female justice appointed as the Chief Justice of the Supreme Court of Norway (2016)

=== Svalbard and Jan Mayen ===
- Monica Hansen Nylund: First female judge to serve as the Chief Judge of the Hålogaland Court of Appeal (2017) [jurisdiction includes the island territories Svalbard and Jan Mayen]

== Poland ==
- Janina Podgórska-Jurkiewiczowa: First Polish female admitted as an assistant to a sworn attorney (her admission occurred in the Russian Empire in 1908)
- Blanka Morgenstern, Irena Kaliska, Szaja Frenkel, and Irena Brodzińska: First female law students in Poland (upon their admittance to the University of Warsaw in 1915)
- Helena Kononowicz-Wiewiórska (1925): First female lawyer in Poland
- Wanda Grabińska-Wójtowicz (1925): First female judge in Poland (upon her appointment to the Division XXII for juvenile cases in 1929)
- Izabela Chojecka-Boniecka: First female prosecutor in pre-war Poland (1936)
- Zofia Gawrońska-Wasilkowska: First female to serve as a Judge of the Supreme Court of Poland (1948)
- Maria Szabłowska and Irena Śmietanka-Szwaczkowska: First females to serve as Judges of the Supreme Administrative Court of Poland (1980)
- Maria Teresa Budzanowska: First female to serve as the Vice President of the Polish Bar Council (1979). She was also the first female to serve as the President of its Supreme Bar Council (1983).
- Natalia Gajl: First female elected as a Judge of the Constitutional Tribunal (Poland) (1985)
- Ewa Łętowska: First (female) appointed as the Ombudsman for Citizen Rights in Poland (1988)
- Hanna Suchocka: First female to serve as the Public Prosecutor General of Poland (1997)
- Małgorzata Gersdorf First female to serve as the First President of the Supreme Court of Poland (2014)
- Julia Przyłębska: First female to serve as the President of the Constitutional Tribunal of the Republic of Poland (2016)
- Anna Adamska-Gallant: First female in respect of Poland to serve as a Judge of the European Court of Human Rights (2024)

== Portugal ==
- Regina Quintanilha (1913): First female to earn a law degree and become a lawyer in Portugal
- Cândida Almeida: First female magistrate in Portugal (c. 1971)
- Ruth Garcês (1954): First female judge in Portugal (1977)
- Maria da Assunção Esteves (c. 1989): First female judge to serve on the Portuguese Constitutional Council (1989–1998), as well as become the first female President of the Assembly of the Republic (2011)
- Maria de Jesus Serra Lopes: First female to serve as the President of the Portuguese Bar Association (1990)
- Isabel Jovita Loureiro dos Santos Macedo: First female appointed as a Judge of the Supreme Administrative Court of Portugal (c. 1997)
- Ireneu Cabral Barreto: First female in respect of Portugal to serve as a Judge of the European Court of Human Rights (1998)
- Lin Man (2002): First Sino-Portuguese (female) lawyer in Portugal
- Laura Santana Maia: First female justice to serve in the Supreme Court of Justice of Portugal (2004)
- Isabel Marques da Silva: First female appointed as a President Judge of the Supreme Administrative Court of Portugal (2009)
- Joana Marques Vidal (c. 1978): First female appointed as the Attorney General of Portugal (2012)
- Maria Lúcia Amaral: First female to serve as the Vice-President of the Constitutional Court of Portugal (2012) and Ombudsman for Portugal (2017)
- Maria dos Prazeres Beleza: First female justice to serve as the Vice-President of the Supreme Court of Justice of Portugal (2018)
- Dulce Manuel da Conceição Neto: First female judge to serve as the President of the Supreme Administrative Court of Portugal (2019)

== Romania ==
- Sarmiza Bilcescu (1891): First female to register with the Romanian Bar, but did not practice as an attorney
- Ella Negruzzi (1913): First female lawyer in Romania to actually practice
- Veronica Zosin Gorgos: First female prosecutor (1944) and magistrate in Romania (of Jewish descent)
- Yolanda Eminescu (1943), Sanda Rosetti, and Steliana Popescu: First female judges in Romania (1945)
- Carmen Thea Kahane: First female military prosecutor of Romania
- Aspazia Cojocaru: First female appointed as a Judge of the Constitutional Court of Romania (2004)
- Laura Codruța Kövesi: First female Attorney General of Romania (2006–2012)
- Camelia Toader: First Romanian (female) to serve as a Judge of the European Court of Justice (2007)
- Lidia Bărbulescu: First female judge to serve as the President of the High Court of Cassation and Justice of Romania (2009)
- Simina Avram: First female military magistrate in Romania (2011)
- Iulia Motoc: First female from Romania appointed as a Judge of the European Court of Human Rights (2014) and at the International Criminal Court (2024)
- Renate Weber: First female to serve as the Romanian Ombudsman (2019)

== Russia ==
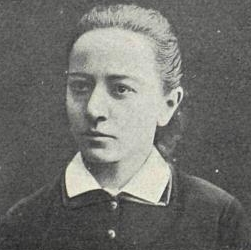
Anna Evreinova: First female to earn a law degree in Russia (1873)

- Anna Mikhailovna Evreinova: First woman in Russia to earn a doctorate in law in 1873 (awarded in Germany by Leipzig University)
- Elizaveta Fedoseevna "E.F." Kozmina: First female to practice law in Russia (c. 1871). Despite passing a required exam by 1875, her legal practice ended when the Minister of Justice forbade women to act as attorneys in 1876.
- Yanina-Anna Podgurskaya, Maria Girshman, and Lidiya Bubnova: First females briefly admitted as assistant attorneys in the Russian Empire (1908)
- Ekaterina Fleischitz and Alexandra Yaroshevskaya (1909): First certified female lawyers respectively in the Russian Empire
- Mukhlisa Bubi: First female judge (Muslim qadi) in the Russian Empire (1917)
- Praskovya Danilova-Plotnikova: First female judge in Soviet Russia (1917)
- Faina Efimovna Nyurina and N. A. Gorsheneva: First females to serve as the Acting Prosecutor General of the RSFSR (1936) and Deputy Prosecutor General of the RSFSR respectively
- Tamara Georgievna Morshchakova: First female to serve as a Judge of the Constitutional Court of the Russian Federation (1991)
- Tatiana Nikolaevna Molchanova: First Russian female to serve as a Judge of the Economic Court of the Commonwealth of Independent States (2003)
- Irina Leonidovna Podnosova: First Russian female to serve as Chief Justice of the Russian Federation (2024)

== San Marino ==
- Rita Palazzetti: First female lawyer who was awarded the notarial seal in San Marino (1974)
- Maria Lea Pedini-Angelini: First female to serve as a Captain Regent of the Republic of San Marino (1980) (Note: The duties of the captains regent include presiding over the Council of XII, which at the time possessed appellate functions, however the captains regent are not usually elected members of the Council, and are not entitled to vote)
- Gloria Giardi, Gianna Burgagni, Antonella Annamaria Bonelli, Daniela Della Balda, Anna Maria Lonfemini and Maria Christina Lonfemini (1995): First females to register as members of the Order of Lawyers and Notaries in San Marino (Ordine degli Avvocati e Notai della Repubblica di San Marino)
- Antonella Mularoni: First female in respect of San Marino to serve as a Judge of the European Court of Human Rights (2001)
- Maria Selva: First female to serve as the President of the Order of Lawyers and Notaries in San Marino (2012). She later became the first female Vice President of the Criminal Chamber of San Marino in 2015 (since the Camera Penale di San Marino's establishment in 2014)
- Gianna Burgagni: First female to serve as the President of the Criminal Chamber of San Marino Association (2016)

== Serbia ==
- Marija Milutinović Punktatorka (1862): First female lawyer in Serbia
- Katarine Lengold Marinković (1933): First female lawyer registered in the Bar Association of Serbia
- Vida Petrović-Škero: First female judge in Serbia (1978)
- Leposava Karamarković: First female to serve as President of the Supreme Court of Cassation of the Republic of Serbia (2001)
- Bosa Nenadić: First female to serve as the President of the Constitutional Court of Serbia (2007)
- Nata Mesarović (1974): First female elected as the President of the Supreme Court of Cassation of the Republic of Serbia (2009)
- Jasmine Milutinović: First female to serve as the President of the Bar Association of Serbia (2021)

== Slovakia ==
- Louise Pappova: First female candidate inscribed into the list of advocates in Slovakia (1925)
- Alžbeta Cziglerová Wildmann (1931): First female lawyer in Slovakia
- Zdeňka Patschová: First female judge in 1934 when the country was a part of Czechoslovakia
- Viera Strážnická: First female in respect of the Slovak Republic to serve as a Judge of the European Court of Human Rights (1998)
- Daniela Švecová: First female to serve as the Vice President (2005) and President of the Supreme Court of the Slovak Republic (2014)
- Ivetta Macejková: First female to serve as the Chief Justice of the Constitutional Court of Slovakia (2007). In 2006, she became the first female appointed as a judge and member of the Criminal Panel of the Supreme Court of the Slovak Republic.

== Slovenia ==
- Zora Tominšek (1929) and Zdenka Brejc-Perne (1937): First female lawyers in Slovenia respectively
- Jolanka Kuhar–Mevželj and Francka Strmole–Hlastec: First females to serve as Judges of the Supreme Court of Slovenia (1974). Strmole–Hlastec later became the first female to serve as the President of the Supreme Court of Slovenia (1991–1993).
- Miroslava Geč-Korošec (1966): First female appointed as a Judge of the Constitutional Court of Slovenia (1998)
- Dragica Wedam Lukić: First female to serve as the President of the Constitutional Court of Slovenia (2001)
- Mirjam Škrk: First female to serve as the Vice President of the Constitutional Court of Slovenia (2004)
- Zdenka Cerar (c. 1966): First female appointed as the Attorney General of Slovenia (2004)
- Verica Trstenjak: First Slovenian (female) to serve as a Judge of the European Union Court of First Instance in Luxembourg (2004). In 2006, she became the First Slovenian (female) to serve as the Advocate General of the European Court of Justice (2006).
- Jana Ahčin: First female to serve as the President of the Court of Audit of Slovenia (2022)
- Beti Hohler: First Slovenian (female) to serve as a Judge of the International Criminal Court (2024)

== Spain ==
- María Ascensión Chirivella Marín (1921): First female registered in a bar association and to actually practice law in Spain
- Asunción Luzón y Luzón: First female to become a civil servant of the Court of Auditors of Spain (1922)
- Victoria Kent: First female lawyer to defend a litigant at a court martial in Spain (1930)
- Maria Luisa Algarra: First female judge in Spain (1936)
- Elvira Fernández Almoguera Casas: First female prosecutor in Spain (1937)
- Julia Álvarez Resano: First female magistrate in Spain (1938)
- María Luisa Suárez Roldán (1941): First female labor lawyer in Spain
- María Jóver Carrión: First female district court judge in Spain (1972)
- Josefina Triguero Agudo: First female appointed as a Judge of First Instance and Instruction after passing the exam (1977)
- Gloria Begué: First female appointed as a magistrate (1980) and the Vice-President of the Constitutional Court of Spain (1986–1989)
- Milagros García Crespo: First female to serve as the President of the Court of Auditors of Spain (1994)
- Milagros Calvo: First female magistrate of the Supreme Court of Spain (Fourth Chamber; 2002)
- María Emilia Casas: First female to serve as the President of the Constitutional Court of Spain (2004)
- María Eugènia Alegret i Burgués: First female to become President of a Superior Court of Justice in Spain (upon becoming the President of the Superior Court of Justice of Catalonia in 2004)
- Ángela Murillo: First female to serve as a magistrate of the Criminal Chamber of the National Court of Spain and its President (2008)
- Consuelo Madrigal (1980): First female appointed as the Attorney General of Spain (2015–2016)
- Clara Martinez de Careaga (1981): First female appointed as a magistrate of the Military Chamber of the Supreme Court of Spain (2009)
- María Elósegui: First female from Spain appointed as a Judge of the European Court of Human Rights (2018)
- Sara Giménez: First Gypsy female lawyer to represent Spain before the ECRI (2018)
- Rosario Silva de Lapuerta: First (Spanish) female to serve as the Vice-President of the European Court of Justice (2018)
- Maria Luisa Segoviano Astaburuaga: First female to become president of a chamber of the High Court (upon becoming the President of the Fourth Chamber of the Supreme Court of Spain in 2020)
- Isabel Perelló: First woman to preside over the General Council of the Judiciary and the Supreme Court of Spain (2024)

== Sweden ==
- Elsa Eschelsson: First female in Sweden to earn a doctorate in law in 1897. She died by suicide when she could not find employment.
- Anna Pettersson: First female (an autodidact) in Sweden to open her own law agency and practice as a legal agent (1904)
- Märta Björnbom: First female associate lawyer in Sweden (1913) (she was not admitted to the Swedish Bar Association until 1925)
- Eva Andén (1918) and Mathilda Staël von Holstein (1921): First two female lawyers respectively in Sweden (upon their admission to the Swedish Bar Association)
- Anna Bugge-Wicksell: First female (a Norwegian-born lawyer) "member of the League of Nations' permanent mandate commission" (1921)
- Birgit Spångberg (1925): First female judge in Sweden (1926)
- Hedvig Anna-Lisa Vinberg (1932): First female to serve as an appellate assessor (1948) and counsel (1953) of a Court of Appeal in Sweden
- Ingrid Gärde Widemar (1948): First female appointed as a Justice of the Supreme Court of Sweden (1968)
- Elizabeth Palm: First female in respect of Sweden to serve as a Judge of the European Court of Human Rights (1988)
- Anne Ramberg (1981): First female lawyer to serve as the Secretary General for the Swedish Bar Association (Sveriges advokatsamfund) (2000)
- Marianne Lundius: First female to serve as the President of the Supreme Court of Sweden (2010)
- Petra Lundh (1987): First female to serve as the Prosecutor-General of Sweden (2018)
- Helena Jäderblom: First female to serve as President of the Supreme Administrative Court of Sweden (2018)

== Switzerland ==
- Emilie Kempin-Spyri: First female to graduate with a law degree in Switzerland in 1887, but denied the ability to practice as an attorney
- Anna Mackenroth (1900): First female lawyer in Switzerland and Zürich
- Dora Labhart-Roeder: First female registered to practice law before the Federal Court of Switzerland (1923)
- Ita Maria Eisenring and Annemarie Geissbühler: First female prosecutors in Switzerland (1959). Eisenright became the first Swiss female cantonal judge in 1979.
- Margrith Bigler-Eggenberger (1961): First female substitute judge (1972) and Judge of the Federal Court of Switzerland (1974)
- Denise Bindschedler-Robert: First female in respect of Switzerland to serve as a Judge of the European Court of Human Rights (1975)
- Anne Colliard: First female appointed as the Attorney General of Switzerland (c. 1990–2010)
- Eva Saluz: First female to serve the President of the Swiss Federation of Lawyers (2003)
- Salome Zimmermann: First female secret service judge in Switzerland (c. 2017)
- Anne Petrig: First female from Switzerland to serve as a Judge Ad Hoc at the International Tribunal for the Law of the Sea (ITLOS) (2019)
- Martha Niquille: First female to serve as the President of the Federal Supreme Court of Switzerland (2021)

== Ukraine ==
- Elena Abramovna Halperin-Ginsburg: One of the first female lawyers in Ukraine. She was denied the right to practice law in 1909 despite passing the bar exam in Kharkiv.
- Olga Elvira Lustig-Hanytska (1938): First Ukrainian female lawyer (she practiced in Galicia, which spanned regions of Poland and Ukraine)
- Tamara Ivanovna Prysiazhniuk: First female to serve as a Justice of the Supreme Court of Ukraine (1988)
- Tatiana Viktorivna Varfolomeeva: First female to serve as the President of the Ukrainian Bar Association (1995)
- Lyudmila Fedorovna Malinnikova and Lyudmila Pantelievna Chubar: First females appointed as Judges of the Constitutional Court of Ukraine (1996)
- Suzanne Romanovna Stanik: First female to serve as a Deputy Chairperson of the Constitutional Court of Ukraine (2006)
- Anna Yudkovskaya: First Ukrainian female to serve as a Judge of the European Court of Human Rights (2010)
- Valentyna Danishevska (1983): First female justice to serve as the Chief Justice of the Supreme Court of Ukraine (2017)
- Natalia Shaptala: First female to serve as the President of the Constitutional Court of Ukraine (2019)
- Iryna Venediktova: First female to serve as the Prosecutor General of Ukraine (2020)

== Vatican City (Holy See) ==
- Silvia Monica Correale: First female lawyer in Vatican City
- Maria Voce: First female lawyer in Holy See
- Catia Summaria: First female Prosecutor at the Vatican Court of Appeals (2021)

== See also ==
- Justice ministry
- List of first women lawyers and judges by nationality
- List of first women lawyers and judges in Africa
- List of first women lawyers and judges in Asia
- List of first women lawyers and judges in North America
- List of first women lawyers and judges in Oceania
- List of first women lawyers and judges in South America
- List of first women lawyers and judges in the United States
- List of the first women holders of political offices in Europe
