= Cazorla =

Cazorla may refer to:

- Cazorla, Andalusia, a town in Spain
- Sierra de Cazorla, a mountain range in Spain
- Cazorla Natural Park, a large protected area in Spain
- Cazorla (surname)
