= Women in 1950s Spain =

Women in 1950s Spain were mainly involved in the domestic sphere.

== Period overview ==
The 1940s and 1950s were a dark period in Spanish history, where the country was still recovering from the effects of the Spanish Civil War. The economy was poor and people suffered a huge number of deprivations as a result of the loss of life and the repressive nature of the regime which sought to vanquish any and all remaining Republican support by going after anyone who had been affiliated with or expressed any sympathies towards the Second Republic.

Internal Spanish female migrants found life in Spain difficult in this period as Francoist policy dictated they remain in the home. Unlike their husbands who could now develop social connections through outside employment, immigrant women were isolated, having left behind their social networks in their home countries.

Until the mid-1950s, Spain was crippled by an economic crisis coupled with a government-imposed repressive society and culture that demanded uniformity and compliance. Starting in the 1950s, Spain started adopting a more consumerist economy. This would continue on into the 1960s and would play a role in introducing Spanish women to the new modern Western woman, eschewing of the concept of Catholic womanhood. The 1950s saw mass migration of people from the countryside to the city. The regime began to adapt their ideology to deal with this new urban reality. Many women made such moves with the hope that they could be more anonymous and avoid accusations of being collaborators with the Republicans.

Starting in the 1950s, foreign films shown in Spain presented women as fully autonomous. This image conflicted with the state-presented image of the ideal Spanish woman, which demanded women surrender agency to their husbands and fathers and become wives and mothers. These films also served to bring Spanish women out of their international isolation. They also helped to feed a Spanish consumerist culture that challenged the regime.

During the 1950s, tourists started to visit Spanish beaches en masse. Their attire of mini skirts and bikinis shifted Spanish cultural perceptions of revealing clothes, and these garments became more socially acceptable.

The 1950s saw a decrease of the importance of the Women's Section of Falange (Sección Femenina) as their role in shoring up the economy and producing propaganda for national unity were less needed. In response, it switched to become more clearly a social welfare arm of the state. The organization lost much of its political influence and position within the Francoist structure. Its survival was largely dependent on their involvement in education and the fact that no other organization offered women of this period the same level of opportunities. Pilar Primo de Rivera was viewed by many inside the regime as a critical player in successfully encouraging Franco to relax restrictions for women during the 1950s and 1960s.

=== Women in opposition to the regime ===
It was only during the 1950s and 1960s that some of the Communist women involved with POUM and Trotskyite purges began to re-evaluate their role in them; their change of hearts only occurred after Stalinist Communism lost its prestige among leftist circles.

The late 1950s and early 1960s saw severe repression of CNT by Franco's government that made activism even more difficult. María Bruguera Pérez participated in clandestine meetings of CNT.

==== Spanish Socialist Workers' Party ====
From the mid-1940s to the mid-1950s, women made up an estimated 10% of the Spanish Socialist Workers' Party membership. Following the end of the Spanish Civil War, SSWP lacked an interior leadership body. Socialist women worked as liaisons or as messengers for clandestine SSWP and UGT activities. Some were sent to prison for many years as a result. Agrupación de Socialistas Asturianos en México member Purificación Tomás would play an important role among socialist women in Mexico in the 1940s and 1950s. She was affiliated with the UGT affiliated exile group Círculo Pablo Iglesias.

Unlike other European countries where parties held control over unions, SSWP had very little leverage over UGT in the 1940s, 1950s and 1960s despite a large overlap in leadership. During the 1950s and 1960s, neither UGT nor SSWP put much consideration into political ideologies and practices related to improving the lives of women. Socialist women played an important role in Asturias by doing clandestine work, such as coordinating between cells, supporting covert strike actions and taking over roles left vacant because male leaders were incarcerated.

During the mid-1940s, 1950s and early 1960s, Barcelona based Movimiento Socialista de Cataluña was highly influenced by the British Labor party, who had developed extensive contacts with the group to give them legitimacy within Catalonia. Female leaders in the group in this period included Serra i Moret. SSWP's relationship with the group in this era was unstable, and Lucila Fernández was the only prominent female figure in SSWP's Catalan organization.

Starting in the 1950s, Josefina Arrillaga Lansorena, a lawyer, began attending clandestine socialist meetings in Madrid. She became involved with Antonio Amat, who wanted to replace the dead Tomás Centeno in order to reconstruct both UGT and SSWP.

==== Women in Unión General de Trabajadores in Francoist Spain ====
Starting in the 1950s, Josefina Arrillaga Lansorena, a lawyer, began attending clandestine socialist meetings in Madrid. She became involved with Antonio Amat, who wanted to replace the dead Tomás Centeno in order to reconstruct both UGT and SSWP.

=== Basque nationalism ===
Basque nationalism was frequently on the wane during the Francoist period. Regime crackdowns on the movement would serve to continually re-activate it. The 1950s were a period which saw support for Basque nationalism split between the PNV and ETA. ETA had a general policy of not targeting women. Women were not actively involved with ETA early in the organization's history. This was because the organization had conservative Roman Catholic roots, which included the idea that women belonged in the home. Wives of Basque nationalists could become socially isolated as a result of their husband's involvement as the organization asked them to avoid socializing with those outside the group. This both protected the organization from discovery and reinforced the movement's ideology by largely only allowing it to dominate in the home as other voices were not heard. This put a huge burden on women.

During the late 1940s and early 1950s, the government's ability to suppress the Basque language began to erode. More works in the Basque language began to appear, including one on the history of the Basque people during the Spanish Civil War. Husbands being involved with political resistance could prove difficult for wives and children as PNV could only pay a small stipend when they were out on assignment. Many of these men also held only working class positions like electricians, furniture makers, and automobile mechanics. This meant their salaries were often low. Women had to work to stretch their money because of the economic status of their jobs and positions within PNV. Despite the security risks, many husbands told their wives about their activities, leaving out critical operational details. This work often required husbands to be away from their lives for long periods of time, leaving their wives to manage everything on the home front. Despite this, few couples separated as a consequence of the man's political activities.

In rural areas of the Basque country, families tended to have patriarchal power structures. Women were often required to look for paid work outside the home as their farms were not self-sustainable given the economic situation in Spain at the time. Middle class Basque nationalist families in the Franco period tended to support the regime's position on families. Wives of Basque nationalists could become socially isolated as a result of their husband's involvement as the organization asked them to avoid socializing with those outside the group. This both protected the organization from discovery and reinforced the movement's ideology by largely only allowing it to dominate in the home as other voices were not heard. This put a huge burden on women.

== Women's rights ==
=== Childcare ===
One of the most important female labor activities in the Francoist period, especially between 1940 and 1970, was childcare. The regime used Sección Femenina and Acción Católica to impose its pro-natalist policies on Spain through the concept of traditional womanhood, that demanded among other things that women tend to the home and be primary caregivers to their children. This was expected of women, even if they were required to take on extra work inside the home or they were able to pay someone to do basic domestic tasks. Men were expected to be in the workforce, providing a steady income that would cover the costs of running the household. There was no differentiation in this period paid and domestic work for women. Both were viewed as two part of the same purpose of women serving Spanish society.

Sección Feminina and Falange provided childcare services during the 1950s and 1960s to women working in the agricultural sector. Official women's participation in this industry were around 5.5%, but informal participation was much higher, resulting in the need for childcare.

=== Contraception ===
For many married Andalusian women in this period, there was a certain fatalism about the fact they would inevitably become mothers. It was difficult for them to try to negotiate family planning with their spouses. Most couples practicing family planning used coitus interruptus during the 1940s and 1950s. The Catholic Church in this period allowed couples to use the rhythm method. As American culture began to influence Spain more during the mid-1950s, Spaniards began to adopt more American birth control methods. Prohibitions against the sale of contraception in Andalusia in this period were largely ineffective as women had various means to try to limit the number of children they had. This was especially true for women engaging in sex outside of marriage at a time when that practice, along with having children when single, were highly condemned by the government. Women were willing to take risks to have sex for pleasure by using some form of birth control.

=== Divorce ===
During the Franco period, there was the concept of "hidden divorce". These were declarations by the Spanish Catholic Church that a marriage was nullified. They were different from ecclesiastical courts dissolution of marriages. These annulments were only allowed because of Pauline privilege, where the church may grant a nullification for a marriage where neither spouse has been baptized. This method of nullification may only be granted when one spouse wishes to convert to Catholicism and the other does not. This allows the converted Catholic spouse to be able to remarry a practicing Catholic.

Another way a marriage could end under Catholic law was known as Petrine privilege. A divorce could be granted if the married coupled included a Catholic and non-Catholic spouse, where the Catholic spouse wanted the separation so they could remarry to a Catholic.

=== Guardianship ===
Up until the mid-1960s, Franco's legal system gave husbands near total control over their wives. This would not change until women started playing a more central role in the Spanish economy.

== By year ==
=== 1950 ===
Miren Gezala was raised in a PNV militant family during her formative years during the Dictatorship of Primo de Rivera and the Second Spanish Republic. She was a member of Emakume Abertzale Batzaren. During and after the war, Gezala followed her family in exile to Salamanca, France, Madrid, and Barcelona. She was banned by the Franco government from returning to Gipuzkoa for 15 years. She returned to Basque country around 1950, where she started working as a teacher in Idiazabal. Later, she took up a teaching position in Pasai Donibane, where she remained her retirement.

=== 1952 ===
Carmen García Bloise joined Juventudes Socialistas in 1952.

==== Women and Basque nationalism in 1952 ====
Julene Azpeitia was a teacher involved with PNV before the Civil War. She fled Spain following the war, but returned by 1947 where she took a teaching job at a Provincial Council school of Bilbao. The regime punished her with jail time in 1949, and was let out in 1952.

Azpeitia returned to teaching in 1952, this time in Burgos before retiring in 1958. She returned to writing Basque and Spanish language children books, publishing a number of stories in the next sixteen years.

ETA was founded in 1952 at the University of Duesto in Bilbao. The organizations founders were unhappy with what they saw as the failure of the Basque Nationalist Party to unify the Basque people in hatred against the Spanish state following a failed strike effort in 1952 in Bilbao. The seven founders believed PNV was ineffective because they were not engaging in active, violent opposition to the regime.

=== 1953 ===
In 1953, a pact was signed by the United States and Spain which saw American troops stationed in Spain. These troops brought with them a consumerist attitude and American dollars to assist in the Spanish economy. Their arrival marked a transition point in the Franco regime from an autarky economy to a consumerist economy.

The Spanish Association of University Women was created in 1953 in Oviedo, and then later that same year in Madrid. Delegations were then created in Barcelona in 1970, and Granada, Valencia, Santander, A Coruña and Valladolid in 1974 and 1975.

Errose Busting was a writer and Emakume Abertzale Batza member. Before the Civil War, she worked as a reporter for Euzkadi where her work was nominated for an award. During the war, she was a journalist for Eguna, before leaving for exile in Basile. At the end of the war, she returned to live in Mañaria with her sister. Busting died on 20 August 1953 of leukemia.

ETA grew in the summer of 1953 when they recruited two smaller organizations into their own. In this period, the organization was known as Ekin and was dominated by students and young people. They began to get more members and adherents, and soon caught the attention of the Basque Nationalist Party.

Following the death of SSWP leader Tomás Centeno in 1953, in prison, the SSWP Executive Committee and broader leadership were largely destroyed.

=== 1954 ===
PNV invited ETA to merge with them, and negotiations for this took place between 1954 and 1957, with the original group finally agreeing to dissolve and become a youth branch called Euzko Gaztedi.

=== 1955 ===
Sección Femenina played a critical role in advancing changes to the 1955 Ley de Regimen Local about the role of married women in 1968. Consequently, married women were allowed to vote and run in local elections.

The regime's relation to the Basque language and Basque nationalism has three periods. The second phase from 1955 to 1975. In this period, the government accepted they could not fully suppress the usage of Basque, and consequently became more tolerant of it.

Starting around 1955, the government created a childcare policy for children aged three to five, with the goal of developing skills and abilities that would enable them to do better in schools. These programs were not identified as childcare in that they were not primarily about relieving mothers of childcare responsibilities so they could participate in the workforce. There were a number of reasons that childcare in the Francoist period was not centered around the needs of working mothers. These included low levels of female participation in the workforce, societal and cultural views that children under the age of three are best taken care of by their mothers, and the dictatorship imposing its concepts of womanhood on the broader population.

=== 1956 ===
Television Española (TVE) began in 1956 with an hour of daily programs. One year later, in 1957, TVE had five hours of daily programming. In this early period, it was primarily funded by the state. By 1963, this had changed with 92% of its funding coming from commercial activities while producing 66 hours of programming a week.

The 26 October 1956 Decree of the Modification of the Regulation of the Civil Registry of 1870 was a result of the Spanish and Vatican 27 August 1953 Concordat. It resulted in the full recognition of civil marriage within Canonical Law; it harmonized civil marriages with Catholic marriages. It also meant all separation procedures would be handled through ecclesiastical courts.

=== 1957 ===
Franco appointed economic advisers in 1957 to implement a liberalization of the Spanish economy.

Starting in 1957, Falange essentially became a semi-official internal opposition party in Spain as a result of the regime's new policy that saw it abandon economic isolationism.

Law of 8 June 1957 of the Civil Registry saw further attempts to harmonize Canonical Law with Spain's civil code as it related to the requirements of civil marriage. The 1958 Article 42 of the Civil Code – EDL 1889/1 reforms continued this process.

From 1957 to 1962, the Franco regime faced labor strikes in Asturias, with the biggest in Pozo María Luisa. Sindicato de los Obreros Mineros de Asturias (SOMA) had its greatest strength in this region, with socialist and communist women leading the organization of strikes on 23 March 1957. They organized in two locations, including the esplanade of Pozo María Luisa and at the highway connecting Oviedo with Campo de Caso. Their actions would serve as a blueprint for future strikes at the Nalón and Caudal mining basins.

=== 1958 ===
In 1958, Josefina Arrillaga and José Federico de Carvajal created a Spain based a UGT Lawyers' Office, which allowed the organization to provide legal services to many people including Antonio Alonso Baño, Luis Castillo Almena, Carlos Zayas and María Luisa Suárez Roldán.

SSWP and UGT were almost decapitated in 1958 following a police arrest of many of the leading figures of the movement from Asturias, Basque Country and Madrid. Antonio Amat was among those arrested. He was represented by Josefina Arrillaga Lansorena. While Amat was in prison, Josefina Arrillaga Lansorena took control of the SSWP party apparatus. Among the things she accomplished was creating a priority list agreed upon by other Madrid SSWP members. This included maintaining a relationship with SSWP leadership in Toulouse, showing solidarity and support for SSWP prisoners, issuing regular newsletters and reports, and integrating the organization both internally and externally. One of the most important things Arrillaga Lansorena did was establish a relationship with the socialist backed Asturian miners. Another important thing she did was make contact with foreign newspapers including Britain's The Times, the American Associated Press, and the French Agence France-Presse where she provided a different perspective on the realities of Francoist Spain.

In November 1958, there were a large number of raids conducted by the Spanish state that saw many people arrested and sent to prison around the whole of Spain. Those who were arrested would include many women involved with the miners strike in Asturias earlier in the year. Many of the women imprisoned as a result of the raid would go on to play leading roles in the Spanish socialist community of the 1960s. Among those arrested was Josefina Arrillaga Lansorena. In 1958, Josefina Arrillaga and José Federico de Carvajal created a Spain based a UGT Lawyers' Office, which allowed the organization to provide legal services to many people including Antonio Alonso Baño, Luis Castillo Almena, Carlos Zayas and María Luisa Suárez Roldán.

=== 1959 ===
Starting in 1957 in Basque nationalist circles, the next two years would be filled with tension as PNV leadership and Ekin battled it out over ideological differences in their approach to nationalist goals. This would come to a head with ETA being formed in 1959 by Euzko Gaztedi members, who announced the split by spray painting "ETA" on walls in Basque cities. The group then set an original founding day on 31 July because of its significance as the feast day of the patron saint of Guipúzcoa and Vizcaya provinces, Saint Ignacio de Loyola.

1. While Pilar Primo de Rivera was loyal to the regime, there were some instances where as leader of Sección Femenina she opposed Franco's moves. She opposed the 1959 move of her brother's tomb from the Palace of El Escorial to the Valley of the Fallen.

The 1959 Stabilization Plan to address the needs of the Spanish economy marked the official switch to a modern Spanish economy, with a formal end to the autarky policies of the past.

United Nations General Assembly created the Rights of Children document in 1959. This was part of an effort to criminalize neglect of children and people intentionally endangering children.<ref">Herrera López, Sergio; López Fraile, Pilar (March 2013). "Infancia y salud mental pública en España: siglo XX y actualidad". Revista de la Asociación Española de Neuropsiquiatría. 33 (117): 95–111. doi:10.4321/S0211-57352013000100007 (inactive 12 July 2025). ISSN 0211-5735.</ref>

By 1959, divisions had emerged between socialist elements in the Spanish interior and those in leadership in Toulouse in the exterior. Josefina Arrillaga was at the center of this battle for the heart of SSWP and UGT.

The 1959 Law of Public Order was created to prevent people from protesting by punishing organizers financially. Fines could be given up to 500,000 pesetas for holding unauthorized protests. The law had a chilling effect on those seeking to express opposition to the regime. As a result of this law, the Court of Public Order (TOP) would be created in December 1963 with the intention of punishing any person or association that disturbed public order. This included work stoppages and strikes, and any attempts to block public roads, or anyone disobeying public officials telling crowds to disperse. Sanctions could be levied by mayors, civil governors, the Minister of the Interior and the Council of Ministers. Fines could be increased by 50% if alleged participants had a police or criminal record.
