= Cazorla (surname) =

Cazorla is a Spanish surname that may refer to the following notable people:

- Carlos Cazorla (born 1977), Spanish basketball player
- José Cazorla Maure (1903–1940), Spanish communist leader
- José Cazorla (sport shooter) (born 1914), Venezuelan sports shooter
- Maite Cazorla (born 1997), Spanish basketball player, sister of Carlos
- Márcio Cazorla (born 1971), Brazilian football player
- Santi Cazorla (born 1984), Spanish football player
- Sergio Arias Cazorla (born 1933), Venezuelan human geneticist
- Soledad Cazorla (1955–2015), Spanish jurist
