= Ollerup =

- Town
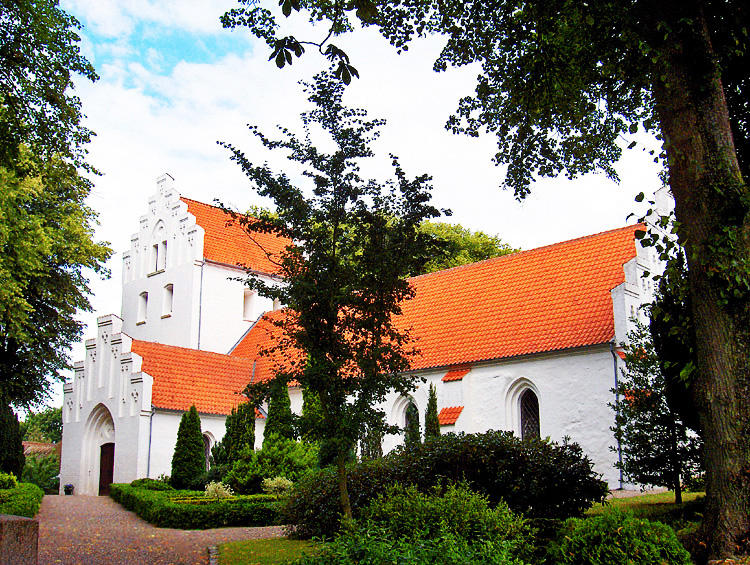
- Ollerup Church

- Location in the Region of Southern Denmark
- Coordinates: 55°4′17″N 10°29′45″E
- Country: Denmark
- Region: Southern Denmark
- Municipality: Svendborg

Area
  - Urban: 1.1 km^{2} (0.42 sq mi)

Population (2026)
  - Urban: 1,582
  - Urban density: 1,400/km^{2} (3,700/sq mi)
- Time zone: UTC+1 (CET)
  - Summer (DST): UTC+2 (CEST)

Ollerup is a town located on the island of Funen in south-central Denmark, in Svendborg Municipality.

== Notable people ==
- Nanna Kristensen-Randers (1864–1908) a Danish lawyer and folk high school administrator; from 1894 she assisted in running Ollerup Højskole
- Niels Bukh (1880–1950) a Danish gymnast and educator who founded the first athletic folk high school in Ollerup
- Ejnar Mindedal Rasmussen (1892 in Ollerup – 1975 in Ollerup) a Danish Neoclassical architect
- Count Eigil Knuth (1903–1996) a Danish explorer, archaeologist, sculptor and writer; in 1932, he graduated as a gymnastics teacher from Ollerup Physical Training College
- Mogens Møller (1934–2021) a Danish minimalist painter and sculptor, from 2004 to 2007, he helped carry out comprehensive decoration work at the Ollerup School of Gymnastics
