= Birgit Spångberg =

Swedish lawyer

Birgit Spångberg (1900-1937) was a Swedish lawyer. She was the first female judge in Sweden (1926).
