= Ejnar Mindedal Rasmussen =

Danish architect

Olympic medal record

Art competitions
Silver medal – second place	1928 Amsterdam	Architectural design

Ejnar Mindedal, born Mindedal Rasmussen (19 June 1892 – 23 December 1975) was a Danish Neoclassical architect. He was a traditionalist who adhered to the Danish Bedre Byggeskik movement which emphasized traditional Danish construction practices. However he did not shy from using modern materials like concrete in, for example, his breakthrough work 'Swimming Pool in Ollerup, for which he won a Silver Medal in the Architectural Design discipline at the 1928 Summer Olympics in Amsterdam.

== Education ==
Ejnar Mindedal was born in Ollerup, Funen, Denmark. He was the son of the Daniel Rasmussen (1865-1955) and his wife Thyra F. Sørensen (1862-1949). His father was an architect and the principal of Ollerup Handicraft School (Ollerup Folkehøjskole).

He was a joiner apprentice from May 1907 to August 1908 and attended Vallekilde High School. He attended Ollerup Handicraft School and studied under Ivar Bentsen. He was a student of the sculptor R. Mogensen in Svendborg. In September 1918 he passed the entrance exam for The Royal Danish Academy of Fine Arts, School of Architecture, from where he graduated in January 1923.

== Career ==
Ejnar Mindedal started his own practice in Ollerup in 1923. In his career he worked as, among other positions;

- Architect for da:Statens Jordlovsudvalg
- Expert advisor for da:Landbrugsministeriet, now The Danish Ministry of Food, Agriculture and Fisheries and da:Indenrigsministeriet (Ministry for Interior Affairs) from 1923-1932
- Head of Ollerups Craftsman School from 1932
- Building consultant for clergy houses in Svendborg County from 1943
- Architect for Vallø Diocese from 1945
- Member of da:Grænseforeningens building committee

In addition to his Silver Medal at the 1928 Olympics, he received Queen Alexandra's Grant in 1931, participated in the Charlottenborg Spring Exhibition in 1921 and 1929 and the Charlottenborg Fall Exhibition in 1922.

== Personal life ==
He married Margrethe Hansen (December 1, 1898 - July 8, 1978) on October 1, 1922 in Bandholm. He died in Ollerup during 1975 and was buried in Ollerup Cemetery.

== Selected works ==
- Gymnastikhøjskolen (Gymnastics High School) in Ollerup, Svendborgvej 3, Ollerup (1920)
- Villa, Øster Skerningevej 6 in Vester Skerninge (1923)
- Gjellerup Church, Hammerum (1924 - with Daniel Rasmussen)
- Swimming Pool, Ollerup Gymnastikhøjskole (1925 - Silver Medal at 1928 Olympics)
- Villa, Øster Skerningevej 8 in Vester Skerninge (1925)
- Hammerum Havebrugs School (1926 - with Daniel Rasmussen)
- Villa, Assensvej 119 in Stenstrup (1926)
- Municipal School in Hågerup (1926)
- Municipal School in Kullerup (1928)
- Villa, Klostergade 32 in Faaborg (1929)
- Lem Sydsogns Church near Ringkøbing (1929-31 - with Daniel Rasmussen)
- Stables for Dalum Agriculture School in Hjallese (1929 - with Daniel Rasmussen)
- Villa, Øster Skerningevej 4 in Vester Skerninge (1931)
- Ollerup Craftsman School (1932)
- Clergy House in Ollerup (1935)
- Clergy House in Brenderup (1937)
- Clergy House in Søndersø (1939)
- Clergy House in Pårup (1940)
- Clergy House on the island of Drejø (1942)
