= Milagros Calvo =

María Milagros Calvo Ibarlucea (Valladolid, 15 August 1947) is a Spanish jurist expert on Employment and Labour Law. In 2002 she became the first female judge of the Supreme Court of Spain.

== Biography ==
She started to study Law in 1965. At that time, women were not allowed to become judges or public attorneys. She worked as court clerk in the provincial courts of Villena y Yecla, in Murcia (Spain). In 1977 she prepared the exam of judges and public attorneys. In January 1978 she moved to Toledo, one month before she passed the exam. She started as a public attorney in the Biscay Audience in 1979, with Josefina Triguero Agudo, first woman that became a judge in Spain in 1978, and in 1980 she became judge of the employment area. Four years later she was appointed Magistrada de Trabajo, employment judge number 1 in Madrid and in 1988 she was appointed to the Employment section of the High Court of Madrid.

Between 1994 and 1999, she was elected, as part of the professional association Asociación Profesional de la Magistratura (APM), to be part of the governing body of the tribunal. She was also chair of the Madrid section of the APM.

She also taught employment law at the Universidad Complutense de Madrid.

=== Justice of the Supreme Court ===
She applied several times to the Supreme Court and was finally appointed so by the General Council of the Judiciary in February 2002 upon proposal from the conservative sector, becoming at her 54 years the first woman to be a Justice of the Supreme Court after 190 years of existence.

Around a hundred employment lawyers signed a petition against it, referring to her lack of experience, notwithstanding the support of the APM. Other candidates for the four vacancies of the Supreme Court were Margarita Robles, Soledad Cazorla, Alicia Camacho and the law professor María Teresa Freixes.

Calvo retired in August 2019, when the Supreme Court had only 14 women out of 100 Justices, and with only one female Justice in the Civil and Military sections.

In January 2020 she was honoured by Spanish women of the legal sector.
