= Lorraine Schembri Orland =

Maltese judge (born 1959)

Judge of the European Court of Human Rights in respect of Malta
- Incumbent
- Assumed office September 2019
- Preceded by: Vincent A. De Gaetano

Personal details
- Born: 21 June 1959 (age 67) Pietà, Malta
- Education: University of Malta

Lorraine Schembri Orland (born 21 June 1959) in Malta is a Maltese judge at the European Court of Human Rights.

== Biography ==
Schembri Orland obtained a doctorate of laws in 1981, and a magister juris in European Law in 1996, both from the University of Malta.

From 1988 to 1990, she served as elected member to the Executive Board of the International Council of Women (ICW). She took part from 1991 to 1993 in drafting legislative and constitutional reforms to eliminate gender-based discrimination from the laws of Malta in view of the country's accession to the CEDAW convention. She also held positions with the European Council of Women, Malta's National Consultative Committee on Bioethics, as well as the San Blas Drug Rehabilitation Centre set up by Caritas Malta.

Appointed Judge in 2012 by Malta's prime minister Lawrence Gonzi, she presided over the Civil Court in regards of matter of fundamental human rights as well as of probate, minority, interdiction and incapacitation, guardianships, trusts, foundations and cross border successions.

Justice Schembri Orland was the presiding judge in a number of Maltese landmark cases, such as in X vs Attorney General and Commissioner of Police in which she ruled that Malta breached the positive obligations under Art. 3 ECHR & Art. 36 of the Constitution (inhuman or degrading treatment) and Art. 8 ECHR (right to family and private life) due to the systematic failures in the procedures adopted by the police investigating and prosecuting incidences of domestic violence. In Marie Therese Cuschieri vs Attorney General, Malta's Constitutional Court, also presided by Schembri Orland, ruled that legal requirement dictating that women need to give details on their marital status in deeds of property sales was deemed to be discriminatory and unconstitutional.

In July 2019, Schembri Orland ruled that the right to freedom of expression of the Caruana Galizia family were being breached by the governmental removal of banners in private spaces.

In September 2019, she was sworn in as Malta's judge at the European Court of Human Rights in Strasbourg, the first woman to hold such position. Schembri Orland was preferred by the Parliamentary Assembly of the Council of Europe over the other two candidates from Malta, Victoria Buttigieg and Abigail Lofaro.

She is married since 1983 to George Schembri Orland; they have a son.
