= Victoria Buttigieg =

Attorney-General of Malta
- Incumbent
- Assumed office September 2020

Personal details
- Born: 28 November 1976 (age 49) Pietà, Malta
- Education: University of Malta
- Website: https://attorneygeneral.mt/the-attorney-general/

Victoria Buttigieg (born 28 November 1976) is a Maltese lawyer. She has served as Attorney General of Malta since 2020.

== Biography ==
Buttigieg studied Law at the University of Malta, where she earned her bachelor's degree in 1998 and her Doctor of Laws (Dr. iur.) in 2001. In 2002, she was admitted to the bar in Malta. That same year, she joined the Maltese Ministry of Infrastructure. In 2007, she became a lawyer at the Maltese Attorney General's office, and in 2010, she was promoted to senior lawyer. In 2012, Buttigieg became Deputy Attorney General, heading the departments of Civil Law, Administrative Law, and Constitutional Law.

In 2019, she was one of the Maltese candidates in the election to succeed Vincent De Gaetano, a judge retiring at the European Court of Human Rights, but lost the election to Lorraine Schembri Orland.

In 2019, Buttigieg was appointed Malta's first State Attorney. In this role, she advised and represented the government on civil, administrative, and constitutional matters, a function previously performed by the department she headed at the attorney general's office.

=== Attorney General ===
On 9 September 2020, Buttigieg was appointed attorney general, the first woman to serve in the role.

Buttigieg's critics accused her of being too lenient in her rulings, though she retained the confidence of Justice Minister Jonathan Attard.

== Links ==
- Victoria Buttigieg, Attorney General of Malta
