= Anne-Marie Gentily =

First woman to act as judge in French Children's Court

Anne-Marie Gentily (June 12, 1882 - May 24, 1972) was the first French female assessor of a judge and judge at the Children's Court, she was one of the leading figures in Female Masonry postwar years. Anne-Marie Gentily was one of the first nine members of the Supreme Women's Council of France.

== Biography ==
Before the Second World War II, Anne-Marie Pedeneau-Gentily was litigation secretary at the Paris Juvenile court, before becoming the first female judge's assessor.

An emblematic figure and pioneer Freemasonry and women, she was initiated in 1925 into the adopted lodge “La Nouvelle Jerusalem” belonging to the Grande Loge de France, and was raised to Master in 1927. She was one of the founders of the “Minerve” adoption lodge, of which she was first Worshipful Mistress from 1931 to 1937, then Worshipful Mistress of Honor. This was the lodge where she met Maxime Gentily, who became her husband.

In 1935, the convent of the Grande Loge de France, without consulting the sisters of its adopted lodges, proposed, at the request of Grand Master Louis Doignon, to grant full autonomy to the adopted lodges and “fraternally invited” them to create their own exclusively feminine obedience. The sisters, not yet ready for such a creation, obtained the status quo. They set up a study commission to prepare for independence. The Annual Congress of Adoptive Lodges, created in 1926 and operating unofficially, was formalized in 1936 under the joint presidency of Louis Doignon and Éliane Brault. A large congress secretariat was created, and Anne-Marie Gentily was elected first president. In 1937, the 1st official congress, which she also chaired, was similar to a first convent, with eight lodges present.

The Second World War II put an end to all Masonic activities, and in 1940, as a Jew, she and her husband joined the Zone libre. During this period, she took part in the French Resistance with the Libérer et Fédérer movement in Lamagistère, Tarn-et-Garonne.

== See also ==
- First women lawyers around the world
