= Wanda Grabińska =

Polish lawyer and judge

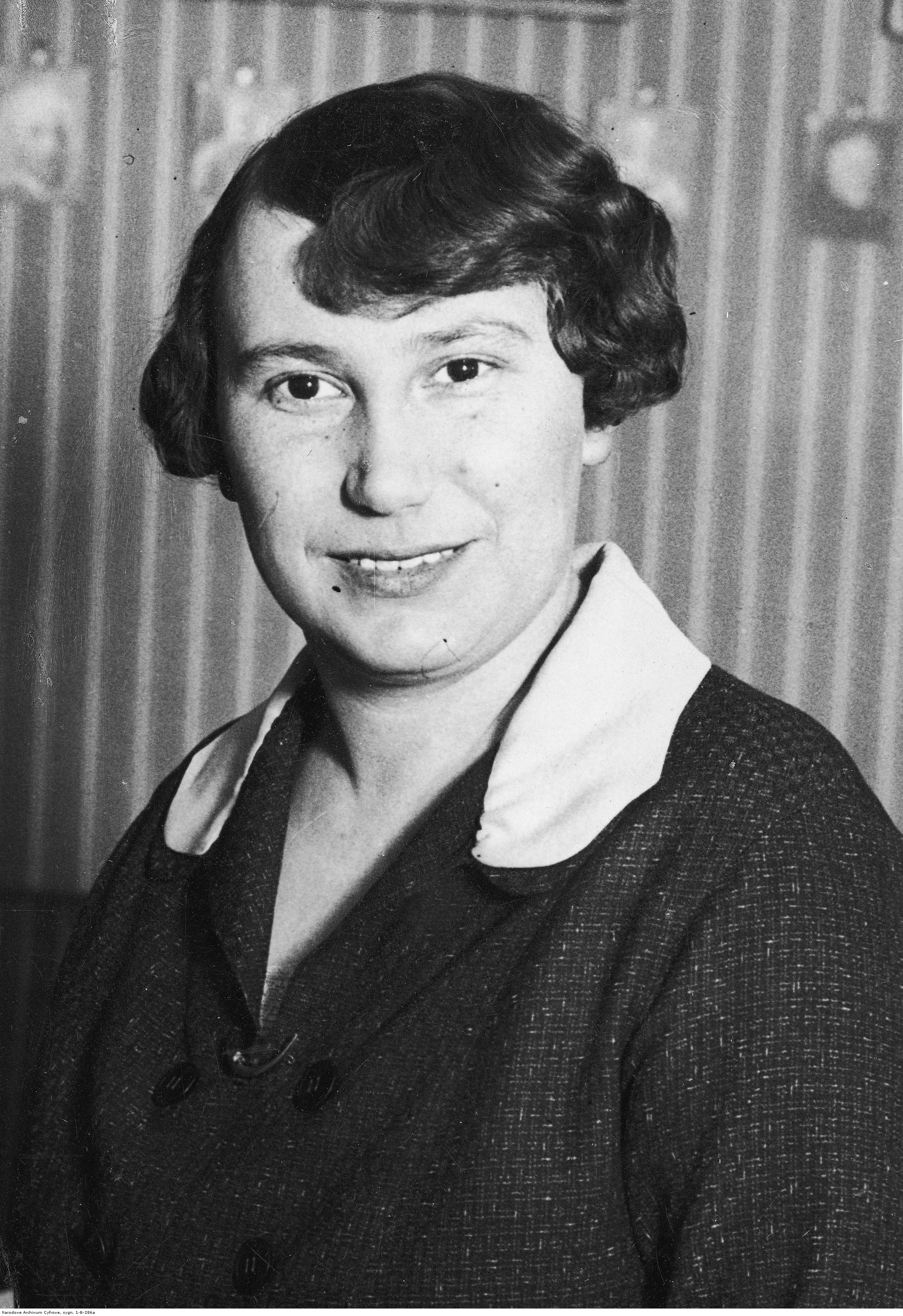
Wanda Grabińska

Wanda Grabińska (1902-1980), was a Polish lawyer and judge. She was the first female judge in Poland.

She graduated in law in 1924. In 1927, she applied for the position of judge on the basis that the Polish constitution recognized equal rights for the sexes to all public positions. Her application was approved and she was named judge 6 March 1929. She thereby became the first woman in that position in Poland. In 1929, she was one of the founders of the Lawyer's association. She was later engaged at the social insurance bureau.
