= Nanna Kristensen-Randers =

Danish lawyer and folk high school proponent

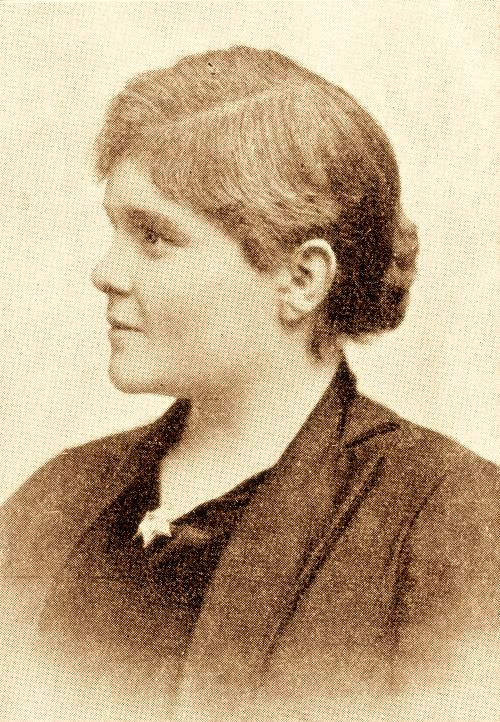
- Born: Nanna Berg; 3 November 1864; Bogø, Denmark
- Died: 15 April 1908 (aged 43); Ollerup, Denmark
- Resting place: Ollerup Cemetery
- Education: N. Zahle's School; University of Copenhagen
- Father: Chresten Poulsen Berg

Nanna Kristensen-Randers née Berg (1864–1908) was a Danish lawyer and folk high school administrator. In 1887, she became the first Danish woman to receive a law diploma. From 1894, she assisted her husband, J.P. Kristensen-Randers, in running Ollerup Højskole on the island of Funen.

== Early life and education ==
Born on 3 November 1864 on the island of Bogø, Nanna Berg was the daughter of the politician Chresten Poulsen Berg (1829–91) and the publisher Maren Bertelsen (1836–1906). She was brought up in a Grundtvegian milieu, her father being the founder of Bogø's Navigation School. In 1876, she moved with her family to Hillerød where her mother looked after her while her father became involved in publishing and politics. When the family settled in Copenhagen in 1884, she attended N. Zahle's School where she was said to have been extraordinarily hard-working and gifted.

== Career ==
Berg was the first woman in Denmark to receive a legal qualification from the University of Copenhagen. In 1887, she successfully completed the course introduced under the political reforms to solve the problem of inadequate manning of the lower courts of law. She worked for the established lawyer Svend Høgsbro (1855–1910) who allowed her to represent him in court. Despite his efforts, as a woman she was however not permitted to work in high courts such as Østre Landsret and Højesteret. This state of affairs continued until 1909 when Henny Magnussen was permitted to follow the full university law course leading to the degree cand.jur.

Following in her father's footsteps, Nanna Berg worked for a time as his secretary. She became an active member of the Danish Women's Society, lecturing at various folk high schools and colleges, including the one at Ollerup. There she met J.P. Kristensen-Randers whom she married in 1890. The couple acquired the school in 1894 and expanded it. Kristensen-Randers became the matron for some 150 borders and handled the school accounts. The school became one of the most popular colleges in Denmark.

In the mid-1890s, she began to suffer from asthma. Nanna Kristensen-Randers died in Ollerup on 15 April 1908. She is buried in Ollerup Cemetery.
