= Marie-Victoire de Lambilly =

French lawyer (1767–1813)

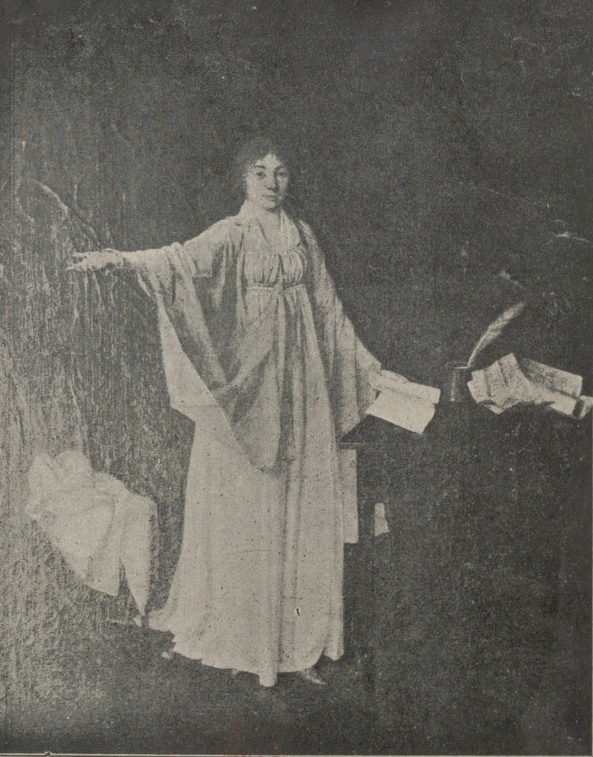
- Born: 27 April 1767; Rennes, France
- Died: 12 July 1813 (aged 46); Lamballe, France
- Family: Lambilly family

Marie-Victoire de Lambilly (1767–1813) was a French lawyer. de Lambilly was the first woman to appear before the Military Commission of Paris.

== Biography ==
Lambilly was the daughter of Pierre de Lambilly. She married Jean Baptiste Mouësan de La Villirouët on 12 June 1787 in Rennes.

During the French Revolution, her husband was imprisoned in Lamballe between 1793 and 1795, then again arrested by the revolutionary police and tried in Paris before the Military Commission of Paris in 1799 for "desertion", following his emigration during the Revolution. After he returned from England, he faced execution.

During her trial, Victoire de Lambilly obtained permission to defend her husband herself, pleading alone before the commission, and succeeded in obtaining his unanimous acquittal.

She is considered the first female lawyer in Brittany and France.
