= Martha Niquille =

President of the Federal Supreme Court of Switzerland

Martha Niquille - Eberle

Judge of the Federal Supreme Court of Switzerland
- Incumbent
- Assumed office 2008

President of the Federal Supreme Court of Switzerland
- Incumbent
- Assumed office 2021
- Preceded by: Ulrich Meyer

Personal details
- Born: Martha Niquille; 27 August 1954 (age 71)
- Spouse: Christoph Niquille
- Education: Law
- Alma mater: University of St. Gallen
- Profession: Lawyer, Judge

Martha Niquille-Eberle (born 27 August 1954) is a Swiss jurist and judge at the Federal Supreme Court of Switzerland in Lausanne. In 2021, and after ninety seven male presidents, she assumed she as its president as the first woman. She is a member of the political party The Centre.

== Early life and education ==
She was born on the 27 August 1954 and grew up in Muolen. She attended law school at the University of St.Gallen where she obtained her doctorate in 1982 and the lawyers exam in 1984. Between 1979 and 1981 she was an assistant for constitutional and administrative law at the University of St. Gallen. She practiced as a lawyer in St.Gallen between 1984 and 1988.

== Professional career ==
From 1987 to 1993 she was a lecturer at the University of St. Gallen for law on obligations and also a part-time judge at the Cantonal Court of St. Gallen. From 1993 to 2008 she was a regular judge at the Cantonal Court of St. Gallen, and assumed as its president between 2005 and 2007. For the time her children attended primary school she was granted an exceptional 80% tenure as at the time judges were obliged to a work a 100%.

=== Federal Supreme Court of Switzerland ===
Since 2008 she is a judge at the Federal Supreme Court of Switzerland, for which she was elected and acting as a vice-president since 2017. On the 12 December 2020, she was elected with 173 votes of 174 of the Swiss Parliament but without the votes of the Swiss People's Party (SVP) who turned in blank votes.

== Personal life ==
She is the first female president of the Federal Supreme Court of Switzerland after ninety seven male presidents had preceded her. She is a member of the political party The Centre, on whose support she could count during the election process. In 2007 she campaigned for the executive council of St.Gallen, but was not seen as a viable candidate by her party The Centre. She lives in St.Gallen and is married to Christoph Niquille, a former executive at the Helvetia insurance and has two children. Her places of origin are Wittenbach, Hägenschwil and Charmey.
