= Margarete Haimberger-Tanzer =

Austrian lawyer, prosecutor and judge (1916-1987)

Margarete Charlotte Haimberger-Tanzer (25 May 1916, Vienna - 1987) was an Austrian lawyer, prosecutor and judge. Haimberger-Tanzer was the first woman to serve as a criminal judge at a court in the Republic of Austria and one of the first female judges in Austrian legal history. In 1950, Margarete Haimberger was appointed as the first woman criminal judge and thereby initially transferred to the district court Bad Ischl. A year later, she returned to the Vienna Regional Court for Criminal Matters, where she was the first examining magistrate and in 1956 was the first woman chairing a Schöffenverhandlung.
