= Dorothea Heron =

First woman solicitor to practice in Ireland

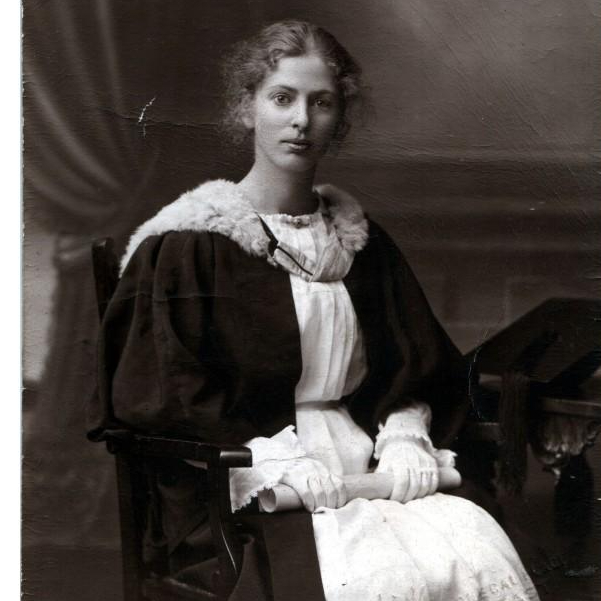
- Born: Mary Dorothea Heron; 19 August 1896; Dublin, Ireland
- Died: 9 October 1960 (aged 64); County Londonderry, Northern Ireland
- Occupation: solicitor
- Known for: first woman to be admitted to the Roll of Solicitors in Ireland

(Mary) Dorothea Heron (19 August 1896 – 9 October 1960), was the first woman to be admitted to the Roll of Solicitors in Ireland.

== Biography ==
Mary Dorothea Heron was born in County Dublin on 19 August 1896. Her father, James Heron, was the county surveyor and her mother was a university graduate. Heron attended Victoria College and graduated from Queen's University Belfast with a bachelor of Arts in classics followed by law (B.A., LLB). She became indentured to her uncle Thomas Heron of Belfast, on 7 February 1920. Because of the partition of Ireland which took place on 1 October 1921 Heron practiced in the North although she was one of the last to qualify to practice on both sides of the Irish border. In January 1923 Heron came second in her Final Examination and joined the roll of solicitors on the 17 April 1923. Though she worked in her uncle's office until 1946, Heron never took out a practicing certificate, which is why Helena Early is counted as the first woman to practice as a solicitor. It was common for non court attending solicitors not to have the certificate. Heron died on 9 October 1960.
