= Vincent A. De Gaetano =

Maltese judge

Judge of the European Court of Human Rights in respect of Malta
- In office 20 September 2010 – September 2019
- Preceded by: Giovanni Bonello
- Succeeded by: Lorraine Schembri Orland

Chief Justice of Malta
- In office 26 August 2002 – 9 September 2010
- Prime Minister: Eddie Fenech Adami, Lawrence Gonzi
- Preceded by: Noel Arrigo
- Succeeded by: Silvio Camilleri

Personal details
- Born: 17 August 1952 (age 74) Sliema, Malta
- Education: University of Malta

Vincent A. De Gaetano (born 17 August 1952) is a Maltese judge, serving since 2010 as judge of the European Court of Human Rights in respect of Malta. He retired in September 2019 as Section President.

De Gaetano succeeded Giovanni Bonello, who, together with two other candidates, had been proposed in 1998 by then Prime Minister Alfred Sant. The election of a Maltese judge for the ECHR had been protracting since 2004, with the Parliamentary Assembly of the Council of Europe twice rejecting the Maltese Government's all-male lists.

De Gaetano had served from 2002 till 2010 as Chief Justice of Malta.

He was Vice President of Section IV till September 2018, and President till September 2019, when he retired and was succeeded as ECHR judge for Malta by Lorraine Schembri Orland.

He is currently serving as Commissioner for Education within the office of the Ombudsman.
