= Katherine Delahunt-O'Byrnes =

First woman solicitor to become Circuit Court judge in Ireland

- Born: Katherine Mary Delahunt; 28 April 1956; Wicklow, Ireland
- Died: 1 April 2015 (aged 58)
- Education: University College Cork
- Known for: Circuit Court judge

Katherine Delahunt-O'Byrnes (28 April 1956 – 1 April 2015), was the first woman solicitor to become a Circuit Court judge in Ireland in 2001.

== Biography ==
Katherine Mary Delahunt was born to Tom Delahunt and Annette Doyle in Wicklow. She had four siblings. Delahunt-O'Byrnes attended the Dominican Convent in Wicklow before going on to study law in University College Cork. Delahunt-O'Byrnes qualified in 1979 aged 24 and just a year later became a partner in her law firm. She became an expert on employment law and as a result was selected as a vice-chair on the Employment Appeals Tribunal in 1986. In 2001 Delahunt-O'Byrnes was selected to become a Circuit Court judge becoming the first woman solicitor in Ireland to do so. It was expected she would go to higher courts but ill health prevented that. Her partner was Stephen O'Byrne. They married in 2015. She died the same year.
