= Silvia Correale =

Argentine-Italian lawyer

Silvia Monica Correale
- Born: Rosario, Argentina
- Occupation: Postulator

Doctor Silvia Monica Correale is an Argentine-Italian lawyer from Rosario, Santa Fe, Argentina. She is the first ever woman Postulator in the Vatican City, having worked there since graduating from university.

== Education ==
Corrale studied law at the Pontifical Catholic University of Argentina and then worked there as a professor of theology for three years. In 1988, she moved to Rome, Italy, to study for a degree in canon law at the Pontifical University of Saint Thomas Aquinas and became a doctor in canon law after graduating from the Pontifical Lateran University "Summa cum laude". She has used her qualifications to speak to the media on behalf of the Vatican in relation to canon law.

== Career ==
Corrale started working for the Holy See in 1992 as the Deputy Commissioner for the Defense of the Link in the Special Commission of Super Rato causes. She later came to be referred to as the "Decana de los Argentinos en Roma" (English: Dean of the Argentines in Rome) as she was the longest serving Argentine working in the Vatican City. In 2007, Pope Benedict XVI appointed her as the first female Postulator for the beatification department and the Congregation for the Causes of Saints. One of her first cases involved the beatification of Vietnamese Cardinal, François-Xavier Nguyên Van Thuân. As Postulator, she has focused her attention on the beatification of potential Argentine saints, becoming recognised as the specialist Postulator for Argentine cases. Since her appointment, there have been a number of additional female Postulators appointed to the Congregation for the Causes of Saints.
