= Julia Álvarez Resano =

Spanish lawyer, teacher and politician (1903–1948)

Civil Governor of the Province of Ciudad Real
- In office July 1937 – March 1938

Member of the Republican Cortes
- In office 1936–1939

Personal details
- Born: 10 August 1903 Villafranca, Spain
- Died: 19 May 1948 (aged 44) Mexico City, Mexico
- Party: Spanish Socialist Workers' Party
- Education: University of Zaragoza
- Occupation: Lawyer, jurist, school teacher, politician

Lorenza Julia Álvarez Resano (10 August 1903 – 19 May 1948) was a Spanish lawyer, teacher and politician. A member of the Spanish Socialist Workers' Party, she was a member of the Congress of Deputies of the Second Spanish Republic from 1936 to 1939. She was the first woman ever to assume the office of civil governor in Spain.

== Biography ==
Born on 10 August 1903 in Villafranca, Navarre. She earned a title in educational practice in the provincial capital Pamplona, later passing a public examination to the post of school teacher in 1923 in Zaragoza. Initially close to the Radical Socialist Republican Party, she later joined the Spanish Socialist Workers' Party (PSOE). She obtained a licentiate degree in Law at the University of Zaragoza in 1933.

She married Amancio Muñoz Zafra, also a lawyer and PSOE politician, in 1935.

After unsuccessfully running as PSOE candidate at the 1933 election, she was elected as member of the Republican Cortes in the constituency of Madrid–province at the 1936 election. In addition, she served as civil governor of the province of Ciudad Real during wartime (1937–1938).

Exiled to France, she helped to organise the Spanish Refugee Evacuation Service (SERE) on behalf of Juan Negrín. Adherent to the negrinista faction of the PSOE, fallen from grace after the end of the Civil War, she was expelled from the party in 1946 along Negrín and other followers. She was to be symbolically reinstated as member of the PSOE in 2009.

Ultimately exiled to Mexico in 1947, she died in Mexico City on 19 May 1948.
