= Lemmikki Kekomäki =

Finnish jurist (1902–1996)

Kaino Tuovi Lemmikki Kekomäki (née Yrjö-Koskinen; September 17, 1902 – April 8, 1996) was a Finnish lawyer who was elected as the first woman to become a member of the Supreme Administrative Court in 1956. She was born in Loppi.

With this appointment, Kekomäki became the first woman in the Nordic countries to be a senior judge. In 1960, she was the first woman to receive the Finnish White Rose Class I commander. In 1971, she became the Grand Cross of the Finnish Lion, the highest honor of the Order. Kekomäki died in Helsinki, at the age of 93.
