= Henny Magnussen =

Danish lawyer

Henny Sophie Magnussen - fair use image

Henny Sophie Magnussen née Petersen (1878–1937) was a Danish lawyer, the first woman to be permitted to work in the high courts of Denmark after successfully graduating from the University of Copenhagen in 1905. She rallied support from members of parliament which led to changes in the law in 1906 which allowed women law graduates the same privileges as men. In 1909, she was able to practise as a high court barrister. Nanna Berg who had received a legal diploma in 1887, was not authorized to work in the country's high courts but was restricted to the lower courts.

== Biography ==
Born in the Copenhagen district of Frederiksberg on 18 December 1878, Henny Sophie Petersen was the daughter of the farmer Jens Petersen (died 1924) and his wife Boline Buch (1839–1914). On 19 August 1913, she married the high court barrister Ove Knud Magnussen (1881–1973).

After matriculating from Gammelholm Latin- og Realskole, she studied law at the University of Copenhagen when permission was given to women to undertake the course. After she rallied the support of members of parliament, the minister of justice Peter Adler Alberti proposed changes in the regulations allowing women to serve as lawyers with the same privileges as men. As a result, Magnussen was able to join a legal firm in 1906. She encouraged members of parliament to support her attempt to be allowed to work in the high courts. Thanks to the support she received, she was able to practise in all the courts of Denmark from 1909, becoming the first woman to do so. She made a study trip to Oxford and London from September 1913 to March 1914.

For a number of years she worked with the high court attorneys Charles Shaw and Harald Dietrichson, finally setting up a practice of her own. She was able to attract many female clients, especially in connection with marital disputes and divorce cases. She headed the Copenhagen branch of the Danish Women's Society from 1907 to 1909.

Henny Magnussen died on 20 June 1937 in Copenhagen, after suffering from heart problems.
