= Maria Otto =

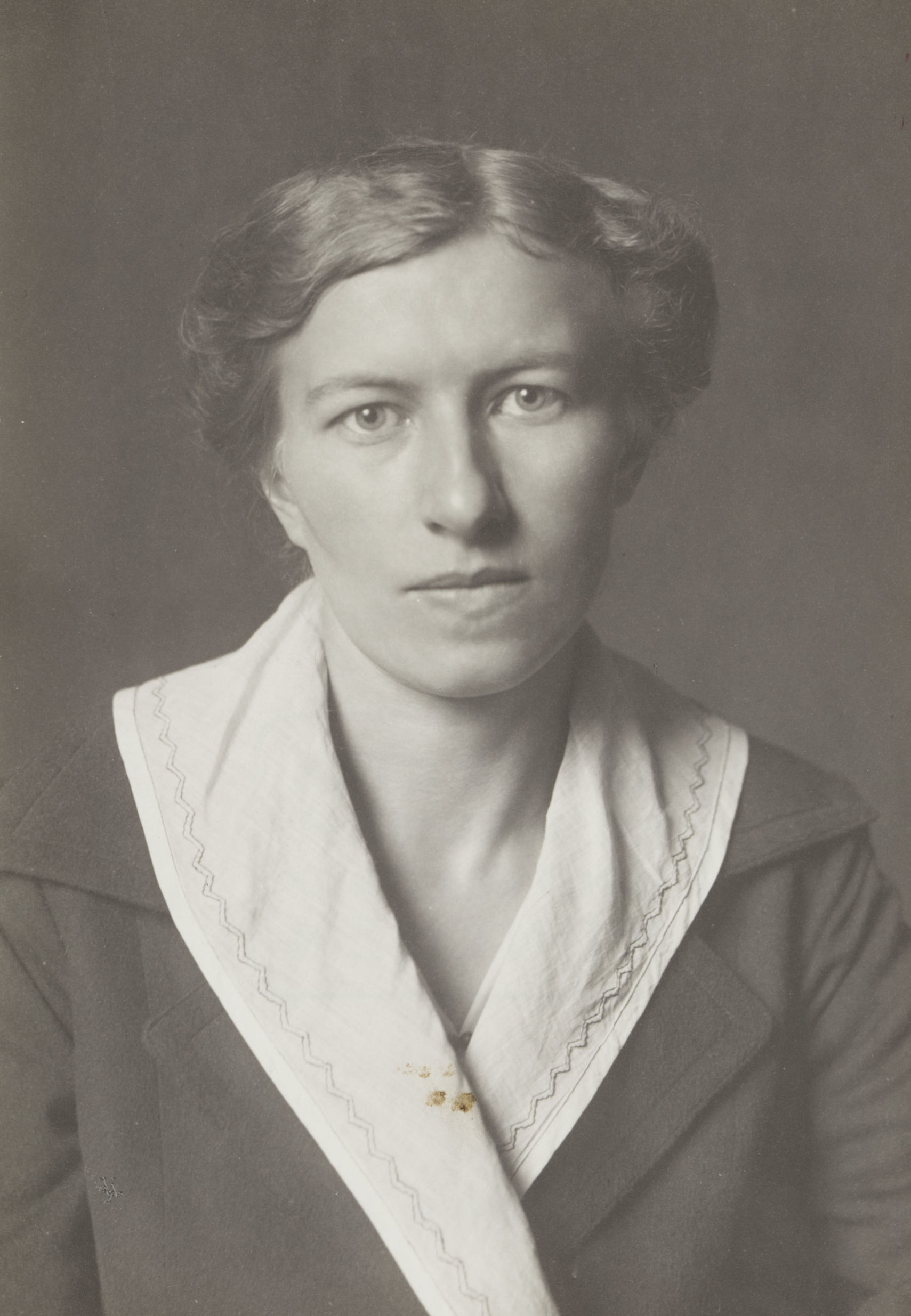
- Born: August 6, 1892; Weiden in der Oberpfalz, Kingdom of Bavaria, German Reich
- Died: December 20, 1972 (aged 80); Munich, West Germany
- Education: University of Würzburg
- Occupation: lawyer

Maria Otto (6 August 1892, Weiden in der Oberpfalz - 20 December 1977, Munich) was the first female attorney in Germany. Following the enactment of Germany's "Law on the Admission of Women to the Offices and Professions of Justice" on 11 July 1922, Maria Otto was admitted to the bar on 7 December 1922. Until her death in 1977, she worked as a lawyer in Munich.

Since 2010, the German Bar Association awards the Maria Otto award in her honor to distinguished female lawyers and organizations that have rendered outstanding services to the advancement of female jurists.
