= María Luisa Suárez Roldán =

Spanish lawyer and political activist

María Luisa Suárez Roldán (Madrid, 9 September 1920 - Madrid, 4 January 2019) was a Spanish lawyer of communist ideology, founding partner of the first employment law firm promoted by the PCE in Spain, which had a key role in the fight for democracy and freedom during the last years of Franco’s dictatorship.

== Biography ==
María Luisa Suárez Roldán was born in Madrid, within a Republican middle class family. She studied at the Institución Libre de Enseñanza, but the Spanish Civil War interrupted her studies. Eventually, in 1941 she could enroll in Law Studies at the Universidad Complutense of Madrid, where she was the only woman in the class. She completed her studies in 1944, being among the first three women to obtain a bachelor's degree in that department after the war.

In 1947 she married Fernando Ontañón Sarda, whom she had met at the ILE (Institución Libre de Enseñanza). Fernando Ontañón passed in 2008, and to him, to the «love of her life», she dedicated in 2011 her memoirs, Recuerdos, nostalgias y realidades ("Memories, nostalgia, and realities").

Her last book, Ensayo sobre el feminismo, was presented in 2014 for the first time and without her (as she was already 93 years old) by the employment lawyer Juan José del Águila at the Valle-Inclán Association. In this book, the writer makes an analysis and explanation of feminism from its origins back in the XIX century, with the fight to obtain the right to education, culture and the right to vote and be eligible by women. It goes to current times, setting out that there is still much to do to achieve equality in several areas, and she suggests some ways to get there.

She died in Madrid at the age of 98 assisted by her colleagues at the Valle Inclán neighbours association, of which she was a member. She had an adopted child, which in her memoirs she refers to as Taqui or Taki and who joined the tributes paid by the municipal council of Chamartín (in Madrid) on 14 May 2019.

== Professional career ==
In 1947 she joined the Madrid Lawyers Bar, one of the first females, together with Ascensión Chirivella –who had enrolled in University in 1922–, as in those years it was not easy for women to have a professional life, less so in the legal world. She started as a trainee in the law firm of Manuel Escobedo, at the time dean of the Madrid Bar, but their collaboration ended in 1955, as a consequence of dictator Francisco Franco being appointed honorary dean.

From 1956, she worked actively at the Bar activities, with a newly formed group of young lawyers that included people from different ideologies and parties, where she was known as a member of the Partido Comunista de España (PCE), that she had joined in 1954.

Towards the end of the 1950s and beginning of the 1960s, she started her career defending political prisoners, with regular visits to prisons, namely the prison of Burgos. Vicente Cazcarra, who was sentenced in 1961 to 17 years of imprisonment in a war trial, said "During those years of silence, solitude and death, cells and locks, guards and bars, you were a messenger of light for the prisoners, a heart in unison, a helping hand, the voice of our voice, the cry from our throats, encouragement and joy, a link to life, a song of hope, SONG OF HOPE".

She worked together with Alejandro Rebollo, lawyer of the army, in the defence of Julián Grimau, but she could not appear as a lawyer, as this was an military tribunal.

Towards the end of 1965, further to the call from Francisco Romero Marín, at the time head of the PCE in Spain and with the support of Marcelino Camacho and other union leads, the first employment law firm at calle de la Cruz, n.º 16 in Madrid was set up. Suárez Roldán was a founding partner, together with Antonio Montesinos, José Jiménez de Parga y Pepe Esteban. Eventually other similar law firms were set up, that were key in the fight for democracy and freedom during the last third of Franco’s dictatorship.

Suárez Roldán joined the lawyers conferences of Valencia in 1954, where, for the first time, the government was asked to unify jurisdictions, with the abolition of the military jurisdiction, which at that time tried political crimes. Years later, at the León Congress in 1970, the request for amnesty and regulation of the situation of political prisoners was approved by a large majority.

From the incorporation of the Special Jurisdiction for Public Order, towards the end of 1963, until it finally disappear in January 1977, Suárez Roldán had a very active role as counsel to defendants before the Tribunal de Orden Público. She defended 147 defendants, most of them workers and students from Madrid. She was also very active before the Employment Courts. Once CC.OO. was legalised, she kept her work as legal counsellor, both in Madrid and Avila, until. Her professional file was recorded and published by the 1 May Foundation, of CC.OO., and it is part of the sources of history for the civil war.

== Tributes and awards ==
Suárez Roldán received several honours both during her life and after she passed:

- 1985ː Orden de San Raimundo de Peñafort.
- 1986ː Golden medal to Work.
- 2005ː Award of the Fundación Abogados de Atocha, for her work leading the law firm at calle de la Cruz, the first employment and labour law firm in Spain.
- 2006ː Award Irene Falcón granted by the Women Section of the party Izquierda Unida of the Madrid Region.
- 2019ː Acknowledgement from the Madrid Town Hall setting up a plaque in the building where she lived.
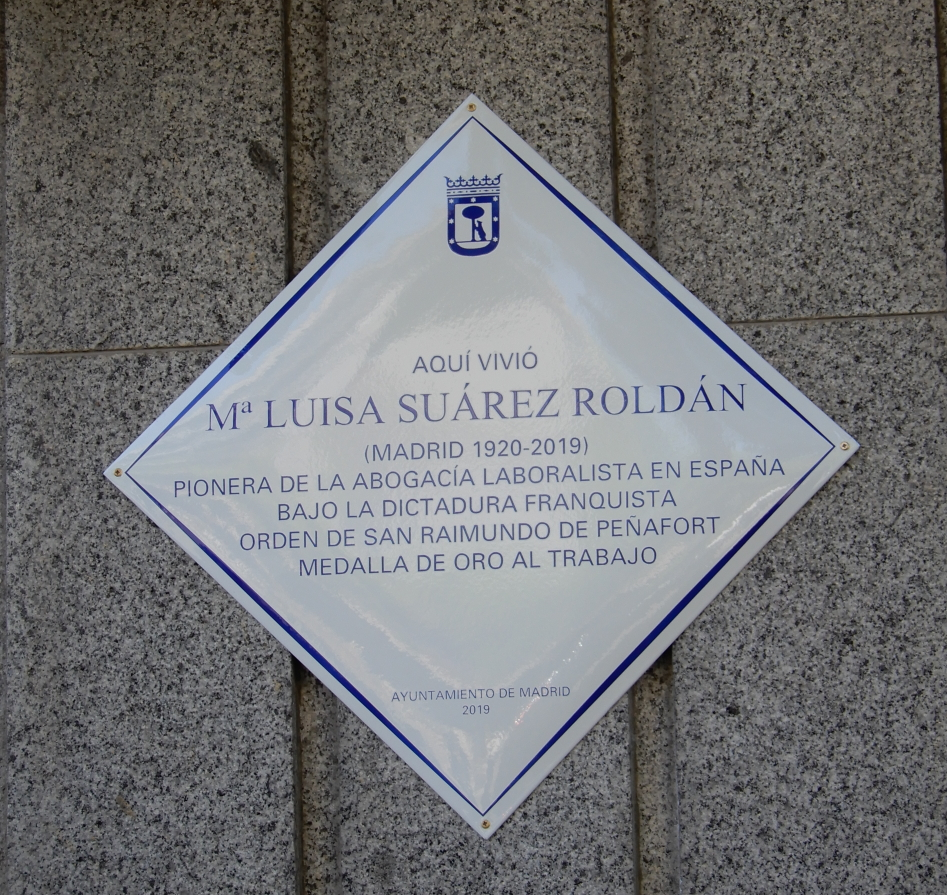
  Plaque in honor of Roldán

== Bibliography ==
- B. DE LA CUADRA, «María Luisa Suárez, fundadora de los despachos laboralistas en la etapa franquista...», en El País , jueves 18 de julio de 1985, pág. 48;
- J. M DE LLANOS, «Conversaciones con María Luisa Suárez Roldan», en Mundo Obrero, 25 de julio de 1985;
- M. CAMACHO ABAD, Confieso que he luchado. Memorias, Madrid, Temas de Hoy, 1990;
- M. FERNÁNDEZ, I. JIMÉNEZ y J. A. DE MINGO, Demandas obreras y Tribunales Franquistas. Catálogo del Fondo de María Luisa Suárez; abogada laboralista de la oposición (1963-1982), Madrid, Fundación 1.º de Mayo. Archivo Histórico de CC.OO., 1991;
- F. ROMEU ALFARO, El Silencio Roto. Mujeres contra el franquismo, Oviedo, 1994, págs. 247 y 248;
- V. CAZCARRA, Era la Hora Tercia. Testimonio de la resistencia antifranquista, Zaragoza, Una Luna Ediciones, 2000;
- J. J. DEL ÁGUILA, EI TOP, La Represión de la libertad (1963-1977), Barcelona, Editorial Planeta, 2001, pág. 422.
