= Anna Felice =

Maltese judge

Anna Felice is a Maltese judge. Alongside Abigail Lofaro, she became one of the first female judges in Malta in 2006.

== See also ==
- Judiciary of Malta
