= Johanna Clementina Hudig =

Dutch judge

Johanna Clementina Hudig ONL

Judge of the District Court of Rotterdam
- In office 1947–1977

Personal details
- Born: March 27, 1907 Groningen, Netherlands
- Died: June 29, 1996 (aged 89)
- Occupation: Judge, Professor
- Known for: Being the first female judge of the Netherlands

Johanna Clementina Hudig, (Groningen, 27 March 1907 - Amersfoort, 29 July 1996) was the first female judge in the Netherlands. From 1947 to 1977, she was a juvenile judge attached to the District Court of Rotterdam. From 1957 to 1972, she was attached to the University of Utrecht as extraordinary professor of children's rights and child protection.

== Education and career ==
Hudig was born to Joost Hudig (1880-1967), an agricultural consultant and professor, and Sophia Alida Hudig (1880-1924). She was a granddaughter of Jan Hudig and a niece of Ferrand Whaley Hudig (1883-1937). Han Hudig remained unmarried.

Hudig attended the all-girls' HBS (higher general secondary school) in Groningen. Since this program did not provide access to university, she subsequently took the state exams at the gymnasium (higher general secondary education). Hudig studied law in Utrecht, earning her Master of Laws degree in 1934. After graduating, she took an unpaid position at the Criminological Institute, which had just been founded by W.P.J. Pompe. In 1939, she received her doctorate with a thesis entitled "The Criminality of Women" (1939). In 1938, she began working in Rotterdam as an inspector with the juvenile police. In 1946, she resigned from the Rotterdam police force. From 1946 to 1947, she studied sociology and social work at the University of Chicago. From 1947 to 1977, she served as a juvenile judge at the Rotterdam District Court, the first female judge in the Netherlands. From 1957 to 1972, she was a professor by special appointment in children's law and child protection at Utrecht University.

Hudig served on the boards of various youth protection institutions. From 1948 to 1972, she was also a board member of the Rotterdam-based Stichting Bevordering van Volkskracht

== Legacy ==
- In 1964, Hudig was knighted en masse in the Order of the Netherlands Lion.
- In 1977, she received the Wolfert van Borselen Medal from the municipality of Rotterdam.
- In 1979, she received an honorary doctorate from the Catholic University of Nijmegen.
- On March 8, 2023, Utrecht University announced that the building at Achter Sint Pieter 200 was successfully named after her. The renovated Johanna Hudig Building was completed in the week of Monday, January 15, 2024.
