= Helena Early =

First woman solicitor to practice in Ireland

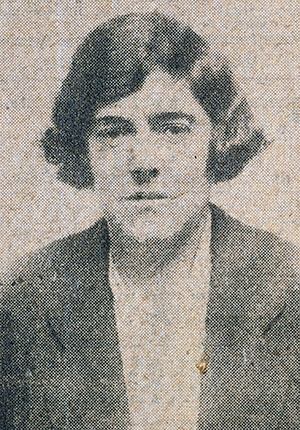
- from Freeman’s Journal, 30 June 1923
- Born: 1 April 1888; Swords, County Dublin, Ireland
- Died: 1 August 1977 (age 89); Blackrock, Dublin, Ireland
- Occupation(s): Solicitor, auditor, Commissioner of Oaths

Helena Mary Early (1 April 1888 – 1 August 1977) was the first woman solicitor to practice in Ireland.

== Early life ==
Helena Early was born to Peter Early and Mary Ann Reilly on 1 April 1888 in Swords, County Dublin. Her older brothers John and Thomas were solicitors.

== Career ==
Early worked as a law clerk for her brother and placed first in the Preliminary Examination in January 1920. She later came first in the Intermediate Examination and fourth in the Final. Early was indentured to her brother on 22 June 1920 after applying for a practicing certificate in 1919. She was admitted to the Roll of Solicitors in 1923. However, Dorothea Heron was the first woman to join the roll of solicitors, on the 17 April 1923.

In 1920 Early was the first woman auditor of the Solicitors' Apprentices Debating Society. She saved the Society's records in 1923, when the records office was burned. She was the first woman in Ireland to hold the title Commissioner of Oaths. Early and her brother Thomas had a practice on O’Connell Street, Dublin. In 1923, after one of her first court appearances, the justice "congratulated her on the able manner in which she had conducted her case."

Early was politically active. In 1928, she proposed fines for the parents of truant youth in Dublin. She spoke in favor of women police officers (gardai) in 1943. Early was President of the Ireland–U.S.S.R. Friendship Society, which was active through the 1950s. Early retired during the 1960s.

== Later years ==
Her brother and law partner Thomas Early died in 1958. In 1970, Helena Early was described as a competitive bridge and golf player, and "a spry old lady who smokes sixty cigarettes a day." She died in 1977, at the age of 89, in Blackrock, Dublin.
