= Gönül Başaran Erönen =

Gönül Başaran Erönen (born 1953 in London, United Kingdom) has been the first female district judge in Cyprus, in 1980, and the first female justice of the Northern Cyprus Supreme Court in 1994.

== Biography ==
A London native, Erönen was born in 1953. Her mother and father, Sema and Orhan Başaran, were Turkish Cypriots who emigrated to the London in 1950; they had five children, of which Erönen was the only daughter. Inspired by watching her father working as a translator at the Old Bailey, Erönen decided at the age of seven to pursue a career in law. At the age of 22 Erönen qualified as a barrister from the Council of Legal Education as a Member of the Honourable Society of the Gray's Inn.

In 1975, Erönen immigrated to Cyprus and in 1976 began establishing her career in the legal field, while also taking on employment as a part-time English newsreader on Bayrak Television, a position she would retain until 1980. In 1976, she passed the Turkish Cypriot Bar Examinations and undertook a pupillage with Ümit Süleyman Onan. In 1977, she opened her own practice, and three years later became the first female District Judge in Cyprus. In 1986, she was distinguished as the Senior District Judge, and in 1992 she became its president. Erönen broke ground again in 1994 when she was elevated to the Turkish Cypriot Supreme Court Bench as its first female, as well as its youngest, justice. She retired after 31 years of service.

== Personal life ==
In 1977, she married Yücem Erönen who is an architect. She has two sons named Orhan and Enver.

== Awards ==
- 1999- "Most Successful Woman in the Legal field"
- 2000- "Daughters of Ataturk Turco-North Cyprus Woman Achievement Award"

== Notable cases involving Erönen ==
- Varnava and Others v. Turkey ECHR

== See also ==
- First women lawyers around the world
