= Ascensión Chirivella Marín =

Ascensión Chirivella Marín (Valencia, Spain, 28 January 1894 - Mexico, 1980) was the first female law graduate in Spain to practice as a lawyer. She specialized in civil law and was active in promoting women's rights, defending the benefits that the Second Republic promised to women: the right to vote, to hold political positions, to divorce, and envisioning the payment of child support, non-discrimination against women in parental rights, and in being widowed and remarried, unlike what is in the Civil Code of 1889.
