= Soledad Cazorla =

Spanish jurist

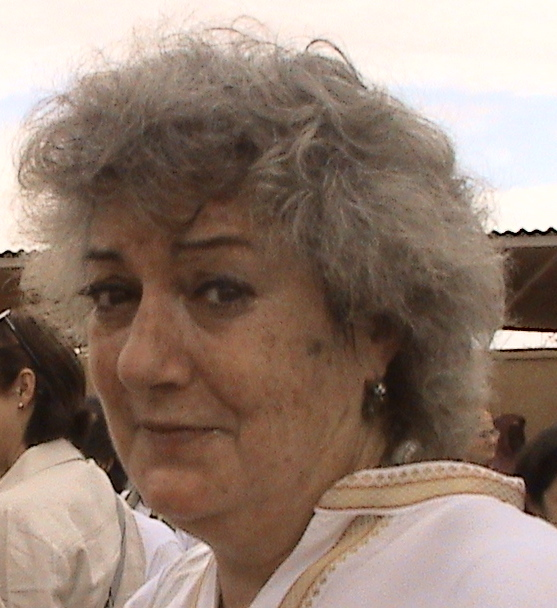
Soledad Cazorla Prieto

Soledad Cazorla Prieto (19 February 1955 – 4 May 2015) was a jurist and the first Spanish prosecutor against gender violence. She directed a network of fiscal specialists who worked in this field in Spain after the creation of the 2004 Integral Law against Gender Violence. She held the position for a decade, from 2005 until her death. she advocated for equality and her professional career was closely linked to the development of this law.

== Biography ==
Cazorla was born in 1955 in Larache, then a Spanish protectorate in Morocco, where her family had emigrated at the close of the 19th century. Her father was a military officer of high rank. Her older brother, Luis María Cazorla, is also a jurist. She started her career in 1981 at the Fiscalía of Girona. In 1984, she moved to Valladolid. In 1985, she joined the Audiencia Territorial de Madrid, followed by the Inspection Office of the Fiscalía General del Estado in 1993, and afterwards, the Secretaría Técnica.

In September 1996, she was appointed public prosecutor of the High Court, where she gained, between other responsibilities, a public indictment against Mario Conde in the Banesto case.

In 2005, she rose to Public Prosecutor in the Section against Violence towards Woman she had proposed to the fiscal general of the State, Cándido Conde-Pumpido, and in October 2010, she was re-appointed. The section formed part of the Observation Against Gender Violence.

Intervention of Soledad Cazorla on the Integral Law against Gender Violence in Spain. Niger 2008

Cazorla participated in international meetings in defence of women's rights (France, United Kingdom, Morocco, Dominican Republic, Bolivia, Ecuador, China or Niger) as a national jurist, collaborating in publications and articles concerning different matters related with Penal Laws.

Cazorla was married to the journalist Joaquín Tagar and had 3 children. She died of stroke in Madrid on 4 May 2015

== Recognition ==
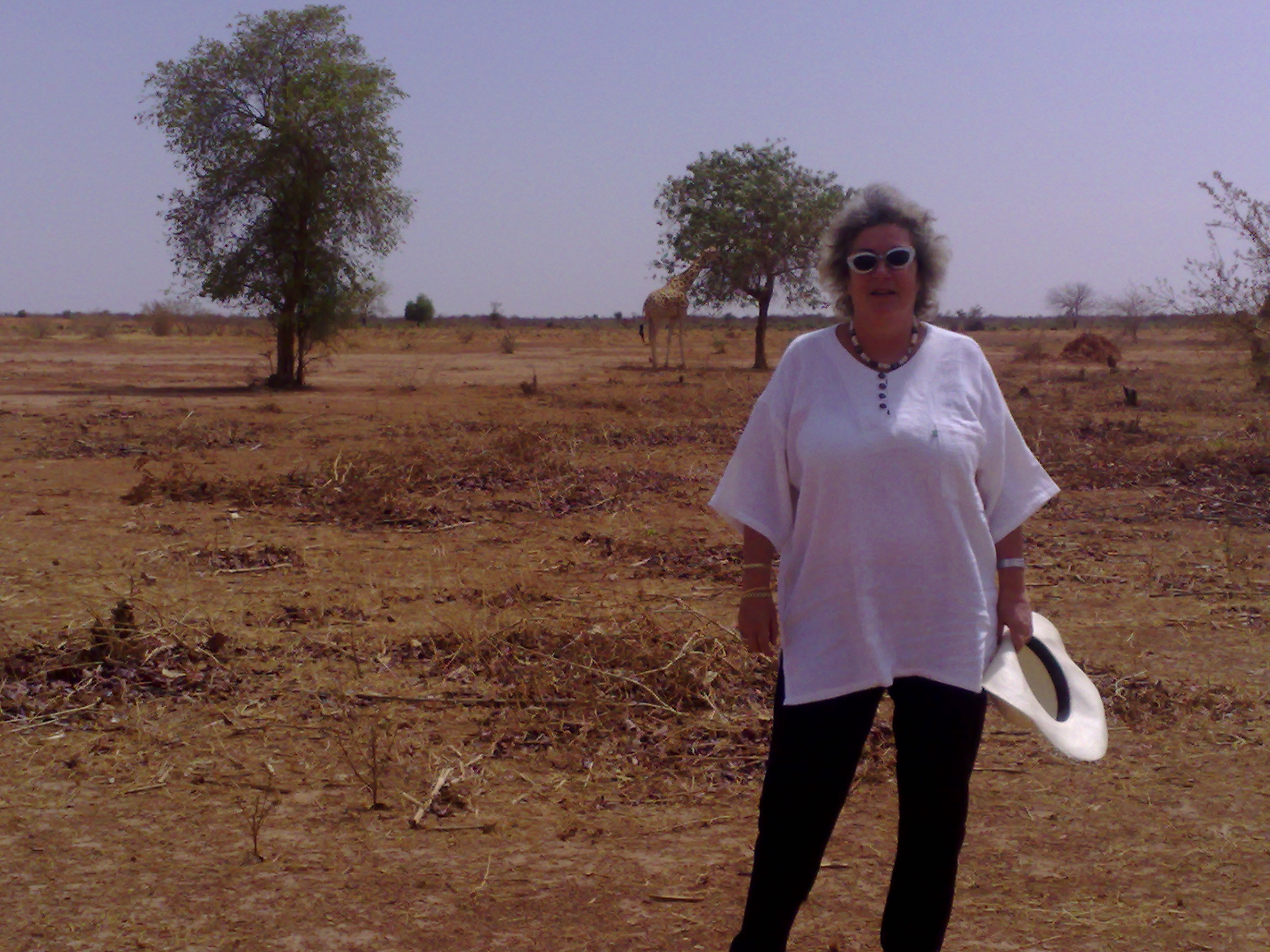
Photograph during a trip to Niger in 2008 for the celebration of the Third Meeting of Spanish and African women.

- 2014: Medal of Honour from the School of Lawyers of Madrid.
- November 2008: recognition of her work in the fight against Gender Violence awarded by the Ministry of Equality.
- October 2015, inaugurated of the third Summit of Women Jurists
- February 2016, the XI Edition of the Prizes of the Observatory against the domestic Violence and of gender 2016, were allocated to recognise her work.
- February 2016, a scholarship fund was created for the personal development, educational support and life improvement of girls and boys who have lost their mother owing to gender violence.
