= Abigail Lofaro =

Maltese judge (born 1961)

Judiciary of Malta
- Incumbent
- Assumed office 5 September 2006

Personal details
- Born: September 16, 1961 (age 65)
- Education: University of Malta

Abigail Lofaro née Attard (born 16 September 1961 in Bormla) is a Maltese judge.

== Biography ==
=== Studies ===
Born Abigail Attard, she studied at De La Salle College and read law at the University of Malta, obtaining a diploma of Notary Public in December 1982 and a LL.D. in April 1984 with a dissertation on marriage annulment. The following month she joined the bar.

She later also obtained a diploma in canonical marriage cases, jurisprudence and procedure in 1995 from the Metropolitan Tribunal of the Archdiocese of Malta, and a magister juris degree in European and Comparative Law in 2001 from the University of Malta with a thesis in competition law on “The Concept of Dominance as Applied in Telecommunications Regulation”.

=== Career ===
In 1984-1986 Abigal Attard worked as legal counsel to the Housing Department, also sitting on the Social Housing Board. In 1987-1990 she was legal counsel at the Law Revision Commission chaired by Edgar Mizzi, working on the codification of the updated Laws of Malta. In 1990-1991 she was Private Secretary to the Parliamentary Secretary responsible for Housing, advising on housing laws and policy.

In the following years she practiced at the Grech and Associates law firm, focusing on civil, commercial and family Law cases, and also pleading with the church tribunal in marriage annulment cases.

=== Member of the Judiciary ===
==== Magistrate ====
In January 1996 Abigail Lofaro was appointed Magistrate by Prime Minister Eddie Fenech Adami.

In May 2004, Magistrate Lofaro was appointed by the Deputy Prime Minister, based on the Inquiries Act, to examine the procedure that had led to the deportation of Eritrean citizens from Malta in September/October 2002. She submitted her report in September 2004.

==== Judge ====
In September 2006 Lofaro was appointed Judge by Prime Minister Lawrence Gonzi. Alongside Anna Felice, she was the first female judge appointed in Malta. Lofaro tried civil and commercial cases and first-instance constitutional redress applications, also sitting in various cases on the Court of Appeal and on the Court of Criminal Appeal.

Since 2010 she is ad hoc Judge for Malta to the European Court of Human Rights in Strasbourg.

In June 2011 Lofaro was assigned to the family section of the civil court, dealing with cases of divorce, separation, marriage annulment, custody, maintenance, paternity, filiation and abduction, presiding over mediation proceedings, and issuing decrees on parental responsibility, custody, access, maintenance and cases of expulsion of a spouse from the matrimonial home in cases of domestic violence. In these cases, she regularly apply the Istanbul Convention, the Convention on the Rights of the Child and the European Convention on Human Rights. She was appointed President of the Family Court in June 2018.

In 2011-2012, Lofaro also served as President of the European Association of Labour Court Judges (EALCJ).

Starting in January 2013, Lofaro joined the Court of Criminal Appeal.

In July 2018, Lofaro was appointed Hague Network Judge in respect of Malta.

=== Private life ===
She is married to Dr Pierre Lofaro, and they have a daughter.

Madam Justice Lofaro is also honorary president of the Lourdes Band Club, Qrendi.
