= Helena (given name) =

- Pronunciation: English: /ˈhɛlənə/ HEL-ə-nə; German: [ˈhɛlena] Dutch: [ɦeːˈleːnaː] Czech: [ˈɦɛlɛna] Brazilian Portuguese: [eˈlenɐ], European Portuguese: [iˈlenɐ]
- Gender: Female

Origin
- Origin: Greek
- Meaning: Light or Bright

Other names
- Related names: Helen, Helene, Elena, Elene, Ilana

Helena is a given name. It is the Latinised form of Helen. Notable people with this name include:

== Ancients ==
=== Mononyms ===
- Helen of Troy, ak. in Latin as Helena, a figure in Greek mythology
- Helena of Egypt, 4th century BC painter
- Helena of Adiabene (died c. 56), Assyrian queen
- Helena, mother of Constantine I (died 330), Roman empress and a Christian saint
- Helena (wife of Julian) (died 360), Roman empress
- Helena (niece of Justin II), niece of Empress Sophia of the Byzantine Empire
- Helena (daughter of Alypius), (960s–c. 989) Byzantine empress consort
- Helena (daughter of Robert Guiscard) (fl. 1076–1081, born Olympias), fiancée of Constantine Doukas
- Saint Helena of Serbia (died 1314), Serbian queen

=== Full names ===
- Helena Lekapene, (c.910–961), daughter of Romanos I Lekapenos and empress consort of Constantine VII
- Helena Kantakouzene (1333–1396), daughter of John VI Kantakouzenos and empress consort of John V Palaiologos
- Helena Dragaš (c. 1372–1450) daughter of Konstantin Dejanović and empress consort of Manuel II Palaiologos
- Helena Scheuberin (fl. 1485), Austrian defendant of 1485 witch trial

== Modern ==
- Helena Bonguela Abel (born 1957), Angolan teacher and politician
- Helena Åberg (born 1971), Swedish swimmer
- Helena Adler (1983–2024), Austrian writer
- Helena Charlotta Åkerhielm (1786–1828), Swedish dramatist and translator
- Helena Aksela, Finnish physicist
- Helena Almeida (1934–2018), Portuguese photographer
- Helena Alterby (born 1978), Swedish golfer and administrator
- Helena Alviar Garcia, Colombian legal academic
- Helena Amutenya, Namibian military officer
- Helena André (born 1960), Portuguese politician
- Helena Andresen (born 2001), Danish politician
- Helena Andrews (born 1986), American writer
- Helena Anhava (1925–2018), Finnish writer and translator
- Helena Anliot (born 1956), Swedish tennis player
- Helena Antipoff (1892–1974), Brazilian psychologist
- Helena Araújo (1934–2015), Colombian writer
- Helena Arizmendi (1927–2015), Argentine opera singer
- Helena Arnell (1697–1751), Finnish artist
- Helena Asamoah-Hassan, Ghanaian librarian
- Helena Rosendahl Bach (born 2000), Danish freestyle swimmer
- Héléna Bailly (born 2002), Belgian singer
- Helena Barbagelata, Italian-Israeli multidisciplinary artist, writer, researcher and activist
- Helena Bargholtz (born 1942), Swedish politician
- Helena Barlow (born 1998), English actress
- Helena Basilova (born 1983), classical pianist
- Helena Beatson (1762–1839), Scottish artist
- Helena Bell (born 1981), American accountant
- Helena Benitez (1914–2016), Filipino senator and civic leader
- Helena Benítez de Zapata (1915–2009), Colombian songwriter, politician, teacher, and journalist
- Helena Bergman (born 1985), Swedish orienteer
- Helena Bergström (born 1964), Swedish actress
- Helena Bešović (born 1984), Bosnian tennis player
- Helena Blackman (born 1982), British musical theatre actress
- Helena Blavatsky (1831–1891), Russian writer
- Helena Błażusiakówna (1926–1999), Polish World War II prisoner
- Helena Bleicher (born 1998), German beauty queen
- Helena Bliss (1917–2014), American actress
- Helena Bochořáková-Dittrichová (1894–1980), Czech illustrator, graphic novelist and painter
- Helena Boettcher, Polish luger
- Helena Boguszewska (1883–1978), Polish writer
- Helena Bonet Rosado, Spanish archaeologist
- Helena Bonham Carter (born 1966), English actress
- Helena Born, British-American anarchist
- Helena Bouveng (born 1962), Swedish politician
- Helena Božić (born 1997), Montenegrin footballer
- Helena Brander (1872–1953), Finnish politician
- Helena Braun (1903–1990), German soprano
- Helena Breck, British actor
- Helena Brodin (born 1936), Swedish actress
- Helena Brodin (sailor) (born 1970), Swedish sailor
- Helena Brown (politician), American politician
- Helena Brunner, Australian Paralympic swimmer
- Helena Buczyńska (1894–1957), Polish actress
- Helena Bukowska-Szlekys (1899–1954), Polish sculptor
- Helena Bulaja (born 1971), Croatian multimedia artist, director and animator
- Helena Buljan (born 1941), Croatian actress
- Helena Bušová (1914–1986), Czech actress
- Helena Carr (1946–2023), Australian businesswoman
- Helena Carreiras (born 1965), Portuguese politician, academic and sociologist
- Helena Carrión, Spanish actress
- Helena Carroll (1928–2013), Scottish stage, film and television actress
- Helena Carter (1923–2000), American actress
- Helena Casas (born 1988), Spanish cyclist
- Helena Catt, UK-born New Zealand public servant
- Helena Cehak-Holubowiczowa (1902–1979), Polish archaeologist
- Helena Černohorská (born 1970), Czech biathlete
- Helena Chagas (born 1961), Brazilian journalist
- Helena Chan (born 1989), Hong Kong-Swedish presenter and fashion model
- Helena Modjeska Chase (1900–1986), American artist and writer
- Helena Cholewicka (1848–1883), Polish "prima ballerina assoluta"
- Helena Christensen (born 1968), Danish model
- Héléna Ciak (born 1989), French basketball player
- Helena Citrónová (1922–2007), Slovak holocaust survivor
- Helena B. Cobb (1869–1922), American educator and missionary
- Helena Cobban (born 1952), British-born American writer
- Helena Coleman (1860–1953), Canadian poet, music teacher and writer
- Helena Concannon (1878–1952), Irish politician and writer
- Helena Cooper-Thomas, New Zealand academic
- Helena Corbellini (born 1959), Uruguayan writer and producer
- Helena Corrêa de Barros (1910–2000), Portuguese photographer
- Helena Cortesina (1903–1984), Spanish film director, actor, producer and theatrical entrepreneur
- Helena Costa (born 1978), Portuguese football manager
- Helena Crevar (born 2007), American submission grappler
- Helena Cronin, British Darwinian philosopher and rationalist
- Helena Dąbrowska (1923–2003), Polish actress
- Helena Dahlbäck (1960–2000), Swedish author
- Helena Dahlström (born 1968), Swedish tennis player
- Helena Dalli (born 1962), Maltese politician
- Helena Dam á Neystabø (born 1955), Faroese politician
- Héléna Arsène Darmesteter (c. 1850–1940), British painter
- Helena Deland Canadian songwriter, composer, singer and musician
- Helēna Demakova (born 1959), Latvian politician
- Helena Demczuk, Australian painter
- Helena Deneke (1878–1973), English Germanist
- Helena Dix (born 1979), Australian opera soprano
- Helena Dollimore (born 1994), British politician
- Helena Dow (1917–1998), American fencer
- Helena Dretar Karić (born 1979), Croatian para table tennis player
- Helena Duailibe (born 1958), Brazilian physician and politician
- Helena Dudley (1858–1932), American social worker, labor organizer and pacifist
- Helena Dunicz-Niwińska (1915–2018), Polish violinist
- Helena Dunlap (1876–1955), American maritime painter
- Helena Dvořáková (born 1979), Czech actress
- Helena Dyrssen (born 1959), Swedish jurist and politician
- Helena Early (1888–1977), first woman solicitor to practice in Ireland
- Helena Edlund (born 1960), Swedish professor
- Helena Ehrenmalm, Finnish landowner
- Helena Maria Ehrenstråhle, Swedish noblewoman and poet
- Helena Ejeson (born 1981), Swedish tennis player
- Helena Ekblom (1784–1859), Swedish preacher
- Helena Ekholm (born 1984), Swedish biathlete
- Helena Eldrup, Swedish educator
- Helena Elinder (born 1973), Swedish fencer
- Helena Elver (born 1998), Danish handball player
- Helena Emingerová (1858–1943), Czech painter
- Helena Engman (born 1976), Swedish shot putter
- Helena Erbenová (born 1979), Czech skier and triathlete
- Helena Eriksson (born 1962), Swedish poet
- Helena Errington (born 2005), New Zealand footballer
- Helena Espinosa Berea (c. 1895 – c. 1960), Mexican academic
- Helena Espvall, Swedish-American musician
- Helena Faucit (1817–1898), English actress
- Helena Fernandes (born 1967), Brazilian actress
- Helena Fibingerová (born 1949), Czech shot putter
- Helena Flam (born 1951), Polish-born sociologist
- Helena Fliśnik (1952–1999), Polish sprinter
- Helena M. L. Forbes (1900–1959), Scottish botanist
- Helena Forti (1884–1943), German opera singer
- Helena Foulkes (born 1964), American businessperson
- Helena Fourment (1614–1673), second wife of Peter Paul Rubens
- Helena Frisk (born 1965), Swedish politician
- Helena Fromm (born 1987), German taekwondo practitioner
- Helena Fuchsová (1965–2021), Czech runner
- Helena Gąsienica Daniel (1934–2013), Polish cross-country skier
- Helena Gasson (born 1994), New Zealand swimmer
- Helena Gellerman (born 1960), Swedish politician
- Lady Helena Gleichen (1873–1947), English painter
- Helena Gloag (1909–1973), Scottish actress
- Helena da Gloria, Mozambican politician
- Helena Theresa Goessmann, American lecturer, academic and writer
- Helena Elisabeth Goudeket (1910–1943), Dutch painter and illustrator
- Helena Groot, Colombian scientist
- Helena Grossówna (1904–1994), Polish actress and dancer
- Helena Grozer (born 1988), Czech volleyball player
- Helena Grundberg (born 1972), Swedish figure skater
- Helena Gualinga (born 2002), Ecuadorian activist
- Helena Guergis (born 1969), Canadian politician
- Helena Gutteridge (1879–1960), Canadian labor activist
- Helena Hamerow (born 1961), British archaeologist
- Helena Hansen, American psychiatrist
- Helena Hauff, German DJ
- Helena Hayes, American politician
- Helena R. Hellwig Pouch (1874–1960), American tennis player
- Helena Helmersson (born 1973), Swedish business executive
- Helena Henschen (1940–2011), Swedish designer and writer
- Helena Hernmarck, Swedish tapestry artist
- Helena Heuser (born 1996), Danish model
- Helena Hietanen (born 1963), Finnish artist
- Helena Hill Weed (1875–1958), American suffragette and geologist
- Helena Höij (born 1965), Swedish politician
- Helena Horká (born 1981), Czech volleyball player
- Helena Houdová (born 1979), Czech model
- Helena Howard (born 1998), American actress
- Helena Hummasten (born 1959), Swedish Muslim leader
- Helena Ignez (born 1942), Brazilian actress and filmmaker
- Helena Isdell (1888–1915), New Zealand nurse
- Helena Jaczek (born 1950), Canadian politician and physician
- Helena Jäderblom (born 1958), Swedish jurist and civil servant
- Helena Jaklitsch (born 1977), Slovenian historian
- Helena Janeczek (born 1964), author
- Helena Javornik (born 1966), Slovenian long-distance runner
- Helena Jessie, Irish singer
- Helena Jiranová (born 1995), Czech athletics competitor
- Helena Jobim (1931–2015), Brazilian writer
- Helena Johansson, Swedish singer-songwriter
- Helena Jones (1870–1946), British suffragette
- Helena Jonsson (born 1965), Swedish county governor
- Helena Josefsson (born 1978), Swedish singer
- Helena Jungwirth (1945–2023), Swedish opera singer
- Helena Juntunen (born 1976), Finnish operatic soprano
- Helena Kadare (born 1943), Albanian author
- Helena Kagan (1889–1978), Israeli pediatrician
- Helena Kallenbäck (born 1944), Swedish actress
- Helena Kallianiotes (born 1938), Greek-American film actress
- Helena Kannus (born 1963), Estonian para athletics competitor
- Helena Kara (1916–2002), Finnish actress
- Helena Kaut-Howson, British theatre director
- Helena de Kay Gilder (1846–1916), American illustrator and artist
- Helena Keith-Falconer, Countess of Kintore (1878–1971), American heiress
- Helena Kekkonen, Finnish peace activist and pioneer
- Helena Kennedy, Baroness Kennedy of The Shaws (born 1950), Scottish barrister, broadcaster and Labour member of the House of Lords
- Helena Khan (1927–2019), Bengali educationalist and writer
- Helena Kida (born 1971), Mozambican judicial magistrate
- Helena Kirkorowa (1828–1900), Polish actress
- Helena Kirop (born 1976), Kenyan long-distance runner
- Helena Klakocar (born 1958), Croatian artist alternative cartoonist
- Helena Klange (born 1968), Swedish curler
- Helena Kmieć (1991–2017), Polish missionary
- Helena Knyazeva (born 1959), Russian philosopher
- Helena Kolody (1912–2004), Brazilian writer and poet
- Helena Konanz (born 1961), Canadian politician and tennis player
- Helena Konttinen (1871–1916), Finnish prophet
- Helena van der Kraan (1940–2020), Czechoslovak-born Dutch photographer
- Helena Chmura Kraemer (fl. 1960s–2010s), American biostatistician
- Helena Krajčiová (born 1975), Slovak actress and singer
- Helena Krasowska, Polish slavist
- Helena Kružíková (1928–2021), Czech actress
- Helena Krzemieniewska (1878–1966), Polish botanist and microbiologist
- Helena Kuipers-Rietberg (1893–1944), Dutch resistance fighter
- Helena Kuo (c. 1911–1999), Chinese-American writer and translator
- Helena Kurnatowska (1929–2005), Polish politician
- Helena Kuusisto (born 1992), Finnish karateka
- Helena Laine (born 1955), Finnish athlete
- Helena Langšádlová (born 1963), Czech politician
- Helena Larsdotter Westerlund (1799–1865), Swedish educator
- Helena Blach Lavrsen (born 1963), Danish curler
- Helena Leander (born 1982), Swedish politician
- Helena Lefroy (1820–1908), Irish botanist
- Helena Legido-Quigley, Spanish public health researcher
- Helena Lehtinen (born 1952), Finnish jeweller and teacher
- Helena Lewczynska (born 1992), English badminton player
- Helena Lewyn (1889–1980), American pianist
- Helena Lindahl (born 1972), Swedish politician
- Helena Lindelia (died 1710), Swedish artist
- Helena Lingham (born 1963), Swedish curler
- Helena Lisická (1930–2009), Czech ethnographer and writer of fairy tales and legends
- Helena Lloret (born 1992), Spanish water polo player
- Helena Znaniecki Lopata (1925–2003), Polish-born American sociologist, author and researcher
- Helena Lopes da Silva (1948–2018), Cape Verdean surgeon and anti-colonialist activist
- Helena Lucas (born 1975), British Paralympic sailor
- Helena Luke (died 2024), Indian actress
- Helena Lumbreras (1935–1995), Spanish filmmaker and screenwriter
- Helena Lundbäck (born 1976), Swedish equestrian
- Helena Macher (born 1937), Polish luger
- Helena Magenbuch (1523–1597), German pharmacist
- Helena Majdaniec (1941–2002), Polish singer and film actor
- Helena Makowska (1893–1964), Polish actress
- Helena Maleno (born 1970), Spanish Moroccan human rights defender
- Helena Malheim (1716–1795), Swedish midwife
- Helena Malikova, European civil servant and academic
- Helena Malířová (1877–1940), Czech writer, journalist and translator
- Helena Maliszewska (Lili Larys) (1909–1986), Polish dancer
- Helena Mannervesi, Finnish orienteering competitor
- Héléna Manson (1898–1994), French actress
- Helena Marfell (1896–1981), Australian politician
- Helena Markson, British printmaker
- Helena Mas, Andorran psychologist and politician
- Helena Apolonia Massalska, Polish aristocrat and diarist
- Helena Matheopoulos, Greek journalist, author and opera authority
- Helena Mattsson (born 1984), Swedish actress
- Helena McAuliffe-Ennis (born 1951), Irish politician
- Helena Meirelles (1924–2005), Brazilian musician
- Helena de Menezes (1927–2020), Brazilian sprinter
- Helena Mercier (1839–1910), Dutch social-liberal feminist
- Helena Merriman, British journalist and broadcaster
- Helena Merten (born 1995), Australian high diver
- Helena Merzin-Tamm (born 1972), Estonian actress
- Helena Mesa (born 1972), American poet
- Helena van der Meulen, Dutch screenwriter, film critic and TV writer
- Helena Miagian Papilaya (born 1962), Indonesian judoka
- Helena Iren Michaelsen (born 1977), Norwegian singer
- Helena Michell (born 1963), English actress
- Helena Mikołajczyk (born 1968), Polish biathlete
- Helena Millais (1886–1970), English actress, comedienne and writer
- Helena Minić (born 1979), Croatian actress
- Helena Modjeska (1840–1909), Polish actress
- Helena Molony (1884–1967), Irish labor activist
- Helena Montalban (1926–1991), Argentine Puerto Rican theater, film and telenovela actress, producer and talk show host
- Helena Moreno (born 1977), American television reporter
- Helena Moreno (actress) (born 1989), Angolan actress
- Helena Moreno (swimmer) (born 2001), Costa Rican swimmer
- Helena Morrissey, Baroness Morrissey (born 1966), British financier and campaigner
- Helena Morsztynkiewiczowa (1894–1983), Polish architect
- Helena Cidade Moura (c. 1924–2012), Portuguese teacher, researcher, activist, politician and poet
- Helena Munktell (1852–1919), Swedish composer
- Helena Nader (born 1947), Brazilian biomedical scientist
- Helena Ndume, Namibian ophthalmologist
- Helena Nelson, British poet
- Helena Neves, Portuguese feminist and communist
- Helena Noguerra (born 1969), Belgian actress and singer
- Helena Norberg-Hodge (born 1946), Swedish linguist and writer
- Helena Nordheim (1903–1943), Dutch artistic gymnast
- Helena Normanton (1882–1957) first female barrister in the United Kingdom
- Helena Nussenzveig Lopes, Brazilian mathematician
- Helena Nyblom (1843–1926), Swedish author
- Helena Ólafsdóttir (born 1969), Icelandic footballer and former player
- Helena Olsson (born 1965), Swedish tennis player
- Helena Oma (born 1996), Spanish basketball player
- Helena Örvarsdóttir (born 1994), Icelandic handball player
- Helena Östlund (born 1971), Swedish writer
- Helena Paderewska (1856–1934), Polish social activist
- Helena Janina Pajzderska (1862–1927), Polish writer and women's rights activist
- Helena Paparizou (born 1982), Greek-Swedish singer and songwriter
- Helena Parente Cunha (c. 1929–2023), Brazilian educator and writer
- Helena Pasierbska (1921–2010), Polish writer
- Helena Pato (born 1939), Portuguese communist and union leader
- Helena Patursson (1864–1916), Faroese actress and writer
- Helena Paulo (born 1998), Angolan handball player
- Helena Percas (1921–2011), Argentine writer and scholar
- Helena Perez Garcia, Spanish illustrator
- Helena Perheentupa (1929–2019), Finnish designer
- Helena Peterson (born 1962), Swedish swimmer
- Helena Pickard (1900–1959), British actress
- Helena Pietraszkiewicz (1953–2021), Polish politician and psychologist
- Helena Pihl (born 1955), Swedish sprinter
- Helena Pilejczyk (1931–2023), Polish speed skater
- Helena Polaczkówna, Polish historian, archivist, sigillologist and authority in the field of heraldry
- Helena Ponette (born 2000), Belgian sprinter
- Helena Langhorne Powell (1862–1942), English historian and educationalist
- Helena Pueyo (born 2001), Spanish basketball player
- Helena Rakoczy (1921–2014), Polish gymnast
- Helena Ramsay (2001–2018), one of the 17 victims who was killed in the Stoneman Douglas High School shooting
- Helena Ranaldi (born 1966), Brazilian actress
- Helena Randáková, Czech ski-orienteering competitor
- Helena Ranta (born 1946), Finnish forensic dentist
- Helena Rasiowa (1917–1994), Polish mathematician
- Helena Rees-Mogg, British television personality
- Helena Resano (born 1974), Spanish journalist
- Helena Revoredo (born 1947), Spanish chairman
- Helena Riggs (1899–1968), American neuropathologist
- Helēna Ringa (born 1947), Latvian long jumper
- Helena Ripken (born 2006), German rhythmic gymnast
- Helena Rivière, Swedish politician
- Helena Rizzo, Brazilian chef and restaurateur
- Helena Rodrigues (born 1984), Portuguese canoeist
- Helena Roerich (1879–1955), Russian philosopher
- Helena Rojo (1944–2024), Mexican actress
- Helena Romanelli (born 1987), Brazilian judoka
- Helena Romer-Ochenkowska (1875–1947), Polish writer
- Helena Roque Gameiro (1895–1986), Portuguese watercolourist and painter
- Helena Rosenblatt, Swedish intellectual historian
- Helena Hillar Rosenqvist (born 1946), Swedish politician
- Helena Roseta (born 1947), Portuguese architect and politician
- Helena Rowland (born 1999), English rugby union player
- Helena Rubinstein (1870–1965), Polish industrialist
- Helena Rüegg, German bandoneonist and actress
- Helena Rutherfurd Ely (1858–1920), American amateur gardener
- Helena Růžičková (1936–2004), Czech actress
- Helena Ryšánková (born 1992), Czech handball player
- Helena Sá e Costa (1913–2006), Portuguese pianist
- Helena Salles (1919–2011), Brazilian swimmer
- Helena Salonius (1930–2012), Finnish actress and operatic soprano
- Helena Sampaio, several people
- Helena af Sandeberg (born 1971), Swedish actress
- Helena Sanders (1911–1997), Cornish humanitarian, cultural activist, politician and poet
- Helena Sångeland, Swedish diplomat
- Helena Schilizzi (1874–1959), Greek British philanthropist
- Helena Dorothea von Schönberg (1729–1799), German business person
- Helena Scott (1832–1910), Australian artist
- Helena Scott (politician) (born 1961), American politician
- Helena Scutt (born 1992), American sailor
- Helena Shearer (c. 1842–1885), Irish socialist and suffragist
- Helena Sinervo (born 1961), Finnish poet, novelist and translator
- Helena Skirmunt (1827–1874), Belarusian artist and sculptor
- Helena Skłodowska-Szalay (1866–1961), Polish educator, activist and school inspector
- Helena Slizynska (1908–1977), Polish geneticist
- Helena Olsson Smeby (born 1983), Norwegian ski jumper
- Helena Smith Dayton (1879–1960), American animator and painter
- Helena Christina van de Pavord Smits (1867–1941), Dutch botanical illustrator
- Helena Snoek (1764–1807), Dutch actress
- Helena Solberg (born 1938), Brazilian-born documentarian
- Helena Sousa (born 1994), Angolan handball player
- Helena Spajić (born 2000), Croatian footballer
- Helena Spinacuta, Swedish actress, acrobat and tightrope artist
- Helena Springs, American singer-songwriter
- Helena Squires (1878–1959), Newfoundland politician
- Helena Štáchová (1944–2017), Czech actress and puppeteer
- Helena Amélia Oehler Stemmer (1927–2016), Brazilian civil engineer and university professor
- Helena Stenbäck, Swedish model
- Helena Štěrbová (born 1988), Czech handball player
- Helena Stetkiewicz, Ukrainian politician
- Helena Stjernholm, Swedish business executive
- Helena Stollenwerk (1852–1900), German Catholic religious sister
- Helena Stone Torgerson (1878–1941), American harpist and composer
- Helena Storckenfeldt (born 1995), Swedish politician
- Helena Straková (born 1975), Czech swimmer
- Helena Sturtevant (1872–c. 1946), American artist
- Helena Suková (born 1965), Czech tennis player
- Helena Svensson (born 1979), Swedish golfer
- Helena Sverrisdóttir (born 1988), Icelandic basketball player
- Helena Swanwick (1864–1939), British suffragist, pacifist, internationalist and writer
- Helena Syrkus (1900–1982), Polish architect, urban planner and educator
- Helena Szafran (1888–1969), Polish botanist
- Helena Takalo (born 1947), Finnish cross-country skier
- Helena Tattermuschová (1933–2025), Czech operatic soprano
- Helena Thorfinn (born 1964), Swedish novelist
- Helena Alexandrovna Timofeeff-Ressovsky (1898–1973), Russian biologist
- Gelena Topilina (born 1994), Russian competitor in synchronized swimming
- Helena Třeštíková (born 1949), Czech film director
- Helena Tulve (born 1972), Estonian composer
- Helena Tuuri, Finnish diplomat
- Helena Tynell (1918–2016), Finnish glass designer
- Helena Unierzyska (1867–1932), Polish artist and sculptor
- Helena Margaretha Van Dielen (1774–1841) Dutch painter
- Helena Vašáková (born 1961), Czechoslovak sprint canoer
- Helena Vatanen (1871–1937), Finnish politician
- Helena Vaz da Silva (1939–2002), Portuguese journalist, writer and translator
- Gelena Velikanova (1922–1998), Soviet pop singer
- Helena Vierikko (born 1980), Finnish actress
- Helena Vildová (born 1972), Czech tennis player
- Helena Vilhelmsson (born 1965), Swedish politician
- Helena Maria Viramontes (born 1954), American novelist
- Helena Vondráčková (born 1947), Czech singer
- Helena Vuković (born 2000), Croatian judoka
- Helena Waldmann, German choreographer and theatre director
- Helena Waller (born 1966), Swedish freestyle skier
- Helena M. Weiss (1909–2004), American museum administrator
- Helena Wells (1761–1824), American novelist
- Helena Westermarck (1857–1938), Finnish artist and writer
- Helena Whitbread, English writer
- Helena Wiewiórska (1888–1967), Polish lawyer
- Helena Willis (born 1964), Swedish illustrator and author
- Helena Willman-Grabowska (1870–1957), Polish indologist
- Helena Wilsonová (1937–2019), Czech photographer
- Helena Winkelman (born 1974), Swiss composer
- Helena Wiśniewska (born 1999), Polish canoeist
- Helena Wolińska-Brus (1919–2008), Polish military prosecutor
- Helena Wong, several people
- Helena Wood Smith (1865–1914), American painter
- Helena Rosa Wright (1887–1982), British pioneer of birth control
- Helena Wulff (born 1954), anthropologist
- Helena Zachos (1856–1951), American college professor and elocutionist
- Helena Zarembina (1895–1960), Polish actress
- Helena Zengel (born 2008), German actress
- Helena Zeťová (1980–2024), Czech singer
- Helena Zmatlíková (1923–2005), Czech illustrator
- Helena von Zweigbergk (born 1959), Swedish journalist, author and film critic
- Princess Helena of the United Kingdom (1846–1923), daughter of Queen Victoria
- Princess Helena Victoria of Schleswig-Holstein (1870–1948)
- Heloísa Helena (politician) (born 1962), Brazilian politician
- Princess Helena of Nassau (1831–1888), Princess consort of Waldeck and Pyrmont
- Princess Helena of Waldeck and Pyrmont (1861–1922), Duchess of Albany
- Princess Helena of Waldeck and Pyrmont (1899–1948), Hereditary Grand Duchess of Oldenburg
- Lady Helena Gibbs (1899–1969), relative of the British royal family

== Fictional characters ==
- Helena (A Midsummer Night's Dream), character in the play A Midsummer Night's Dream by William Shakespeare
- Helena, character in the 1993 film Boxing Helena
- Helena Cassadine, character in the television series General Hospital
- Helena Douglas, a character in the Dead or Alive video game series
- Helena Eagan, character in the television series Severance (TV series)
- Helena (Encantadia), character in the television series Encantadia
- Helena Harper, character in the video game Resident Evil 6
- Helena Kurcewicz, character in the 1884 novel With Fire and Sword by Henryk Sienkiewicz
- Helena Peabody, character in the television series The L Word
- Helena Ravenclaw, also known as the Grey Lady, character in the Harry Potter series
- Helena Russell, character in the television series Space: 1999
- Huntress (Helena Bertinelli), DC comics superhero (debuted 1989)
- Huntress (Helena Wayne), DC comics superhero (debuted 1977)

== See also ==
- Helen (given name)
- Helena and Helen disambiguation pages
