= Lili Larys =

Polish dancer (1909–1986)

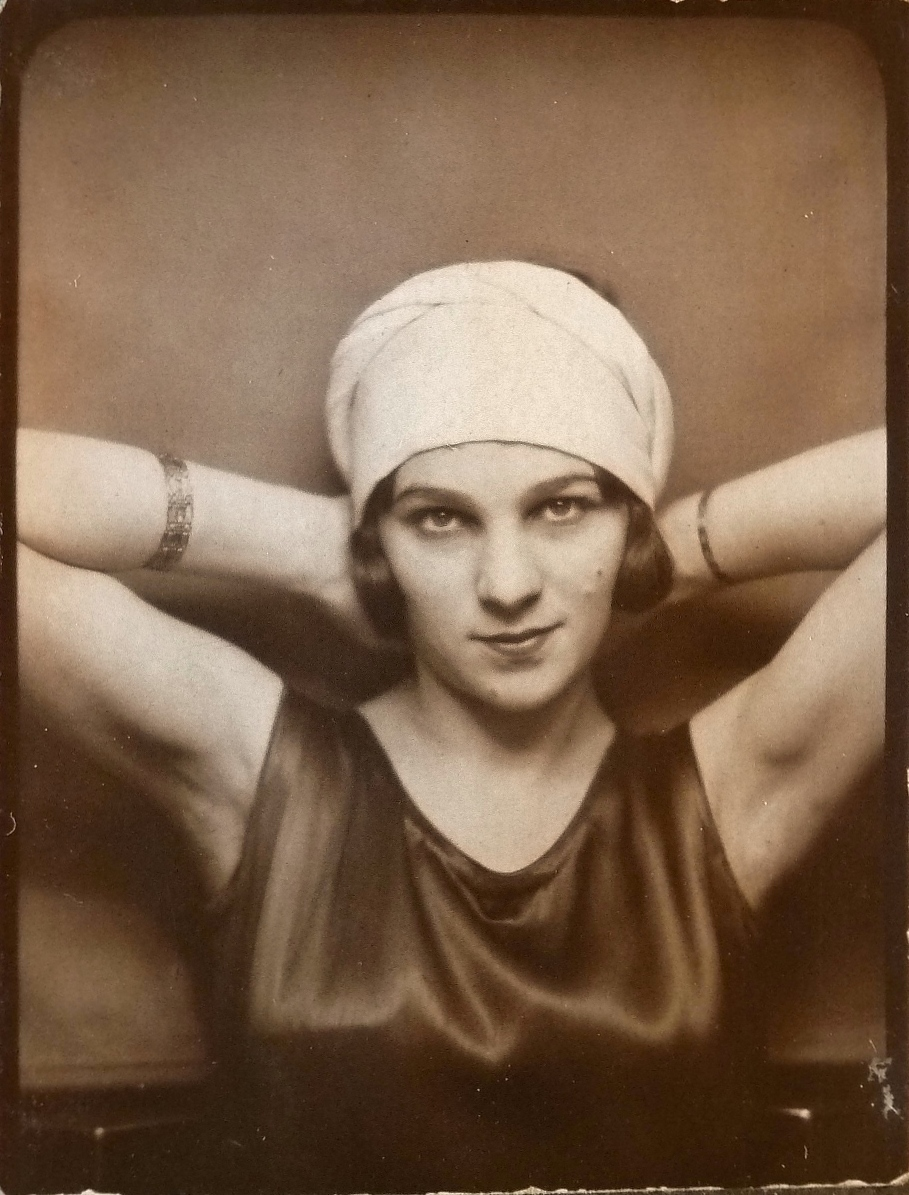
- Born: March 19, 1909; Yalta
- Died: August 24, 1986 (aged 77); Katowice
- Occupation: Dancer

Signature
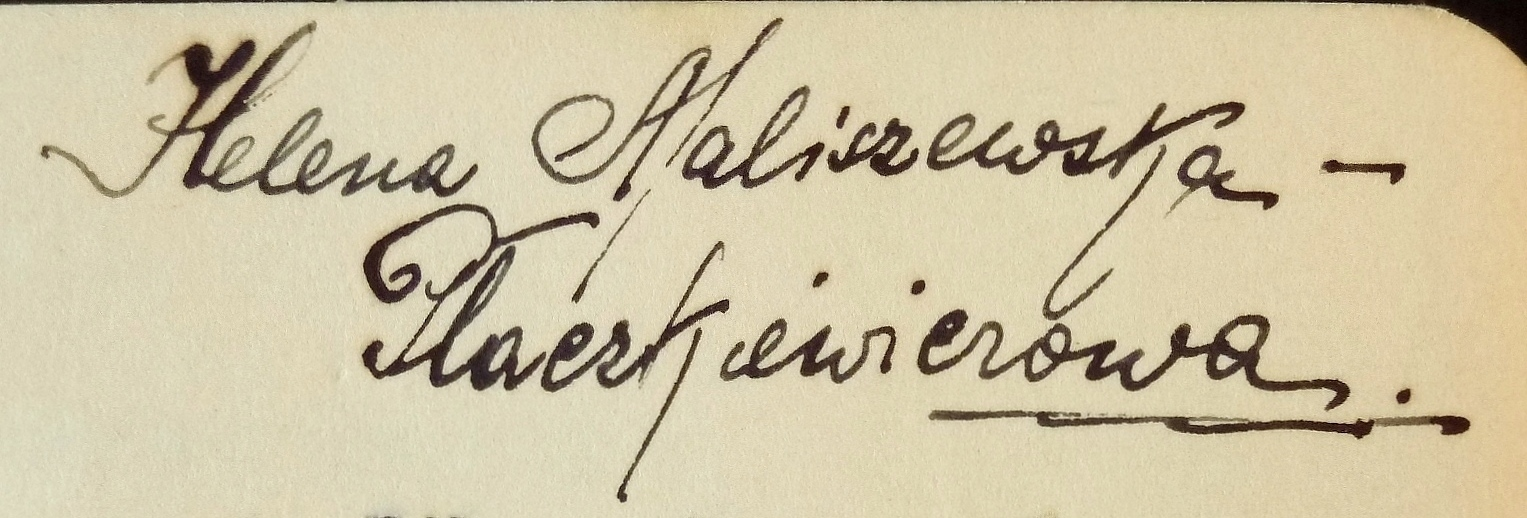

Lili Larys (Helena Maliszewska-Płaczkiewicz, primo voto Osmólska) (March 19, 1909 in Yalta, Russia – August 24, 1986 in Katowice, Poland) was a Polish dancer.

She was born to a Polish family in Yalta in the Crimea. Her parents were Andrzej Maliszewski and Teodozja Rytter. In 1905 they left Warsaw for the Crimea because of the illness of Andrzej. He was a chemist in Yalta and he had run a successful Russian-French business there. She practiced ballet while in Russia. Their house in the Crimea was visited by, among others, Ivan Mosjoukine, who taught her how to dance tango. Helena and her mother returned to Warsaw in November 1922. She continued her studies in Poland including the ballet school. Her father Andrzej had to escape from the Crimea to France because of the Bolsheviks in 1918.

Helena made her debut in 1926 and began performing solo and as a partner of, among others, the ballet master Konrad Ostrowski and Andrzej Śnieżyński in theaters, cabarets and nightclubs of Warsaw and other Polish cities. She performed in Momus (Warsaw movie theater). A Warsaw critic, Ludwik Szmaragd, wrote September 1, 1928 saw the opening of a great revue [..] In the new ensemble there is [..] an excellent dance duet of Larys-Ostrowski. She played in revue Moryc, give me a son in Momus and one of the critics (Roman Jax) wrote: From the entire program, only a ballet number Carnival in Venice, performed by a duo Larys-Ostrowski [..] won sincere appreciation of the audience.

Another review stated The highlight of the entire program was the scene In an opium den performed by virtuoso dancers Ostrowski and Larys. At that time her impresario was Blachman, who for a short time, was also the announcer of Momus. It was he who suggested the stage name Larys. Her performances Taniec Ognia to the music of Rimsky-Korsakov, The Dying Swan to the music of Saint-Saëns and Tango apaszowskie (Apache Tango) to the music of Tango Illusion by Erwin Hentschel were particularly well received. She danced to the music performed by the well known Polish orchestra leaders such as Zygmunt Karasiński, Szymon Kataszek and Arnold Lewak.

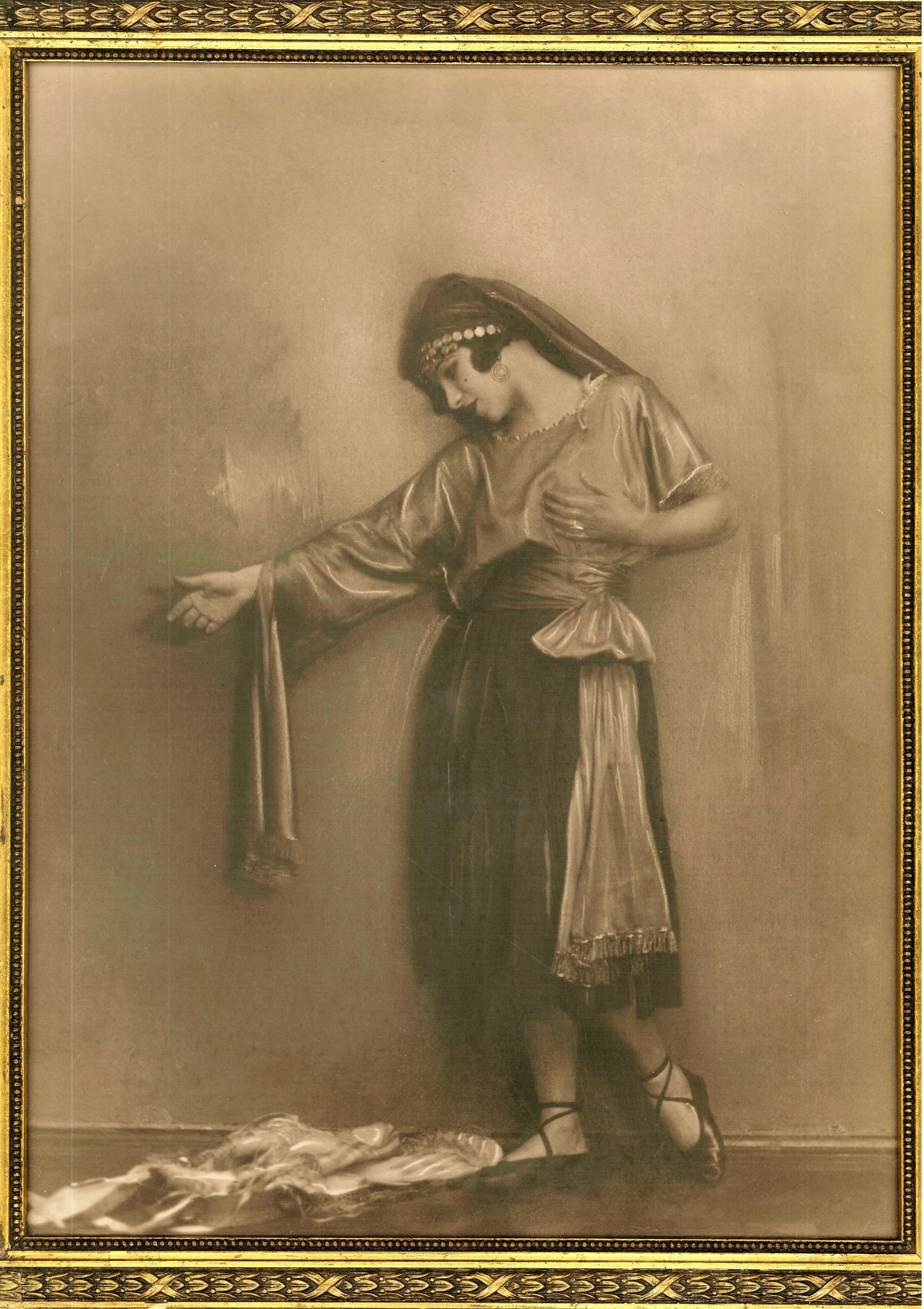
Lili Larys (Helena Maliszewska) as a Gypsy, lying on the floor is tambourine that the gypsy would reach out with her hand at the end of a performance asking for the donation. Lviv 1929.

In addition to Momus she danced in other Warsaw cabarets: Czarny Kot (Black Cat), Czerwony As (Red Ace), Nitouche. She performed in many Polish cities, including Lviv, Poznan, Lodz, Kraków, Katowice, Sopot, and in 1929, in Katowice cabaret Mascotte. In the years 1927-1933 she collaborated with Nelly Ignatowska, Ina Ney, Andrzej Śnieżyński, Irena Topolnicka, Iga Korczyńska, Konrad Ostrowski, Zdzisław Żadejko. She performed on stage until the end of 1933. In that time her longtime sweetheart was Mieczysław Stefanicki, a Polish airforce officer. In 1934 she completed a training course organized by the Institut de Beauté Clytie in Paris and later in the same year she launched her own beauty parlor called Madeleine in Poznań at the December 27 Street.

On August 30, 1939, she decided to escape from Poznań to the East of Poland. Years of the II World War and that of German occupation of Poland (1939-1945) she spent in the cities of Biała Podlaska and Lublin. In 1945, just after the war, along with her second husband she settled in Katowice. She had a daughter and two sons, the youngest is Jerzy Płaczkiewicz. She is buried in the cemetery in Katowice.
