= Antonio Bartolomeo Spinacuta =

Antonio Bartolomeo Spinacuta was a Venetian tightrope walker, acrobat, singer and dancer.

== Professional career ==
In 1786, he released the first hot air balloons in Sweden. In 1795, he was noted as active in John Bill Ricketts' circus in Philadelphia.

== Personal life ==
He was married to the Swedish actress Helena Pettersson and toured Sweden from 1784 to 1787.
