= Helena Millais =

English actress, comedienne and writer

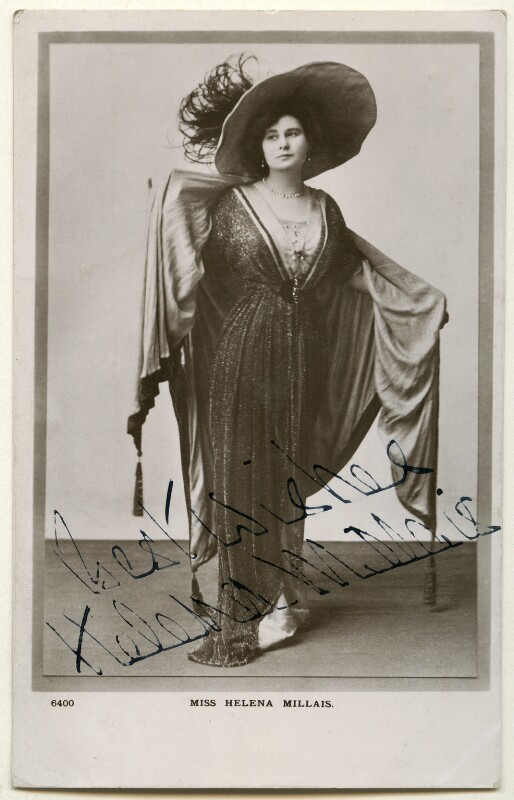
- Born: Helena Catherine Marriott; 19 April 1886; Brixton, Surrey, England
- Died: 14 November 1970 (aged 84); Folkestone, Kent
- Resting place: Highgate Cemetery
- Occupation(s): Actress, writer, comedienne

Helena Millais (19 April 1886 – 14 November 1970) was an English actress, comedienne, and writer. She was Britain's first recorded broadcast comedian, appearing on the Marconi's London Radio Station 2LO on 20 October 1922 as cockney character "Our Lizzie" two days after the BBC formed as a company and three weeks before the Corporation's first broadcast.

== Biography ==
Helena Millais was born Helena Catherine Marriott on 19 April 1886 in Brixton then in the county of Surrey. She was the only child of Richard Samuel Marriott, an engraver and book illustrator, and his wife, Helena Maude Marriott.

At the age of eighteen she joined the company of Frederick Mouillot, a prolific actor/manager, to take the part of Kathie in Old Heidelberg. Ten years later she was on the bill at the newly reopened Portsmouth Coliseum with Marie Lloyd. During the first world war Millais wrote and appeared in two short films, Meg of the Slums and The Stronger Will and in 1918 in Victory and Peace.

On 20 October 1922 she broadcast on 2LO, becoming the first comedian on what was later to become the BBC. She returned a month later to become the third entertainer to appear, after Billy Beer ('Entertainer at the Piano') and Helen Mar (an American raconteuse). This was 21 November, and the new British Broadcasting Company (later to become a Corporation) was just one week old.

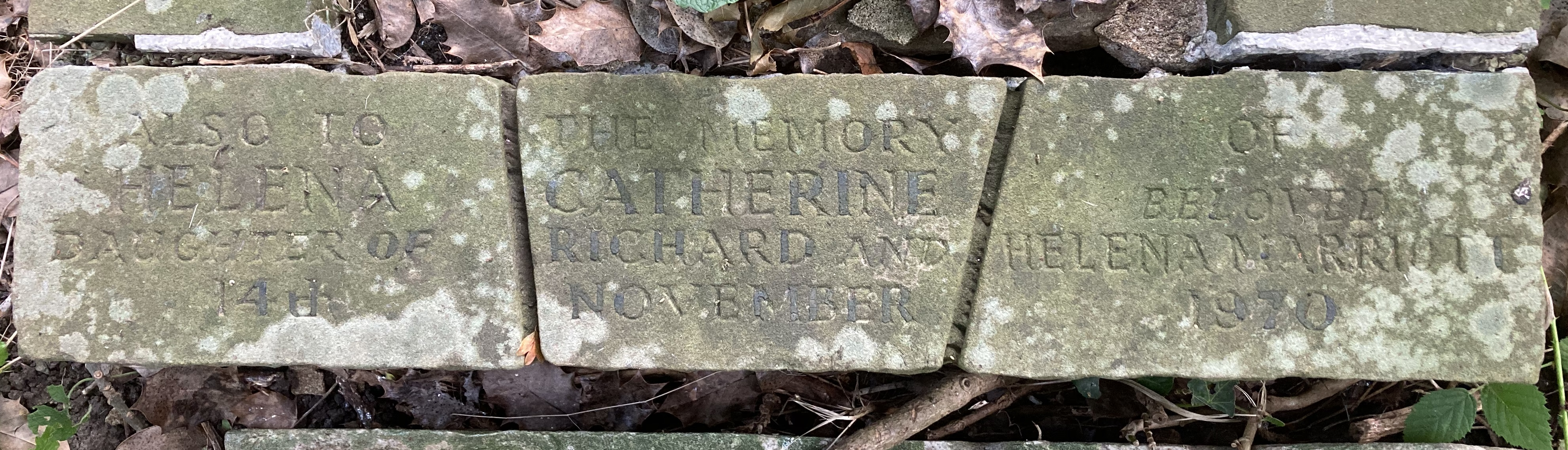
The inscription on the grave of Helena Millais in Highgate Cemetery

During the Second world war Millais toured the England with her Silver Stars Concert Party and was active in the Concert Artistes Association (CAA) which worked with ENSA. She continued performing after the war, staying where she had lived for over 40 years, in her mansion flat overlooking the Thames, next to Hammersmith Bridge in Barnes, London.

Millais died at a nursing home in Folkestone, Kent, on 14 November 1970 and was buried with her parents and grandparents in Highgate Cemetery.
