= Helena Slizynska =

Polish geneticist (b. 1908, d. 1977)

Helen Slizynska (née Gworek) (Polish spelling Helena Śliżyńska) (1908-1977) was a geneticist at the University of Edinburgh who conducted important work on the fruit fly Drosophila.

== Early life and career ==
Helena Gworek was born in 1908 in Kraków, Poland. She studied agriculture at the Jagiellonian University where Dr. Bronisław Marceli Śliżyński was a lecturer in genetics. The head of the department at that time was Professor Teodor Marchlewski, who had previously worked as a researcher at the Institute of Animal Genetics in Edinburgh. Helen graduated with a thesis on selection in Drosophila. In 1936 she married Slizynski and the couple received a grant from the Rockefeller Foundation which enabled them to go to Cold Spring Harbor for a year. Slyzinska worked together with Milislav Demerec, using the new method for locating genes from overlapping deficiencies in the salivary gland chromosomes.

== Career in Edinburgh ==
In August 1939, the Slizynskis came to Edinburgh to attend the Seventh International Congress of Genetics, which was being hosted by the Institute of Animal Genetics under Francis Albert Eley Crew. However, the outbreak of war during the Congress prevented the couple from returning to Poland and they remained permanently in Edinburgh. During the war Helen worked as a senior assistant in the Department of Biology and Genetics at the Polish School of Medicine in Edinburgh. When the war ended she joined the Institute of Animal Genetics as a researcher.

Hermann J. Muller, who was also staying at the Institute at the time, enrolled their cytological expertise in problems that occupied him, especially the behaviour of the ring chromosome at replication.

First in collaboration with her husband, then by herself, Helen analyzed the salivary glands of the progeny of irradiated and chemically treated males, developing a technique that made the results as reliable as humanly possible.

Slizynska's most notable contribution was her analysis of the difference between the spectra of chromosomal changes produced by X-rays on the one hand and chemicals on the other.

== Personal life and death ==
The couple kept in contact with the many other Poles who came to Scotland during the war. Up to her death Slizynska was involved in the social life of the Polish community.

Helen retired early to coincide with her husband's retirement, although she found it difficult to give up her scientific research. The couple had acquired a cottage in the Trossachs and it was here that Slizynska died from a heart attack after having survived several severe attacks in the hospital.
