= Helena Barbagelata =

Italian-israeli multidisciplinary artist, writer and activist

Helena Barbagelata הלנה ברבאגלטה
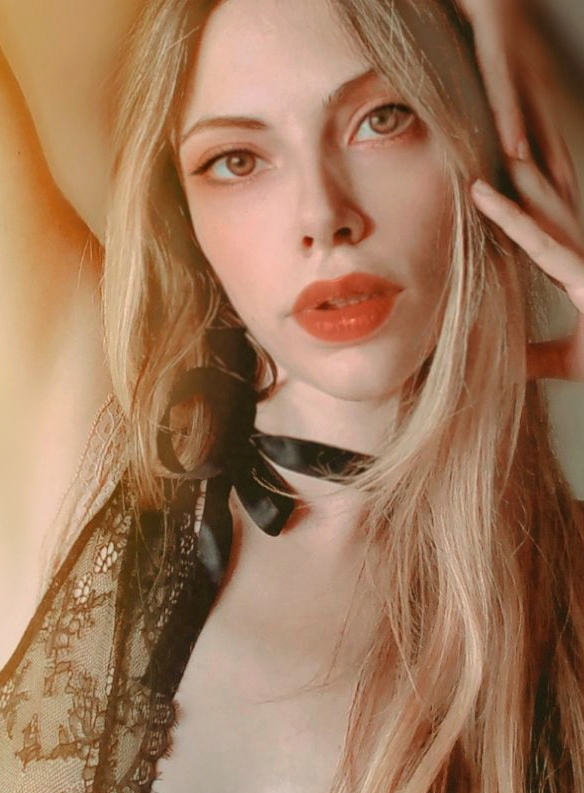
- Barbagelata in 2022
- Born: Helena Barbagelata; Genova, Italy
- Occupations: Model, Artist
- Modeling information
- Height: 5 ft 10 in (1.78 m)
- Hair color: Blonde
- Eye color: Amber
- Agency: Model Management

Helena Barbagelata (Hebrew: הלנה ברבאגלטה; born 1991) is an Italian–Israeli model, multidisciplinary artist, writer, researcher and activist.

== Life and career ==
Since 2009, she has participated in numerous solo and group exhibitions. As an eclectic artist, her activity spans the fields of Painting, Sculpture, Dance, Music, Performance, Film and Literature.

In 2024, she exhibited her film Hospice of Dry Words and her multimedia project Voices of Resilience at Versopolis, with the support of the European Commission, Creative Europe Programme, she took part in PoetryExpo 24 and her artworks were featured in Florence Contemporary Gallery's 55 Artists to Discover in 2024. She exhibited her series Fessures in Palermo, Italy, in the group exhibition "Rooting our Cities" promoted by Artists for Plants in collaboration with the Botanical Garden of the University of Palermo.

In 2023, she exhibited her mixed-media series Untamed Skin, in Laguna Beach, California at Las Laguna Art Gallery. Her acrylic and gouache series The Long Road Home was on view at the University of Concordia, Montreal, as part of the multimedia exposition Arts & Human Rights: Conversing Multiplicities organized and developed by the Human Rights Research and Education Centre (HRREC) from the University of Ottawa, Canada. She was awarded Best in Show for her artwork Darar II, in the group exhibition Essence in Hong Kong, at Gallery Omata. She took part in the international exhibition "C1en por Cientos", for LaFabrica Terminal, in Bogotá, Colombia. She participated in the Art Fair ESCAPE In/Out, for Follow.Art, in Milan, Italy, with her series Papercut Light. She was awarded a Silver Award for her artwork The Long Road Home II, in FACES 2023, International Juried Painting Exhibition, at Camelback Gallery, and awarded an Artistic Excellence Award for her artwork The Nameless Silence, by Circle Foundation for the Arts. In 2022, she exhibited AHAVA in Rome, Italy, at Millepiani in the group exhibition "POLITICAL STATEMENT". The artist also presented her series The Movable Limit in Florence, Italy, for Florence Contemporary Art Gallery and she participated in the video-art installation Artists at Work in Antwerp, Belgium, at NIIC for Antwerp Art Weekend. Her work Magma was exhibited in Buenos Aires, Argentina, at Galería Gisel Durán and awarded a jury's mention. She participated in the group show 1000 Women in Art, in Nuevo León, Mexico, for Museo del Antiguo Palacio de García, in homage of International Women's Day. She was invited to participate in the XIII Florence Biennale Eternal Feminine/Eternal Change, Concepts of Femininity in Contemporary Art and Design, under the patronage of the European Parliament, the Italian Commission of UNESCO, the Italian Ministry of Culture and Tourism, the Region of Tuscany, and the Municipality of Florence.

In 2021, she took part in "Project Lazaretta: Digital Stories from the Old and New World", Eyes Walk Festival, CulturePolis, supported by the Ministry of Culture and Sport of the Greek Government, with her short-film The Key to the Abysm. That same year, she participated in Israel Art Market's Passover Exhibition, and exhibited her series INSULA at Kulturschöpfer, Green Hill Gallery in Berlin, Germany. She had her work on display at Gorki Park, Muzeon Art Center in Moscow, Russia, as one of the finalists of "TAKEDA ART/HELP. Expanding the Limits of the Visible" international art prize, awarded by Saint Petersburg Repin Academy of Arts and the HSE Art and Design School.

Her artworks have been featured in several international art magazines and catalogs, such as Artist Talk Magazine, Art Magazineium, Modern Renaissance, GRAES, Antithesis, Tint Journal, Bruxelles Art Vue, among others.

She's a member of the America-Israel Cultural Foundation.

== Bibliography ==
=== Poetry and Illustrations ===
- Black Ink. Sod Press (2023) ISBN 979-8863974095
- Enlisted Youth. Sod Press (2023) ISBN 979-8863167244
- Terra Sigillata. Empoli (2023) ISBN 979-8398218282
- Steps in Time. Sod Press (2022) ISBN 979-8862794045
- Ahava. Sod Press (2020) ISBN 979-8398944303
- Yareach Zamir. Sod Press (2021) ISBN 979-8862582437

=== Illustrated Short Story collections ===
- Heartstrings. Sod Press (2024) ISBN 979-8884843011
- Le Navi Insognate. Rizzoli (2017) ISBN 979-8492302900
- El Naranjo Embrujado. Euterpe (2019) ISBN 979-8521106196

== Published works ==
=== Author and Illustrator ===
- Shayit, 2023, published by Modern Renaissance – Arts Magazine, Culturally Arts Collective.
- Fire and Brimstone, 2023, published by Insights of an Eco Artist.
- Color Sur and Rimon, 2022, published by Art Magazineium.
- Gymnographia, 2022, published by Horizonte Gris – Revista Literaria.
- Three Poems and Three Illustrations from Fasti Diurni, 2021, published by Magma Magazine Italia, with commentary by Damiana De Gennaro.
- Amarelinha, 2021, published by Laranja Original – Literature and Art Review, Autumn/winter 2021 issue, São Paulo, Brazil.
- El Naranjo Embrujado, Three Poems and Three Illustrations, 2021, published by Ruído Manifesto – Literatura, Crítica e Audiovisual.
- Tsippor, 2021, published by Pigeon Review – an Art and Literary Journal, August/Summer issue.
- Chofesh, 2021, published by Revista Rito, June issue.
- Firedances, 2021, published by Bookends Review, September issue.
- Alegrías, 2020, published by GRAES Magazine – For Multilingual Minds, issue 2, Dialect.
- Kedoshim, 2020, magazine cover, published by Kind Writers – Literary Magazine, San Diego, California.
- River-Daughters, 2020, published by The New Southern Fugitives – Literary Zine, Vol. 3, Issue 25, SFK PRESS, Louisiana, USA.
- Exodus, 2020, published by Writing for Peace – A Literary Journal of the Arts, Resistance Issue. New York, USA.
- Dryad, 2019, published by Formidable Woman Sanctuary Issue No. 2, Vol. 1.

=== Illustrated by Barbagelata ===
- Ficção Talvez Ensaio, illustrated by Shevirat, 2023, published in Revista Caliban, written by Demétrio Panarotto.
- Omissions, 2022, published in The Brooklyn Review, written by Lauren McGovern.
- Ghosts of Shivalik, 2021, published by AbstractMagazine:Contemporary Expressions, written by Kulbir Saran.
- Please don't let me be misunderstood, 2020, SINK Hollow – Issue No. 9, Utah State University, written by Rebecca Bihn-Wallace.
- The Music Woman Plays Infinite Strings, 2020, published by TINT Journal – Issue No. 2, written by Rhea Malik.
- Loving Myself Sick, 2020, published by ANTITHESIS Journal – Volume 30, Mental. University of Melbourne, Australia, written by Maja Amanita.
- Entre as coisas estrangeiras, 2020, InComunidade – Art and Culture. #Issue 99, written by Marcos Pamplona.
- Subversa, Vol.5, nº10, magazine cover and internal illustrations, 2016, published by Subversa.
- Subversa, Vol.5, nº4, magazine cover and internal illustrations, 2016, published by Subversa.

=== Including work by Barbagelata ===
- Artist Talk Magazine, 2023, Issue 23, published by Milne Publishing.
- Art Magazineium, Issue 22, 2023 published by Art Magazineium.
- Goddess Arts Magazine, 2023, Issue 8, published by Lena Snow.
- 1000 Mujeres en el Arte, 2022, curated by Cintia Arellano (org), published by Museo Nacional del Antiguo Palacio de García, with the support of the Municipality of Nuevo León, México.
- Limitless Nature, 2022, published by Bruxelles Art Vue.
- The Social Art Award 2021-New Greening, Edition No. 3, 2021, published by Institute for Art and Innovation e.V. ISBN 978-3-9819114-3-5.
- Child refugees-Vulnerabilities and Strength through Art, 2022, published by Artvocate Journal.
- The Working Artist, 2021, Vol.1, published by the Working Artist.
- ChromART, 2021, published by Chroma Art Gallery, editor Georgina Magklara.
