= Helena Christina van de Pavord Smits =

Dutch Artist

- Born: 21 October 1867; Leiden, Netherlands
- Died: 27 January 1941 (aged 73); Leiden, Netherlands
- Known for: Illustration, Painting

Helena Christina van de Pavord Smits (1867-1941) was a Dutch botanical illustrator.

== Biography ==
Pavord Smits was born on 21 October 1867 in Leiden, Netherlands. She attended the Academie van Beeldende Kunsten, Den Haag (Royal Academy of Art, The Hague. She studied with Jan Philip Koelman, Willem van der Nat, Timotheus Wilhelmus Ouwerkerk, and Mathilde Frederika Wilhelmina Tonnet. She worked as an illustrator for the journal "Flora Batava" and the Rijksherbarium te Leiden (National Herbarium of the Netherlands).

Pavord Smits died on 27 January 1941, in Leiden.

== Gallery ==
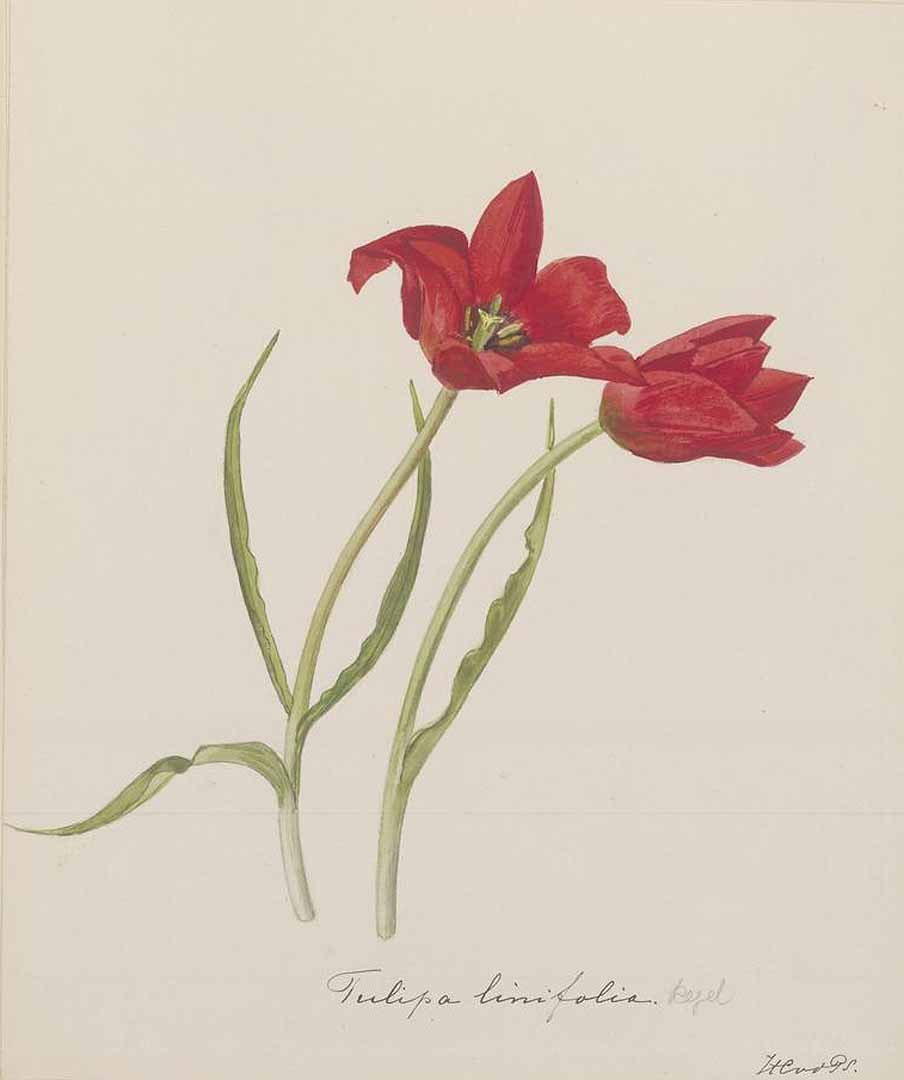
Tulipa linifolia Regel

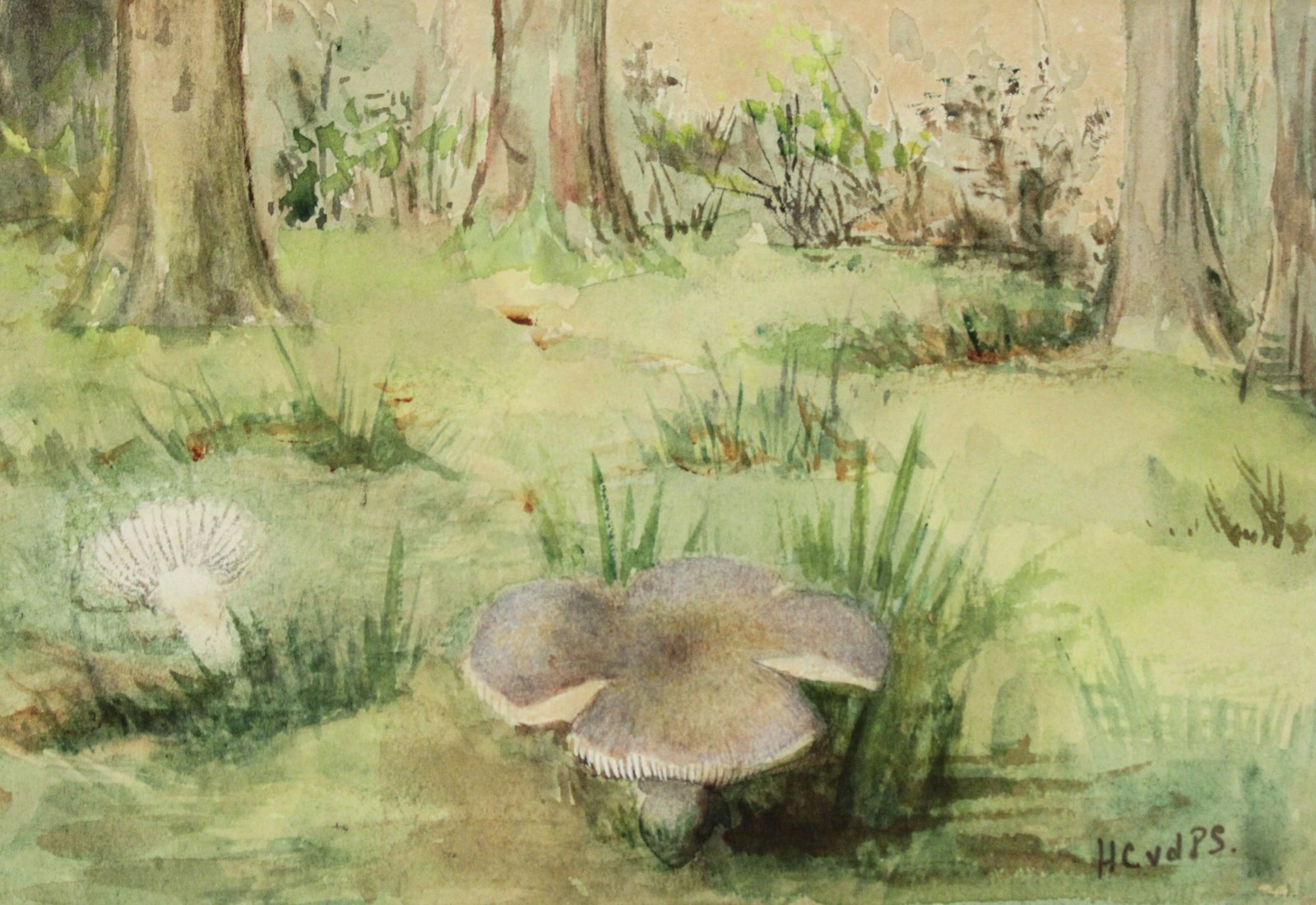
Mushrooms in the Woods
