= Helena Kurnatowska =

Polish politician (1929–2005)

Member of Sejm
- In office 21 March 1976 – 31 August 1985

Personal details
- Born: Helena Floriana Kurnatowska; 17 February 1929 Lille, France
- Died: 14 April 2005 (aged 76)
- Party: Polish United Workers' Party
- Education: Wroclaw University of Technology
- Profession: Chemical engineer

Helena Floriana Kurnatowska (17 February 1929 – 14 April 2005) was a Polish politician who served as a Member of Sejm from 1976 to 1985.

== Early life and education ==
Helena Floriana Kurnatowska was born on 17 February 1929 in Lille, France. She studied chemical engineering at the Wroclaw University of Technology.

== Political career ==
From 1976, she was a Regional Councillor on the National Council in Katowice and was a Director in the Office of Design and Paint Plastics Industry "PROERG" in Gliwice. In 1976 she was elected as a Member of the Sejm. She stood as a candidate in Gliwice district on behalf of the Polish United Workers' Party. In 1980, she was re-elected. She served on the Committee on Mines, Energy and Chemistry; the Committee of Labour and Social Affairs; and the Committee on Industry.

== Death ==
Kurnatowska died on 14 April 2005, at the age of 75.

== Awards and honors ==
- Order of Polonia Restituta
- Cross of Merit
- Medal of Merit for National Defence
