= Helena Margaretha Van Dielen =

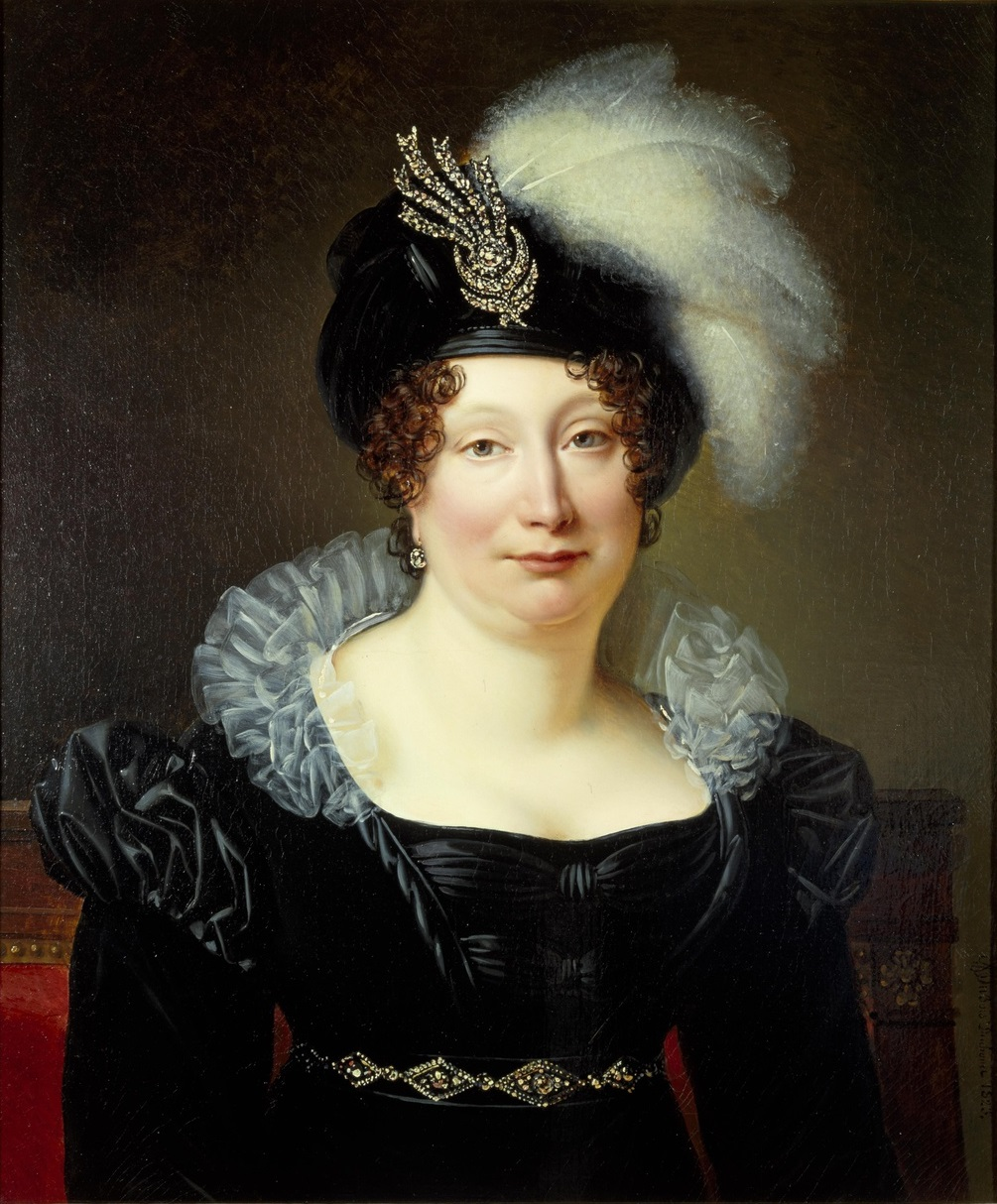
Portrait of Helena Margaretha van Dielen (1823) by Alexandre Jean Dubois Drahonne

Helena Margaretha Van Dielen, also known as Helena Margaretha Van Romondt, (1774–1841) was a Dutch artist, known for painting, drawing and watercolor. Her artwork subjects included flowers, and still life.

She was born in Utrecht (in what is now Netherlands) on 13 March 1774, to Anna Apollonia Decker and Willem Jan Baptist van Dielen. She was the younger sister of painter Adriaan Jacob Willem van Dielen (1772–1812).

Van Dielen married on 29 May 1791 to Otto van Romondt of Dutch nobility and of the municipal council and provincial executive of Utrecht. Van Dielen died in Utrecht on 23 January 1841.
