= Helena Wiewiórska =

Polish lawyer

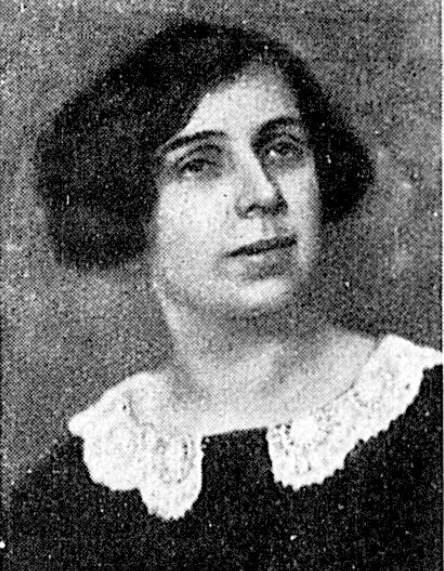
Helena Wiewiórska

Helena Wiewiórska (born 2 September 1888 in Zgierz; died 17 May 1967 in Warsaw) was the first female lawyer in Poland. In 1925, Helena Wiewiórska was the first woman to be entered on the list of the Polish Bar, thus undertaking independent work in the field of civil law. During the occupation, she helped people at risk by giving them hospitality in their home and in July 1940, she was arrested by the Gestapo, but as a person with diphtheria, she was released from custody.
