= Helena Krasowska =

Polish slavist

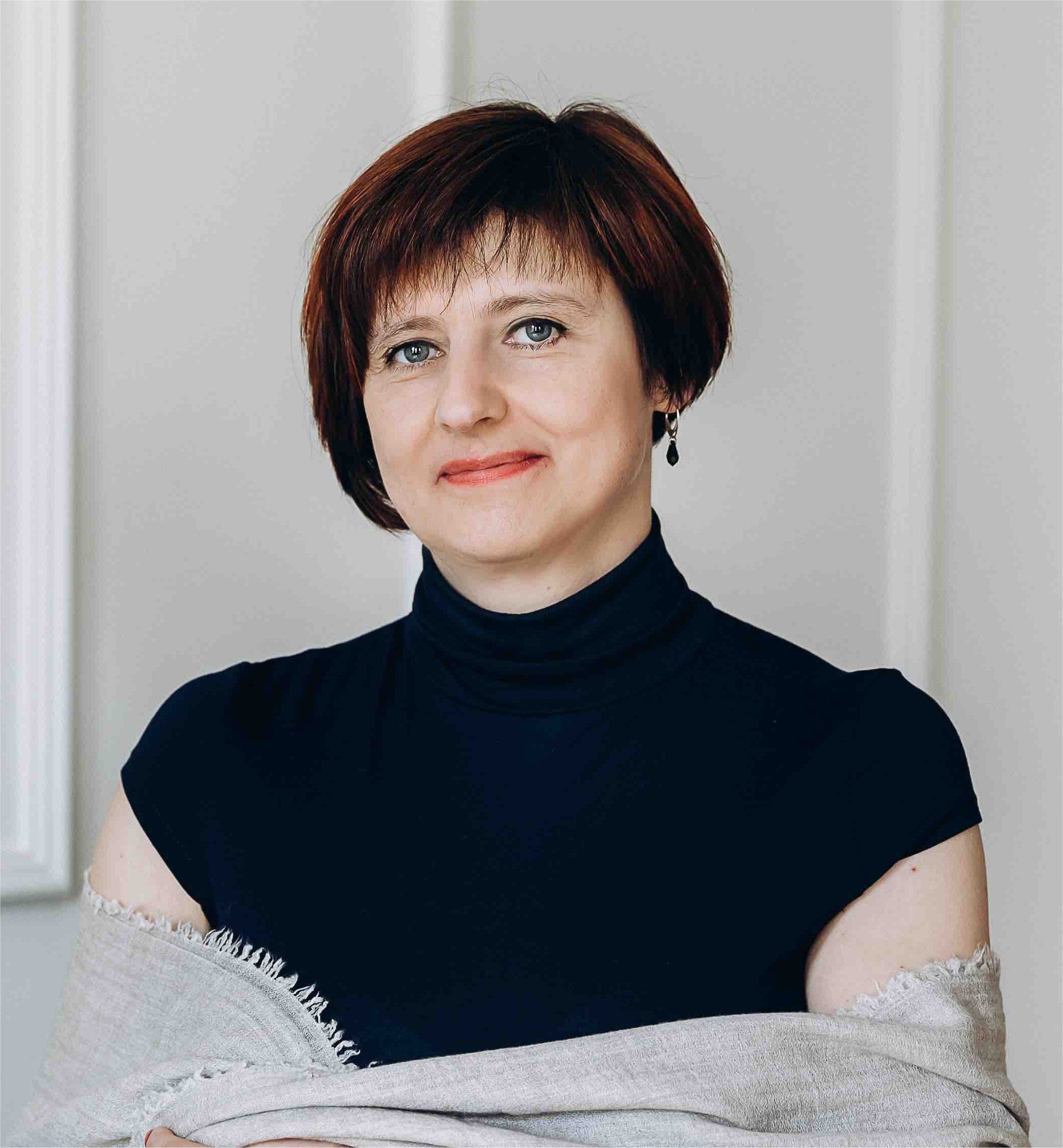
- Born: 1973 (age 52–53); Panka, Ukraine
- Education: Pedagogical University in Rzeszow
- Occupations: Academic, linguist
- Employer: Institute of Slavic Studies of the Polish Academy of Sciences
- Title: professor

Helena Krasowska (born 1973) is a Polish linguist and professor at the Institute of Slavic Studies of the Polish Academy of Sciences in Warsaw and visiting professor at the Center for Eastern Europe at the University of Warsaw. She specializes in issues related to dialectology, sociolinguistics, ethnology, and folklore. Her has authored 7 original monographs and co-authored 8 others.

== Career ==
Since 2004, she has been employed at the Institute of Slavic Studies of the Polish Academy of Sciences (IS PAN). She specializes in issues related to dialectology, sociolinguistics, ethnology, and folklore. Her scientific interests focus on the issues of national and linguistic minorities, linguistic biographies, cultural borderlands, linguistic contacts, multilingualism, multi-social and individual memory.

She is particularly interested in the region Bukovina. She conducts field research in Ukraine, Moldova, Romania and Georgia.

Her achievements include 7 original monographs and 8 co-authored monographs. Krasowska also translates poetry from Polish to Ukrainian, writes essays and poems.

== Publications ==
- The Polish Minority in South-Eastern Ukraine, Warszawa: Instytut Slawistyki PAN, 2017, ISBN 978-83-64031-65-6
- Соціолінгвістичний компендіум (A sociolinguistic compendium), Kijów: Polska Akademia Nauk 2020. ISBN 9786177832668 (współautorzy: Олексій Сухомлинов, Петро Сигеда)
- Języki mniejszości. Status – prestiż – dwujęzyczność – wielojęzyczność (Minority languages. Status - prestige - bilingualism - multilingualism), Warszawa: Studium Europy Wschodniej UW, 2020 ISBN 9788361325802
- Świadectwo zanikającego dziedzictwa. Mowa polska na Bukowinie: Rumunia – Ukraina (A testimony of vanishing heritage. Polish speech in Bukovina: Romania - Ukraine). Warszawa: Instytut Slawistyki PAN, 2018. ISBN 978-83-64031-84-7 ISBN 978-83-64031-85-4 (e-book) (Helena Krasowska, Magdalena Pokrzyńska, Lech Aleksy Suchomłynow)
- Mniejszość polska na południowo-wschodniej Ukrainie (The Polish Minority in South-Eastern Ukraine), Warszawa: Slawistyczny Ośrodek Wydawniczy, 2012, ISBN 978-83-89191-08-3
- Górale polscy na Bukowinie Karpackiej. Studium socjolingwistyczne i leksykalne (Polish highlanders in Carpathian Bukovina. A sociolinguistic and lexical study), Warszawa: Slawistyczny Ośrodek Wydawniczy, 2006

== Awards ==
- Meritorious for Polish Culture (2011)
- Silver Cross of Merit (2018)
- Bronze Medal for Merit to Culture – Gloria Artis (2019)
- Bene Merito honorary badge (2021)
