= Helena Markson =

British printmaker

- Born: 1934
- Died: 2012 (aged 77–78)
- Known for: Printmaking

Helena Markson (1934–2012) was a British artist known for her work as a printmaker.

Markson was born in London in 1934. From 1952 to 1956 she attended the Central School of Arts and Crafts in London. In 1970 Markson moved to Israel. In Israel she taught art at the Bezalel Academy of Arts and Design, the Avni Institute of Art and Design and at the University of Haifa, at which she founded the university's printmaking studios. Her primary practice was etching and aquatint. During the 1950-1960s she exhibited her work in numerous exhibitions in London.

She died in Cambridge in 2012.

== Collections ==
Examples of Markson's work are in the permanent collections of the Tate Museum, the Walker Art Gallery in Liverpool, and the Ben Uri Gallery & Museum.
