= Helena Chagas =

Brazilian journalist

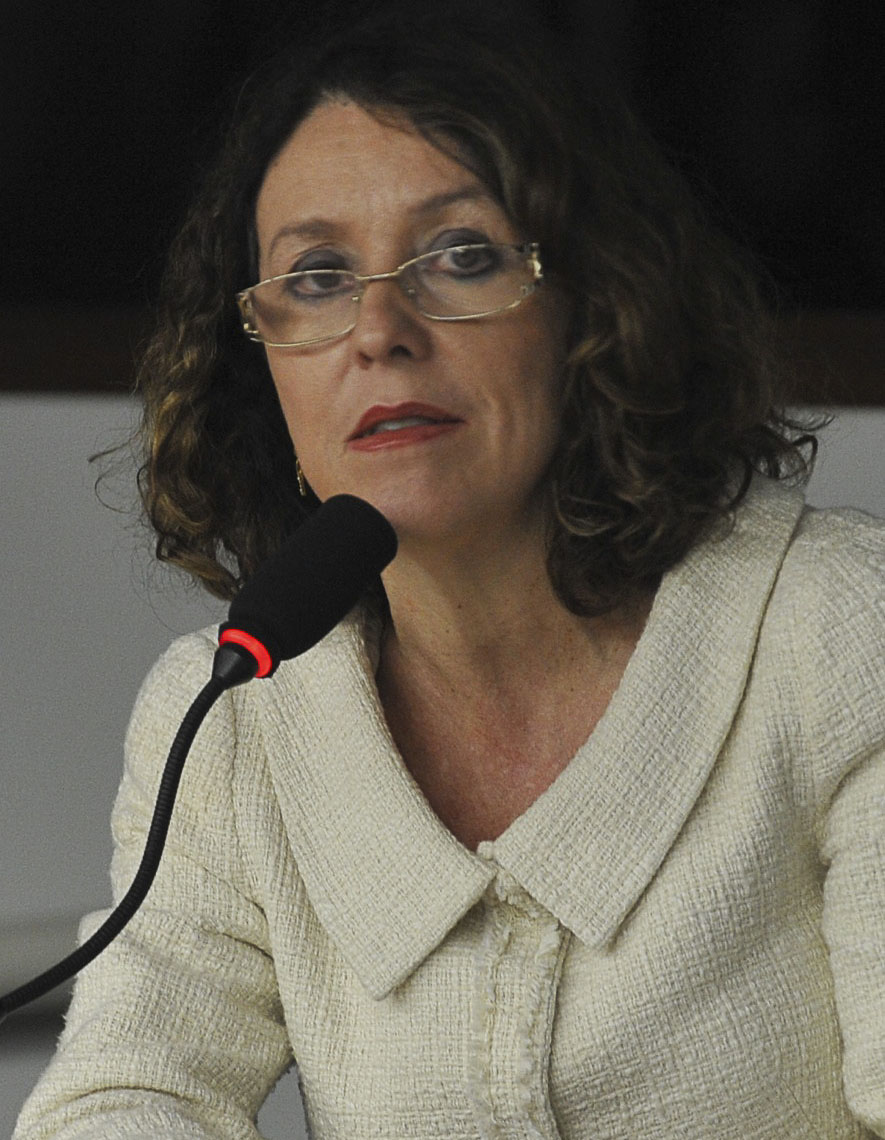

Secretary of Social Communication for the Presidency of Brazil
- In office 1 January 2011 – 3 February 2014
- President: Dilma Rousseff
- Preceded by: Franklin Martins
- Succeeded by: Thomas Traumann

Personal details
- Born: Helena Maria de Freitas Chagas; 13 October 1961 (age 64) Rio de Janeiro, Brazil
- Education: University of Brasília
- Occupation: Journalist

Helena Maria de Freitas Chagas (born 13 October 1961) is a Brazilian journalist. The daughter of political journalist Carlos Chagas, she served as Secretary of Social Communication for the Presidency of Brazil from 2011 to 2014. Today, she is a communication consultant and sporadically writes for the Jornal O Globo's Blog do Noblat.

== Journalism career ==
Chagas graduated from the University of Brasília and went through major media outlets, having covered events such as the inauguration of the New Republic and the Brazilian Constituent Assembly. Starting at the newspaper O Globo, in 1982, she moved to the Brazilian Senate as a public servant, and she worked there as a reporter and producer of the programs of the legislative house. Returning to O Globo in 1995, she acted as coordinator of the policy area, in addition to being editor-in-chief and director of the Brasília branch.

From then on, Chagas kept columns in the newspaper O Globo and in the newspaper Diário de S. Paulo, in addition to a political analysis blog on the portal globo.com. In 2006, she took over as director of journalism at the Brasília branch of SBT. She was also coordinator of TV Brasil, Agência Brasil and the radio system of the Brazil Communication Company, always emphasizing matters related to citizenship.

== Involvement in politics ==
In April 2010, Chagas became the press coordinator for Dilma Rousseff's campaign. On 9 December 2010, she was named Secretary of Social Communication for the Presidency of Brazil. She left office on 3 February 2014, having been replaced by Thomas Traumann.
