= Helena Thorfinn =

Swedish novelist

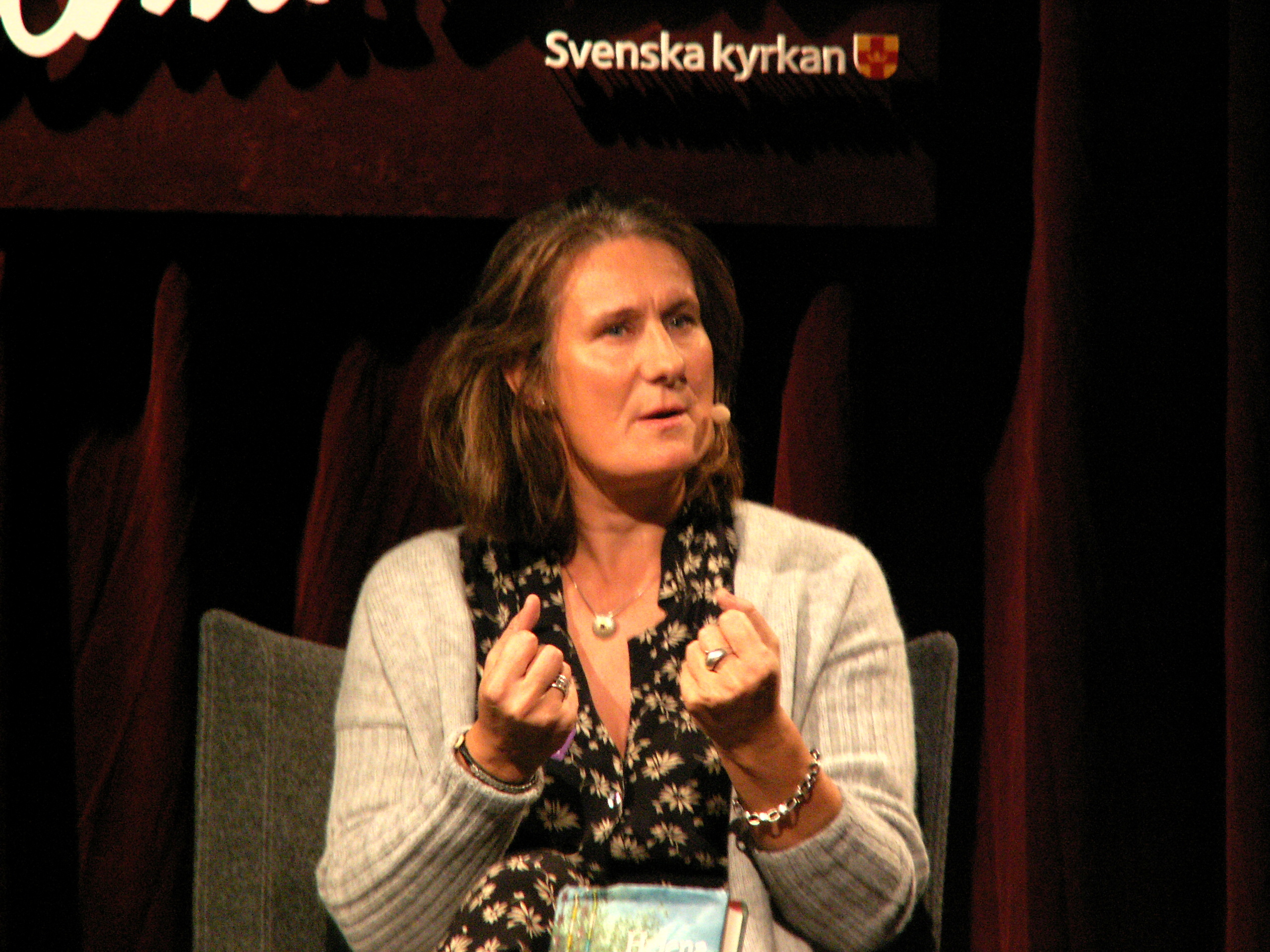
- Helena Thorfinn in 2017
- Born: 27 December 1964 (age 61); Lund, Sweden
- Occupation: Novelist
- Writing career
- Language: Swedish
- Notable works: Innan floden tar oss Den som går på tigerstigar

Helena Thorfinn (born 1964) is a Swedish fiction writer and journalist, born in Lund in southern Sweden. Her books are noted for their interest in international development, poverty, human rights and "ex-pat experiences".

Before the publication of her first book, Innan Floden Tar Oss (Before the River Takes Us) in 2012, Thorfinn worked in international development. This followed a career as a journalist in national print and broadcast media in Sweden. She has also produced documentaries for national TV. Innan Floden has been translated into Polish, Norwegian, Icelandic and English.

== Biography ==
Thorfinn started work as a journalist in her home town Lund before moving to Stockholm to join the national daily Svenska dagbladet as one of its youngest reporters. She was later headhunted to work on the flagship investigative reporting programme, Kalla Fakta, on the newly started television channel, TV4. In 1992, Thorfinn moved to London, UK, reporting for, among others, Swedish Broadcasting. On return to Sweden, she continued to work as a journalist before completing a master's degree in international development at Uppsala University.

In 2000, Thorfinn started to work for the Swedish International Development Cooperation Agency as a gender advisor. Between 2005 and 2008, she was based at the Swedish Embassy in Dhaka, Bangladesh, as an analyst/first secretary, where she initiated a qualitative results framework called "Reality Checks". It won acclaim among development partners.

The time in Bangladesh inspired her to write her first novel, which is set in the fascinating but peculiar world of international ex-patriates in a country struggling to deal with extreme poverty and the changes caused by rapid industrialization, urbanization and climate change. The book was written and published during her time at Lund University's Creative Writing Programme, LUFS, 2010–2012. It was widely discussed when published and Thorfinn appeared on numerous TV shows and conferences to discuss development aid. She was voted one of Sweden's most influential voices in human rights and development in 2013.

In 2014, Thorfinn moved to Burma/Myanmar where she worked for various development partners, amongst them the Swedish Embassy, UNICEF and Save the Children. At the same time, she completed and published her second novel, Den som går på tigerstigar, which also became a bestseller in Sweden. She also prepared the establishment of an NGO focused on "girl issues" called MeSheWe. MeSheWe is now formally established and working to support the rights of girls in Myanmar and Bangladesh. While living in Myanmar/Burma Thorfinn visited several Asian literature festivals where she participated in panels and seminars.

Since 2018, Thorfinn has lived in Washington DC and is said to be writing a book about Myanmar/Burma, as well as supporting the development of MeSheWe.

== Bibliography ==
=== Novels ===
- 2012 – Innan floden tar oss (Norstedts förlag)
- 2017 – Den som går på tigerstigar (Norstedts förlag)
