= Helena Szafran =

Polish botanist (1888–1969)

Helena Szafran (1888-1969) was a Polish botanist, educator and conservationist known for her botanical research on the flora of Greater Poland.
