= Helena Rosenblatt =

Swedish intellectual historian

Helena Rosenblatt is a Swedish historian specializing in intellectual history. She is currently a Distinguished Professor of History at the Graduate Center, CUNY, and holds similar chairs in French, Political Science, and Biography and Memoir. She is also a member of the Board of Editors of the Tocqueville Review and Global Intellectual History Review.

Her most prominent work, The Lost History of Liberalism: From Ancient Rome to the Twenty-First Century, was named one of Foreign Affairs' Best Books in 2018 and its Spanish translation was listed among the Ten Best History Books of the year by El Confidencial. The book has been translated into nine languages and has been the object of multiple media reviews.

She was awarded with a Guggenheim Fellowship in 2019, and has held fellowships from the National Humanities Center in North Carolina and the Hunter College with the Presidential Award for Excellence in Scholarship. In 2010, she received the Prix Benjamin Constant, awarded by the Association Benjamin Constant in Lausanne, for her work on Constant's political philosophy.

== Publications ==
=== Books ===
- The Lost History of Liberalism: From Ancient Rome to the Twenty-First Century (2018). Princeton University Press. ISBN 9780691170701
- Liberal Values: Benjamin Constant and the Politics of Religion (2008). Cambridge University Press. ISBN 9780521898256
- Rousseau and Geneva: From the First Discourse to the Social Contract, 1749-1762 (1997). Cambridge University Press. ISBN 9780521898256

=== Edited volumes ===
- Thinking with Rousseau, from Machiavelli to Schmitt (2017). Edited with Paul Schweigert. Cambridge University Press. ISBN 1107513596
- French Liberalism from Montesquieu to the Present Day (2012). Edited with Raf Geenens. Cambridge University Press. ISBN 110751553X
- The Cambridge Companion to Constant (2009). Cambridge University Press. ISBN 0521856469
