= Helena Rüegg =

German bandoneonist and author (born 1959)

- Born: 1959 (age 65–66); Zürich, Switzerland
- Education: Codarts
- Occupations: Actress; Bandoneonist; Author

Helena Rüegg (born 1959 in Zürich) is a German bandoneon player, actress and writer. First working as a stage actress, she focused on the bandoneon form age 32, playing in several orchestras and ensembles internationally. She authored radio features, a novel for young people and, with Arne Birkenstock, a collection about history and stories of the tango.

== Life and career ==
Rüegg was born in Zürich. the family moved to Germany when she was age three. She trained to be an actor at the Neue Münchner Schauspielschule, and was engaged at the Residenztheater in Munich, the Theater Basel and the Schauspielhaus Bochum, playing roles such as Luise in Schiller's Kabale und Liebe and Lena in Büchner's Leonce und Lena). At age 32, she decided to try something new, moved to Buenos Aires and met the bandoneon. She studied the instrument with Rodolfo Mederos. From 1993, she studied at the department of tango at the Rotterdam conservatoire, graduating with a diploma in 1998.

=== Musician ===
Rüegg was a member of Juan José Mosalini's Gran Orquesta de Tango from 1998 to 2001. From 1995, she has played in tango ensembles, such as the Quinteto Bailongo, touring Argentina and Europe with Mederos, in the Luis Borda Cuarteto, and in a Paris ensemble, Gabriel Vallejo Cuarteto. She formed a duo with the Argentinian guitarist Quique Sinesi, Siru Tangjazzo, for programs combining classical tango, nuevo tango, new compositions and improvisations. They collaborated with the French tubist Michel Godard, recording a CD, Días de felicidad.

In 1997, she performed with voice and instrument in the world premiere of Eckard Koltermann's chamber opera Der ungeheure Raum after texts by E. E. Cummings at the Prinzregenttheater in Bochum. Form 2001, she has also composed and played music for literary readings, including Peter Lieck and Bernt Hahn (Proust's A la recherche du temps perdu), Monica Bleibtreu (Asche, Asche, poems by Alejandra Pizarnik) and Rufus Beck (M. A. Numminen's Tango, meine Leidenschaft).

In 2006, she performed as a soloist at the BBC Proms, in a concert with tenor Juan Diego Flórez and the BBC Symphony Orchestra at the Royal Albert Hall in London. She has toured with a program of narrating the history of tango music. In 2007, she toured with a recital of Jiddish songs such as "Jefet, erzähl!" and "Von Luftmenschen und Goldenen Pfauen". In 2008, she performed and recorded Palmeri's Luis Bacalov's Misa Tango with the WDR Rundfunkorchester und the WDR Rundfunkchor in Cologne.

=== Author ===
In 1990, Rüegg published a historic novel for young readers, Liese Litt, with Ravensburger Buchverlag. She worked as author and producer of radio programs for Westdeutscher Rundfunk (WDR). She co-authored a book with Arne Birkenstock, Tango, Geschichte und Geschichten (Tango, history and stories), first published in 1999 and several further editions.

== Recordings ==
- Collage 11, 1991
- On Children Street, 1996
- Tiempos Viejos, 1997
- Adiós Buenos Aires, 1999
- Ciudad Triste, 2001
- Café 1930, S2002
- Un Nuevo Comienzo, 2007
- Días de felicidad, 2012

== Books ==
- Liese Litt, novel, 1990
- Arne Birkenstock, Helena Rüegg: Tango, Geschichte und Geschichten, DTV 1999
