= Helena Basilova =

Dutch pianist

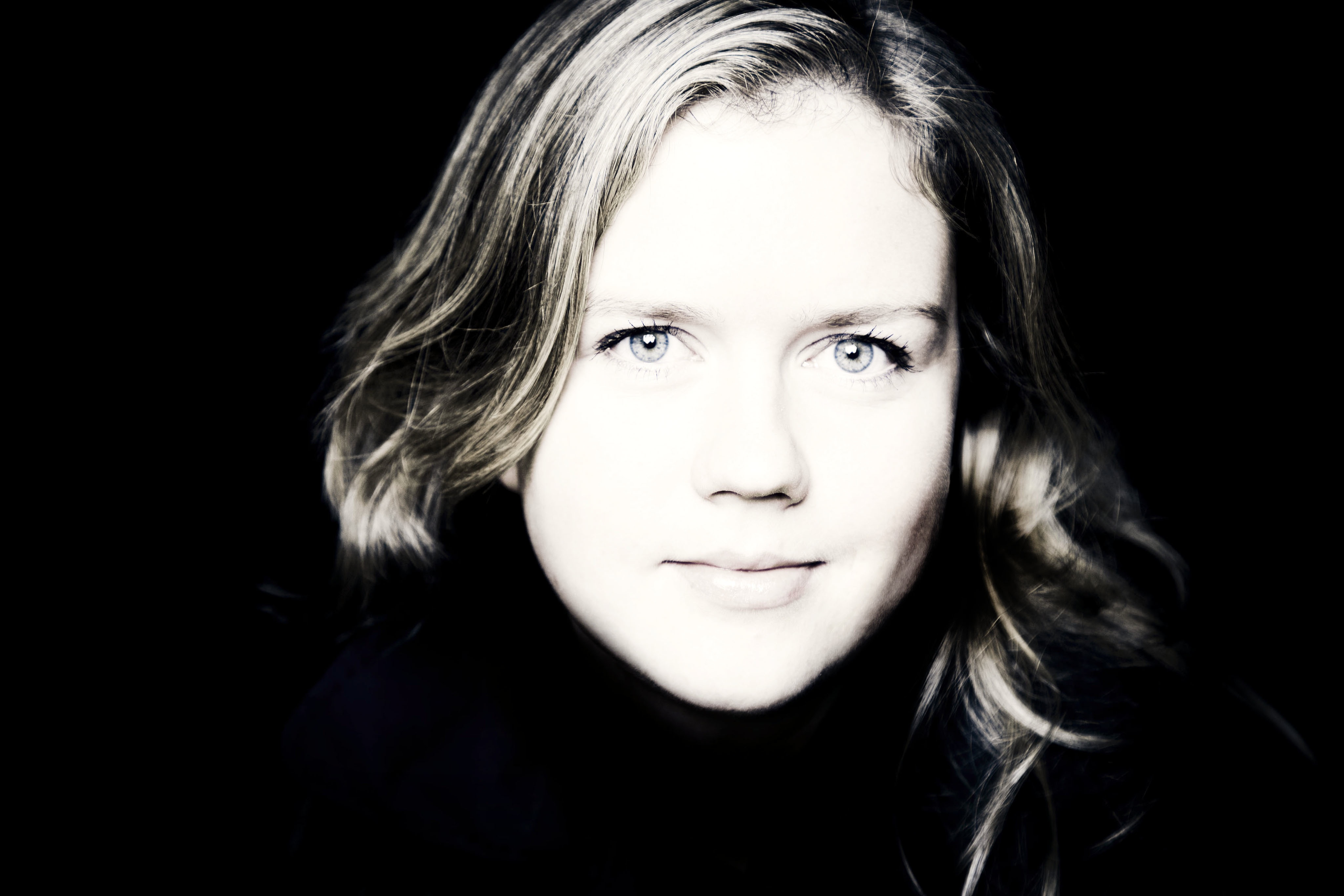
Pianist Helena Basilova

Helena Basilova is a Dutch pianist born in Russia and based in the Netherlands since 1990. Educated in the Netherlands and New York City, Basilova has championed the works of Eastern European composers such as Alexander Scriabin and Leoš Janáček with recordings on Quintone Records.

== Family ==
Helena Basilova was born in the former Soviet Union as a daughter of two pianists. Her father Alexander Basilov (1946–2007), was a prominent Russian pianist, composer and piano teacher at Gnessin State Musical College. Basilov had studied at the Moscow Conservatory with Stanislav Neuhaus, son of Heinrich Neuhaus, one of Russia's most influential piano professors.

To stretch the importance of heritage and passing on of tradition, Helena Basilova conducts research on the life and work of her father since 2012. With the help of the Dutch publisher Donemus, newly found music by Alexander Basilov has become available in 2018. The Dutch newspaper De Volkskrant wrote an article on the research.

== Career ==
Performing often in The Netherlands and abroad, Basilova has played in a number of notable halls including Concertgebouw Amsterdam, Carnegie Hall’s Weill Hall, Symphony Space NYC, the HPAC Japan and the NCPA in Mumbai. The New York Times described Basilova's playing as 'sensitively and with flair'.

To widen the scope and reach of classical music, Helena composed programs combining piano music with poetry, theatre, philosophy and visual arts. She also collaborates frequently with contemporary jazz musicians and living composers, such as Reinier Baas and Maxim Shalygin.

Helena embraces extra-musical aspects. As did Scriabin a century ago, when he combined sounds and colours. In 2016 Helena developed a visual-musical performance inspired by Scriabin together with video artists from DEFRAME collective. From this experience new collaborations followed and projects evolved with a.o. Salvador Breed, Nick Verstand, Jurjen Alkema, Vincent Rand and Boris Acket.

In addition to solo performance, Basilova is a professor of piano at the Artez Institute of the Arts.

== Awards ==
Helena Basilova was prize winner of various competitions

- Echo Klassik (2017)
- American Protégé Competition (2011)
- Vriendenkransconcours (2008) (nowadays called Dutch Classical Talent Award)
- Het Debuut (2008)
- Young Pianist Foundation Piano Competition] (2004)

== Discography ==
- Aelita Queen of Mars (2025)
- Homage to Ryuichi Sakamoto (2024)
- Morton Feldman: Triadic Memories (2020)
- A Fearful Fairy Tale (2019, TRPTK Records)
- Alexander Basilov: Selected Piano Works (2017)
- Anton Webern, Opus 7 (2017, with Diamanda La Berge Dramm (violin), EP)
- Rendez-vous Russe (2016, with Eva van Grinsven (sax) and Maria Milstein (violin), MDG Records)
- Picturing Scriabin (2015, Quintone Records)
- Janacek Piano Works (2012, Quintone Records)
