= Helena Cidade Moura =

Portuguese teacher, researcher, activist, politician and poet

- Born: Helena Tâmega Cidade; 1924
- Died: 20 July 2012 (aged 87–88); Lisbon, Portugal
- Occupations: Politician; poet, campaigner
- Known for: Campaign to improve literacy in Portugal

Helena Cidade Moura (1924 – 2012) was a Portuguese teacher, researcher, activist, politician and poet, who played an important role in the struggle to overcome the Estado Novo dictatorship in Portugal. After the overthrow of the regime, she served as a deputy in the first three legislatures of the Assembly of the Republic. She is best remembered for the leading role she played in the literacy campaign carried out in Portugal after the 25 April 1974 Carnation Revolution.

== Early life ==
Helena Tâmega Cidade Moura was born in 1924, the daughter of Professor Hernâni Cidade, a classical scholar, and Aida Tâmega. Both her parents originally came from the Alentejo region of Portugal. Moura studied Romance languages at the Faculty of Letters at the University of Lisbon. She became a major authority on the Portuguese writer José Maria de Eça de Queirós.

== Opposition to the Estado Novo ==
Before the overthrow of the Estado Novo on 25 April 1974, Moura worked with institutions and initiatives of the so-called progressive Catholics. In the 1965 elections she was a signatory of the "Manifesto of the 101", which cited the social doctrine of the Catholic Church and papal encyclicals, such as Pacem in Terris, issued in 1963, to criticise the regime's policy. She was among those to protest about the 1967 closure of the Pragma cooperative, which was a Catholic organization opposed to the Estado Novo. Together with José Manuel Tengarrinha and Luís Catarino, Moura was one of the main leaders of the Portuguese Democratic Movement/Democratic Electoral Commissions (Portuguese: Movimento Democrático Português / Comissões Democráticas Eleitorais, MDP/CDE), which was one of the most important organizations of the democratic opposition to the Estado Novo. It was founded in 1969 as an electoral coalition meant to run in the undemocratic and widely manipulated parliamentary election of that year.

== Political activities ==
Following the overthrow of the regime in 1974, Moura ran for election as a deputy, representing the MDP/CDE in the First Assembly in 1976, for the Porto constituency. She was re-elected in 1979 for Porto and in 1980 for Lisbon, serving until the fourth legislative elections in 1983.

== Literacy ==
Moura devoted much of her time to education. Under the Estado Novo little had been done to overcome Portugal's high rate of illiteracy, and addressing this problem became a priority of the democratic governments that replaced it. In 1989, she was a co-founder of CIVITAS - Associação de Defesa e Promoção dos Direitos dos Cidadão (Association for the Defense and Promotion of Citizens' Rights) and she used this structure to launch her literacy campaign.

== Other activities ==
In 1961, Moura served as a president of the Centro Nacional de Cultura (National Cultural Centre) in Lisbon. She promoted "Thursday conferences", which attracted distinguished guests. Much later, she also served on the General Council of the Mário Soares Foundation.

== Awards and honours ==
Moura was awarded the rank of Grand Officer of the Order of Liberty of Portugal on 15 January 1998.

== Publications ==
Despite Moura's love of the novelist Eça de Queirós, her own publications were of poetry rather than novels. Her three books of poetry were:

- 1954. O Mundo sem Limites (World without Limits). Da Autora, Lisbon. Poems. 47 pages.
- 1961. O Tempo e a Esperança (Time and Hope) with drawings by Nuno Siqueira. Poems. Livros de Portugal.
- 1963. Memória e ritual (Memory and Ritual). Ática, Lisbon
- In 1979, Moura published the Manual de Alfabetização (Literacy Manual). Caminho. Lisbon.

== Death ==
Helena Cidade Moura died on 20 July 2012. She had been married to Domingos Moura (1920-2007), a university professor. They had six children.
