= Helena Citrónová =

Slovak holocaust survivor (1922–2007)

- Born: 26 August 1922; Humenné, Czechoslovakia (now Slovakia)
- Died: 4 June 2007 (aged 84); Tel Aviv, Israel
- Resting place: Yarkon Cemetery
- Other name: Zippora Tahori
- Known for: Auschwitz prisoner who was romantically involved with a SS soldier

Helena Citrónová (Hebrew: הלנה ציטרון; 26 August 1922 – 4 June 2007) was a Slovak Holocaust survivor. At the Auschwitz concentration camp, she had a romantic relationship with the Austrian SS-Unterscharführer Franz Wunsch. Her story was covered in the BBC documentary series Auschwitz: The Nazis and 'The Final Solution' and served as the inspiration for the opera Helena Citrónová by the Thai composer S. P. Somtow.

== Early life ==
Citrónová was born on 26 August 1922 in the town of Humenné to a middle class Hungarian-Jewish family. Her father was a cantor and she enjoyed singing from early childhood. She had three siblings. Her older sister Róza got married and emigrated, but returned in 1939 because her husband was not able to find a job there.

== At Auschwitz ==
Citrónová arrived at Auschwitz as a part of the first mass transport of 997 Slovak Jewish girls and unmarried young women on 26 March 1942. The girls were tricked by being promised lucrative work opportunities abroad. In reality, because the Slovak government saw Jews as a social problem to be solved, it had agreed to sell the women to Nazi Germany as slave labor. In addition to transferring the Jewish women to the Nazis, the Slovak government paid the Nazis a sum of 500 Reichsmarks per person (about 200 in 1942 US Dollars) for agreeing to take the Jews from them. At Auschwitz, Citrónová worked at the Kanada warehouses, sorting possessions of deportees who had been murdered upon arrival.

In September 1942, she was ordered to sing at a birthday party of a guard. Citrónová sang the only German song she knew: Liebe war es nie, 'It was never love'. One of the guards — Franz Wunsch — noticed her singing and immediately fell in love with her. From that moment on, he would secretly send her presents and love letters and use his influence to protect her from worst punishments. Citrónová at first resented Wunsch but eventually returned his affections as a way to save her life, although it is not clear whether their relationship included physical intimacy.

In October 1944, Citrónová's sister Róza along with her husband and two children was brought to Auschwitz. Citrónová sent a secret letter begging Wunsch to save them. Wunsch immediately approached Citrónová, under the pretext of punishment for breaking of the curfew, to learn the details. He was able to save the sister who had already entered the gas chamber but not the rest of the family.

Wunsch's authority was not sufficient to protect Citrónová's other family members. Her parents were murdered in the gas chamber, while her brother committed suicide during a failed escape attempt. In January 1945 as the Soviet Army was approaching Auschwitz, Wunsch contacted Citrónová for the final time, sending her warm clothes and socks for the death march along with a final note saying "I loved you very much". She was one of the prisoners liberated by the Red Army from the camp.

== After the War ==
After the end of the World War II, Helena Citrónová and her sister Róza returned to their hometown but everybody they knew was dead. In July 1945, they emigrated to Mandatory Palestine.

In Israel, Citrónová married the Israel Defense Forces soldier David Tahori, changed her name to Zippora Tahori and had two children. She died on 4 June 2007 and is buried at the Yarkon Cemetery.

Citrónová refused all attempts of Wunsch, who located her in her new country using the Red Cross International Tracing Service, to contact her after the war. Eventually, he stopped writing to her and got married. Nonetheless, in 1972, Wunsch faced trial for his role at Auschwitz and his wife contacted Citrónová, begging her to testify at his trial. Citrónová testified she received help from Wunsch while at Auschwitz, but also confirmed that she witnessed him committing crimes against other prisoners. While testifying, she avoided eye contact with Wunsch, who was eventually released because the statute of limitations for his crimes had expired.

== Cultural influence ==
In 2003, the Israeli documentary Love in Auschwitz told the story of Helena Citrónová and Franz Wunsch for the first time. Nonetheless, the story became widely known after being covered by the 2005 BBC documentary Auschwitz: The Nazis and 'The Final Solution'.

S. P. Somtow composed his opera Helena Citrónová drawing inspiration from the BBC interview with Citrónová from the documentary. The opera premiered at the Opera Siam in Bangkok on 15 January 2020.

The Israeli director Maya Sarfaty covered the story in the movie Love It Was Not released in 2020.
