= Helena Lisická =

Helena Lisická (November 26, 1930, Olomouc – November 30, 2009) was a Czech ethnographer and writer, author of fairy tales and legends. She started her production in 1950s and wrote more than 20 writings. Outside fairy tales she wrote some plays for children. She collaborated with Folklore group Haná (Folklórní soubor Haná), together they founded folklore festival Lidový rok. Her husband was archivist Antonín Roubic.

== Works ==
- Páv zpívá o štěstí (1988)
- Zrcadlo starých časů (1985)
- Medové království (1981)
- Pověsti starých měst (1981)
- O Ječmínkovi (1979)
- Z českých a moravských hradů (1977)
- Devatero řemesel (1976)
- Řeka Morava (1975)
- Pohádky z jalovce (1972)
- Z hradů, zámků a tvrzí (1971)
- Pohádky a pověsti z Moravské brány (1968)
- Za horama za dolama (1965)
