= Helena Stjernholm =

Swedish business executive

- Born: Helena Maria Carlsson; 1970 (age 55–56)
- Education: Stockholm School of Economics
- Occupation: Business executive
- Spouse: Stefan Stjernholm
- Children: 2

Helena Maria Stjernholm (née Carlsson; born 1970) is a Swedish business executive who since September 2015 has been CEO of Industrivärden, a major Swedish investment firm. She previously spent 17 years with IK Investment Partners where she latterly had responsibility for their Stockholm office.

== Early life and education ==
Born in 1970, Helena Stjernholm was brought up in the central Swedish town of Kristinehamn where she attended Källgårdsskolan and Södermalmsskolan before opting for technical secondary school subjects at Brogårdsgymnasiet. She then spent a year in the United States as an exchange student before completing her secondary education in Karlstad. On matriculating, she took a year off, working as a replacement teacher and a healthcare assistant. She also spent four months in Austria, working in a hotel and enjoying the skiing. She then attended Linköping University where in 1994 she earned a bachelor's degree in economics. She then spent a year in Munich studying business administration and management at LMU Munich before returning to Sweden to study at the Stockholm School of Economics, earning an MSc in business administration, accounting and finance in 1997. While studying in Linköping, she met her husband Stefan Stjernholm with whom she has two sons.

== Career ==
After working for Bain & Company as a consultant (1997–98), she joined the venture capital firm IK Investment where she worked for 17 years. In 2015, she was appointed CEO of Industrivärden after Anders Nyrén left following an expenses scandal. Stjernholm also serves on the boards of Handelsbanken, SCA, Skanska and SSAB.

In March 2017, Veckans Affärer named Helena Stjernholm the most powerful Swedish businesswoman of the year. She said she was happy to have earned the title as it would inspire younger women to progress in business. She had succeeded in achieving better results not only for Industrivärden but for their holding companies Volvo, SSAB and Sandvik. She recognized that one of the most difficult sectors for women to rise to the top was in fact finance.
