= Helena Percas =

Argentine writer and scholar (1921–2011)

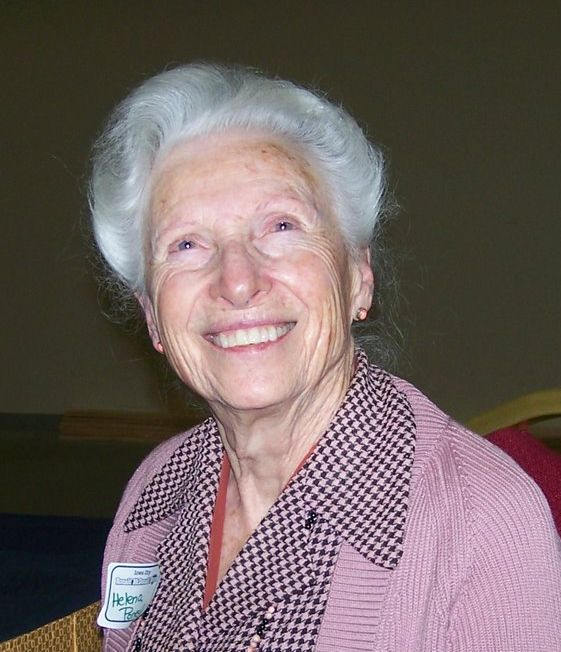
Helena Percas de Ponseti, Argentina writer and literary critic

Helena Percas de Ponseti (Valencia, Spain, January, 1921 – January 1, 2011) was a writer, essayist, scholar, and professor. She received her undergraduate degree from the Institut Maintenon in Paris, France, her master's degree from Barnard College and her Doctorate from Columbia University in New York. From 1948 to 1990 Percas was a professor in the Spanish Department of Grinnell College, in Iowa, U.S. When she retired she was named Professor Emerita, and 10 years later, she established an annual award for the most outstanding senior in the Spanish Department, Helena Percas de Ponseti Senior Award in Spanish and created a fund for research in the area of Hispanic Culture. Furthermore, she donated to the college her valuable collection of books written by Latin American women.

== Published works ==
- La poesía femenina argentina (1810-1950)
- La cueva de Montesinos, Revista Hispánica Moderna (Homenaje a Federico de Onís, I), XXXIV (1968), pp. 376–399
- Cervantes y su concepto del arte, Gredos, Madrid, 1975, 2 vols
- Sobre el enigma de los dos Cervantes, The American Hispanist, II (1977), pp. 9–11
- Los consejos de Don Quijote a Sancho, Cervantes and the Renaissance, ed. M.D. McGaha, Juan de la Cuesta, Newark, 1980, pp. 194–236
- Authorial Strings: A Recurrent Metaphor in DQ», Cervantes, I [1-2] (1981), pp. 51-62
- Tate, tate, follonzicos... Once Again: The Metamorphosis of a Locution, Cervantes, VII [2] (1987), pp. 85-89
- Cervantes the Writer and Painter of «Q.», University of Missouri Press, Columbia, 1988
- A Revision: Cervante’s Writing, Cervantes, IX [2] (1989), pp. 61-65
- Cervantes y su sentido de la lengua: traducción, Actas II, 1991, pp. 111-122
- Nota a la nota sobre una nota: “impressa”, no “empressa”, Cervantes, XV [1] (1995), pp. 164-166
- ¿Quién era Belerma?, Revista Hispánica Moderna, XLIX (1996), pp. 375-392
- Norah Lange y su Poesía, Hispania, Vol. 36, No. 1 (Feb., 1953), pp. 79-84
- Maria Dhialma Tiberti, promesa para la Argentina, Estudio, Revista Iberoamericana XVIII/36 (marzo 1953):361-368.
