= Helena Wong =

Helena Wong may refer to:

- Helena Wong (weightlifter) (born 1988), Singapore weightlifter
- Helena Wong (politician) (born 1959), Hong Kong politician, former member of the Hong Kong Legislative Council
