= Helena Jessie =

London-based Irish singer

Helena Jessie is a London-based Irish singer whose mix of jazz, disco, Latin and other influences have made her a leading proponent of the UK’s Nu Disco musical style. According to Tim Cooper, music journalist at The Sunday Times, “Helena Jessie calls herself a jazz singer, but camped-up tunes such as "Take It Like a Man" tap straight into the disco tradition”.

Jessie first came to prominence on the London jazz scene in 2007 while performing with her band, The Helena Jessie Sextet, at venues such as Ronnie Scott’s and Le Quecumbar. In the same year, Jessie won the award for Best Jazz Singer at the Irish World Awards and came to the attention of Michael Parkinson, who described her voice as “soft and sexy” on his BBC Radio 2 show. Her experimentation with a ‘gypsy jazz’ style marked an important stage in her evolution as a crossover singer.

In 2009, Jessie released her album, The Law of Attraction, produced by James Winchester, a leading figure in 1970s disco revival. Her blend of styles and incorporation of electronic beats has widened her audience and led to a new sound which she herself describes as Electro Lounge. Jessie has also been noted for her unique sense of style, combining the glamour of disco, vintage and contemporary to create a strong, feminine look.
