= Helena Jobim =

Brazilian writer (1931–2015)

Helena Isaura Brasileiro de Almeida Jobim (Rio de Janeiro, February 27, 1931 — Belo Horizonte, September 13, 2015) was a Brazilian writer.

== Life ==
She was Tom Jobim's sister.

She studied Portuguese and Brazilian literature at the Pontifical Catholic University of Rio de Janeiro.

She published her first novel A chave do poço do abismo with Vânia Reis e Silva in 1968.

Film director Marco Altberg adapted her Trilogia do assombro into the film Fonte da Saudade.

She worked for the publication Estado de Minas.

== Works ==
- A chave do poço do abismo, 1968
- Clareza 5, 1974
- Trilogia do assombro, 1981
- Os lábios brancos do medo, poetry, 1985
- Verão de Tigres, 1990
- Antonio Carlos Jobim, um homem iluminado, biography, Tom Jobim, 1996
- Pressinto os Anjos que me Perseguem , 2000
- Recados da Lua, 2001
