= Helena Vatanen =

Finnish politician

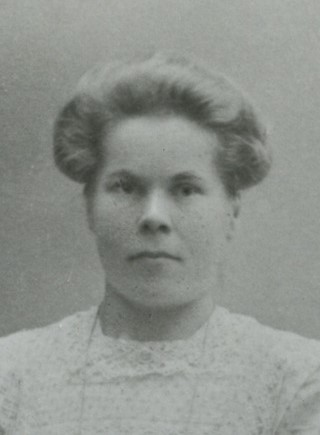
Helena Vatanen

Helena Vatanen (née Immonen; 28 December 1871, in Eno – 16 April 1937) was a Finnish farmworker's wife and politician. She was a member of the Parliament of Finland from 1911 to 1913, representing the Social Democratic Party of Finland (SDP).
