= Jerzy Płaczkiewicz =

Polish historian (born 1946)

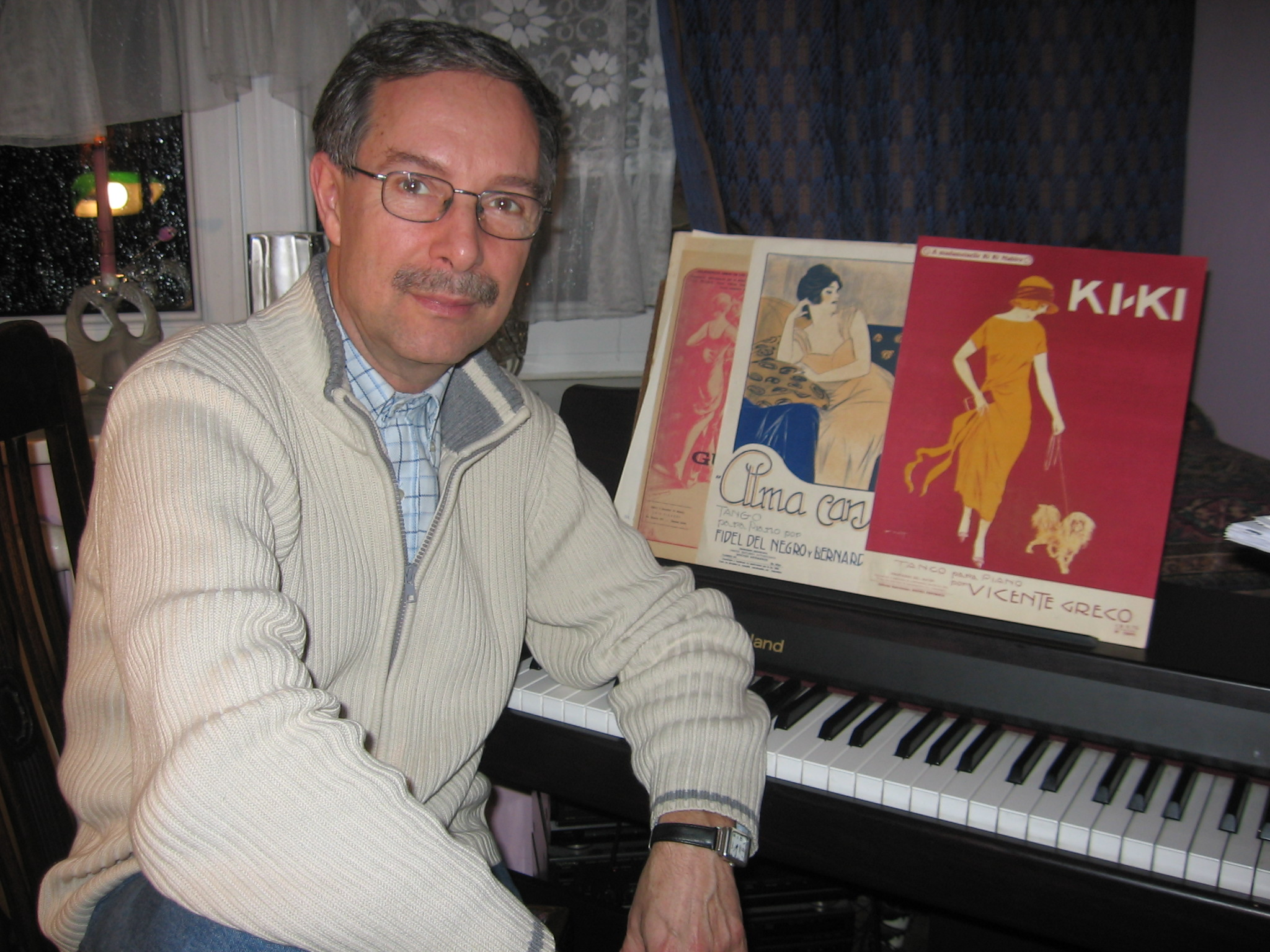
Jerzy Płaczkiewicz

Jerzy Płaczkiewicz (born April 18, 1946, in Katowice) is a contemporary Polish historian of music, radio personality, and author of songs.

== Life ==
He was born in 1946 in Katowice. His mother was Lili Larys actress and dancer in pre Second World War Poland. In 1980, he provided commentaries on old recordings on national edition of Polish Radio III. Between 1990 and 2000, for Polish Radio III, he wrote: Muzyczne wspomnienie o Marlenie Dietrich, Tajemnicza Pani Zarah Leander, Stare Rosyjskie Sentymentalne Tango, Rosjanie lubili nasze piosenki, Droga Pani Kalino !, Głosy spoza czasu, Głosy prosto z nieba, Urzeczone Paryżem, Wszystko zaczęło się w Buenos aires, Pola - Apolonia - Polita (Pola Negri). For Polish Radio I he wrote: Dancingi dawnej Warszawy, Czasami jeszcze słychać ich głosy (about Jewish recordings). Between 1998 and 2004 he was author of Sekrety starych płyt: Na uliczce w Barcelonie, Przed wojną byłem w Moskwie z interesem, Płyta ma sto lat!, Te głosy stworzył mikrofon, Niespodziewane interpretacje, Bukiet nieśmiertelników, Warszawo, piękna Warszawo !, Jestesmy w Krakowie - rok 1926!, Wielka radość we Lwowie!, Miasto dobrych gospodarzy - Poznań, Gdańsk, lata 30, Magiczne Wilno, Polesie, Polesie, Dzielnica żydowska wielkiego miasta and radio series Historia świata na tle historii fonografii (World history as seen by history of recordings).

In 2005, he compiled and edited Polskie Tango 1929-1939 Old World Tangos Vol. 3. In 2005 he received the Pasja, czyli sposób na życie (Passion - prescription for life) award. In 2007 he published Pola Negri śpiewa! in publication of the Cinematography Museum in Łodź. On YouTube, as jurek46pink, he maintains extensive library of Polish and Central European songs, including old tangos and interviews with Wiera Gran. In 2008, he participated in documentary movie about Hanka Ordonówna and her recordings made in Warsaw between 1927 and 1938. He has been influential in promoting fading memory about Wiera Gran, singer largely forgotten in her native Poland. In particular, in 2011 he was consultant for the Wiera Gran documentary movie directed by Maria Zmarz-Koczanowicz.

Płaczkiewicz compiled and edited "Polskie Tango 1929-1939 Old World Tangos Vol. 3". He maintains unique collection of Polish archival music and writes on history of tango and had his own radio show ("Sekrety starych plyt" - "Secrets of old recordings") devoted to old music. His articles on tango history trace roots of tangos of Argentinian origin in Poland as well as influence of Polish tango on world tango scene.

His songs were performed by Anna German.
