= Helena Tuuri =

Finnish diplomat

Helena Tuuri is a Finnish diplomat. She has been the Finnish Ambassador to Prague, since 15 August 2014. She joined the service of the Ministry for Foreign Affairs in 1987.

Before her Ambassador's post, from 2008 Tuuri was Head of the Foreign Ministry's Africa and Middle East Department.

She has also been a member of the Ministry's departments of Commerce, Law, and European and Development Cooperation. Tuuri also worked as Deputy Head of EU Secretariat and Adviser for the Prime Minister at the Council of State as well as in the Finnish Parliament as Committee Counselor in the Grand Committee. She has also worked at the Finnish Embassy in Paris and at the Finnish EU Delegation in Brussels.
