= Helena Lehtinen =

Finnish designer (born 1952)

- Born: 1952 (age 73–74); Lahti
- Occupation: Contemporary jeweller

Helena Lehtinen (born 1952) is a Finnish contemporary jeweller and teacher.

Lehtinen was born in Lahti and spent her childhood in Nastola, Finland. After studying silversmithing at the Lahti Goldsmith School from 1973 to 1977, she travelled to Norway and Germany where she became familiar with works of the Swiss jeweler Otto Kûnzli which made profound impact on her later choices.

Together with Tarja Tuupanen and Eija Mustonen, Lehtinen formed Hibernate group in 1999. In 2000 she graduated with the designer degree from Lahti Polytechnic. She was teaching in Konstfack, Stockholm as a senior lecturer from 2004 to 2006 and facilitated courses at the South Carelia Polytechnics, Lappeenranta and at the Goldsmith School, Lahti. In 2013 she received an international Herbert Hoffman Prize and Finnish Jewellery Art Association awarded her Jewellery Artist of the Year in 2015.

Helena Lehtinen's work is exhibited to the public internationally and held in collections including the Marzee Collection, the Design Museum Helsinki, the Lars and Helena Pahlman Collection, the Röhsska Museum in Gothenburg and Die Neue Sammlung in Munich.

Of her work, Lehtinen said in 2012, "A theme I work now is landscapes, inner landscapes, it sounds deep, but I love things that are not superfluous. My works are about memories from my family, my past; fragments, objects, photos without a camera. Identity is not stable but in constant movement and change. I'm in between minimalism and kitsch; I hate and love both of them."

== Sources ==
- Helena Lehtinen
- Archived copy
- From the Coolest Corner – Nordic Jewellery, editor Widar Halén, p. 92
