= Helena Duailibe =

Brazilian physician and politician (born 1958)

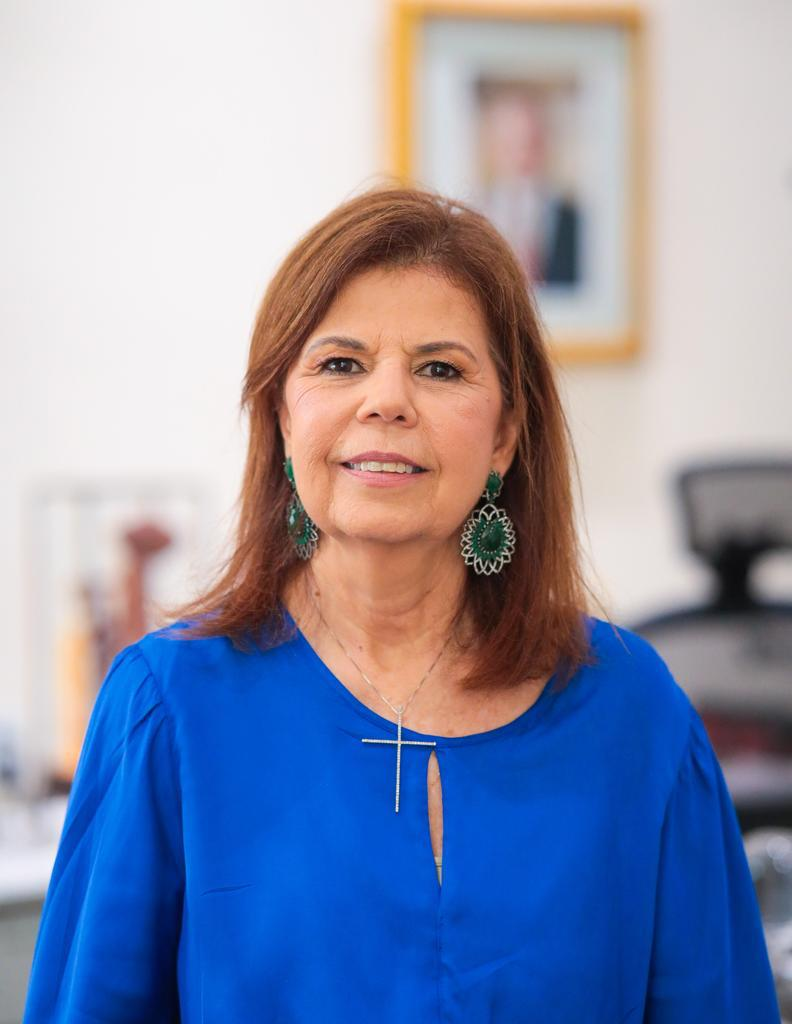

Municipal Secretary of Health of São Luís
- In office January 31, 2014 – July 24, 2017
- In office January 1, 2009 – March 31, 2012

Councilwoman of São Luís
- In office January 1, 2013 – January 31, 2014

Vice-mayor of São Luís
- In office January 1, 2009 – December 31, 2012

Health Secretary of Maranhão
- In office April 5, 2002 – January 1, 2007

Personal details
- Born: Helena Maria Duailibe Ferreira; December 30, 1958 (age 67) São Luís, MA
- Party: PMDB
- Spouse: Afonso Manoel
- Occupation: Politician
- Profession: Physician

Helena Maria Duailibe Ferreira (born December 30, 1958) is a Brazilian physician and politician. She was Health Secretary of Maranhão (2002–2007), and later Vice-Mayor (2009–2012) and councilwoman for the state (2013–2014). Duailibe was also a Municipal Secretary of Health. She is married to Afonso Manoel.
