= Helena Spinacuta =

Swedish actress, acrobat and tightrope artist (1766–1846)

Helena Spinacuta (Gothenburg, 1766 – Trelleborg, 1846), was a Swedish stage actress, acrobat, and tightrope artist. She was married to the famous Italian (Venetian) acrobat Antonio Bartolomeo Spinacuta.

== Life ==
Helena Spinacuta was born Ellna Persdotter, daughter of Per Mårtensson and Karna Persdotter. Her father was an employee of the cathedral of Gothenburg.

=== Stage career ===
Her brother Johan Pettersson was an actor, and she herself was engaged as a stage actor at the Gothenburg theatre Comediehuset in 1783–1785. Before her marriage, she called herself Helena Pettersson.

In 1784, she married the Italian artist Spinacuta, who performed as a guest artist at the theatre and who was at that time one of the most appreciated entertainers in Sweden. In the spring of 1786, the couple performed in Lund and Malmö, where they released the first hot air balloons in Sweden, followed by a performance in Copenhagen.

On August 23, 1786, Helena Spinacuta debuted as an actor in Stockholm at Stenborg Theatre: she was engaged by the theatre as an actor, he as an acrobat to perform in the pauses. She performed in the part of Susanna in Susanna i Babylon. She made a remarkable success during her short time in Stockholm: poems where dedicated to her in the papers and the theatre direction was met with demands to have her repeat the role so that everyone may have the time to see her before she left the city when her spouse announced that they would be leaving. Apparently, she made a great impression upon the public, and she is frequently described by her critics as extraordinary beautiful.

From December 1786 to May 1787, the Spinacuta couple toured the Swedish country side with a group of actors from the Stenborg Theatre and her brother Johan: she acted, while her spouse performed dance, acrobatics and sang. They are last mentioned in Sweden 5 May 1787, are likely to have left the country thereafter.

=== Circus career and later life ===
In 1795, she was engaged with her spouse by the Ricketts company cirkus in Philadelphia in USA. In 1796, she performed a two-horse Roman riding act, which was referred to as "never before attempted by any woman in this country"

Her spouse was a member of the Masonic Lodge in Philadelphia, and in 1807, she applied to the Lodge for assistance for the sake of herself and her children, who were destituted after the death of her husband. She returned to Sweden in 1810. From 1814 onward, she lived in Trelleborg with her sister Karna, who was married to a baker there.
