= Helena Hietanen =

Finnish artist (born 1963)

- Born: 1963 (age 62–63)
- Education: University of Art and Design Helsinki
- Occupations: Textile designer, artist, sculptor
- Spouse: Jaakko Niemelä

Helena Hietanen (born 1963) is a Finnish artist who lives and works in Helsinki. Her work often uses optical fiber in the construction of textiles.

== Personal life ==
She studied at the University of Art and Design Helsinki (now Aalto University School of Arts, Design and Architecture). She is married to fellow artist Jaakko Niemelä, with whom she has repeatedly exhibited.

== Exhibitions ==
1. Galerie Anhava, Helsinki, Finland 1996
2. Illuminazione, The Venice Biennale, Venice, Italy 1997
3. Helsinki – Arsenal, Kunsthalle, Riga, Latvia 1997
4. Ume.Se, Umeå, Sweden 1998
5. The Czech Museum of Fine Arts, Prague, Czech Republic 1999
6. Les Champs de la Sculpture 2000, Paris, France 1999
7. Internationale Kunstmesse, Berlin, Germany 2000
