= Helena Nelson =

British poet

- Born: 1953 (age 72–73); Knutsford
- Education: University of Manchester; University of York
- Occupations: Poet and publisher
- Notable work: Starlight on Water

Helena Nelson (born 1953) is a poet, critic, publisher and the founding editor of HappenStance Press. She has lived in Fife, Scotland, since 1977.

== Early life and education ==
Nelson was born in Knutsford in Cheshire, England. She attended the Universities of York and Manchester, achieving a BA Hons in English Literature, and an MA in eighteenth century literature respectively. She worked for 25 years as a tutor in English and Communication at Fife College.

== Poetry career and awards ==
Spectrum magazine were first to publish Nelson's work in 1992, followed by The Dark Horse. She won the Keats Shelley Memorial Association Millennium Competition in 2000, with an essay about Keats. In 2001, Nelson's debut pamphlet Mr and Mrs Philpott on Holiday at Auchterawe, & Other Poems was published by Kettillonia Press, the independent publisher established by novelist and poet James Robertson. Her first full collection, Starlight on Water, was published in 2003 by The Rialto Press and was a joint winner of the Jerwood Aldeburgh Prize. Her work was also included in the 2003 Modern Scottish Women Poets anthology.

In 2005, she created HappenStance Press, using her own pamphlet, Unsuitable Poems, as the pilot publication. The press receives no public funding, but survives on subscription and sales. It specialises in poetry pamphlets, and has published well over 100 poets, focusing mainly on UK-based authors and first collections. In 2010, HappenStance Press won the Michael Marks Publishers' Award. Nelson also published twelve issues of a magazine called Sphinx, focused on poetry pamphlet publishing. Sphinx still survives as an online repository for poetry pamphlet reviews and articles about pamphlet publishers. In 2013 Nelson published Fife Place Name Limericks, based on poems written for a Fife Libraries competition in the early 1990s and illustrated by Gillian Rose.

Nelson occasionally runs workshops and talks on small-press publishing and reviewing. In 2004 she took part in One Thousand Lines, the first schools tour by The Poetry Trust, alongside Matt Harvey and Neil Rollinson. She has delivered a number of workshops on getting poetry published, and her advisory pamphlet How (not) to Get Your Poetry Published was expanded to a book-length guide in 2016, and reprinted in 2017. She was an invited guest and speaker at the 2016 Scottish Women's Poetry Symposium organised by the University of Edinburgh.

== Poetry in the age of hype and hypermedia ==
In 2013, Nelson had a review essay, Poetry in the Age of Hype, published in the poetry journal, The Dark Horse, which questioned whether poetry can be 'overblurbed'; whereby, in attempting to reach new audiences and create greater interest not just in the book but also in poetry itself, publishers may be overloading their praise to the extent of posing a problem for poets attempting to live up to the 'hype'.

Nelson's thoughtful take caused the writer & poet Kei Miller to riff on this theme in his follow-up article in 2014, Poetry in the Age of Hypermedia. In his essay, Miller expands the discussion further by examining the role hypermedia (Tweets, Facebook posts, online reviews etc.) plays in carrying the hype to potential readers. Miller contends that the World Wide Web is the most obvious example of hypermedia and that poetry must find a way to live with this world in establishing a place for itself in the future.

"The age of hypermedia seems to prove there is still an audience hungry for poetry, whether it be the kind of poetry that articulates communal experiences and emotions or the kind that tries to give insight into particular experiences. It will be interesting to see, in the future, how this audience continues to shape poetry and, indeed, to create the poets they need. I think what this large audience demands, as any audience should, is simply a poetry which they can access intellectually, which turns its face towards them and considers them as worthy people to write for.... The future seems to want a poet who is as conversant with a perfect line of Shakespeare as they are with a perfect Tweet, poets who might consider adding to their literary craft with knowledge of video and sound production or HTML coding. The future is knocking. Welcome the hyperpoem!"

== Selected works ==
=== Poetry ===
- Mr and Mrs Philpott on Holiday at Auchterawe & Other Poems (2001)
- Starlight on Water (2003)
- Unsuitable Poems (2005)
- The sorry I never said... (2008)
- The Unread Squirrel: More Unsuitable Poems (2009)
- Plot and Counter-Plot (2010)
- Fife Place Name Limericks (2013)
- Down with Poetry! (2016)

=== Other works ===
- The HappenStance Story: Chapter One (2006)
- The HappenStance Story: Chapter Two (2007)
- The HappenStance Story: Chapter Three (2008)
- The HappenStance Story: Chapter Four (2010)
- The HappenStance Story: Chapter Five (2011)
- The HappenStance Story: Chapter Six (2012)
- The HappenStance Story: Chapter Seven (2013)
- The HappenStance Story: Chapter Eight (2014)
- The HappenStance Story: Chapter Nine: The Last Chapter (2015)
- How (Not) to Get Your Poetry Published (2016)
