= Helena Morsztynkiewiczowa =

Polish architect (1894-1983)

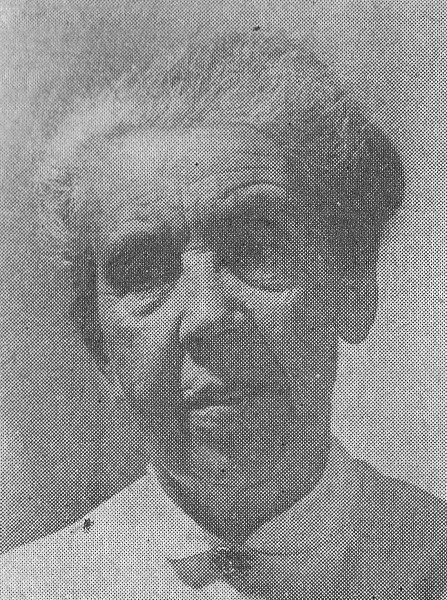
- Born: 1894
- Died: July 2, 1983 (aged 88–89); Warsaw
- Education: Warsaw University of Technology
- Occupation: Architect
- Buildings: Piaski

Helena Kurkiewicz-Morsztynkiewiczowa (1894 – July 2, 1983 in Warsaw) was a Polish architect and urban planner. During World War I, she was active in a Polish military organization.

== Education and career ==
Helena Morsztynkiewiczowa graduated from the Faculty of Architecture of the Warsaw University of Technology In 1928. She designed Spatial planning for Polish cities, including: Busko-Zdrój, Falenica, Otwock, Zakopane, the Oksywie estate in Gdynia together with the Workers' Colony Estate. Her plans also included Mokotów Field in Warsaw, Piaski, Żerań and Żoliborz.

From 1935, She was an evaluator of the Urban Planning Commission of the Association of Polish Cities. During the Polish Housing Congress in 1937, on behalf of a group of architects, she presented revolutionary proposals for social housing and cheap construction, identifying the Polish government as the regulator of land prices for such development and the buyer of the land. For city-wide purposes, she was the editor of the "Urban Planning Bulletin".

During World War II, she worked in the "U" Studio of the Warsaw Housing Cooperative. She belonged to the team led by Zygmunt Skibnevski, which planned the development of the northern part of the left-bank Warsaw. From 1945 she worked in the Department of Reconstruction of the Capital. She was an honorary member of the Association of Polish Town Planners.

== Death ==
She was buried at the Powązki Cemetery in Warsaw (card no. 5-2-236).

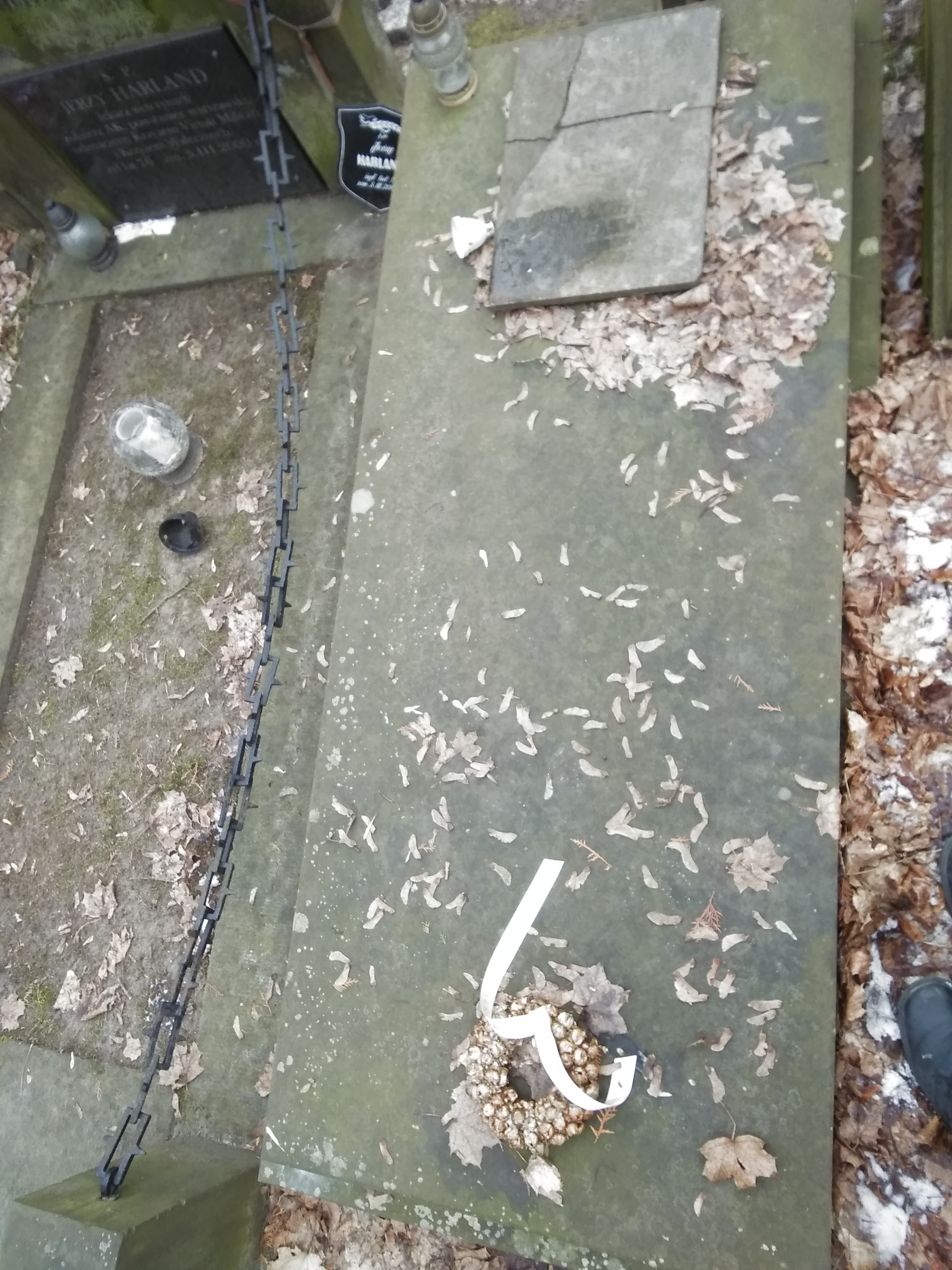
Helena Morsztynkiewicz's grave at the Powązki Cemetery

== Awards ==
- Cross of Independence 1919.
- Golden Badge of the Reconstruction of Warsaw 1947.
- Silver Badge of the Reconstruction of Warsaw 1950.
- Gold Cross of Merit 1954 and 1956.
- Silver Cross of Merit.
- Bronze Cross of Merit.
- Medal of the 10th Anniversary of People's Poland.

== Bibliography ==
- Waldorff, Jerzy (1984). Cmentarz Powązkowski w Warszawie (in Polish). Warszawa: Krajowa Agencja Wydawnicza. ISBN 978-83-03-00758-2.
- Barucki, Tadeusz (2000). Fragmenty stuletniej historii 1899-1999 (in Polish). Warszawa: Stowarzyszenie Architektów Polskich. Oddział. ISBN 83-901976-6-9.
- Warszawski Kalendarz Ilustrowany "Stolicy" [Warsaw Illustrated Calendar "Capitals"]. Warsaw Illustrated Weekly Publishing House "Stolica". 1961. p. 144.
