= Apple–EU tax dispute =

Tax dispute involving Apple, Ireland, and the EU

European investigation into Apple's tax deal with Ireland
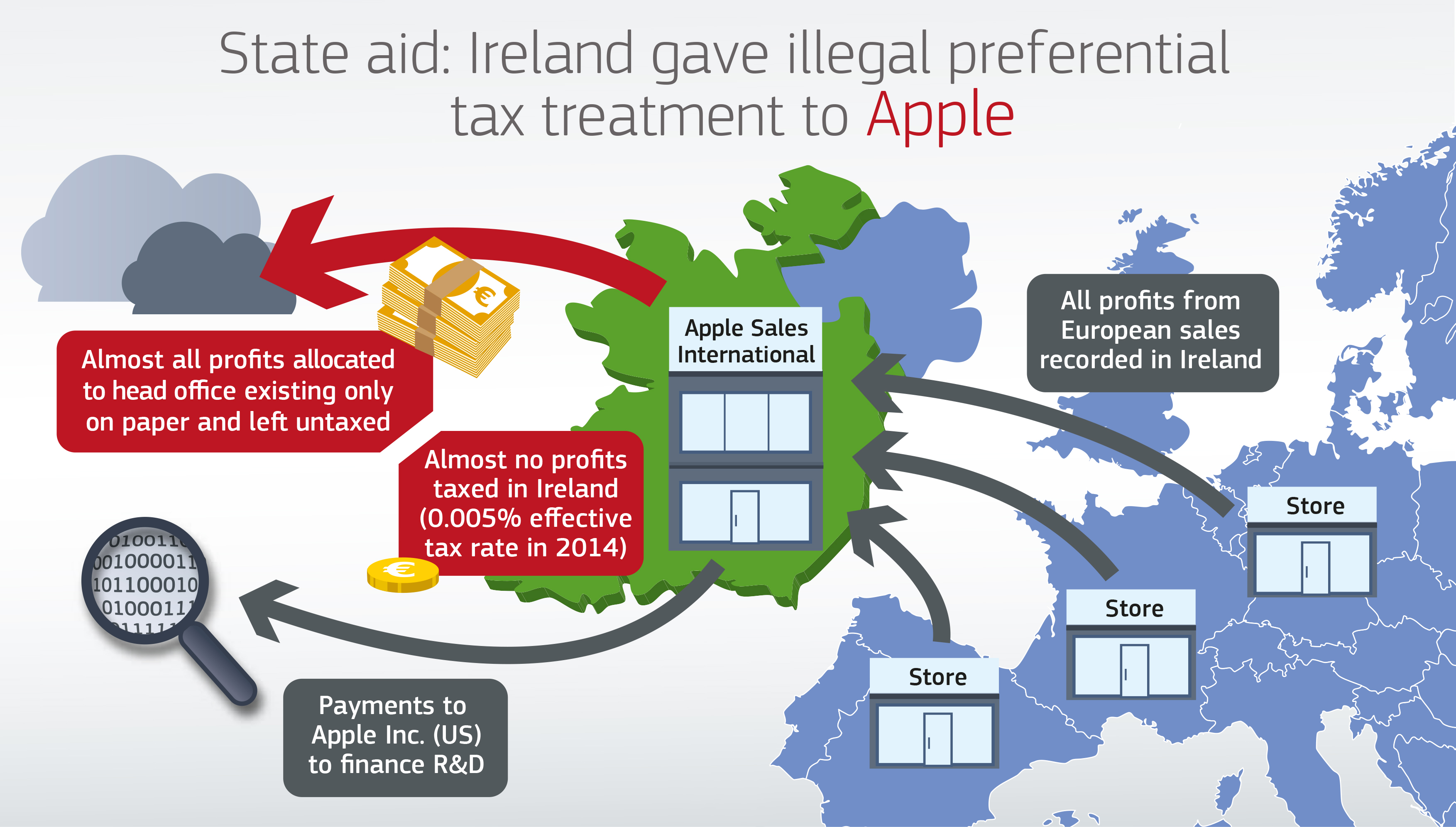
- Type of project: Investigation under EU state aid rules
- Owner: European Commission
- Key people: Margrethe Vestager, Tim Cook, Helena Malikova, Michael Noonan
- Established: 29 August 2016
- Disestablished: 10 September 2024
- Status: European Court of Justice confirmed European Commission's decision

Commission Decision (EU) 2017/1283

Decided 30 August 2016
- Case: C/2016/5605
- CelexID: 32017D1283
- Language of proceedings: English

Ireland and Others v European Commission
- Court of First Instance

Decided 15 July 2020
- Case: T‑778/16, T‑892/16
- ECLI: ECLI:EU:T:2020:338
- Chamber: Seventh
- Language of proceedings: English

Court composition
- President; Marc van der Woude
- Judge Rapporteur; Vesna Tomljenović
- Judges: Anna Marcoulli; Jan M. Passer; Alexander Kornezov

Keywords
- State aid — Aid implemented by Ireland — Decision declaring the aid incompatible with the internal market and unlawful and ordering recovery of the aid — Advance tax decisions (tax rulings) — Selective tax advantages — Arm's length principle

European Commission v Ireland and Apple Sales International
- European Court of Justice

Decided 10 September 2024
- Case: C-465/20 P
- ECLI: ECLI:EU:C:2024:724
- Chamber: Grand
- Language of proceedings: English

Court composition
- President; Koen Lenaerts
- Judge Rapporteur; Nils Wahl
- Judges: Lars Bay Larsen (Vice-President); Küllike Jürimäe; Constantinos Lycourgos; Eugene Regan; Thomas von Danwitz; Zoltán Csehi; Octavia Spineanu-Matei; Marko Ilešič; Jean-Claude Bonichot; Irmantas Jarukaitis; Andreas Kumin; Niilo Jääskinen; Miroslav Gavalec
- Advocate General; Giovanni Pitruzzella

Keywords
- Appeal – State aid – Article 107(1) TFEU – Tax rulings issued by a Member State – Selective tax advantages – Allocation of profits generated by intellectual property licences to branches of non-resident companies – Arm’s length principle

The Apple–EU tax dispute is an investigation by the European Commission into tax arrangements between Apple and Ireland, which allowed the company to pay close to zero corporate tax over 10 years.

On 29 August 2016, after a two-year investigation, European Commission ordered Apple to pay €13 billion, plus interest, in unpaid Irish taxes during 2004–2014 to the Irish state. It was the largest corporate tax fine (in fact a recovery order, technically not a fine) in history. Helena Malikova, an EU civil servant, was credited with uncovering the extent of the tax avoidance by Apple, namely that the company was paying only 0.005 per cent tax on profits booked through its Irish subsidiary. In November 2016, the Irish government formally appealed the ruling, claiming there was no violation of Irish tax law, and that the Commission's action was "an intrusion into Irish sovereignty", as national tax policy is excluded from EU treaties. In November 2016, Apple CEO Tim Cook announced Apple would appeal, and in September 2018, Apple put €13 billion into an escrow account, pending appeal. In July 2020, the European General Court struck down the EU tax decision as illegal, ruling in favor of Apple.

The issue was Apple's variation of the Double Irish tax system, which, from 2004 to 2014, Apple used to shield €110.8 billion of non–US profits from tax.

On 9 January 2015, Apple informed the Commission (Note: Revealed when the EU Commission published its full COMMISSION DECISION (S.A 38373), page 42 section 2.5.7 Apple's new corporate structure in Ireland as of 2015.) that it closed its hybrid–Double Irish, base erosion and profit shifting (BEPS) tool. In Q1 2015, Apple restructured into a new Irish BEPS tool called the Capital Allowances for Intangible Assets (CAIA) tool, also called the Green Jersey. Apple's Q1 2015 restructuring required a 12 July 2016 restatement of Irish 2015 GDP, which increased it by 26.3 per cent (later revised to 34.4 per cent); the restatement was called "leprechaun economics", and led to new EU inquiries in 2017, and accusations in June 2018, that Ireland was the world's largest tax haven.

Ireland's rejection of the EU Commission's "windfall" in back-taxes surprised some.

On 15 July 2020, the European General Court ruled that the Commission "did not succeed in showing to the requisite legal standard" that Apple had received tax advantages from Ireland, and ruled in favour of Apple.

The European Commission appealed the decision of the lower court before the European Court of Justice, the supreme court in matters of EU law.

On 10 September 2024 the European Court of Justice set aside the judgment of the lower General Court, which previously overturned the Commission’s decision, by reasoning that it contained legal errors. The 2016 decision by the European Commission was fully reinstated in this final judgement. As a consequence Apple was ordered to pay €13 billion in additional Irish taxes.

== Background ==
=== History of Apple in Ireland ===
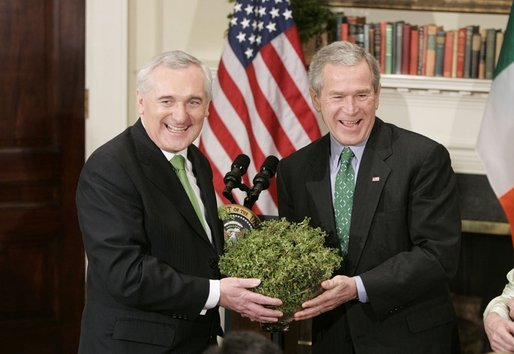
On 14 September 2016, former Irish Taoiseach Bertie Ahern (from 1997 to 2008) said that the Irish Revenue Commissioners kept the Apple 1991 and 2007 tax rulings secret from the Irish Cabinet.

On 23 December 1980, Apple opened production facilities in Holyhill, Cork. By 1990, the number of jobs had grown from 700 jobs to 1000 permanent jobs, as well as 500 sub-contractors. Interview excerpts, published by European Commission, found that this information was used in the way of background information by a tax adviser representing Apple during meetings with Apple in 1990.

By November 2016, Apple employed 6,000 people in Ireland, almost all of whom were in the Apple Hollyhill Cork plant. The Cork plant is Apple's only self-operated manufacturing plant in the world (Apple otherwise always contracts to third-party manufacturers). Holyhill is considered a low-technology facility, building iMacs to order by hand, and in this regard is more akin to a global logistics hub for Apple (albeit located on the island of Ireland). No research is carried out in the facility. Unusually for a plant, over 700 of the 6,000 employees work from home (the largest remote percentage of any Irish technology company).

Apple's unusual Cork plant can be seen in the context of the job thresholds Ireland places on US multinationals making use of the main Irish BEPS tools, which provide effective Irish tax rates of 0–2.5%, but require specific employment quotas; and give more "substance" to the BEPS tool.

=== Apple's Irish structure ===
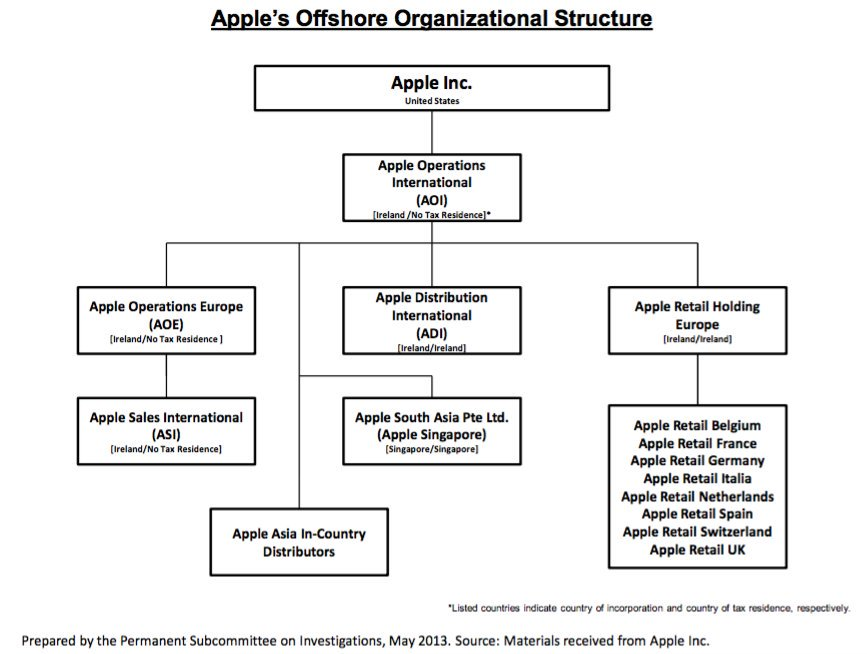
Apple's Offshore Organisational Structure (2013 Senate Report)

In 2014, Apple's Irish structure consisted of two subsidiaries: Apple Operations Ireland ("AOI") and Apple Sales International ("ASI"). AOI is an Irish-registered holding company which acts as an internal financing company. AOI claimed tax residence in Bermuda and thus, is not an Irish tax resident (the use of such a company in corporate tax structuring is sometimes referred to as a "Bermuda Black Hole"). The EU Commission State Aid recovery order does not pertain to AOI.

ASI, on the other hand, is the focus of the EU Commission's recovery order(and was the focus of 2013 Senate Investigation). ASI is an Irish-registered subsidiary of Apple Operations Europe ("AOE"). Both AOE and ASI are parties to an Irish advanced pricing agreement which took place in 1991. This agreement was updated in 2007. ASI is the vehicle through which Apple routed €110.8 billion in non–US profits from 2004 to 2014, inclusive.

Table 1: Estimate of profits shifted through Apple's Irish subsidiary, Apple Sales International ("ASI"), from 2004 to 2014
Year	ASI profit shifted (USD m)	Average €/$ rate	ASI profit shifted (EUR m)	Irish corp. tax rate	Irish corp. tax avoided (EUR m)
2004	268	.805	216	12.5%	27
2005	725	.804	583	12.5%	73
2006	1,180	.797	940	12.5%	118
2007	1,844	.731	1,348	12.5%	168
2008	3,127	.683	2,136	12.5%	267
2009	4,003	.719	2,878	12.5%	360
2010	12,095	.755	9,132	12.5%	1,141
2011	21,855	.719	15,714	12.5%	1,964
2012	35,877	.778	27,915	12.5%	3,489
2013	32,099	.753	24,176	12.5%	3,022
2014	34,229	.754	25,793	12.5%	3,224
Total	147,304		110,831		13,853

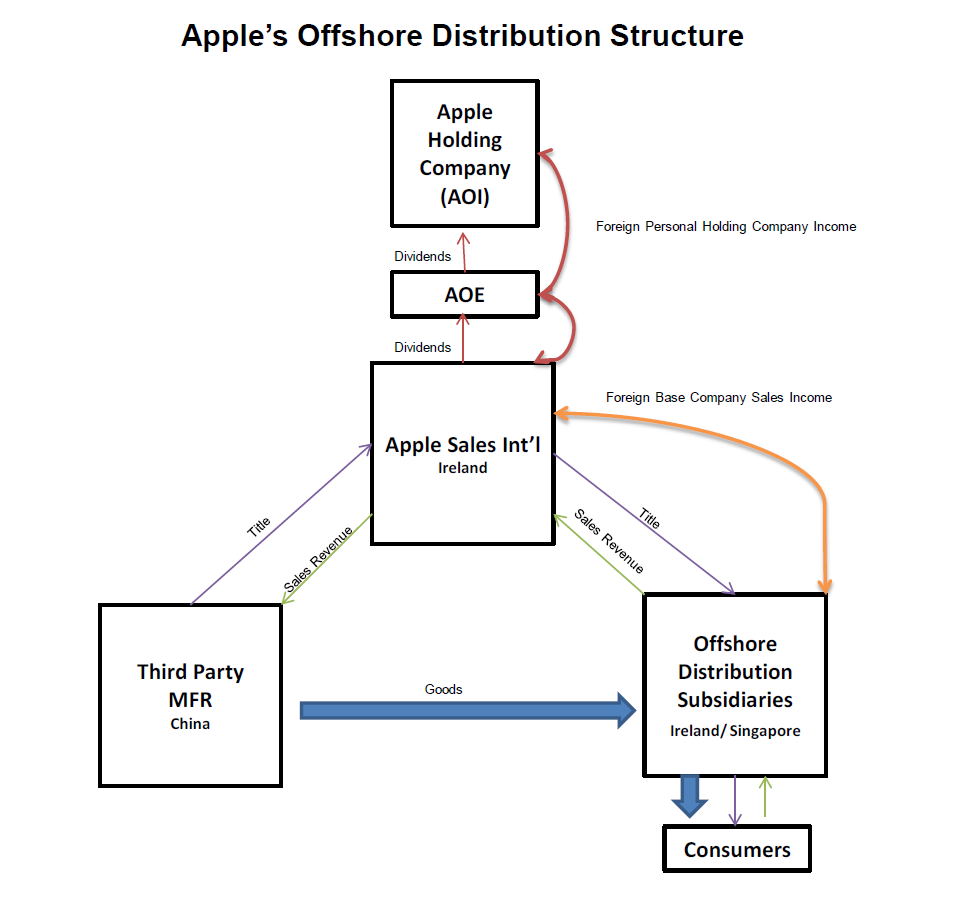
Apple's IP–based BEPS tools, which was mainly the Double Irish BEPS scheme (2013 Senate Report)

ASI's 2014 structure was an adaptation of a Double Irish scheme, an Irish IP–based BEPS tool used by many US multinationals. Apple did not follow the traditional Double Irish structure of using two separate Irish companies. Instead, Apple used two separate "branches" inside one single company, namely ASI. It is this "branch structure" the EU Commission alleged was illegal State aid, as it was not offered to other multinationals in Ireland, which had used the traditional "two separate companies" version of the Double Irish BEPS tool. Under the Double Irish structure, one Irish subsidiary (IRL1) is an Irish registered company selling products to non–US locations from Ireland. The other Irish subsidiary (IRL2) is "registered" in Ireland, but "managed and controlled" from a tax haven such as Bermuda. The Irish tax code considers IRL2 a Bermuda company (used the "managed and controlled" test), but the US tax code considers IRL2 an Irish company (uses the registration test). Neither taxes it. Apple's subsidiary, ASI, behaved like it was IRL2, it was "managed and controlled" via ASI Board meetings in Bermuda, so Irish Revenue did not tax it. But ASI also did all the functions of IRL1, making circa €110.8 billion of profits from non–US sales. The EU Commission contest IRL1's actions made ASI Irish, and the functions of IRL1 over-rode the Bermuda Board meetings in deciding the "managed and controlled" test. The commission had not brought any cases against US multinationals using the standard double two separate companies Irish BEPS tool.

Apple's unique ASI structure, is believed to be the reason why Apple never had an Apple retail store in the Republic of Ireland (it even has one in smaller Belfast).

In May 2013, Apple's tax practices were examined by a US bipartisan investigation of the Senate Permanent Subcommittee on Investigation. The investigation aimed to examine whether Apple used offshore structures, in conjunction with arrangements, to shift profits from the US to Ireland. Senators Carl Levin and John McCain drew light on what they referred to as a special tax arrangement between Apple and Ireland which allowed Apple to pay a corporate tax rate of less than 2%.

== EU investigation ==
=== Investigation (2014) ===
In June 2014, an investigation was opened by the European Commissioner for Competition on behalf of the EU Commission (SA 38373). The Ireland case was opened in conjunction with two other similar cases; involving Starbucks (Netherlands) and Fiat (Luxembourg). The investigation was led for the European Commission by the Slovak national Helena Malikova, together with a small team of four people. The Commissioners noted concerns that discretion in transfer pricing rules had been used to give Apple selective advantage. They believed that this violated Article 107(1) of the Treaty on the Functioning of the European Union (TFEU). Article 107(1) states that aid granted by member states cannot threaten to distort competition. They examined Irish tax rulings from 1991 and 2007 by the Irish Office of the Revenue Commissioners. The Commission referred to taxable profit allocated to the Irish branches of AOE and ASI. The Commission claimed the pricing arrangement between Apple and Ireland was not supported by an economic assessment and was in part supported by employment considerations.

=== Finding (2016) ===
On 30 August 2016, the Commission released a 4-page press release describing its decision and rationale. The EU Commission's full 130-page report on its State aid findings, including partially redacted information on Apple's Irish business (e.g. profits, employees, Board minutes etc.), was released on 19 December 2016. According to PwC, the full report by the European Commission contained very detailed analysis of the transfer pricing methodology used by Apple.

According to the commission, the tax arrangement between Ireland and Apple qualifies as state aid as it meets the European Union's four criteria:

- There has been an intervention by the State
- This intervention gives the benefactor a competitive advantage on a selective basis
- As a result, competition has been or may be distorted
- The intervention is likely to affect trade between the Member States

Member States cannot give tax benefits to selected companies – this is illegal under EU state aid rules. The Commission's investigation concluded that Ireland granted illegal tax benefits to Apple, which enabled it to pay substantially less tax than other businesses over many years. In fact, this selective treatment allowed Apple to pay an effective corporate tax rate of 1 per cent on its European profits in 2003 down to 0.005 per cent in 2014.

— Margrethe Vestager, "State aid: Ireland gave illegal tax benefits to Apple worth up to €13 billion", 30 August 2016.

The 30 August 2016 press briefing summarised the following findings from the main report:

1. The taxable profits of Apple Sales International and Apple Operations Europe in Ireland are determined by a tax ruling granted by Ireland in 1991, which in 2007 was replaced by a similar second tax ruling. This tax ruling was terminated when [ASI] and [AOE] changed their structures in 2015;
2. Two tax rulings issued by Ireland to Apple have substantially and artificially lowered the tax paid by Apple in Ireland since 1991;
3. These rulings endorsed a way to establish the taxable profits for two Irish companies of the Apple group [..] which did not correspond to economic reality;
4. As a result of the allocation method endorsed in the tax rulings, Apple only paid an effective corporate tax rate that declined from 1% in 2003 to 0.005% in 2014.

The 30 August 2016 press briefing made the following statements regarding the financial implications:

1. The Commission can order recovery of illegal state aid for a ten-year period preceding the Commission's first request for information in 2013;
2. Ireland must now recover the unpaid taxes in Ireland from Apple for the years 2003 to 2014 of up to €13 billion, plus interest [and normal penalties].

Following the Commission Decision, US President Donald Trump referred to Margrethe Vestager as "the tax lady."

=== Recovery order (2016) ===
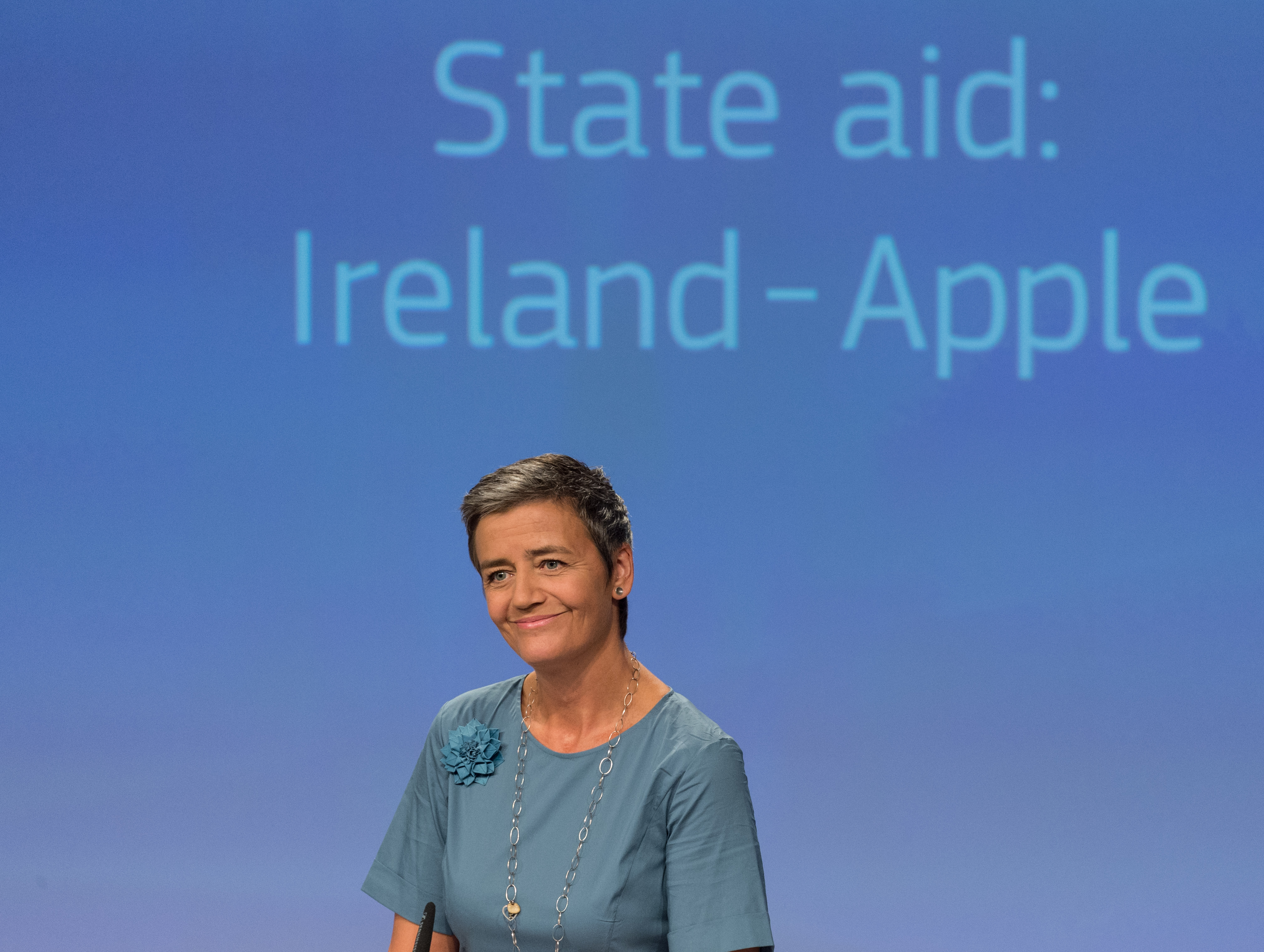
In 2016, the Commissioner for Competition Margrethe Vestager announced a recovery order of €13 billion.

The recovery order for €13 billion was an estimate subject to final ASI accounts. It covers the period 2004 to 2014 inclusive, as the commission is permitted to order a full recovery within a 10-year period from the start of an investigation. The January 2018 updated estimate of the recovery order had risen to €13.85 billion. The Commission recovery order is simply the estimated profits of, mainly, ASI applied, at the prevailing Irish corporate tax rate of 12.5% (see Table 1 above; and full EU Commission report). In addition, Apple will also owe interest penalties at the Irish Revenue penalty rate (was 8% in 2016), which would total circa €6 billion, giving a total recovery order of circa €20 billion.

A fallback position of the EU Commission's State aid case is that if ASI is not an Irish company, then it was a "stateless" company (given it was "legally" registered in Ireland), and Apple has been remitting royalty payments from EU–28 countries to a company in a jurisdiction with no EU tax treaty. Apple would, therefore, owe back-taxes to each individual EU country, from which these royalties were paid (and not to Ireland). As all other EU countries have corporation tax rates materially in excess of Ireland's 12.5% corporation tax rate, the total Apple effective taxes owned, in this scenario, would be materially in excess of €13 billion. Margrethe Vestager appealed to individual EU taxing authorities to assess this aspect of Apple's State aid case for themselves, on a case-by-case basis.

In fact, the tax treatment in Ireland enabled Apple to avoid taxation on almost all profits generated by sales of Apple products in the entire EU Single Market. This is due to Apple's decision to record all sales in Ireland rather than in the countries where the products were sold. This structure is however outside the remit of EU state aid control. If other countries were to require Apple to pay more tax on profits of the two companies over the same period under their national taxation rules, this would reduce the amount to be recovered by Ireland.

— Margrethe Vestager, "State aid: Ireland gave illegal tax benefits to Apple worth up to €13 billion", 30 August 2016.

=== Appeal (2016–2020) ===
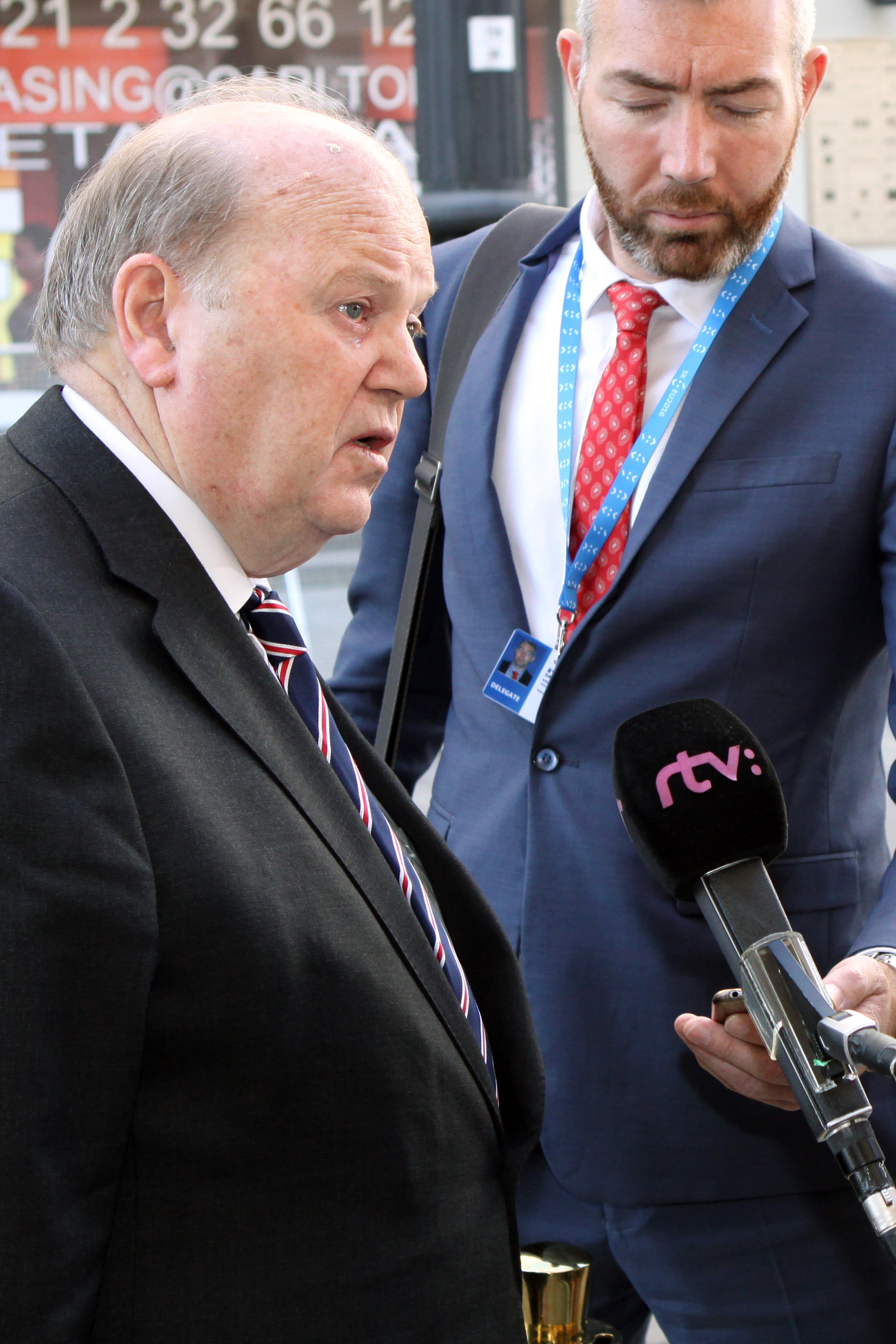
On 2 September 2016, the acting Irish Finance Minister Michael Noonan described the EU Commission ruling as an attempt to establish a "bridgehead, to bring down Ireland's 12.5% corporate tax rate".

On 7 September 2016, the Irish State secured a majority in Dáil Éireann to reject payment of the back-taxes, which including penalties could reach €20 billion, or 10% of 2014 Irish GDP. (Note: 2014 Irish GDP was Euro 195.3 billion; see Irish GDP (2009–2017).) In November 2016, in a letter to the Apple community in Europe, Tim Cook said the company would appeal. In the immediate aftermath of the commission's 29 August 2016 ruling, Ireland's finance minister Michael Noonan stated that Ireland would be appealing the decision, subject to cabinet approval. On 2 September 2016, the Irish cabinet voted to approve the appeal. The minority Fine Gael–led government also had to secure a general Dáil Éireann vote on the matter, which it did on 7 September, by a majority of 93 to 36, securing the support of the other main Irish political party, Fianna Fáil. In November 2016, the Irish government also formally notified the EU Commission it would appeal and reject any claim to the €13 billion "windfall".

The appeal will firstly be heard in the EU's General Court, with any further appeal being taken to the EU's highest court; the European Court of Justice.

In August 2018, it was reported that the appeal would begin before the end of 2018, but could take over 5 years, and that Apple had begun to lodge the €13 billion into an escrow account during Q2 2018. On 18 September 2018, it was reported that Apple had lodged the €13 billion, plus another €1.3 billion, (Note: The extra €1.3 billion has been reported as being interest, however, interest is not payable when there is an appeal; it is more likely that €14.3 billion is the final total fine, excluding interest, as a result of the final audited ASI accounts for 2013 and 2014 being filed.) into the Irish State's escrow account. In October 2018, the commission announced that it would drop its legal action against Ireland for failure to recover the amount owed by the deadline laid down in the Commission decision (the deadline was 3 January 2017).

In May 2019, the Irish Public Accounts Committee was told by officials from the Department of Finance that defending the Apple case (i.e. to prevent the payment of the fine to Ireland), had cost the Irish state €7.1 million in mostly legal fees, and that the final case may take a decade to reach a final verdict.

On 15 July 2020, the European General Court (EGC) ruled that the Commission "did not succeed in showing to the requisite legal standard" that Apple had received tax advantages from Ireland, and ruled in favour of Apple. The EGC noted that their ruling can be appealed to the Court of Justice of the European Union, which could take several more years; Apple funds would remain in escrow until such an appeal was concluded.

In September 2020, the European Commission appealed against the court ruling by the European General Court that said Apple did not have to pay €13 billion because the Commission considered that in its judgment the General Court has made a number of errors of law.

=== Court of Justice final ruling (2024) ===
Before the final ruling, in November 2023, the advocate general Giovanni Pitruzzella in his role of top adviser to the European Court of Justice, recommended that the European Court of Justice annuls the decision of the lower European General Court. This is because the lower court did not correctly assess "the substance and consequences of certain methodological errors that, according to the Commission decision, vitiated the tax rulings", according to Pitruzzella.

On 10 September 2024 the European Court of Justice annulled the General Court ruling, confirming the European Commission findings and mandating the €13 billion payment from Apple to the Irish treasury. The Court of Justice stated: "[ECJ] gives final judgment in the matter and confirms the European Commission’s 2016 decision: Ireland granted Apple unlawful aid which Ireland is required to recover". The European Commission found that corporate tax rates as low as 0.005% paid by the tech giant represented an unlawful subsidy, specifically because other companies were not permitted to obtain the same tax arrangements. As a consequence Apple must pay €13 billion, excluding interest, to the Irish Treasury. Margrethe Vestager announced that she "cried" when hearing that final judgement was favourable to the European Commission, stating that "It's very important to show European taxpayers that, once in a while, tax justice can be done."

== Further controversy ==
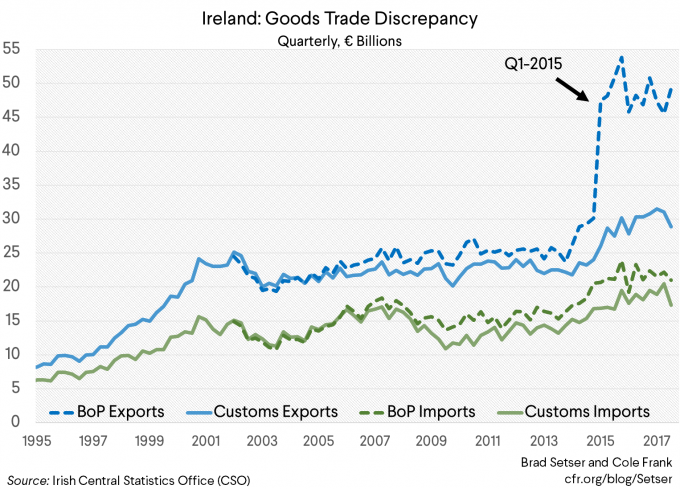
Ireland: Apple's Q1 2015 restructuring. Brad Setser & Cole Frank (Council on Foreign Relations)

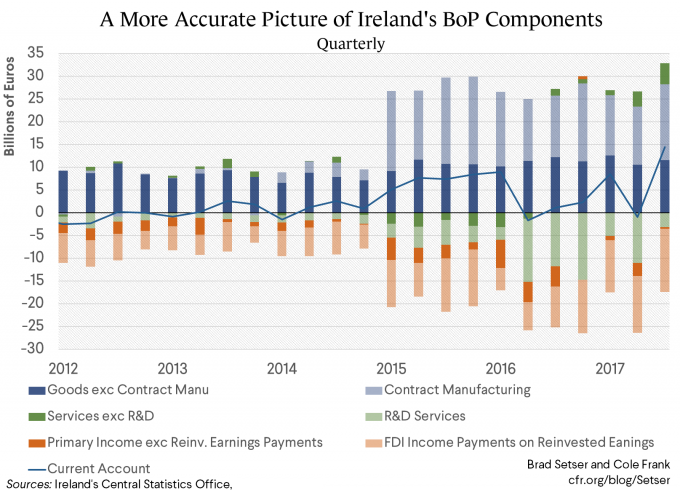
Ireland: Apple's Q1 2015 IP distortion of Ireland's balance of payments. Brad Setser & Cole Frank (Council on Foreign Relations)

The EU Commission's findings cover the period from 2004 to end 2014, and its report notes that Apple had informed it at the start of 2015 that the controversial hybrid–Double Irish BEPS tool, ASI, had been closed down; which enabled the commission to complete its State aid report, and finalise the recovery order of €13 billion.

In January 2018, economist Seamus Coffey, Chairman of the State's Irish Fiscal Advisory Council, and author of the State's 2017 Review of Ireland's Corporation Tax Code, showed Apple restructured ASI into another Irish IP–based BEPS tool, the Capital Allowances for Intangible Assets ("CAIA"), in Q1 2015.

It is specifically prohibited under Ireland's own corporation tax code (Section 291A(c) of the Irish Taxes and Consolation Act 1997) to use the CAIA BEPS scheme for reasons that are not "commercial bona fide reasons" and in particular for schemes where the main purpose is "the avoidance of, or reduction in, liability to tax". Given that the CAIA scheme is a deliberate IP–based BEPS tool, it is Ireland tripping over itself trying to maintain OECD-compliance.

The November 2017 Paradise Papers leaks revealed that Apple and its lawyers, Applebys, were looking for a replacement for the ASI structure in 2014. They considered a number of tax havens (especially Jersey). Some of the disclosed documents left little doubt as to the key drivers of Apple's decision making.

If the Irish Revenue waived Section 291A(c) for Apple's 2015 restructuring, it could result in a further EU Commission State Aid investigation.

In January 2018, in a series of articles in The Sunday Business Post, Mr Coffey estimated that since the 2015 restructuring, Apple has avoided Irish corporate taxes totalling circa at €2.5–3 bn per annum (at the 12.5% rate). Mr Coffey calculated the potential second EU Apple State aid recovery order for the 2015–2018 (inclusive) period, would therefore reach circa €10bn, excluding any interest penalties.

The Irish financial media further noted that the then Finance Minister Michael Noonan, had increased the tax relief threshold for the Irish CAIA scheme from 80% to 100% in the 2015 budget (i.e. reduce the effective Irish corporate tax rate from 2.5% to 0%). This was changed back in the subsequent 2017 budget by Finance Minister Paschal Donohoe, however firms which had started their Irish CAIA scheme in 2015 (like Apple), were allowed to stay at the 100% relief level for the duration of their scheme, which can, under certain conditions, be extended indefinitely.

In November 2017, it was reported that the EU Commission had already asked for details on Apple's Irish structure post its January 2015 ruling.

In February 2019, Sinn Féin MEP Matt Carthy discussed Apple's use of the CAIA Irish BEPS tool with Margrethe Vestager.

At a tax conference in 2023, Helena Malikova put forward the idea that Ireland and other States had decided not to gather relevant information on tax planning schemes, including on the Apple tax planning scheme. Malikova described this approach to tax matters as a sovereign "right not to know". Without such information on the activities of Irish companies outside of Ireland, it is difficult to find a basis on which to challenge corporations on their Irish tax base.

Speaking at the same conference, judge Vesna Tomljenović, who presided over the European General Court decision of 2020 in the Apple case, criticized the use of transfer pricing rules as a tool for tax planning, including in the case of Apple.

== Irish position ==
=== Decision by Ireland to appeal EU's recovery order ===
After 29 August 2016 ruling, the EU Commission followed up on 31 August to counter statements from the Irish Government that Ireland would have to use the proceeds of any Apple recovery to pay down public sector debt (in line with agreed EU budgetary rules), and to clarify that Ireland could allocate the money in whichever way the Irish Government lawfully saw fit. Regardless however, on 7 September, the Irish minority Government, with material opposition support, rejected the EU Commission's ruling on Apple, and the payment of €13 billion, plus penalties, to the Irish State.

=== Irish media ===
The role of the Irish media in "framing" the debate around the ethical issues of helping global multinational corporations avoid taxes has been noted. In April 2019, academic research found that "Irish respondents exposed to treatments questioning the morality and fairness of Ireland's facilitation of Apple tax avoidance are more likely to acknowledge the negative impact on Ireland's EU neighbours".

== Timeline ==
- 1980 – Apple establishes production facilities in Cork, Ireland.
- 1991 – Irish State agreed the first tax deal with Apple Inc (one of the two rulings cited by the EU Commission).
- 2007 – Original 1991 tax agreement is re-negotiated with Irish State (the second ruling cited by the EU Commission).
- 2013 – US Senate subcommittee examines offshore profit shifting and tax avoidance by Apple.
- 2014 – European Commission opens case against Apple in Ireland.
- 2015 – Apple re-structures its two Irish subsidiaries.
- 2016 – European Commission release findings announcing Apple has undue tax benefits owed to Ireland (up to end 2014)
- 2016 – Both Apple and Ireland announce a decision to appeal the ruling.
- 2017 – European Commission asks for details of Apple's 2015 re-structuring in Ireland
- 2018 – Apple sets aside in an escrow account the full €13 billion recovery order (no interest penalty yet) to Ireland (subject to appeal).
- 2020 – Apple wins its appeal at the European General Court (ECG).
- 2020 – The EU Commission announce they intend to appeal the ECG's decision at the CJEU.
- 2023 – Adviser to the European Court of Justice recommends to annul the 2020 decision of the lower European General Court.
- 2024 – ECJ strikes General Court decision and subsequently confirms European Commission ruling and Apple's €13 billion payment to Ireland.

== See also ==
- Conduit and Sink OFCs analysis of tax havens
- Corporation tax in the Republic of Ireland
- Criticism of Apple Inc.
- Ireland as a tax haven
- Matheson (law firm) Ireland's largest US tax advisor
- Modified gross national income replaced Irish GDP/GNP
- Panama as a tax haven
- Qualifying investor alternative investment fund (QIAIF) Irish tax-free vehicles
- Section 110 SPV Debt-based BEPS tool
- Single malt arrangement IP-based BEPS tool
- United States as a tax haven
- Dhammika Dharmapala, leader in academic research on tax havens
- James R. Hines Jr., leader in academic research on tax havens
- Feargal O'Rourke architect of Ireland's BEPS tools
- Gabriel Zucman, leader in academic research on tax havens
