= Statute of the Court of Justice of the European Union =

Law dictating policies and procedures of CJEU

The Statute of the Court of Justice of the European Union (C 83/210) contains the main EU law rules on how the Court of Justice of the European Union should function. Founded in 1951, The CJEU sits in Luxembourg, and it operates in two sections: The European Court of Justice (ECJ) and the General Court (GC). A direct component of the EU, the five main goals of the CJEU are:

1. Interpret the law
2. Enforce the law
3. Annul legal acts
4. Ensure that the EU takes action
5. Sanction EU institutions

The ECJ and the GC deal with separate jurisdictions that together are responsible for upholding the legal framework set out in the Treaty on the Functioning of the European Union (TFEU).

== Branches of the CJEU ==
=== The European Court of Justice ===
The ECJ is the senior court of the CJEU, and it consists of 27 judges, one from each member state, and 11 Advocates General. The Advocates General have the same status as the other judges, but they are also responsible for submitting an independent opinion of the case to the judge panel before they make their decision. The decision of the Advocate General is not binding, but it is nevertheless influential and the judges often follow their opinion. Germany, Italy, Spain, Poland, and France have permanent seats in the council for Advocates General. The other six come from rotating through the most populated nations in the EU at the time. The ECJ mostly deals with requests for rulings from national courts, and they serve as the senior appellate court of the EU. It receives cases either through an appeal or because the court feels that their decision invalidates EU Law. As the specialty court on EU Law, the ECJ focuses on maintaining the procedures outlined in the TFEU. Occasionally, it will also give opinions on annulment cases.

=== The General Court ===
The GC sits two judges per member state, or 54 total. Because of its larger size, reforms have given it a broader scope. The GC accepts cases dealing with competition law, agriculture, trademarks, state aid, and most annulment actions brought by individuals, companies, or occasionally member states. As outlined in the statute, the GC is subject to the same rules of procedure as the ECJ. Article 49 states that, if necessary, a GC judge can fulfill the responsibilities of an Advocate General to the GC. Companies and individuals can submit their case directly to the GC, regardless of whether or not the case has been heard before.

== Articles of the Statute ==
The Statute of the Court of Justice of the European Union contains the legal rules governing the CJEU. It consists of 64 articles and an annex, each of which clearly delineate the rights and limitations of judges, applicants, lawyers, and witnesses, as well as explaining the organizational structure of the court. The concept of the statute as it exists now was developed in the Treaty of Lisbon, signed in 2009. The statute has been amended several times in the past in order to best mirror the evolving structure of the EU. Article 281 in the TFEU establishes the need for a statute for the CJEU. They write that the statute will guide the courts and that it will be amended by the European Parliament and Council when necessary. The main body of the statute is divided into six titles: Judges and Advocates General (Articles 2-8), Organization of the Courts (Articles 9-18), Procedure of the Court of Justice (Articles 19-46), General Court (Articles 47-62b), Specialized Courts (Article 62c), and Final Provisions (Articles 63-64). The annex contains information about the Civil Service Tribunal (CST), a now defunct specialized court.

=== Article 1 ===
Article 1 of the statute explains that it should function in accordance with all other existing treaties and that the statute hopes to extend EU law into the judicial sector.

=== Judges and Advocates General ===
The first title outlines the rights, rules, and responsibilities for judges in the CJEU. It explains the circumstances under which a judge can be fired in Article 6, and it explains the judges’ right to legal immunity while in office in Article 3. Article 8 clarifies that all rules concerning the judges also apply to the Advocate General.

=== Organization of the Court of Justice ===
The Organization of the Courts detailed in section 2 explains the rules of succession in the court, the role of the registrar, and other important operational details. Article 9 explains the term length of judges: they will all sit for 6 years, but on offset election cycles. Half of the judges will be replaced every 3 years. The president of the Court of Justice is elected every 3 years, and they can be reelected once. Importantly, Article 16 in this title also explains the size and organization of the courts. Each chamber will have three or five judges ruling in it, except for the Grand Chamber, which has 15 judges, and the Full Court, which has every sitting judge. Recently, the GC has had mostly three-person judge panels. Articles 10 and 11 explain the role and importance of a registrar to the functioning of the CJEU. This section also stipulates that all members of the court must reside full-time in Luxembourg, where the court is.

=== Procedure before the Court of Justice ===
Articles 19-46 explain in detail the procedure of the ECJ, one of the courts of the CJEU. They outline the rules for legal representation, witnesses and experts, and the appeal process that a case must go through to reach the ECJ. Article 20 explains the structure of a case. Each case must have a written and oral portion. The written portion is submitted to the judges ahead of time, and the oral portion is delivered in court. Although Article 59 occasionally dismisses the oral section in an appeal to the ECJ from the GC, this circumstance is exceedingly rare. Articles 22 and 23 explain the intersection of this statute to the statutes of Euratom and TFEU. Article 18 of the Euratom treaty says that the CJEU must recommend an Arbitration Committee to them, so the statute outlines the legal structure and issues that may arise from this process. The TFEU grants the CJEU the right to give “preliminary rulings concerning: (a) the interpretation of the Treaties; (b) the validity and interpretation of acts of the institutions, bodies, offices or agencies of the Union.” Article 23 of the statute gives the protocol for dealing with this responsibility from the treaty. This section gives a long list of requirements and guidelines for witnesses, including punishments for lying under oath or not showing up to court. Articles 35-37 explain the judgment process. Every judgment is made in secret and is released in an official statement with reasoning. Only the registrar and the president of the court will sign the decision, meaning that there is no knowledge of how each judge voted. Additionally, a case can only be retried in this court if there has been a discovery of a new piece of evidence that drastically changes the fact pattern of the case.

=== General Court ===
After elucidating the procedure for the ECJ, the statute then clarifies the distinctions between the ECJ and the GC. Although neither court is officially “above” the other, they do deal with different jurisdictions that require slightly different procedures. Articles 47-62b also outline the interactions between the GC and the ECJ. Articles 47 and 53 state that the GC is subject to all other articles in the statute, meaning that the judges must follow all rules on witnesses, succession, and registrars that have been previously outlined. In the GC, the president also serves a three-year term, but they can only be reelected once. Article 54 states that the two courts can refer cases between them if they think the other court is better suited to address it. Articles 56-62 say that a case can be appealed to the ECJ from the GC in extreme circumstances, and that the ECJ has the legal power to review the decision of the GC if they believe that the decision could drastically alter the law and the culture of the EU. By the statute, the ECJ has the power to overturn a decision made in the GC, however this happens rarely.

=== Specialized Courts ===
The Specialized Courts title only contains article 62c, which states that any information about specialized courts must be contained in the annex. As the annex exists now, it only contains old articles from the CST that still have some legal bearing.

=== Final Provisions ===
Articles 63 and 64 outline the final provisions on the statute of the CJEU. Article 63 says that the Rules of Procedure of the Court of Justice are responsible for supplementing the statute with extra executive details. Article 64 explains that the amendment process for the statute requires unanimous support from the Council of Europe.

== Reforms of the Statute ==
=== March 2011 ===
When, at the end of 2010, the GC reported 1300 pending cases, they requested to add twelve additional judges to their court. The court had experienced a mass increase in cases due to a transfer of jurisdiction from the ECJ. This reform also created a new intellectual property specialized court.

=== 16 December 2015 ===
At the end of 2015, the GC finally received more judges. The reform clarified that the court would gradually double the amount of judges in three phases, starting on 25 December 2015 and ending 1 September 2019. This process would result in each member state having two judges, which reflects the court's current state.

=== 31 August 2016 ===
The EU passed Regulation 2016/1192, which broadened GC jurisdiction to cover staff disputes between the EU and its employees, as well as laying down the procedure for the transition. The reform also got rid of the CST and altered the annex of the statute to reflect this transition.

=== 28 March 2018 ===
The ECJ attempted to narrow its scope in 2018 by proposing the transfer of jurisdiction over cases regarding infringement rights to the GC, but the application was postponed until December 2020 because it was deemed unnecessary.

=== 1 May 2019 ===
In the spring of 2019, the court passed Regulation 2019/629, which transferred back to the ECJ decisions surrounding annulment rights by member states, since these decisions could deal with financial sanctions on member states, a matter under ECJ jurisdiction. Therefore, instead of the 2018 attempt passing, the ECJ ended up with slightly more responsibility. This Regulation also begins to establish a method for the ECJ to filter which cases go to which court. It concludes that appeals to the GC only matter if their impact could directly impede the unity of Europe's laws.

=== 19 March 2024 ===
This most recent reform changes Article 50, inserts 50b, and amends 58a in the statute to broaden the GC's role. Due to an influx of cases at the ECJ, they have expanded the size and jurisdiction of the GC. Previous reforms, specifically the 2011 and 2015 ones, expanded the size of the GC and gave them power to handle a higher caseload. Taking advantage of this, the new reform further expands the scope of the GC to make the CJEU more efficient. The GC is bigger and has the capacity to deal with a higher caseload than the ECJ.

The reform aims to streamline CJEU procedure. The ECJ will still retain control over cases dealing with the TFEU or the Charter on Fundamental Rights. In expanding the GC, they have further codified Regulation 2019/629 into this reform, bringing the GC up in its judicial powers. This reform also seeks to make the court more transparent, stipulating that it will publish any submissions to the court in a timely manner. The President of the GC Marc van der Woude said that in the short term, they are prioritizing training younger judges and building up the general expertise so that the court can develop quickly. The reform should mitigate any procedural differences between the GC and the ECJ.

More specifically, the new reform explains the legal procedure for cases involving:

- Value added tax
- Excise duties
- Customs code and tariff
- Passengers’ rights, compensation and assistance
- Greenhouse gas emissions

== Summary of the Statute ==
Article Number	Summary
1	The statute should function in accordance with other treaties, extending their provisions into the legal sector.
Judges and Advocates General
2	All judges must, while swearing into the court, promise to act objectively and preserve the secrecy of the court.
3	Judges are immune from any legal proceedings upon swearing in. However, if a judge is accused, their immunity is waived and they are tried by another highly ranking court.
4	Judges cannot hold another political office.
5	Apart from death or the natural expiration of their term, a judge ends their term by resigning.
6	Judges can be expelled from court if they "no longer fulfill the requisite conditions or meet the obligations arising from [their] office." Even then, there must be a unanimous decision from all the judges of the ECJ.
7	A judge who replaces another judge will be appointed for the remainder of their predecessor's term.
8	Articles 2-7 also apply to the Advocate General.
Organization of the Courts
9 9a.	Half of the judges are replaced every 3 years, making each judge have a 6-year term. The court elects the president and the vice-president from their number every 3 years
10	Registrars must swear to be impartial and secretive.
11	Judges are responsible for arranging a replacement for the registrar if they are unable to attend a proceeding.
12	There shall be hired officials who will help the court function.
13	If necessary, the court can require the EU to hire Assistant Rapporteurs to aid official judges.
14	All judges, Advocates General, and the registrar must reside where the CJEU is.
15	The court shall always be in session. Any breaks are established after considering the requirements of the court.
16	Chambers will have either 3 or 5 judges, with one elected president amongst them. The Grand Chamber will have 15 judges and will be presided over by the president of the court. There are also details about when a case should be taken to the Full Court or Grand Chamber.
17	There must be an uneven number of judges in each court, and there are specific number thresholds to make decisions in the Full Court and Grand Chamber valid.
18	Judges are exempt from judging cases in certain circumstances.
Procedure before the Court of Justice
19	Member states and institutions are represented by agents who can be advised by lawyers. Other parties must have lawyers.
20	Cases must contain a written and oral portion.
21	Applications for a hearing must be written to the registrar and contain certain information.
22	Cases appealed from the European Atomic Energy Community (Euratom) should be tried by the ECJ
23 23a	Article 23 gives the protocol for dealing with Article 267 of the TFEU, which reads that the ECJ can make preliminary decisions on cases regarding EU Law. There is an accelerated procedure for specific cases dealing with freedom, security, and justice.
24	Both parties must supply all requested documents.
25	Anyone trusted by the court can give an expert opinion.
26	Witnesses are subject to the Rules of Procedure.
27	Any witnesses who do not appear at court shall incur a fine.
28	Witnesses and experts must testify under oath.
29	If necessary, the court can question witnesses in their home.
30	If suspected of lying under oath, the accused will be tried by the ECJ.
31	Hearings are public.
32	Courts can examine experts, witnesses, and parties.
33	Each hearing must have minutes.
34	Each hearing must have a case list.
35	All ECJ deliberations are secret.
36	Judgments will be published anonymously with resoning.
37	Judgments are signed by the president and the registrar.
38	The ECJ will decide pecuniary damages.
39	The president has the power to defer punishment.
40	Member states and institutions of the EU can intervene before the court.
41	If the defending party does not issue a defense upon being summoned, the court will automatically issue a judgment.
42	Anyone tried can request third-party judgment of their trial.
43	The ECJ will clarify meaning or scope when necessary.
44	Revision of an ECJ decision within the court can only occur if a discovery has been made that drastically alters the fact pattern of the case.
45	The Rules of Procedure determine whether or not an extension of a time limit can be made for people who reside physically far away.
46	After a five-year period, applications dealing with non-contractual liability are barred, but some exceptions exist under Articles 263 and 265 of the TFEU.
General Court
47	The GC must abide by all other articles in the statute.
48	As of 1 September 2019, the GC consists of two judges per member state.
49	Members of the GC might be called upon to act as an Advocate General.
50 50a	Each chamber of the GC should have three or five judges, with one presiding over them. Presidents may be reelected once. the GC is the first court for any case between the EU and one of its employees, and they may try to reach a settlement at any time in these proceedings.
51	Expanding upon 256(1) of the TFEU, it outlines when the courts have jurisdiction.
52	The president of the ECJ and the president of the GC will determine the roles of the employees of the court.
53	The GC has the same procedure as the ECJ and must abide by articles 19-46.
54	The ECJ and the GC can refer cases to each other if they think the other court is better suited.
55	The registrar must notify all parties and member states involved, as well as any related bodies of the EU.
56	It is possible to appeal to the ECJ from the GC, but the member states and institutions can only do so if the policy directly affects them.
57	Anyone whose application to the general court was dismissed can appeal and send it to the ECJ instead.
58 58a	An appeal to the ECJ must condemn the GC for lack of competence, breach in procedure, or infringement on EU Law 58a details when decisions can be appealed. Certain bodies of the EU cannot be appealed from.
59	Appeals before the ECJ from the GC must have a written and oral section, but the oral section can occasionally be dismissed if they have already heard the opinions of the parties.
60	Except for cases regarding Articles 278 and 279 of the TFEU and Article 157 of Euratom, the appeals do not have a suspensory effect.
61	The ECJ has the power to overturn decisions made in the GC. They can either issue their own binding decision, or they can return the case to the GC. If they choose to return it, the GC must adjudicate based on the new points of law set forth by the ECJ.
62 62a 62b	The Advocate General has the power to make the ECJ review decisions of the GC if the decision could have a serious impact on the cohesion of EU Law. The ECJ considers this an urgent procedure and would accelerate it. The ECJ can either coincide or disagree with the GC, but they have the final say.
Specialized Courts
62c	Any separate provisions for a specialized court will be added to the annex of the statute.
Final Provisions
63	The Rules of Procedure should supplement the Statute.
64	Amendments can only be codified with the unanimous support of the European Council.

== Related Legal Documents ==
=== Rules of Procedure of the Court of Justice ===
The Rules of Procedure of the Court of Justice of the European Union outline extra parameters not stated in the statute. They provide examples of implementation of specific instances in the court that provide clarity for the statute.

=== Treaty on the Functioning of the European Union (TFEU) ===
The TFEU has certain provisions that relate to the statute of the Court of Justice. Specifically, Articles 251-256, 263-267, 270, 278, 279, and 299 delineate the specific requirements of the statute.

=== European Atomic Energy Community (Euratom) ===
The European Atomic Energy Community (Euratom) develops and promotes nuclear energy technology throughout Europe. Article 18 entrusts the CJEU with nominating people for an Arbitration Committee to help regulate the functions of the community. Articles 83, 157, and 164 of the Euratom Treaty recognize that the CJEU can make decisions that do not agree with Euratom, and that they can suspend contested Euratom acts.

== See also ==
- EU law
- Court of Justice of the European Union
- Treaty on the Functioning of the European Union
- European Court of Justice
- General Court
