= Heikki Kanninen =

Finnish judge (born 1951)

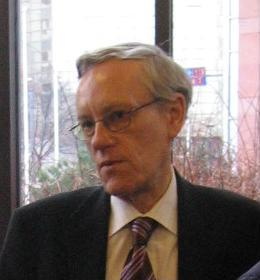
- Kanninen in 2007

Vice President of the General Court
- In office 17 September 2013 – 19 September 2016
- Succeeded by: Marc van der Woude

Judge of the General Court
- In office 2009–2022
- Preceded by: Virpi Tiili

Personal details
- Born: Heikki Juhani Kanninen; 11 January 1952 (age 74) Helsinki, Finland

Heikki Juhani Kanninen (born 11 January 1951) is a Finnish jurist. He is a former judge of the Finnish Supreme Administrative Court, EU Civil Service Tribunal and EU General Court.

== Biography ==
Kanninen was born in Helsinki on 11 January 1951.

Kanninen graduated in economics in 1976, Bachelor of Law in 1978 and Licentiate of Law in 1988.

From 1986 to 2000, Kanninen worked in the Ministry of Justice as a legislative adviser, but was nevertheless the deputy head of the EFTA Court's office from 1993 to 1995, and the legal assistant at the European Court of Justice from 1995 to 1998.

He was a member of the asylum board from 1991 to 1996.

Kanninen served as vice-chairman of the Development Committee of the Judiciary from 2001 to 2003. Since 2005, he was on leave from his position while working in Luxembourg as a judge of the Civil Service Tribunal.

On 25 February 2009, Kanninen was appointed as a judge of the Court of First Instance of the European Communities (later known as the General Court), succeeding Virpi Tiili. From the beginning of September 2010, Kanninen was appointed for a new six-year term.

He was the Vice President of the General Court from 2013 to 2016.

== Family ==
He is the son of Lieutenant General Ermei Kanninen.
