= Ian Forrester =

European Court of Justice judge

Sir Ian Forrester KC

Judge in the General Court of the European Union
- In office 2015–2020
- Preceded by: Nicholas James Forwood

Personal details
- Born: 1945 (age 80–81)
- Occupation: Judge
- Profession: Barrister
- Website: ianstewartforrester.com

Sir Ian Stewart Forrester KC (born 1945) is a former judge in the General Court of the Court of Justice of the European Union (CJEU). He served from 7 October 2015 to 31 January 2020. He was knighted in the 2026 New Year Honours list for services to International Law.

== Education ==
Ian Forrester studied at the University of Glasgow, Scotland, between 1962 and 1967 and graduated with a Master of Arts in History and English Literature and a Bachelor of Laws. Later, in 1969, he graduated with a Master of Civil Law from Tulane University, Louisiana, New Orleans.

== Career ==
Prior to being appointed to the General Court, he practiced as a barrister in Scotland (with Maclay, Murray & Spens), and New York (with Davis Polk & Wardwell) until 1972, following which he appeared before the Court of Justice of the European Union in Brussels and the European Court of Human Rights in Strasbourg. He subsequently established Forrester & Norall, which merged with White & Case in 1997. In 2015, he established a pro bono programme at White & Case.

Selected cases

Ian Forrester appeared before the court in the following cases:

- BBC et al. v Commission (Case T-70/89)
- Tillack v Belgium (Case 20477/05)
