= Suzanne Kingston =

Irish judge and academic

The Hon. Miss. Justice Suzanne Kingston

Judge of the General Court of the European Union
- Incumbent
- Assumed office 13 January 2022
- Nominated by: Government of Ireland
- Appointed by: European Council

Personal details
- Born: Suzanne Elizabeth Joy Kingston; 12 December 1977 (age 48) Dublin, Ireland
- Education: University of Oxford; Leiden University

Suzanne Elizabeth Joy Kingston (born 12 December 1977) is an Irish judge who has served as a Judge of the General Court of the European Union since January 2022. She was previously a professor of law at University College Dublin. She has also practised as a barrister.

== Early life ==
Kingston was born in Dublin in 1977. She obtained a degree in law from the University of Oxford, graduating from University College, Oxford in 1997 from where she obtained a college prize in law. She studied for an LLM degree and PhD at Leiden University. She completed her PhD thesis in 2009 on the topic The Role of Environmental Protection in EC Competition Law and Policy.

== Legal career ==
She was called to the Bar of England and Wales in 1999 at Gray's Inn and the Irish Bar in 2007. She became a senior counsel in Ireland in 2020.

Between 2001 and 2002, she worked at the Directorate-General for Competition of the European Commission, before joining the Brussels office of Cleary Gottlieb Steen & Hamilton in 2002. She then worked in Luxembourg as référendaire to Advocate General Ad Geelhoed between 2004 and 2006.

She appeared on behalf of Ireland in Ireland v Commission. In 2021, she acted for the state in Green Party TD Patrick Costello's constitutional challenge regarding the Comprehensive Economic and Trade Agreement. She has represented the Irish state in cases involving environmental law, tax law, planning law and constitutional law. She has also appeared in the EFTA Court.

== Academic career ==
She was an affiliated lecturer at the University of Cambridge between 2006 and 2007, before being appointed lecturer at University College Dublin in 2007. She was later appointed professor. She wrote several books on European Union law, including European Environmental Law and Greening EU Competition Law and Policy. She was the principal investigator of a project with €1.5 million of funding from the European Research Council on compliance with EU environmental law.

== Judicial career ==
Kingston was nominated by the Irish government to fill an Irish vacancy on the General Court prompted by Judge Anthony Collins becoming an advocate general. She was appointed in December 2021 to serve from January 2022 until August 2025. She continues to teach at UCD.
