= José Martín y Pérez de Nanclares =

Spanish jurist

José Martín y Pérez de Nanclares (Vitoria, 1965) is a Spanish jurist. Currently, he is a judge of the General Court of the European Union, one of the two constituent courts of the Luxembourg Court, as well as a professor of Public International Law and International Relations at the University of Salamanca. He is also an associate member of the Hispano-Luso-American Institute of International Law. From 2012 to 2018, he was head of the International Legal Office of the Spanish Ministry of Foreign Affairs, in charge of advising the General State Administration in all matters of international law. After briefly returning to teaching, he became director of the cabinet of the President of the Spanish Council of State, before his appointment for European judiciary. He was also a member of the Permanent Court of Arbitration (2018-2019).

== Early life and education ==
In 1988, Martín y Pérez de Nanclares graduated in Law from the University of Salamanca. He did postgraduate studies in German Constitutional Law at the University of Cologne (1989). He obtained the Zertifikat über Europäische Studien (1990) and graduated from a Master in European Law (1991). In 1994, he obtained a PhD in Law from the University of Saarbrücken, in Germany. He also holds a Doctor of Law of the University of Salamanca.

== Career ==
In 2001, Martín y Pérez de Nanclares became a full professor at the University of La Rioja, where he was a holder of the Chair of Public International Law and of the Jean Monnet Chair of EU Law, until 2009. In that institution, he also served as Vice-Rector for Research, from 1996 to 2000, and for International Relations, from 2004 to 2008. In 2009, he became a full professor at the University of Salamanca, where he was also Director of its European Documentation Centre.

From 2012 to 2018, Martín y Pérez de Nanclares was head of the International Legal Office of the Spanish Ministry of Foreign Affairs, a period of special activity in which this office developed a very active work in the elaboration of three laws that updated the Spanish legislation on international law: the Law on Foreign Service, the Law on Treaties and other International Agreements, and the Law on privileges and immunities of foreign States. During that period, he was also a member of the Spanish Delegation at several meetings of the European Union, Council of Europe, United Nations (6th Committee), States Parties Assembly of the International Criminal Court, etc. He also served as counsel advocate for Spain before the International Tribunal for the Law of the Sea.

In September 2019, Martín y Pérez de Nanclares became one of the two Spanish judges of the General Court of the European Union. His current term will end on August 31, 2025.

Martín y Pérez de Nanclares is the author of several books on European issues and Community Law. He is also the author of more than 100 scientific publications and contributions to collective works, published in Spanish, English, French or German. In 2009, he was given an honorary doctorate from the National University of Piura, in Peru. In 2016, he was granted the 'Cruz de San Raimundo de Peñafort'.

== Other activities ==
- Max Planck Institute for Comparative Public Law and International Law, Member of the Scientific Advisory Board
