= René Barents =

Dutch European Union law scholar

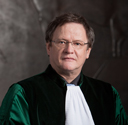

Judge
- In office 18 july 2011 – 1 September 2022

Personal details
- Born: 31-12-1951 Rotterdam
- Education: Erasmus University Rotterdam, Utrecht University

René Barents (born 31 December 1951) is a Dutch European Union law scholar. He has been a judge at the General Court since 6 october 2011. He previously served as a judge on the European Union Civil Service Tribunal from 2011 until 2016

Barents has worked for the European Union justice system since the early 1980s, and he has been a professor of European Union law at Maastricht University since 1989.

== Career ==
Barents was born on 31 December 1951 in Rotterdam. In Rotterdam he studied law with a focus on economics at the Erasmus University where he graduated in 1973. Afterwards Barents became a researcher and lecturer in European and economic law at the Europe Institute of Utrecht University. From 1979 to 1981 he held a similar lecturer position at Leiden University. In 1981 he also obtained his Master of Laws degree from Utrecht University. In the same year Barents started working for the Court of Justice of the European Union. He served as legal secretary until 1986 and then for another year as Head of the Employee Rights Unit. Between 1987 and 1991 he worked for the legal service of the European Commission.

From 1991 to 2000 Barents was a legal secretary at the European Court of Justice. In that latter year he started working for the Research and Documentation Directorate of the Court of Justice of the European Union. In 2009 he became director, he would keep this position until his appointment as judge of the European Union Civil Service Tribunal, which became effective on 6 October 2011. The Civil Service Tribunal was dissolved, ending Barents's his service there on 31 August 2016. He became a judge on the General Court on 19 September 2016. His original term at the Civil Service Tribunal was scheduled to end on 30 September 2017.

Barents started working as professor of European Union law at Maastricht University in 1989, he became an honorary professor in 2003. In 2007 Barents criticized the decision of the Dutch Council of State to advise the Dutch government not to hold a referendum on the Treaty of Lisbon, calling it a political rather than a legal advice. Barents has held the position that European Union law is autonomous from that of the member states of the Union.

Barents became a corresponding member of the Royal Netherlands Academy of Arts and Sciences in 1995.
