= Marko Bošnjak (judge) =

Slovenian judge (born 1974)

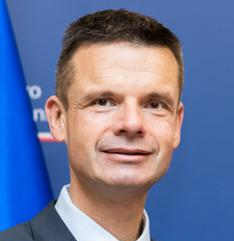
- Bošnjak in 2024

President of the European Court of Human Rights
- In office 2 July 2024 – 29 May 2025
- Preceded by: Síofra O'Leary
- Succeeded by: Mattias Guyomar

Personal details
- Born: 12 March 1974 (age 52) Ljubljana, Slovenia
- Spouse: Petra Stanonik Bošnjak
- Education: University of Ljubljana

Marko Bošnjak (born 12 March 1974) is a Slovenian jurist, judge, attorney, and academic. He worked as a researcher and lecturer before becoming an attorney and subsequently a judge. Bošnjak served as a judge at the European Court of Human Rights between May 2016 and May 2025. For the last 11 months of his term, he was the president of the court. In June 2025, he was appointed as a judge at the European Court of Justice.

== Early life and education ==
Bošnjak was born in Ljubljana on 12 March 1974. He graduated from the Faculty of Law at the University of Ljubljana in 1999, obtaining his law degree. In 1999 and 2002, he obtained his master’s degree and the doctoral title in law, respectively, both at that same university. His doctoral dissertation was titled “The Development of Modern Medicine and Criminal Law". He passed the state judicial exam in 2001 with the highest commendations.

== Career ==
=== Academic career ===
Bošnjak began his academic career in 1996 as a research assistant, then in 2002 continued on as a research fellow until 2006, when he became a senior research fellow at the Institute of Criminology at the Faculty of Law at the University of Ljubljana until 2008. While a senior research fellow, he also presided over its scientific council. From 2005 to 2015, he was assistant professor for Criminal Law and Criminology at the Faculty of Law at the University of Ljubljana. He also lectured at the Faculty of Social Sciences from 2006 to 2012. Since then, he has been associate professor of Criminal Law at the European Law Faculty in Nova Gorica, where he also acted as the Head of the Criminal Law department from 2012 to 2016. His main areas of academic activity include Criminal Law, Criminal Procedure, Human Rights Law, Constitutional Law, International Law, and Criminology.

=== Legal career ===
Bošnjak joined the Law Firm Čeferin, the largest Slovenian law firm, in 2008, where he became a partner in 2012. During his time, he was the head of the Constitutional and International Law departments, and attorney specialist in Criminal Law matters. He represented clients in several landmark domestic cases, such as that of Franc Kangler, the former mayor of Maribor, Zoran Janković, the mayor of Ljubljana, Igor Bavčar, the former Minister of Interior and Head of Istrabenz Holding. Internationally, he represented clients before the European Court of Human Rights and the General Court of the European Union. Because of his mandate as a Judge of the European Court of Human Rights, Bošnjak's attorney status has been put on hold since 2016.

=== Judicial career ===
In 2016, Bošnjak was elected judge of the European Court of Human Rights in Strasbourg, France, in respect of Slovenia. He became Vice-President of Section II in 2019, President of Section I in 2022, and Vice-President of the Court in November 2022. Finally, he served as the President of the Court between July 2024 and May 2025. At the European Court of Human Rights, he presided over the Grand Chamber in the case of Hurbain vs. Belgium, and over chambers in several landmark judgements of the Court, such as Żurek vs. Poland, Juszczyszyn vs. Poland, Tuleya vs. Poland, Safi and others vs. Greece, Darboe and Camarra vs. Italy, and Alhowais vs. Hungary. He submitted several resonant separate opinions in various landmark judgements of the Court, including Big rother Watch and others vs. The UK, Murtazaliyeva vs. Russia, and Zlicic vs. Serbia. In June 2025, he was appointed as a judge at the European Court of Justice for the remainder of the term of judge Marko Ilešič, who died in office in 2024.

== Personal life ==
Bošnjak is married to Petra Stanonik Bošnjak, a Slovenian lawyer, with whom he has four children.
