= Ramona Frendo =

Maltese jurist (born 1971)

Judge at the European Court of Justice
- Incumbent
- Assumed office 7 October 2024
- Nominated by: Government of Malta
- Preceded by: Peter George Xuereb

Personal details
- Born: 1971 (age 54–55) Żejtun, Malta
- Education: University of Malta; Cambridge University; King's College London

Ramona Frendo (born 1971) is a Maltese jurist, judge at the European Court of Justice with respect to Malta since 2024. She previously served as judge of the General Court of the European Union alongside Eugène Buttigieg between 2019 and 2024. Frendo have also a long career as lawyer in Malta.

== Early life and education ==
Frendo was born in 1971 in Żejtun, Malta. Frendo graduated with a law degree from the University of Malta in 1993, where she obtained her PhD in law in 1995. Subsequently, in 1996, she obtained a master's degree in criminology from the Cambridge University and, in 2018, a postgraduate degree in European law from King's College London.

== Career ==
She began her career as a lawyer in 1996 and specialises in civil and family law, insurance law, labour law and criminal law.

Between 1997 and 1998, she was a legal adviser at the Ministry of Social Protection, and a legal expert at the courts in La Valletta between 1997 and 2019 and at insurance companies from 2006 to 2019. She has also been a member of the country's national panel of arbitrators between 2006 and 2019, the Malta Employment Commission from 2009 to 2019 and the National Family Commission from 2012 to 2013.

In 2013, she joined the Commission for the Holistic Reform of the Judicial System responsible for reviewing procedural and substantive law and, between 2014 and 2016, she was a member of the Legal Commission.

At European level, Frendo was appointed special adviser to the European Council's Working Party on Visas in 2016 and chair of that working party during 2017 Maltese Presidency of the Council of the European Union.

Frendo was appointed judge of the General Court of the European Union in March 2019 and her term began on 6 March 2019 replacing Peter George Xuereb.

On 23 January 2024, the Minister for Justice and Construction Sector Reform Jonathan Attard announced that the Maltese government had nominated Frendo as Malta's candidate for the European Court of Justice to succeed Xuereb. She was confirmed on 22 May 2024 and was sworn in on 7 October 2024.
