= Mattias Guyomar =

French lawyer and judge

President of the European Court of Human Rights
- Incumbent
- Assumed office 30 May 2025
- Preceded by: Marko Bošnjak

Judge at the European Court of Human Rights
- Incumbent
- Assumed office 22 June 2020
- Preceded by: André Potocki

Personal details
- Born: 21 July 1968 (age 58) Guérande, France
- Education: University of Nantes (Bachelor in Modern Literature); Institut d'études politiques de Paris (IEP – laureate); École nationale d'administration (ENA)
- Occupation: Jurist; judge

Mattias Guyomar (born 21 July 1968) is a French judge at the European Court of Human Rights, currently serving as its President.

== Early life and education ==
Guyomar was born on 21 July 1968 in Guérande, France. He first completed a licence (Bachelor’s) in modern literature at the University of Nantes from 1986 to 1989. He then attended the Institut d’études politiques de Paris (IEP) from 1989 to 1991, becoming a "laureate" of the institution. Afterwards, he studied at the École nationale d’administration (ENA) from 1993 to 1996.

== Legal and academic career ==
In 1996, Guyomar entered the French Conseil d'État (Council of State) as rapporteur in the Judicial Division (Section du contentieux), where he served from 1996 to 1999. Concurrently he lectured at the IEP Paris and the ENA in public and comparative law from 1996 to 2007.

From 1998 to 2020, he was Secretary-General of the French Electoral Commission ("Commission des sondages"). He also served as Director of the Legal Documentation and Co-ordination Centre of the Conseil d'État (1999–2002) and as General Rapporteur of the Haut Conseil à l'intégration (1999–2002).

Between 2002 and 2011, he was Government Commissioner ("commissaire du gouvernement") then Public Rapporteur ("rapporteur public") at the Judicial Division and the Jurisdiction Disputes Tribunal ("Tribunal des conflits").

He was Associate Professor of Public Law at University Paris-Sud XI (2004–2012) and at University Paris 2 – Panthéon-Assas (2012–2020). From 2011 to 2020 he served as a member of the 6th and then 10th Chamber of the Judicial Division of the Conseil d'État, as well as urgent-applications judge ("juge des référés"). In 2016 he became President of the 10th Chamber of the Judicial Division.

== Service at the European Court of Human Rights ==
Guyomar was elected as the judge in respect of France at the European Court of Human Rights on 22 June 2020. On 2 May 2024, he became President of Section. On 28 April 2025, he was elected President of the Court, to take up office on 30 May 2025, succeeding Marko Bošnjak.

As President, Guyomar presides over plenary meetings of the Court, Grand Chamber sessions, and the Bureau of the Court, assisted by the Registrar and the President’s Private Office.

== Selected publications and speeches ==
- "Discours de Mattias Guyomar" — speech at MEDEL 40th Anniversary Conference, Strasbourg, 3 June 2025.
- "Discours de Mattias Guyomar" — speech to the Parliamentary Assembly of the Council of Europe, 24 June 2025.
