= Eugène Buttigieg =

Maltese judge (born 1961)

Judge of the General Court of the European Union
- Incumbent
- Assumed office 2012

Personal details
- Born: 1961 (age 64–65)
- Profession: Judge, legal scholar

Eugène Buttigieg (born 1961) is a Maltese judge on the General Court of the European Union. He is also a legal scholar specialising in European Union law, with a particular focus on consumer protection and EU judicial structures.

Alongside his academic work, Buttigieg has held various professional roles within the Maltese public administration, including service as a senior legal officer at the Ministry of Foreign Affairs and later as a legal consultant to the Consumer and Competition Division, reflecting his long-standing engagement with European and consumer law.

== Career ==
Buttigieg has served as an associate professor within the Department of European and Comparative Law at the University of Malta, where his teaching and research have centred on European Union law and consumer protection. He has also been affiliated with international research institutions, including the British Institute of International and Comparative Law in London, where he acted as a Visiting Fellow in European law.

In 2012, the Maltese government nominated Buttigieg to serve as a judge at the General Court of the European Union, part of the Court of Justice of the European Union. The nomination followed the retirement of Judge Ena Cremona and the rejection of an earlier Maltese candidate, highlighting the challenges faced by member states in meeting the court’s stringent selection criteria.

Judicial appointments to the General Court are subject to assessment by an independent panel of former judges and senior experts in EU law, and national nominations require formal vetting before confirmation. Contemporary reporting noted that the limited pool of candidates with extensive expertise in European Union law complicated Malta’s efforts to secure a successor to the retiring judge.

== Publications ==
Buttigieg has contributed to legal scholarship through editorial work in the field of European consumer law. He is the editor of Rights and Remedies for the Consumer in the European Union, a volume that brings together contributions from leading European academics and legal practitioners specialising in consumer protection law.

The book examines remedies for unfair contract terms, enforcement mechanisms for consumer rights, redress for unfair commercial practices, consumer protection in financial services, and the role of alternative dispute resolution. It also addresses sector-specific issues such as consumer rights in online transactions and package travel within the European Union.
