= Helena Malikova =

European civil servant and academic

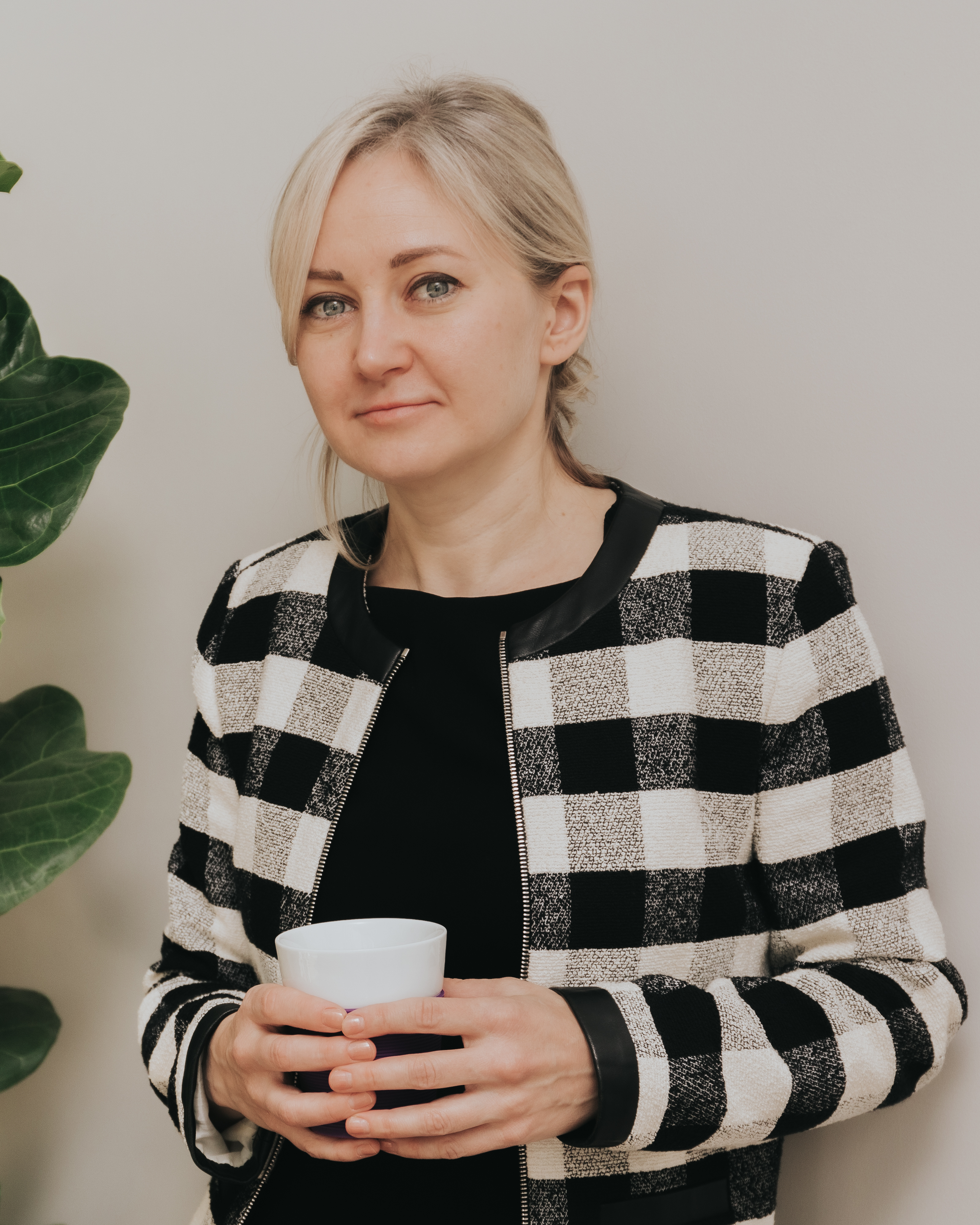
- Helena Malikova in 2022
- Born: Helena Malíková; 1983 (age 42–43)
- Education: College of Europe
- Occupation: EU civil servant

Helena Malikova (born 1983) is a French-Slovak civil servant and an academic. She holds both French and Slovak passports, having migrated to France with her parents.

Malikova has been overseeing at the European Commission the investigation in the EU Apple State aid case against Ireland. In 2016, the case resulted in a claim of 13 billion euro of unpaid taxes owed by Apple to Ireland.

Malikova started her career with Société Générale and Credit Suisse as a Foreign Exchange (FX) sales trader.

== Academic work ==
Malikova is affiliated with European and American universities. She is a fellow at Harvard Kennedy School's Carr Center for Human Rights Policy, as well as a fellow at the Hertie School in Berlin. Her academic research pertains to questions of regulation of artificial intelligence (AI) and of global leadership in AI. Malikova's other academic work relates to competition policy and surveillance capitalism.

She was a fellow at UC Berkeley in California over the academic year 2016/17. Malikova is an alumna of the College of Europe.

== European Commission ==
Malikova joined the European civil service in 2009. Her prior job was with the bank Credit Suisse.

At the European Commission, Malikova is working on antitrust matters and on the issue of increasing corporate market power. She has been involved in a number of investigations by the European Commission into tax arrangements by multinational corporations, including Apple, Amazon, Starbucks, Fiat and Engie.

She is a frequent commentator on questions of diversity and gender equality at the EU institutions.

Malikova shed light on undue influence of economic consultancies, such as CRA in merger control by the EU in an academic article published in 2023. Malikova was removed from her role at the chief economist team of the Directorate-General for Competition of the European Commission in July that year, at the time of the nomination of Fiona Scott Morton, an academic and consultant for CRA, as new chief economist. Fiona Scott Morton's nomination was ultimately derailed by concerns of conflict of interest, that were expressed by the European Parliament and French President Emmanuel Macron.
