= Paul John Mahoney =

Sir Paul John Mahoney KCMG (born 1946) is a British jurist who was a judge of the European Court of Human Rights. He was the first president of European Union Civil Service Tribunal, serving from 2005 to 2011.

== Education ==
Mahoney studied law at the University of Oxford, graduating Bachelor of Arts and later proceeding Master of Arts in 1967. He subsequently studied law at University College London and obtained a Master of Laws degree in 1969.

== Academia ==
From 1967 to 1973, Mahoney was a lecturer at the law faculty of University College London. From 1972 to 1974, Mahoney was a barrister in London. In 1988, Mahoney was appointed a visiting professor at the University of Saskatchewan, Saskatoon.

== Europe ==
From 1974 to 1990, Mahoney was an administrator and subsequently the Principal Administrator of the European Court of Human Rights. He then became the Head of Personnel, Council of Europe, until 1995 when he was named Deputy Registrar in 2001. From that post, he was promoted to Registrar of the European Court of Human Rights, which role he served in until September 2005.

Mahoney was nominated by the College of Judges to become the first President of the European Union Civil Service Tribunal on 6 October 2005. On 7 October 2011, he was replaced by Sean Van Raepenbusch.

On 27 June 2012, he was elected by the Parliamentary Assembly of the Council of Europe to replace Sir Nicolas Bratza as the UK's judge on the European Court of Human Rights, which role he took up on 1 November 2012. Mahoney was replaced by Tim Eicke as the United Kingdom's judge on 12 September 2016.

== See also ==
- European Union Civil Service Tribunal
