= Küllike Jürimäe =

Estonian lawyer and judge

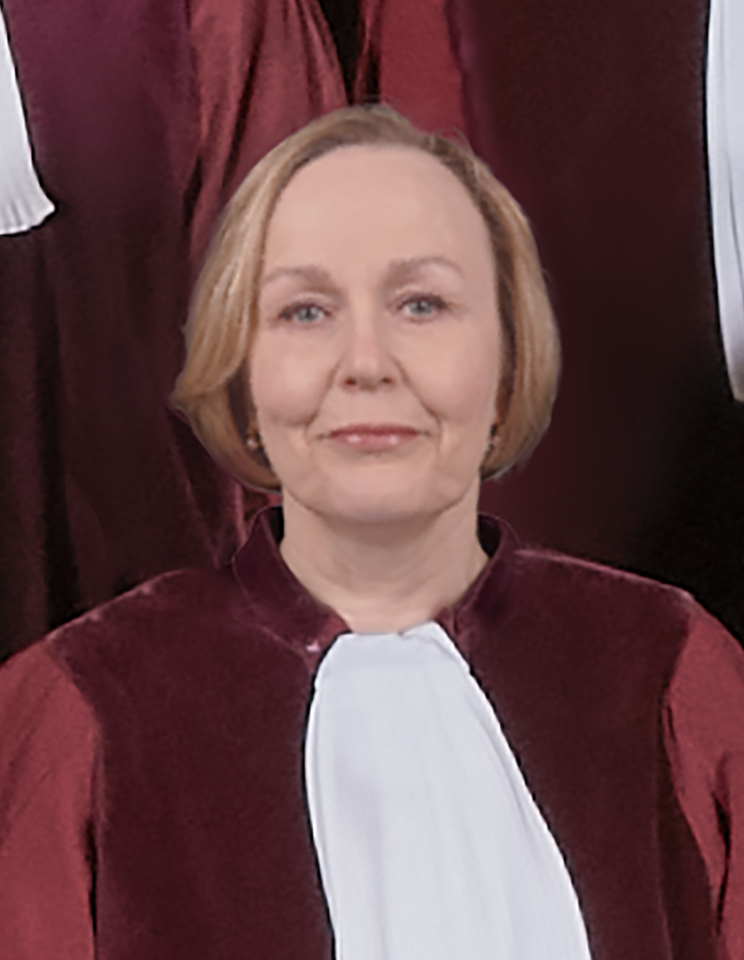

Judge at the General Court of the European Union
- In office 2004–2013

Judge at the Court of Justice of the European Union
- Incumbent
- Assumed office 2015

Personal details
- Citizenship: Estonia
- Education: University of Tartu

Küllike Jürimäe (born 1962) is an Estonian jurist and a current judge at the Court of Justice of the European Union.

== Early life and education ==
In 1981 Jürimäe entered law school at the University of Tartu, from where she graduated in 1986.

== Career ==
Following her graduation, Jürimäe entered the public administration and became an assistant to the Public Prosecutor of Tallinn from 1986 until 1991. From 1991 onwards she followed up on her studies at the Estonian school of diplomacy from where she obtained her diploma in 1992. Besides, she was a legal adviser from 1991 and a general counsellor from 1992, both at the Chamber of Commerce and Industry of Estland. She became a Judge at the Court of Appeal of Tallinn in 1993, a post she held until 2004. Between 2002 and 2003 she followed up on her studies at the Universities of Padua and Nottingham and graduated with a European master's degree in Democratization and Human Rights.

On 12 May 2004 Jürimäe became a Judge at the General Court of the European Union, from where she resigned on 23 October 2013. On 1 April 2015, she was one of the six newly nominated judges at the European Court of Justice in Luxembourg for a six-year term beginning on 7 October 2015. In 2021, she was re-appointed for another term until 2027.
