= Andrei Popescu =

Romanian lawyer and judge

Andrei Popescu (born 1948) is a Romanian lawyer and a judge at the General Court of the European Union.

He graduated in law from the University of Bucharest in 1971 and obtained his doctorate (Doctor in Laws) in 1980. From 1971 to 1973, he was trainee assistant lecturer; from 1974 to 1985, he was a tenured assistant lecturer; and from 1985 to 1990 he was a lecturer in labour law at the University of Bucharest. From 1991 to 1991, he was a principal researcher at the National Research Institute for Labour and Social Protection. In 1991 he became Deputy Director at the Ministry of Labour and Social Protection and was Director from 1992 to 1996. From 1997 he was a senior lecturer at the National University of Political Studies and Public Administration in Bucharest, becoming a professor in 2000. From 2001 to 2005, he was State Secretary at the Ministry for European Integration (2001–05). From 1996 to 2001 and from 2005 to 2009, he was also Head of Department at the Legislative Council of Romania.

He was founding editor of the Romanian Review of European Law, and President of the Romanian Society for European Law from 2009 to 2010.

From 2009 to 2010 he was agent of the Romanian Government before the Courts of the European Union, and since 26 November 2010, he has been a judge at the General Court of the European Union.
