= Marc Jaeger =

Jurist and judge from Luxembourg

Marc Jaeger (born 1954) is a jurist from Luxembourg, and a judge at the General Court of the EU. He was appointed in 1996. In 2007, he became President of the court.

He studied law at the University of Strasbourg and the College of Europe (1979–1980 promotion).
