= Bo Vesterdorf =

Danish judge (born 1945)

Bo Vesterdorf (born 1945) is a former Danish judge who has been President of the European Court of First Instance.

Since late 2008 Vesterdorf has been a Consultant in the Competition practice at Herbert Smith Freehills.

Vesterdorf began his career as a lawyer-linguist at the European Court of Justice before becoming Administrator in the Danish Ministry of Justice, examining magistrate, and Legal Attaché in the Permanent Representation of Denmark to the European Communities.

He was a Temporary Judge at the Østre Landsret (Danish Court of Appeal), Head of the Constitutional and Administrative Law Division in the Ministry of Justice, Director of the Administration Department in the Ministry of Justice, and a university lecturer. He also served as a member of the Steering Committee on Human Rights at the Council of Europe, and subsequently as a member of its Bureau. In 2004 he became a member of the "Ad hoc committee on judicial training" at the Academy of European Law, Trier, Germany. He was a judge at the European Court of First Instance from 25 September 1989 and its president from 4 March 1998 to 17 September 2007.

Vesterdorf has been Commander 1st Degree of the Danish Royal Order of the Dannebrog since 20 June 2006. On 1 November 2007 he was appointed Senior Legal Consultant at Plesner Law Firm in Copenhagen. He is an external fellow at University College London's Faculty of Law and is attached to St Gallen University, Switzerland and Fordham Law School, New York. In May 2008 he was made Doctor of Laws honoris causa by St Gallen University.
