= Tim Eicke =

British barrister (born 1966)

Sir Tim Eicke KCMG KC

Judge of the European Court of Human Rights in respect of the United Kingdom
- Incumbent
- Assumed office 12 September 2016
- Nominated by: Michael Gove
- Appointed by: Parliamentary Assembly of the Council of Europe
- Preceded by: Paul Mahoney

Personal details
- Born: 27 July 1966 (age 60) Hanover, West Germany
- Education: University of Dundee; University of Passau
- Profession: Barrister

Sir Tim Eicke KCMG KC (born 27 July 1966) is a German-born British barrister and Judge of the European Court of Human Rights.

== Education ==
Eicke studied German law at the University of Passau in south-east Germany, graduating in 1988. From there, he crossed the channel to Britain where he undertook further study in both Scots and English law at the University of Dundee. He is fluent in German and English and is highly proficient in French. In June 2017, Eicke received an Honorary Doctorate from the University of Dundee.

== Career ==
After working as a legal consultant for an oil and gas information company, Eicke was called to the bar in 1993 at Middle Temple. In 1999, Eicke joined Essex Court Chambers gaining expertise in the fields of European Union and international human rights law and regularly appearing in the European Court of Justice, the European Court of Human Rights as well as domestic courts including the UK Supreme Court. Between 2004 and 2015, Mr. Eicke was a trustee/board member of INTERIGHTS, the International Centre for the Legal Protection of Human Rights, in London. Between 2000 and 2007, he also served on the board of the Advice on Individual Rights in Europe (AIRE center).

Eicke was on the panel of counsel for the Equality and Human Rights Commission (2011–2015) in addition to editing the European Human Rights Reports.

Eicke was appointed Queen's Counsel in 2011 and was subsequently elected as Britain's judge in the European Court of Human Rights in 2016 after a clear majority of representatives of the Council of Europe voted him in.

He sat in the case Chowdury and others v. Greece, in which The AIRE Centre was a third party. Due to past links with this organisation, this has been pointed out as a possible conflict of interest.

== Memberships ==
Administrative and Constitutional Law Bar Association, American Society of International Law; Bar European Group; British-German Jurists Association; Commercial Bar Association (COMBAR); Immigration Law Practitioners' Association; International Court of Arbitration; Justice Expert Panel on Human Rights in the EU; Lawyers for Liberty; Lincolns Inn; London Common Law and Commercial Bar Association; UK Association of European Law.
