= Maria Eugénia Martins de Nazaré Ribeiro =

Portuguese judge

Maria Eugénia Martins de Nazaré Ribeiro (born 1956) is a Portuguese judge and a former member of the General Court of the European Union.

She studied in Lisbon, Brussels and Strasbourg, she's a member of the Bar in Portugal and Brussels. As part of her studies, she was also an independent researcher at the Institut d'études européennes de l'université libre de Bruxelles (Institute of European Studies, Free University of Brussels).

She was a Judge at the General Court from 2003 until 2016.

Since 2018, she is a member of the panel foreseen by Article 255 of the Treaty on the Functioning of the European Union, which gives an opinion on candidates' suitability to perform the duties of Judge and Advocate-General of the Court of Justice and the General Court before the governments of the Member States appoint them.
