= Rules of Procedure of the Court of Justice =

Component of European Union law

European Union
- Citation: OJ L173
- Territorial extent: European Union
- Passed: 1952

The Rules of Procedure of the Court of Justice (OJ L173) are a part of EU law concerning how the Court of Justice of the European Union should function.

== See also ==
- EU law
