= General Court (European Union) =

Part of the Court of Justice of the European Union

Coordinates: 49.6210°N 6.1431°E

Court of Justice of the European Union General Court
- Emblem of the Court of Justice of the European Union
- Interactive map of Court of Justice of the European Union; General Court
- Established: 1989
- Jurisdiction: European Union and Northern Ireland (Note: Under the terms of the Protocol on Ireland/Northern Ireland, concluded as part of the Brexit withdrawal agreement, the CJEU – and hence the EGC – continues to have jurisdiction over the operation of EU law applying to Northern Ireland in relation to customs and the movement of goods, technical regulations, VAT and excise, the Single Electricity Market and State aid, and may hear applications for preliminary rulings made by Northern Irish courts.)
- Location: Palais de la Cour de Justice, Kirchberg, Luxembourg City, Luxembourg
- Authorised by: Treaties of the European Union
- Appeals to: European Court of Justice
- Number of positions: 54 judges (2 per member state); 5 vacant
- Website: curia.europa.eu

President
- Currently: Savvas Papasavvas
- Since: 16 September 2026

Vice-President
- Currently: Maria José Costeira
- Since: 23 September 2026

Registrar
- Currently: Vacant
- Since: 8 October 2026

Division map

The General Court (French: Tribunal), informally known as the European General Court (abbr. EGC), is a constituent court of the Court of Justice of the European Union. It hears actions taken against the institutions of the European Union by individuals and member states, although certain matters are reserved for the European Court of Justice. Decisions of the General Court can be appealed to the Court of Justice, but only on a point of law. Prior to the coming into force of the Lisbon Treaty on 1 December 2009, it was known as the Court of First Instance of the European Communities.

== Competence ==
The General Court has competence over the following cases.

- Actions for annulment brought by individuals

Such actions are brought by individuals against acts of the Union institutions. To be admissible, the act being challenged must either be directly addressed to the person; or be a regulatory act that directly affects that person and needs no further implementing measure to come into effect; or directly and individually concern the legal situation of the person bringing the case.

- Actions for annulment brought by EU member states

Such actions are brought by EU member states against acts of the European Commission. Sometimes acts of the Council of the EU can also be targeted, if they concern state aid, trade and anti-dumping issues or other acts where the Council exercises implementing powers.

- Actions for failure to act by individuals

These actions can be brought when a EU institution has been asked to act but has failed to do so.

- Actions for damages

Actions for the reparation of damage caused by unlawful conduct on the part of a Union institution.

- Actions based on an arbitration clause

Disputes concerning contracts in public or private law entered into by the Union, containing such a clause.

- Actions concerning the civil service (disputes between the Union and its officials and other servants) – from 2005 to 2016 these cases were transferred to the European Union Civil Service Tribunal, but returned to the General Court when its size was doubled.
- References for preliminary rulings

All such cases are initially brought before the Court of Justice, which can then transfer them to the General Court when they concern:

- VAT
- customs, excise duties or the tariff classification of goods
- greenhouse gas emissions trading
- passenger compensation

The Court of Justice does not transfer these cases, and instead rules itself, when they involve a decision of principle that may affect the unity or consistency of EU law.

- Staff cases

Cases where a member of the staff of an EU institution has a grievance towards its employer. Originally dealt with by the European Union Civil Service Tribunal, the General Court took them over when the Tribunal was dissolved on 1 September 2016.

All cases heard at first instance by the General Court may be subject to a right of appeal to the Court of Justice on points of law only. However, due to the high number of appeals lodged, a mechanism is now in place to filter them and allow only a few to reach the Court of Justice.

== Composition ==
Since February 2020 the General Court is composed of 54 Judges; this follows a 2016 reform which increased the number of judges to two per member state by 2019, and the departure of the UK from the EU at the end of January 2020. The Judges are appointed for a renewable term of six years by common accord of the governments of the Member States. As of February 2020, there are 49 Judges in post: 23 member states have nominated both their judges, whilst Latvia, Poland, and Slovakia have nominated just one, and Slovenia has nominated neither.

The members of the General Court elect their president and the presidents of the Chambers of five Judges from among their number for a renewable period of three years.

There are no permanent Advocates General attached to the General Court (unlike the European Court of Justice, which has eleven Advocates General). However, the task of an Advocate General may be performed in a limited number of cases by a Judge nominated to do so. In practice this has been done occasionally.

=== List of presidents ===
Elected	Term ended	Judge
25 September 1989	18 September 1995	(Portugal) José Luís da Cruz Vilaça
18 September 1995	4 March 1998	(Italy) Antonio Saggio
4 March 1998	17 September 2007	(Denmark) Bo Vesterdorf
17 September 2007	26 September 2019	(Luxembourg) Marc Jaeger
27 September 2019	16 September 2026	(Netherlands) Marc van der Woude
16 September 2026	Incumbent	(Cyprus) Savvas Papasavvas

=== List of vice-presidents ===
Elected	Term ended	Judge
17 September 2013	19 September 2016	(Finland) Heikki Kanninen
20 September 2016	26 September 2019	(Netherlands) Marc van der Woude
27 September 2019	16 September 2026	(Cyprus) Savvas Papasavvas
23 September 2026	Incumbent	(Portugal) Maria José Costeira

=== List of judges ===
Name	Country	Elected	Current term ends	Other
Viktor Kreuschitz	Austria	2013	2022	
Gerhard Hesse	Austria	2019	2022	
Paul Nihoul	Belgium	2016	2022	
Geert De Baere	Belgium	2017	2022	
Mariyana Kancheva	Bulgaria	2011	2025	
Alexander Kornezov	Bulgaria	2016	2025	President of the Tenth Chamber
Vesna Tomljenović	Croatia	2013	2025	President of the Second Chamber
Tamara Perišin	Croatia	2019	2025	
Savvas Papasavvas	Cyprus	2004	2022	Vice-president of the General Court (2019–2022)
Anna Marcoulli	Cyprus	2016	2022	President of the Sixth Chamber
Petra Škvařilová-Pelzl	Czech Republic	2019	2025	
David Petrlík	Czech Republic	2021	2025	
Sten Frimodt Nielsen	Denmark	2007	2022	
Jesper Svenningsen	Denmark	2016	2022	President of the Eighth Chamber
Lauri Madise	Estonia	2013	2022	
Iko Nõmm	Estonia	2019	2022	
Heikki Kanninen	Finland	2009	2022	President of the First Chamber; Vice-president of the General Court (2013–2016)
Tuula Pynnä	Finland	2019	2022	
Stéphane Gervasoni	France	2013	2025	President of the Fourth Chamber
Laurent Truchot	France	2019	2025	Judge (2007–2013)
Johannes Laitenberger	Germany	2019	2025	
Gabriele Steinfatt	Germany	2019	2025	
Dimitris Gratsias	Greece	2010	2022	
Constantinos Iliopoulos	Greece	2016	2022	
TBA	Hungary			
Zoltán Csehi	Hungary	2016	2022	
Suzanne Kingston	(Republic of Ireland) Ireland	2021	2025	
Colm Mac Eochaidh	(Republic of Ireland) Ireland	2017	2025	
Roberto Mastroianni	Italy	2019	2025	
Ornella Porchia	Italy	2019	2025	
TBA	Latvia			
Inga Reine	Latvia	2016	2025	
Rimvydas Norkus	Lithuania	2019	2025	
Virgilijus Valančius	Lithuania	2016	2019*	
Marc Jaeger	Luxembourg	1996	2022	President of the General Court (2007–2019)
Dean Spielmann	Luxembourg	2016	2022	President of the Fifth Chamber
Eugène Buttigieg	Malta	2012	2025	
Ramona Frendo	Malta	2019	2025	
Marc van der Woude	Netherlands	2010	2022	President of the General Court (2019–2022); Vice-president of the General Court (2016–2019)
René Barents	Netherlands	2016	2022	
Krystyna Kowalik-Bańczyk	Poland	2016	2022	
Nina Półtorak	Poland	2016	2016*	
Ion Gâlea	Romania	2021	2022	
Mirela Stancu	Romania	2019	2022	
Ricardo Da Silva Passos	Portugal	2016	2022	President of the Seventh Chamber
Maria José Costeira	Portugal	2016	2022	President of the Ninth Chamber
Juraj Schwarcz	Slovakia	2009	2022	
TBA	Slovakia			
Maja Brkan	Slovenia	2021	2025	
Damjan Kukovec	Slovenia	TBA		
José Martín y Pérez de Nanclares	Spain	2019	2025	
Miguel Sampol Pucurull	Spain	2019	2025	
Ulf Christophe Öberg	Sweden	2016	2025	
Fredrik Schalin	Sweden	2016	2025	

* Judge continues to hold the office until their successor takes up the duties according to the Article 5(3) of the Protocol No. 3 on the Statute of the Court of Justice of the EU

=== List of former judges ===
Name	Country	Elected	Term ended	Ref.
Josef Azizi	Austria	19 January 1995	16 September 2013	
Koen Lenaerts	Belgium	25 September 1989	6 October 2003	
Franklin Dehousse	Belgium	6 October 2003	19 September 2016	
Teodor Tchipev	Bulgaria	12 January 2007	29 June 2010	
Irena Pelikánová	Czech Republic	12 May 2004	26 September 2019	
Jan M. Passer	Czech Republic	19 September 2016	6 October 2020	
Bo Versterdorf	Denmark	25 September 1989	17 September 2007	
Küllike Jürimäe	Estonia	12 May 2004	23 October 2013	
Virpi Tiili	Finland	8 January 1995	6 October 2009	
Jacques Biancarelli	France	25 September 1989	18 September 1995	
André Potocki	France	18 September 1995	19 September 2001	
Hubert Legal	France	19 September 2001	17 September 2007	
Heinrich Kirschner	Germany	25 September 1989	6 February 1997	
Jörg Pirrung	Germany	11 June 1997	17 September 2007	
Alfred Dittrich	Germany	17 September 2007	26 September 2019	
Christos G. Yeraris	Greece	25 September 1989	18 September 1992	
Andreas Kalogerpoulos	Greece	18 September 1992	17 September 1998	
Michail Vilaras	Greece	17 September 1998	25 October 2010	
Ottó Czúcz	Hungary	12 May 2004	19 September 2016	
Barna Berke	Hungary	19 September 2016	2 August 2021	
Donal Barrington	(Republic of Ireland) Ireland	25 September 1989	10 January 1996	
John Cooke	(Republic of Ireland) Ireland	10 January 1996	15 September 2008	
Kevin O'Higgins	(Republic of Ireland) Ireland	15 September 2008	16 September 2013	
Anthony M. Collins	(Republic of Ireland) Ireland	16 September 2013	7 October 2021	
Antonio Saggio	Italy	25 September 1989	4 March 1998	
Paolo Mengozzi	Italy	4 March 1998	3 May 2006	
Enzo Moavero Milanesi	Italy	3 May 2006	15 November 2011	
Guido Berardis	Italy	17 September 2012	31 August 2019	
Ezio Perillo	Italy	19 September 2016	26 September 2019	
Ingrida Labucka	Latvia	12 May 2004	25 February 2020	
Vilenas Vadapalas	Lithuania	12 May 2004	16 September 2013	
Egidijus Bieliūnas	Lithuania	16 September 2013	26 September 2019	
Romain Schintgen	Luxembourg	25 September 1989	11 July 1996	
Ena Cremona	Malta	12 May 2004	22 March 2012	
Peter George Xuereb	Malta	6 June 2016	8 October 2018	
Cornelis Paulus Briët	Netherlands	25 September 1989	17 September 1998	
Arjen Meij	Netherlands	17 September 1998	13 September 2010	
Irena Wiszniewska-Bialecka	Poland	15 May 2004	19 September 2016	
Nina Półtorak	Poland	13 April 2016	31 August 2016	
José Luis Da Cruz Vilaça	Portugal	25 September 1989	18 September 1995	
Rui Manuel Gens De Moura Ramos	Portugal	19 September 1995	31 March 2003	
Maria Eguénia Martins De Nazaré Ribeiro	Portugal	31 March 2003	19 September 2016	
Valeriu M. Ciuca	Romania	12 January 2007	26 November 2010	
Andrei Popescu	Romania	26 November 2010	19 September 2016	
Octavia Spineanu-Matei	Romania	19 September 2016	7 October 2021	
Daniel Šváby	Slovakia	21 May 2004	6 October 2010	
Verica Trstenjak	Slovenia	7 July 2004	6 October 2006	
Miro Prek	Slovenia	6 October 2006	26 September 2019	
Rafael Garcia-Valdecasas Y Fernández	Spain	25 September 1989	17 September 2007	
Santiago Soldevila Fragoso	Spain	17 September 2007	16 September 2013	
Ignacio Ulloa Rubio	Spain	16 September 2013	26 September 2019	
Leopoldo Calvo-Sotelo Ibáñez-Martín	Spain	13 April 2016	26 September 2019	
Pernilla Lindh	Sweden	18 January 1995	6 October 2006	
Nils Wahl	Sweden	6 October 2006	28 November 2012	
Carl Wetter	Sweden	18 March 2013	19 September 2016	
Former Member State
David A. O. Edward	United Kingdom	25 September 1989	10 March 1992	
Christopher William Bellamy	United Kingdom	10 March 1992	15 December 1999	
Nicholas James Forwood	United Kingdom	15 December 1999	7 October 2015	
Ian Stewart Forrester	United Kingdom	1 October 2015	31 January 2020	

=== List of registrars ===
Elected	Term ended	Judge
27 September 1989	6 October 2005	(European Union) (Germany) Hans Jung
6 October 2005	30 April 2023	(European Union) (France) Emmanuel Coulon
5 June 2023	Incumbent	(European Union) (Italy) Vittorio Di Bucci

== Procedure ==
The General Court has its own Rules of Procedure. The 1991 rules were replaced by revised Rules of Procedure which came into effect on 1 July 2015. The Court's procedure includes a written phase and an oral phase. The proceedings are conducted in the language chosen by the petitioner. As in the European Court of Justice, the working language of the Court is nevertheless French, and this includes the language the judges deliberate in and the drafting language of preliminary reports and judgments.

The Court is separated into 9 divisions (called 'chambers') sat by 3-judge benches, except for the 7th division whose bench is sat by 4 judges. Each chamber has an extended composition of 5 judges. Cases are assigned by the President of the Court to a relevant divisional presiding judge. The presiding judge assigned to the case then chooses a judge-reporter (judge-rapporteur) from the judges of the division, whose clerks write a preliminary report (rapport préalable) based on the parties' pleadings and applicable law.

At the close of the written phase and, as the case may be, on adoption of measures of inquiry, the case is argued orally in open court. The proceedings are interpreted simultaneously, if necessary, into various official languages of the European Union. The judges then deliberate based on a draft judgment prepared by the judge-reporter. The Court's final judgment is handed down in open court.
