= Mariyana Kancheva =

Judge at the General Court of the European Union
- Incumbent
- Assumed office 19 September 2011

Mariyana Kancheva (Bulgarian: Марияна Кънчева, born 1958) is a Bulgarian lawyer and a judge at the General Court of the European Union.

She graduated with degree in law at the University of Sofia (1979–84); post-master's degree in European law at the Institute for European Studies, Free University of Brussels (2008–09); specialisation in economic law and intellectual property law; Trainee judge at the Regional Court, Sofia (1985–86); Legal adviser (1986–88); Lawyer at the Sofia bar (1988–92); Director-General of the Services Office for the Diplomatic Corps at the Ministry of Foreign Affairs (1992–94); pursuit of the profession of lawyer in Sofia (1994-2011) and Brussels (2007–11); Arbitrator in Sofia for the resolution of commercial disputes; participation in the drafting of various legislative texts as legal adviser to the Bulgarian parliament; Judge at the General Court since 19 September 2011.
