= Ena Cremona =

Maltese judge (1936–24 May 2024)

Personal details
- Born: 1936
- Died: May 24, 2024 (aged 87–88)
- Education: University of Malta

Ena Cremona (1936–24 May 2024) was a Maltese judge. She was the first woman litigation lawyer in Malta. Cremona was a judge at the European Union General Court between 12 May 2004 and 22 March 2012.

== Career ==
Cremona attended the University of Malta, graduating in 1955 with a bachelor's degree in languages and in 1958 with a law degree. She was the second woman lawyer to graduate from the university, and the first to practice law. However, Cremona did not like to speak on being a woman lawyer. In one interview in the 1990s, she advised a journalist to "never join a women's group or a women's network, because they're ghettos". She practiced with the Malta Bar from 1959. She was a specialist in "social and commercial law".

Between 1987 and 1989, she served on the Public Service Commission. She served on the European Commission against Racism and Intolerance in 2003 and 2004.

In 2007, Cremona was reappointed to another a second six-year term. She resigned from the court in 2011, ahead of her term end in August 2013. However, due to a rule that judges cannot leave without a replacement, Cremona continued to hold the position for another year after her resignation.

== Recognitions ==
Cremona was made an Officer of the Order of merit on 13 December 2006.

== Personal life and death ==
Cremona was married and had children; her husband died early in their marriage.

Cremona suffered from ill health in her later years. She died on 24 May 2024.
