= André Potocki =

- Incumbent
- Assumed office 4 November 2011
- Preceded by: Jean-Paul Costa

Personal details
- Born: 21 June 1950 (age 76) Lyon, France
- Education: French National School for the Judiciary
- Profession: Lawyer
- Website: www.echr.coe.int

André Potocki (born 21 June 1950 in Lyon) is a French jurist and was appointed a judge of the European Court of Human Rights on 4 November 2011.

== Career ==
Potocki served as a judge in the Court of First Instance of the European Communities from 1995 to 2001. From 2002 to 2006, he acted as Vice-President of the Council of Europe's European Commission for the Efficiency of Justice.

From 2005, Potocki was a judge at the Cour of Cassation, France's highest court. Previously, he had been President of one of the Paris Court of Appeal's chambers after having been a judge of that court.

In the course of his career, Judge Potocki has held a range of high-profile administrative positions such as Executive Secretary to the Paris High Court (Tribunal de grande instance de Paris), to the Chief Justice of the Paris Cour of Appeal, and to the Chief Justice of the Cour de cassation. Judge Potocki is a former Associate Professor at the Université de Paris X-Nanterre. A frequent lecturer on a variety of subjects ranging from adjudication to maritime law, both in France and abroad, Judge Potocki was recently a guest speaker at Harvard Law School.

== Other activities ==
- Cahiers de la justice, Editor-in-Chief (2008-2010)
- "Law and Justice Research Task Force" (research centre of the French Ministry of Justice, in partnership with the National Scientific Research Centre (CNRS)), Member of the Scientific Board (2006)
- Institute of International Transport Law (IDIT), Member of the Administrative Board (2010)
