= Antonio Saggio =

Antonio Saggio (19 February 1934 in Naples – 26 January 2010 in Rome) was an Italian judge and legal scholar.

== Legal career ==
Antonio Saggio was born in Naples on 19 February 1934. He received a degree in Law from the University of Naples, with a thesis in international law entitled "War of Peoples or of Armies?" Beginning his career as a magistrate, he was quickly appointed Judge of the Ordinary Courts (first instance). In 1973, he was appointed to the Court of Appeals and from 1974 to 1978 he provided counsel to the Legal Office of the Minister of Justice. In 1980, he was appointed to the Rome Court of Cassation (last instance) Research Office of the Constitutional Court where he reviewed and prepared briefs and provided counsel to the sitting court. From 1988 to 1989, he served as a member of the Council of Advisors to the Chief Justice. In 2001, he was appointed Chief Justice of the Court of Cassation Civil Division I, a position he held through 2005.

=== International Law and Negotiations ===
From 1977 to 1978, he represented the Government of Italy in the negotiations to conclude an agreement on the extradition of persons accused of crimes of terrorism (Conferences of Copenhagen, Brussels and London). In 1978, he represented the Government of Italy in the United Nations Committee for the examination of the Convention on Terrorism and Hijacking. From 1985 to 1988, he served as Chairman of a group installed by the Permanent Council of the European Union that successfully negotiated a Convention on Jurisdiction and Enforcement of Civil and Commercial Judgments. In 1988, he takes part in the Diplomatic Conference of Lugano that adopts the Convention.

=== Court of Justice of the European Court of Justice ===
From 1979 to 1984, he was at the Court of Justice of the European Union as rapporteur of the Advocate General. From 1989 to 1995, he was Judge at the Court of First Instance (now the General Court of the European Union), serving as its Presiding Justice from 1995 to 1998. In March 1998, he was designated Advocate General at the Court of Justice of the European Union, an office he held until 2000.

=== Scholarship and Academics ===
He held positions as Full and Visiting Professor at a number of universities in Italy and abroad: the University of Macerata Department of Commercial Law, the University of Naples Department of International Organizations Law, the National University of Somalia, the University of Naples School of European and International Law, and the National University of Public Administration in Rome. Through his experience and scholarship on the bench and in academia, he developed and pursued a keen interest on undercurrents and dynamic forces at work in the field of law, particularly European law, which is revealed in numerous essays and publications over the course of his career.

== Legacy ==
To honor his memory and contributions to legal scholarship, the Antonio Saggio Prize was established in 2015 with support from the Spinelli Institute and the Municipality of Ventotene. The presentation ceremony of the annual award takes place in Ventotene, the island where Antonio Saggio and his family spent their summers.

== Publications ==
- I civili come soggetti della violenza bellica [Civilians as victims of wartime violence], Naples, 1971. (in Italian).
- In tema di prova delle condizioni di efficacia delle sentenze straniere, in: Rivista di diritto internazionale privato e processuale, 1971, p. 385 (in Italian).
- Costituzione e cittadino [On the constitution and the citizen], in: Storia d’Italia, vol. V, Einaudi, Turin, 1973. (in Italian; published alias Joseph Filangi).
- Orientamenti della Corte di giustizia delle Comunità europee in materia di illeciti economici [Guidelines of the Court of Justice of the European Communities in matters relating to illegal proceeds], in: Il Consiglio superiore della magistratura, 3/1983, p. 93 (in Italian).
- La circolazione delle persone nella CEE [The circulation of people in the EEC], in Quaderni della giustizia, n. 8/1984, p. 11 (In Italian).
- Diritto interno e fonti comunitarie [Domestic law and EU sources], in: Quaderni della giustizia, n. 43/1985, p. 12 (in Italian).
- Affidamento di opere pubbliche e normativa comunitaria [Awarding of public works contracts and Community legislation], in: Rivista di diritto europeo, 1985, p. 34 (in Italian)
- Ripetizione dell’indebito e diritto comunitario [Recovery of overpayments and Community law], in Il Corriere giuridico, n. 7/1985, p. 757 (in Italian)
- Iniziative sullo spazio giudiziario europeo in materia civile [Initiatives on the limits of European jurisdiction in civil matters], in Quaderni della giustizia, n. 59/1986, p. 26 (in Italian).
- Italian experiences in application of Article 177 in the EEC treaty, in Article 177 of EEC: experience and problems.
- Aspetti problematici della competenza pregiudiziale della Corte di giustizia delle Comunità europee messi in luce nella giurisprudenza, [Judicial discretion of the Court of Justice evidenced in case-law)] in Rivista di diritto europeo. 1987, p. 179 (in Italian)
- Spazio giudiziario europeo in materia civile: sviluppi recenti [European judicial jurisdiction in civil matters: recent developments], in Documenti giustizia, 1988, p. 51 ss. (in Italian).
- Il completamento del mercato interno e la scadenza del '92 [Completion of the internal market and the 1992 deadlines], in Il Corriere giuridico, 1988, p. 967 (in Italian).
- Il Tribunale comunitario di primo grado, in Diritto comunitario e degli scambi internazionali [The Community Court of First Instance, Community law, and international trade], 1988, p. 611 (in Italian).
- L'incidenza del diritto comunitario sul diritto del lavoro in Italia [The impact of Community law on labor law in Italy], in: Il foro italiano, 1989, IV, cc. 14 ss. (in Italian, coauthored with R. Foglia).
- Il giudice comunitario nel contesto attuale: natura del ruolo e novità istituzionali [The Community Court in the present context: nature of the role and institutional innovations], in Documenti giustizia, 1990, cc. 12 (in Italian).
- Le basi giuridiche della politica ambientale nell'ordinamento comunitario dopo l’entrata in vigore dell'Atto unico [Legal bases of Community environmental policy after the entry into force of the Single Act], in Rivista di diritto europeo, 1990, p. 39 (in Italian)
- Orientamenti della Corte di giustizia delle Comunità europee in materia brevettuale [Guidelines of the Court of Justice of the European Communities in matters related to patents], in Rivista di diritto europeo. 1990, p. 581 ss. (in Italian).
- Rapports entre droit communautaire et droit constitutionnel anglais [Relationship between Community law and the English constitutional law], in Journal of European Law, 1991, p. 327 ss. (in French)
- European Judicial Area for Civil and Commercial Matters: the Brussels and Lugano Conventions, in Journal of European Law, 1991, p. 617 ss.
- Prospettive di evoluzione del Tribunale di primo grado delle Comunità europee [Potential developments of the Court of First Instance of the European Communities], in Rivista di diritto europeo, 1992, p. 3 (in Italian).
- Le système de promotion des fonctionnaires des Communautés européennes: réflexions sur certaines orientations de la jurisprudence [The system of promotion of the professional staff of the European Community: reflections on some legal perspectives]. (in French).
- Problemi giuridici relativi alto spazio economico europeo, con particolare riferimento al trasporto aereo, [Legal issues affecting the European economic area, with particular reference to air transport] in Diritto del commercio internazionale, 1993, p. 61 (in Italian).
- La protezione dei diritti fondamentali nell'ordinamento comunitario [Protecting basic rights in the EU], in Documenti Giustizia, 1993, cc. 275 (in Italian).
- Le competenze [Duties and Responsibilities], in Il Tribunale di primo grado della Comunità, a cura di Umberto Leanza, Pasquale Paone, Antonio Saggio, Napoli 1994, pp. 69–97. (in Italian).
- Efficacia di sentenze ed atti stranieri, in Il nuovo sistema italiano di diritto internazionale privato [Effectiveness of foreign judgments and acts], in Il Corriere giuridico, 1995, p. 1259 (in Italian only; with comments from Francesco Capotorti).
- Competenze rispettive delle autorità comunitarie e nazionali in materia di controllo e repressione delle attività anticoncorrenziali delle impresse [Powers of the Community and national authorities in controlling and suppressing anti-competitive activities of enterprises], in Quaderni di ricerca giuridica delta consulenza legale della Banca d’Italia, n. 43, December 1996, pp. 186–209. (in Italian).
- Diritto internazionale privato e diritto uniforme nel sistema comunitario [Private international law and uniform law in the Community framework], in Rivista di Diritto europeo, n. 2/1996, pp. 215–233. (in Italian).
- L'incidence de l’accord EEE sur le système communautaire [The impact of the EEA Accord on the community system], in Rivista di diritto europeo, n. 3/1996. (in French).
- Riflessioni sulla legge italiana di riforma del diritto internazionale privato e sulla sua incidenza sul regime dello stato civile [Reflections on the Italy’s reform of private international law and its effect on the rules of civil status], in Documenti Giustizia, 1997, n. 1-2, pp. 13–28. (in Italian).
- Euroopan ylueisöjen ensimäisen oikeusasteen tuomioistuimen kilpailuasioita koskevasta oikeuskäytännöstä [La pratique du Tribunal de première instance des Communautés européennes en matière de droit de la concurrence]. Defensor in legis, n. 1/1997, pp. 103–118. (in Finnish)
- Appunti sulla ricevibilità dei ricorsi d’annullamento proposti da persone fisiche e giuridiche in base all'articolo 173, quarto comma, del trattato CE [Notes on the admissibility of annulment actions brought by natural and legal persons under Article 173, fourth paragraph, of the EC Treaty], in La tutela giurisdizionale dei diritti nel Sistema comunitario, Brussels 1997, pp. 107– 126. (in Italian).
- Le informazioni riservate ed i segreti commerciali nel diritto comunitario della concorrenza [Confidential information and trade secrets in Community competition law], in Rivista di Diritto Europeo, 1997, p 547 ss. (in Italian, co-authored with C. Iannone).
- The activisme judiciaire dans l'espace communautaire: son rôle dans l'intégration européenne et ses limites [Judicial activism in the community area: its role and limits in European integration], in: studies iuridica, n. 38, Universidade de Coimbra, Colloquia -1, 1999, p. 83. (In French).
- Note di commento alla giurisprudenza della corte di giustizia delle Comunità europee pubblicate (dal 1986 al 2001) [Commentary on the case law of the Court of Justice of the European Communities published (from 1986 to 2001)] (in Italian, co-edited with R. Foglia; in the bimonthly section "the Observatory of the Court of Justice of the European Union" in “il Corriere giuridico”)
- La responsabilità dello Stato per violazioni del Diritto Comunitario [State liability for breaches of Community law], in Atti del XLXI Convegno di studi di scienze dell’Amministrazione, Milan 2001, pp 219–273 (in Italian).
- Influenza della giurisprudenza della Corte di Giustizia CE sulle norme processuali nazionali [ Influence of the European Court of Justice EC on national procedural standards], in Corriere giuridico, 2001. (in Italian).
