= Nicholas Forwood =

British barrister and former judge

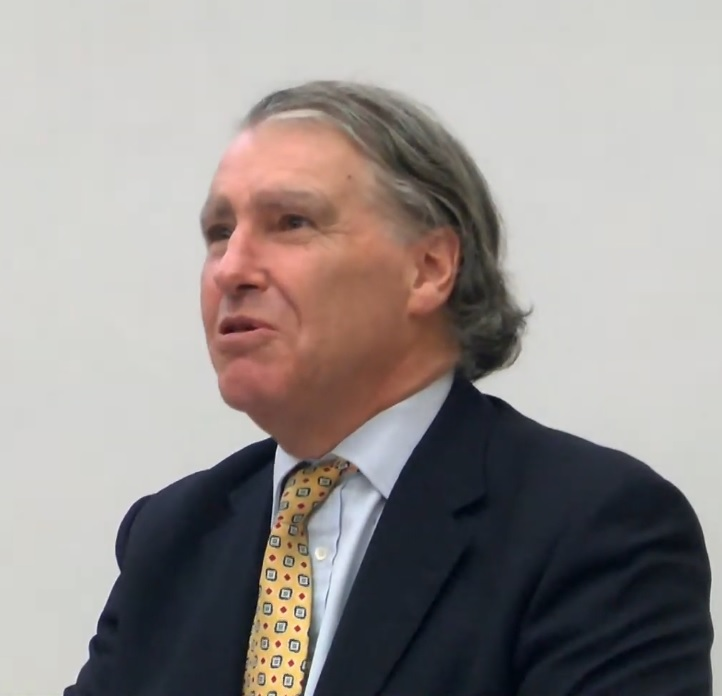
Forwood in 2013

Sir Nicholas James Forwood, KC (born 1948) is a British barrister and former judge.

== Early life and education ==
Born in 1948, Forwood is the son of an army officer. He attended the independent Stowe School and then (from 1966) St John's College, Cambridge, where he read mechanical sciences for part 1 of the Tripos and placed in the first class; he switched to law for part 2 and placed in the second class. He graduated in 1969.

== Career ==
Forwood was called to the bar at the Middle Temple in 1970. He practised as a barrister in London between 1971 and 1979, when he established a chambers in Brussels specialising in European Economic Community and competition law. He was called to the Irish Bar in 1981 In the United Kingdom, he was appointed Queen's Counsel in 1987.

In December 1999, Forwood was sworn as a Judge in the Court of First Instance of the European Communities, which became the General Court of the Court of Justice of the European Union. He served as a judge on the court until 2015.

Forwood has been a door tenant at Brick Court Chambers since 2015. He has also been a part-time counsel at White & Case since 2016.

== Honours and awards ==
Forwood was a bencher of the Middle Temple in 1998. In the 2016 New Year Honours, he was knighted for "services to European justice".
