= Anna Marcoulli =

Cypriot Judge of the General Court (born 1974)

Judge of the General Court (European Union)
- Incumbent
- Assumed office 2016

Personal details
- Born: 1974 (age 51–52)
- Education: University of East Anglia (LLB); University of Bristol (LLM)

Anna Marcoulli (born 1974) is a Cypriot Judge of the General Court (European Union).

She was educated at the University of East Anglia (LLB, 1995) and the University of Bristol (LLM, 1996).
