= Nils Wahl =

Swedish jurist and lawyer

Judge of the European Court of Justice
- In office 7 October 2019 – 7 October 2024
- Preceded by: Carl Gustav Fernlund
- Succeeded by: Fredrik Schalin

General Advocate of the European Court of Justice
- In office 28 November 2012 – 7 October 2019

Personal details
- Born: 31 January 1961 (age 65) Stockholm, Sweden
- Spouse: Marianne Wahl
- Children: 2 daughters

Nils Robert Wahl (born 31 January 1961 in Stockholm) is a Swedish jurist, lawyer, and former judge of the European Court of Justice in 2019 to 2024. He was a judge at the Tribunal from 2006 to 2012, and was the and Advocate General at the Court from 2012 to 2019.

== Biography ==
Wahl was born in Stockholm in 1961. He earned an LL.M. in 1987 and a PhD in 1995 from the Stockholm University. Wahl defended the thesis "Competition conditions: on the relationship between EC competition law and national competition law" in 1994. He was installed as professor of European integration law in 2001.

Wahl has had several assignments as an expert in competition law, including the fight against cartels and review of Swedish competition legislation. He participated in the investigative work before Sweden's entry into the EU and was a member of the Council for Competition until it was dissolved. Wahl was CEO of the Foundation for Faculty Courses at Stockholm University between 1993 and 2004.

At the 2001 legal meeting, he was awarded the Tore Almén prize for the work "Competitive damage. Liability for damages in the event of a breach of EC competition rules and the Swedish Competition Act."

On 27 April 2006, the government announced that it had nominated Wahl as a new Swedish judge at the tribunal within the European Court of Justice. On 25 April 2012, he was appointed Advocate General by the representatives of the governments of the Member States for the period from 7 October 2012 to 6 October 2018. On 28 November 2012, he took his oath as Advocate General before the Court.

In 2019, Wahl was appointed as a judge in the European Court of Justice, and took oath to the court on 7 October.

== Family ==
He lives at Hadeholm's manor outside Gävle with his wife Marianne Wahl. They have two daughters.
