= European Union Civil Service Tribunal =

Civil Service Tribunal
(in other official languages)
Bulgarian	Съд на публичната служба
Czech	Soud pro veřejnou službu
Danish	Personaleretten
German	Gericht für den öffentlichen Dienst
Greek	Δικαστήριο Δημόσιας Διοίκησης
Spanish	Tribunal de la Función Pública
Estonian	Avaliku Teenistuse Kohus
Finnish	Virkamiestuomioistuin
French	Tribunal de la fonction publique
Croatian	Službenički sud
Hungarian	Közszolgálati Törvényszék
Italian	Tribunale della funzione pubblica
Lithuanian	Tarnautojų teismas
Latvian	Civildienesta tiesa
Maltese	It-Tribunal għas-Servizz Pubbliku
Dutch	Gerecht voor ambtenarenzaken
Polish	Sąd do spraw Służby Publicznej
Portuguese	Tribunal da Função Pública
Romanian	Tribunalul Funcției Publice
Slovak	Súd pre verejnú službu
Slovene	Sodišče za uslužbence
Swedish	Personaldomstolen
- Established: 2005
- Dissolved: 2016
- Jurisdiction: European Union
- Location: Luxembourg
- Appeals to: General Court
- Number of positions: 7
- Website: Official website

President
- Currently: Dissolved
- Since: 2016

The European Union Civil Service Tribunal was a specialised court within the Court of Justice of the European Union. It was established on 2 December 2005. It ceased to exist on 1 September 2016.

== Legal basis ==
The Treaty of Nice provides for the creation of judicial panels in certain specific areas. This provision is later amended and codified in Article 257 ("specialised courts") of the Treaty on the Functioning of the European Union by the Treaty of Lisbon:

The European Parliament and the Council, acting in accordance with the ordinary legislative procedure, may establish specialised courts attached to the General Court to hear and determine at first instance certain classes of action or proceeding brought in specific areas. The European Parliament and the Council shall act by means of regulations either on a proposal from the Commission after consultation of the Court of Justice or at the request of the Court of Justice after consultation of the Commission. [...]

The Council of the European Union on 2 November 2004, adopted on that basis a decision establishing the European Union Civil Service Tribunal. The new specialised court, composed of seven judges, was called upon to adjudicate in disputes between the European Union and its civil service, a jurisdiction until 2005 was exercised by the General Court. Its decisions was subject to appeal on questions of law only to the General Court and, in exceptional cases, to review by the European Court of Justice. It was established on 2 December 2005. It was dissolved on 1 September 2016, despite the success in its mandate, in favour of doubling the size of the General Court.

=== Presidents of the Civil Service Tribunal ===
Year	Presidents of the Civil Service Tribunal
2005–2011	(United Kingdom) Paul J. Mahoney
2011–2016	(Belgium) Sean Van Raepenbusch

== Judges on the Civil Service Tribunal in 2016 ==
Judge since	Member state	Members of the Civil Service Tribunal
2011-2016	Belgium	Sean Van Raepenbusch
2011-2016	Italy	Ezio Perillo
2011-2016	Netherlands	René Barents
2011-2016	Ireland	Kieran Bradley
2013-2016	Denmark	Jesper Svenningsen
2016-2016	Portugal	João Sant'Anna
2016-2016	Bulgaria	Alexander Kornezov
