= Jan Passer =

Czech jurist

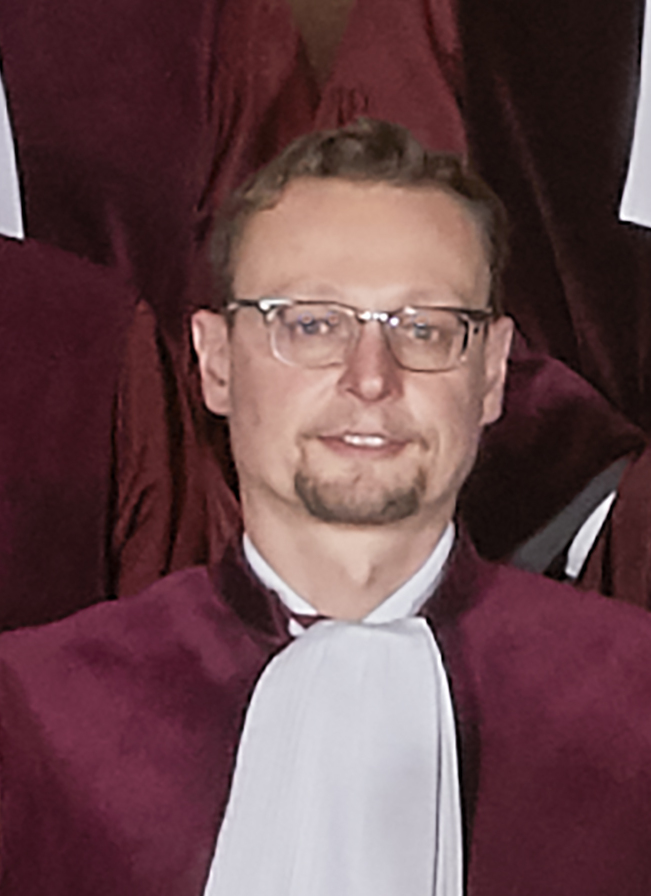

Judge of the European Court of Justice
- Incumbent
- Assumed office 16 September 2016

Personal details
- Born: Jan M. Passer; 1974 (age 51–52) Prague, Czechoslovakia

Jan M. Passer (born in 1974) is a Czech jurist. He has been a Judge at the European Court of Justice since 2016.

== Biography ==
Passer was born in Prague in 1974.

He studied law at the Faculty of Law of Charles University in 1997, at the Faculty of Law of Stockholm University (LL.M. in 2000). He has a Doctor of Laws in 2007.

In 2001, he worked as a judge of the District Court for Prague 2. From 2004, he was a trainee judge and from 2005, a regular judge of the Supreme Administrative Court, where for a certain period, he worked, among other things, as the chairman of the electoral senate.

In February 2016, he was selected as a candidate for the position of judge of the Tribunal of the Court of Justice of the European Union; he became a member of the Tribunal as the second Czech judge after Irena Pelikánová on September 19 of the same year.

He was appointed to the European Court of Justice from 6 October 2020 to 6 October 2024 where he replaced Jiří Malenovský. Passer was reappointed for a full six-year term from 7 October 2024 to 6 October 2030 in November 2023.
