= Marc van der Woude =

Dutch judge and professor (born 1960)

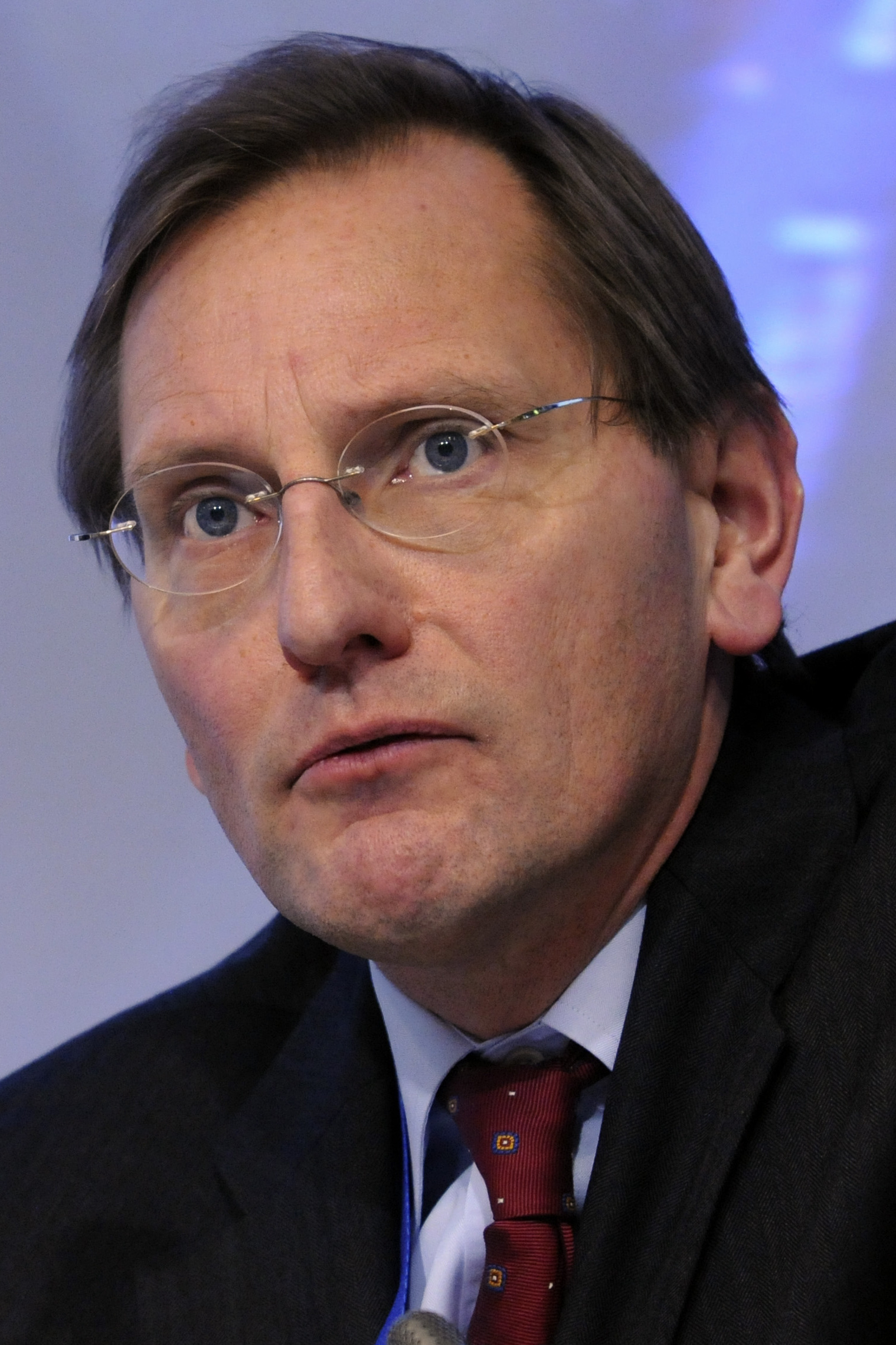
Marc van der Woude in 2012.

Marc H. van der Woude (born 1960) is a Dutch jurist and judge in the General Court of the European Union (EU) from 2010 until 2026. He was president of the General Court from 2019 until 2026.

A native of Gorredijk, Friesland, Van der Woude studied law at the University of Groningen (until 1983) and the College of Europe in Belgium (1983–1984 promotion). He later lectured at the College of Europe and Leiden University. He worked as an attorney in Brussels from 1995, becoming a professor at Erasmus University Rotterdam in 2000. Van der Woude was appointed an EU General Court judge in Luxembourg City in 2010 and elected as its president in 2019. He was reelected for a second three-year term in 2022. He previously served as vice president from 2016 until 2019.
