= Court of Justice of the European Union =

Institution of the European Union

Coordinates: 49°37′12″N 6°08′22″E

- Emblem of the Court of Justice of the European Union

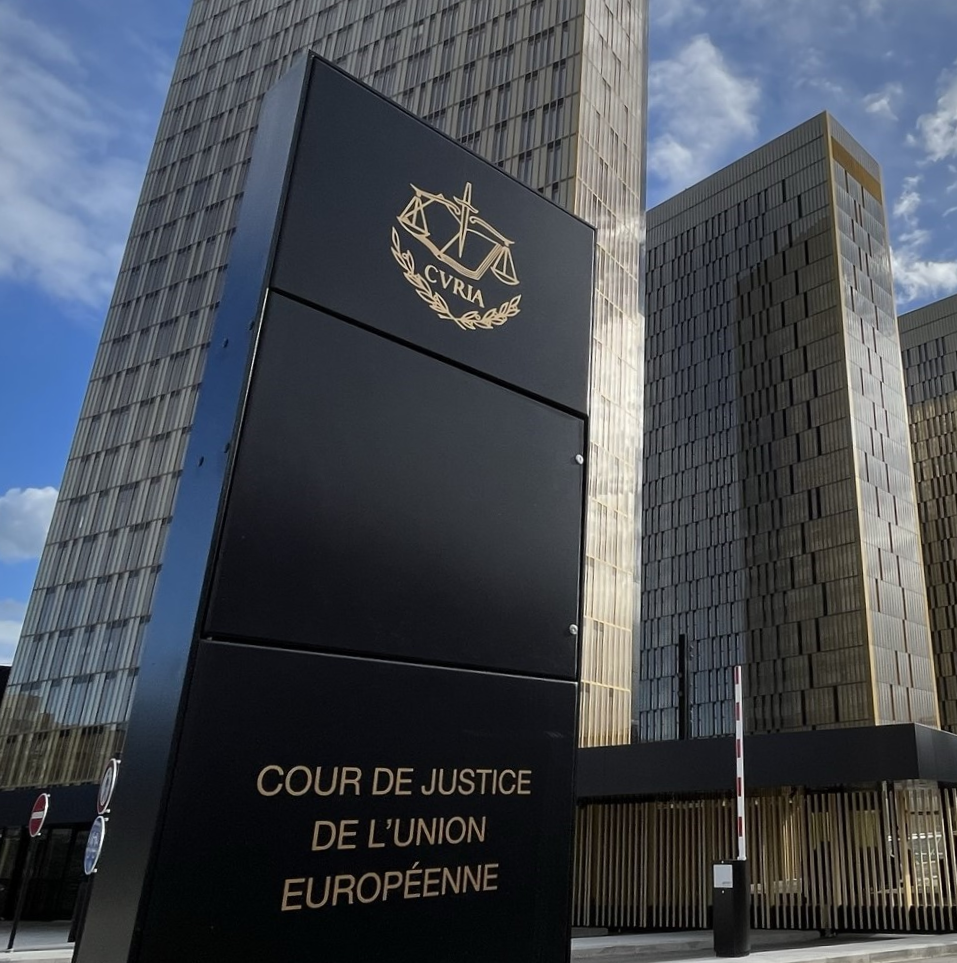
- Palais de la Cour de Justice, Luxembourg

Judicial branch overview
- Formed: 1952
- Jurisdiction: European Union and Northern Ireland (Note: Under the terms of the Protocol on Ireland/Northern Ireland, concluded as part of the Brexit withdrawal agreement, the CJEU continues to have jurisdiction over the operation of EU law applying to Northern Ireland in relation to customs and the movement of goods, technical regulations, VAT and excise, the Single Electricity Market and State aid, and may hear applications for preliminary rulings made by Northern Irish courts.)
- Headquarters: Palais de la Cour de Justice, Kirchberg, Luxembourg City, Luxembourg
- Child agencies: Court of Justice; General Court; Civil Service Tribunal (2005–2016)

The Court of Justice of the European Union (CJEU, French: Cour de justice de l'Union européenne or "CJUE"; Latin: Curia) is the judicial branch of the European Union (EU). Seated in the Kirchberg district of Luxembourg City, Luxembourg, this EU institution consists of two separate courts: the Court of Justice and the General Court. From 2005 to 2016, it also contained the Civil Service Tribunal. It has a sui generis court system, meaning 'of its own kind', and is a supranational institution.

The CJEU is the chief judicial authority of the EU and oversees the uniform application and interpretation of European Union law, in co-operation with the national judiciary of the EU member states. CJEU also resolves legal disputes between national governments and EU institutions, and may take action against EU institutions on behalf of individuals, companies, or organisations whose rights have been infringed.

== Composition ==
The CJEU consists of two major courts:

1. the Court of Justice, informally known as European Court of Justice (ECJ), has the competence to hear applications from national courts for preliminary rulings on the interpretation of EU law, direct actions against EU member states for failure to fulfil an obligation, direct actions against EU institutions for annulment and for failure to act, as well as to hear appeals on points of law in rulings and orders of the General Court. The Court of Justice is composed of one judge from each EU member state (currently 27), assisted by 11 Advocates General. If assigned to a case, an Advocate General prepares an independent, non-binding opinion to assist the court in its deliberations.
2. the General Court, known prior to the Treaty of Lisbon as the Court of First Instance, has the competence to hear actions brought by natural or legal persons against acts of EU institutions and agencies, actions brought by EU member states against the Commission or Council, actions for damages caused by EU institutions or agencies, actions relating to intellectual property, actions relating to employment and social security disputes between EU institutions and their staff, as well as limited applications from national courts for preliminary rulings. The General Court is composed of two judges from each EU member state (currently 54), though only 53 seats are currently filled.

Judges and Advocates General are appointed for a "renewable 6-year term, jointly by national governments".

== Function ==
The CJEU's specific mission is to ensure that "the law is observed" "in the interpretation and application" of the Treaties of the European Union. To achieve this, it:

- reviews the legality of actions taken by the EU's institutions;
- enforces compliance by member states with their obligations under the Treaties, and
- interprets European Union law.

The composition and functioning of the courts are regulated by the Rules of Procedure.

== History ==
The CJEU was originally established in 1951 as a single court called the Court of Justice of the European Coal and Steel Communities. With the Euratom and the European Economic Community in 1957 its name changed to the Court of Justice of the European Communities (CJEC). In 1988 the Court requested the Commission to create a Court of First Instance and in 2004 it added the Civil Service Tribunal, which dealt with cases regarding EU staffers. The Tribunal was later terminated and its competence moved to the Court of First Instance, renamed "General Court".

The Treaty of Lisbon in 2009 renamed the court system to the "Court of Justice of the European Union" and renamed the CJEC to the "Court of Justice".

The working language of the Court of Justice of the European Union is French.

== Legal interpretation ==
The Court of Justice of the European Union embraces the substantive equality interpretation of the European Union anti-discrimination law.

== See also ==
- Primacy of European Union law
- European Parliament in Luxembourg
