= List of prosecutors general of Spain =

Badge of Spanish Prosecutors

This is a list of the Spanish people that have served as prosecutor (or attorney) general since the 19th century and, as such, head of the Prosecution Ministry.

== Introduction ==
The position was originally titled 'Prosecutor of the Supreme Court' (Spanish: Fiscal del Tribunal Supremo), being the successor to the Prosecutor of the Council of Castile. During the Second Republic (1931–1939) it was renamed as 'Prosecutor General of the Republic' (Spanish: Fiscal General de la República) and, during the Spanish transition to democracy (1976–1978), it was known as 'Prosecutor of the Realm' (Spanish: Fiscal del Reino). Since the approval of the Spanish Constitution of 1978, the position is named 'Prosecutor General of the State' (Spanish: Fiscal General del Estado).

Before the 1844, there was more than one Prosecutor of the Supreme Court. Decree CLII of 17 April 1812 abolished the councils and created the Supreme Court with two prosecutors. Later, Decree II of 25 March 1834 re-established the Supreme Court with three prosecutors. Royal Decree of 26 April 1844 simplified the Prosecutor's Office of the Supreme Court, reducing it to a single chief prosecutor. This reorganization was completed on 2 July 1844, when Joaquín Francisco Pacheco was dismissed and Pedro Jiménez Navarro became the sole head of the Prosecution Ministry.

== List of chief prosecutors from 1812 to 1823 ==
The Spanish Constitution of 1812 was in force from 1812 to 1814 and from 1820 to 1823. During these periods, the Supreme Court was operational and had a Public Prosecutor's Office with two chief prosecutors.

According to the journal Kalendario manual y guía de forasteros en Madrid (1744–1837), these were the prosecutors:

- Ramón López-Pelegrín Martínez (1812–1814)
- Miguel de Eyzaguirre (1812–1814)
- Ramón López-Pelegrín Martínez (1820–1821)
- Ramón Feliu (1820–1821)
- Juan de la Dehesa (1821–1823)
- Manuel de Encina (1821–1823)

== List of chief prosecutors from 1834 to 1844 ==
- Francisco Entrambasaguas y Montalvo (April 1834 – September 1840)
- Andrés Crespo Cantolla (April 1834 – September 1840)
- Juan Nepomuceno San Miguel (April 1834 – September 1835)
- Santiago Tejada y Santamaría (15 September 1835 – 15 October 1836)
- José Alonso Ruiz de Conejares (12 November 1836 – 2 November 1840)
- Joaquín María López y López (4 November 1840 – June 1841)
- Pío Laborda y Galindo (16 November 1840 – 29 July 1843)
- Eugenio Manuel Cuervo y Pérez (12 July 1842 – 29 July 1843)
- Joaquín Francisco Pacheco (29 July 1843 – 2 July 1844)
- Felipe Gómez Acebo (31 July 1843 – 9 August 1843)
- Pedro Jiménez Navarro (next list)

=== Timeline ===
Since there was more than one prosecutor during this decade, a timeline is provided that visually reflects the situation.

== List of chief prosecutors since 1844 ==
For the purpose of this list, the date used is the date on which the decree of appointment or dismissal received royal assent, which may differ from the date of publication or of the effective taking of office.

Denotes a Lieutenant Prosecutor serving as Acting Prosecutor General.

Name	Start	End	Duration	Party	Government		Ref.
Pedro Jiménez Navarro (1782–1852)	9 December 1843	14 January 1845	1 year, 36 days	Moderate	Luis González Bravo	Isabella II (1833–1868)	
Pedro Jiménez Navarro (1782–1852)	9 December 1843	14 January 1845	1 year, 36 days	Moderate	The Duke of Valencia	Isabella II (1833–1868)	
Joaquín Francisco Pacheco (1808–1865)	14 January 1845	4 December 1846	1 year, 324 days	Moderate	The Duke of Valencia	Isabella II (1833–1868)	
Joaquín Francisco Pacheco (1808–1865)	14 January 1845	4 December 1846	1 year, 324 days	Moderate	The Marquess of Miraflores	Isabella II (1833–1868)	
Joaquín Francisco Pacheco (1808–1865)	14 January 1845	4 December 1846	1 year, 324 days	Moderate	The Duke of Valencia	Isabella II (1833–1868)	
Joaquín Francisco Pacheco (1808–1865)	14 January 1845	4 December 1846	1 year, 324 days	Moderate	Francisco Javier de Istúriz	Isabella II (1833–1868)	
Manuel Ruiz Alonso (?–1849)	4 December 1846	5 February 1847	63 days	Non-partisan	Francisco Javier de Istúriz	Isabella II (1833–1868)	
Manuel Ruiz Alonso (?–1849)	4 December 1846	5 February 1847	63 days	Non-partisan	The Marquess of Casa Irujo	Isabella II (1833–1868)	
Joaquín Francisco Pacheco (1808–1865)	5 February 1847	28 March 1847	51 days	Moderate	The Marquess of Casa Irujo	Isabella II (1833–1868)	
Manuel Ruiz Alonso (?–1849)	28 March 1847	16 April 1847	19 days	Non-partisan	Joaquín Francisco Pacheco	Isabella II (1833–1868)	
Lorenzo Arrazola y García (1795–1873)	16 April 1847	4 October 1847	171 days	Moderate	Joaquín Francisco Pacheco	Isabella II (1833–1868)	
Lorenzo Arrazola y García (1795–1873)	16 April 1847	4 October 1847	171 days	Moderate	Florencio García Goyena	Isabella II (1833–1868)	
Manuel Ruiz Alonso (?–1849)	4 October 1847	19 December 1848	1 year, 76 days	Non-partisan	The Duke of Valencia	Isabella II (1833–1868)	
Joaquín José Casaus (1793–1885)	19 December 1848	10 January 1851	2 years, 22 days	Moderate	The Duke of Valencia	Isabella II (1833–1868)	
Joaquín José Casaus (1793–1885)	19 December 1848	10 January 1851	2 years, 22 days	Moderate	The Count of Clonard	Isabella II (1833–1868)	
Joaquín José Casaus (1793–1885)	19 December 1848	10 January 1851	2 years, 22 days	Moderate	The Duke of Valencia	Isabella II (1833–1868)	
José María Huet (1804–1868)	10 January 1851	25 August 1854	3 years, 227 days	Moderate	The Duke of Valencia	Isabella II (1833–1868)	
José María Huet (1804–1868)	10 January 1851	25 August 1854	3 years, 227 days	Moderate	Juan Bravo Murillo	Isabella II (1833–1868)	
José María Huet (1804–1868)	10 January 1851	25 August 1854	3 years, 227 days	Moderate	The Count of Alcoy	Isabella II (1833–1868)	
José María Huet (1804–1868)	10 January 1851	25 August 1854	3 years, 227 days	Moderate	Francisco de Lersundi y Hormaechea	Isabella II (1833–1868)	
José María Huet (1804–1868)	10 January 1851	25 August 1854	3 years, 227 days	Moderate	The Count of San Luis	Isabella II (1833–1868)	
José María Huet (1804–1868)	10 January 1851	25 August 1854	3 years, 227 days	Moderate	The Marquess of Mendigorría	Isabella II (1833–1868)	
José María Huet (1804–1868)	10 January 1851	25 August 1854	3 years, 227 days	Moderate	The Duke of Rivas	Isabella II (1833–1868)	
José María Huet (1804–1868)	10 January 1851	25 August 1854	3 years, 227 days	Moderate	The Prince of Vergara	Isabella II (1833–1868)	
Pedro Gómez de la Serna (1806–1871)	25 August 1854	17 October 1856	2 years, 53 days	Progressive	The Prince of Vergara	Isabella II (1833–1868)	
Pedro Gómez de la Serna (1806–1871)	25 August 1854	17 October 1856	2 years, 53 days	Progressive	The Duke of Tetuán	Isabella II (1833–1868)	
Pedro Gómez de la Serna (1806–1871)	25 August 1854	17 October 1856	2 years, 53 days	Progressive	The Duke of Valencia	Isabella II (1833–1868)	
Pedro Gómez de la Serna (1806–1871)	25 August 1854	17 October 1856	2 years, 53 days	Progressive	The Marquess of Nervión	Isabella II (1833–1868)	
Antonio María Asensio y Bonel	17 October 1856	24 October 1856	7 days	Non-partisan	The Marquess of Nervión	Isabella II (1833–1868)	
Joaquín José Casaus (1793–1885)	24 October 1856	25 October 1857	1 year, 1 day	Moderate	The Marquess of Nervión	Isabella II (1833–1868)	
Antonio María Asensio y Bonel	25 October 1857	30 October 1857	5 days	Non-partisan	The Marquess of Nervión	Isabella II (1833–1868)	
Manuel Seijas Lozano (1800–1868)	30 October 1857	28 March 1862	4 years, 149 days	Moderate	The Marquess of Nervión	Isabella II (1833–1868)	
Manuel Seijas Lozano (1800–1868)	30 October 1857	28 March 1862	4 years, 149 days	Moderate	Francisco Javier de Istúriz	Isabella II (1833–1868)	
Manuel Seijas Lozano (1800–1868)	30 October 1857	28 March 1862	4 years, 149 days	Moderate	The Duke of Tetuán	Isabella II (1833–1868)	
Antonio Corzo y Granado	28 March 1862	23 July 1869	7 years, 117 days	Non-partisan	The Duke of Tetuán	Isabella II (1833–1868)	
Antonio Corzo y Granado	28 March 1862	23 July 1869	7 years, 117 days	Non-partisan	The Marquess of Miraflores	Isabella II (1833–1868)	
Antonio Corzo y Granado	28 March 1862	23 July 1869	7 years, 117 days	Non-partisan	Lorenzo Arrazola y García	Isabella II (1833–1868)	
Antonio Corzo y Granado	28 March 1862	23 July 1869	7 years, 117 days	Non-partisan	Alejandro Mon y Menéndez	Isabella II (1833–1868)	
Antonio Corzo y Granado	28 March 1862	23 July 1869	7 years, 117 days	Non-partisan	The Duke of Valencia	Isabella II (1833–1868)	
Antonio Corzo y Granado	28 March 1862	23 July 1869	7 years, 117 days	Non-partisan	The Duke of Tetuán	Isabella II (1833–1868)	
Antonio Corzo y Granado	28 March 1862	23 July 1869	7 years, 117 days	Non-partisan	The Duke of Valencia†	Isabella II (1833–1868)	
Antonio Corzo y Granado	28 March 1862	23 July 1869	7 years, 117 days	Non-partisan	Luis González Bravo	Isabella II (1833–1868)	
Antonio Corzo y Granado	28 March 1862	23 July 1869	7 years, 117 days	Non-partisan	The Marquess of Havana	Isabella II (1833–1868)	
Antonio Corzo y Granado	28 March 1862	23 July 1869	7 years, 117 days	Non-partisan	The Duke of the Tower	The Duke of the Tower (regent) (1869–1871)	
Antonio Corzo y Granado	28 March 1862	23 July 1869	7 years, 117 days	Non-partisan	The Marquess of Castillejos	The Duke of the Tower (regent) (1869–1871)	
Fernando Pérez de Rozas	23 July 1869	17 September 1869	56 days	Non-partisan	The Marquess of Castillejos	The Duke of the Tower (regent) (1869–1871)	
Juan Manuel González Acevedo (1806–1880)	17 September 1869	27 June 1870	283 days	Non-partisan	The Marquess of Castillejos	The Duke of the Tower (regent) (1869–1871)	
Eugenio Díez Pedreño (1798–1877)	27 June 1870	9 December 1871	1 year, 165 days	Liberal Unionist	The Marquess of Castillejos	Amadeo I (1871–1873)	
Eugenio Díez Pedreño (1798–1877)	27 June 1870	9 December 1871	1 year, 165 days	Liberal Unionist	Juan Bautista Topete	Amadeo I (1871–1873)	
Eugenio Díez Pedreño (1798–1877)	27 June 1870	9 December 1871	1 year, 165 days	Liberal Unionist	The Duke of the Tower	Amadeo I (1871–1873)	
Eugenio Díez Pedreño (1798–1877)	27 June 1870	9 December 1871	1 year, 165 days	Liberal Unionist	Manuel Ruiz Zorrilla	Amadeo I (1871–1873)	
Eugenio Díez Pedreño (1798–1877)	27 June 1870	9 December 1871	1 year, 165 days	Liberal Unionist	The Marquess of San Rafael	Amadeo I (1871–1873)	
Joaquín Ruiz Cañabate	9 December 1871	17 January 1872	39 days	Non-partisan	The Marquess of San Rafael	Amadeo I (1871–1873)	
Joaquín Ruiz Cañabate	9 December 1871	17 January 1872	39 days	Non-partisan	Práxedes Mateo Sagasta	Amadeo I (1871–1873)	
Pascual Bayarri García (1812–1876)	17 January 1872	10 August 1872	206 days	Non-partisan	Práxedes Mateo Sagasta	Amadeo I (1871–1873)	
Pascual Bayarri García (1812–1876)	17 January 1872	10 August 1872	206 days	Non-partisan	The Duke of the Tower	Amadeo I (1871–1873)	
Pascual Bayarri García (1812–1876)	17 January 1872	10 August 1872	206 days	Non-partisan	Manuel Ruiz Zorrilla	Amadeo I (1871–1873)	
Eugenio Díez Pedreño (1798–1877)	10 August 1872	12 November 1873	1 year, 94 days	Liberal Unionist	Manuel Ruiz Zorrilla	Amadeo I (1871–1873)	
Eugenio Díez Pedreño (1798–1877)	10 August 1872	12 November 1873	1 year, 94 days	Liberal Unionist	Manuel Ruiz Zorrilla	List of presidents of the First Republic	
Eugenio Díez Pedreño (1798–1877)	10 August 1872	12 November 1873	1 year, 94 days	Liberal Unionist	Estanislao Figueras	List of presidents of the First Republic	
Eugenio Díez Pedreño (1798–1877)	10 August 1872	12 November 1873	1 year, 94 days	Liberal Unionist	Francesc Pi i Margall	List of presidents of the First Republic	
Eugenio Díez Pedreño (1798–1877)	10 August 1872	12 November 1873	1 year, 94 days	Liberal Unionist	Nicolás Salmerón	List of presidents of the First Republic	
Eugenio Díez Pedreño (1798–1877)	10 August 1872	12 November 1873	1 year, 94 days	Liberal Unionist	Emilio Castelar	List of presidents of the First Republic	
Vacant during this interval. Both the position of prosecutor and lieutenant prosecutor were vacant.					Emilio Castelar	List of presidents of the First Republic	
Alejandro Benito y Ávila	22 December 1873	17 April 1874	116 days	Non-partisan	Emilio Castelar	List of presidents of the First Republic	
Alejandro Benito y Ávila	22 December 1873	17 April 1874	116 days	Non-partisan	The Duke of the Tower	List of presidents of the First Republic	
Alejandro Benito y Ávila	22 December 1873	17 April 1874	116 days	Non-partisan	The Marquess of Sierra Bullones	List of presidents of the First Republic	
Ricardo Díaz de Rueda (1818/19–1894)	17 April 1874	26 June 1874	70 days	Non-partisan	The Marquess of Sierra Bullones	List of presidents of the First Republic	
Críspulo García y Gómez de la Serna (?–1876)	26 June 1874	31 January 1875†	219 days	Non-partisan	The Marquess of Sierra Bullones	List of presidents of the First Republic	
Críspulo García y Gómez de la Serna (?–1876)	26 June 1874	31 January 1875†	219 days	Non-partisan	Práxedes Mateo Sagasta	List of presidents of the First Republic	
Críspulo García y Gómez de la Serna (?–1876)	26 June 1874	31 January 1875†	219 days	Non-partisan	Antonio Cánovas del Castillo	Alfonso XII (1874–1885)	
Alejandro Benito y Ávila	31 January 1875	27 February 1875	27 days	Non-partisan	Antonio Cánovas del Castillo	Alfonso XII (1874–1885)	
Saturnino Álvarez Bugallal (1834–1885)	27 February 1875	11 July 1877	2 years, 134 days	Conservative	Antonio Cánovas del Castillo	Alfonso XII (1874–1885)	
Saturnino Álvarez Bugallal (1834–1885)	27 February 1875	11 July 1877	2 years, 134 days	Conservative	Joaquín Jovellar y Soler	Alfonso XII (1874–1885)	
Saturnino Álvarez Bugallal (1834–1885)	27 February 1875	11 July 1877	2 years, 134 days	Conservative	Antonio Cánovas del Castillo	Alfonso XII (1874–1885)	
Ricardo Alzugaray Yanguas (?–1878)	11 July 1877	3 October 1878†	1 year, 84 days	Conservative	Antonio Cánovas del Castillo	Alfonso XII (1874–1885)	
Eduardo Martínez del Campo y Acosta (1840–1911)	3 October 1878	20 October 1878	17 days	Non-partisan	Antonio Cánovas del Castillo	Alfonso XII (1874–1885)	
Salvador Albacete y Albert (1827–1890)	20 October 1878	15 March 1879	146 days	Conservative	Antonio Cánovas del Castillo	Alfonso XII (1874–1885)	
Salvador Albacete y Albert (1827–1890)	20 October 1878	15 March 1879	146 days	Conservative	Arsenio Martínez Campos	Alfonso XII (1874–1885)	
Antonio de Mena y Zorrilla (1823–1895)	20 March 1879	14 February 1881	1 year, 331 days	Conservative	Arsenio Martínez Campos	Alfonso XII (1874–1885)	
Antonio de Mena y Zorrilla (1823–1895)	20 March 1879	14 February 1881	1 year, 331 days	Conservative	Antonio Cánovas del Castillo	Alfonso XII (1874–1885)	
Antonio de Mena y Zorrilla (1823–1895)	20 March 1879	14 February 1881	1 year, 331 days	Conservative	Práxedes Mateo Sagasta	Alfonso XII (1874–1885)	
Aureliano Linares Rivas (1841–1903)	14 February 1881	17 May 1882	1 year, 92 days	Liberal	Práxedes Mateo Sagasta	Alfonso XII (1874–1885)	
Ricardo Gullón Iglesias	17 May 1882	7 July 1882	51 days	Non-partisan	Práxedes Mateo Sagasta	Alfonso XII (1874–1885)	
Trinitario Ruiz Capdepón (1836–1911)	7 July 1882	7 January 1884	1 year, 184 days	Liberal	Práxedes Mateo Sagasta	Alfonso XII (1874–1885)	
Trinitario Ruiz Capdepón (1836–1911)	7 July 1882	7 January 1884	1 year, 184 days	Liberal	José Posada Herrera	Alfonso XII (1874–1885)	
Manuel López de Azcutia (1815–1887)	7 January 1884	22 January 1884	15 days	Non-partisan	José Posada Herrera	Alfonso XII (1874–1885)	
Manuel López de Azcutia (1815–1887)	7 January 1884	22 January 1884	15 days	Non-partisan	Antonio Cánovas del Castillo	Alfonso XII (1874–1885)	
Santos Isasa y Valseca (1822–1907)	22 January 1884	17 December 1885	1 year, 329 days	Conservative	Antonio Cánovas del Castillo	Alfonso XII (1874–1885)	
Santos Isasa y Valseca (1822–1907)	22 January 1884	17 December 1885	1 year, 329 days	Conservative	Práxedes Mateo Sagasta	Alfonso XIII (1886–1931)	
Manuel López de Azcutia (1815–1887)	17 December 1885	15 February 1886	60 days	Non-partisan	Práxedes Mateo Sagasta	Alfonso XIII (1886–1931)	
Manuel Colmeiro y Penido (1818–1894)	15 February 1886	10 July 1890	4 years, 145 days	Liberal	Práxedes Mateo Sagasta	Alfonso XIII (1886–1931)	
Manuel Colmeiro y Penido (1818–1894)	15 February 1886	10 July 1890	4 years, 145 days	Liberal	Antonio Cánovas del Castillo	Alfonso XIII (1886–1931)	
Juan de la Concha Castañeda (1818–1903)	10 July 1890	23 November 1891	1 year, 136 days	Conservative	Antonio Cánovas del Castillo	Alfonso XIII (1886–1931)	
Juan de Aldana y Carvajal (1835–1914)	23 November 1891	27 November 1891	4 days	Non-partisan	Antonio Cánovas del Castillo	Alfonso XIII (1886–1931)	
Rafael Conde y Luque (1835–1922)	27 November 1891	22 December 1892	1 year, 25 days	Conservative	Antonio Cánovas del Castillo	Alfonso XIII (1886–1931)	
Rafael Conde y Luque (1835–1922)	27 November 1891	22 December 1892	1 year, 25 days	Conservative	Práxedes Mateo Sagasta	Alfonso XIII (1886–1931)	
Eduardo Martínez del Campo y Acosta (1840–1911)	22 December 1892	2 April 1894	1 year, 101 days	Liberal	Práxedes Mateo Sagasta	Alfonso XIII (1886–1931)	
Juan de Aldana y Carvajal (1835–1914)	2 April 1894	8 July 1895	1 year, 97 days	Non-partisan	Práxedes Mateo Sagasta	Alfonso XIII (1886–1931)	
Juan de Aldana y Carvajal (1835–1914)	2 April 1894	8 July 1895	1 year, 97 days	Non-partisan	Antonio Cánovas del Castillo†	Alfonso XIII (1886–1931)	
Luciano Puga Blanco (1842–1899)	8 July 1895	8 October 1897	2 years, 92 days	Conservative	Antonio Cánovas del Castillo†	Alfonso XIII (1886–1931)	
Luciano Puga Blanco (1842–1899)	8 July 1895	8 October 1897	2 years, 92 days	Conservative	Marcelo Azcárraga	Alfonso XIII (1886–1931)	
Luciano Puga Blanco (1842–1899)	8 July 1895	8 October 1897	2 years, 92 days	Conservative	Práxedes Mateo Sagasta	Alfonso XIII (1886–1931)	
Juan de Aldana y Carvajal (1835–1914)	8 October 1897	21 October 1897	13 days	Non-partisan	Práxedes Mateo Sagasta	Alfonso XIII (1886–1931)	
Felipe Sánchez Román (1850–1916)	21 October 1897	7 March 1899	1 year, 137 days	Liberal	Práxedes Mateo Sagasta	Alfonso XIII (1886–1931)	
Felipe Sánchez Román (1850–1916)	21 October 1897	7 March 1899	1 year, 137 days	Liberal	Francisco Silvela	Alfonso XIII (1886–1931)	
Salvador Viada y Vilaseca (1843–1904)	7 March 1899	25 June 1900	1 year, 110 days	Conservative	Francisco Silvela	Alfonso XIII (1886–1931)	
José Díez Macuso (1844–1916)	25 June 1900	11 March 1901	259 days	Conservative	Francisco Silvela	Alfonso XIII (1886–1931)	
José Díez Macuso (1844–1916)	25 June 1900	11 March 1901	259 days	Conservative	Marcelo Azcárraga	Alfonso XIII (1886–1931)	
José Díez Macuso (1844–1916)	25 June 1900	11 March 1901	259 days	Conservative	Práxedes Mateo Sagasta	Alfonso XIII (1886–1931)	
Juan Montilla y Adán (1856–1903)	11 March 1901	19 March 1902	1 year, 8 days	Liberal	Práxedes Mateo Sagasta	Alfonso XIII (1886–1931)	
Pascual Doménech Tomás (1842–1925)	19 March 1902	7 April 1902	19 days	Conservative	Práxedes Mateo Sagasta	Alfonso XIII (1886–1931)	
Trinitario Ruiz Valarino (1862–1945)	7 April 1902	7 December 1902	244 days	Liberal	Práxedes Mateo Sagasta	Alfonso XIII (1886–1931)	
The Count of Bugallal (1861–1932)	6 December 1902	20 July 1903	226 days	Conservative	Francisco Silvela	Alfonso XIII (1886–1931)	
Antonio Martínez Lage y López	20 July 1903	28 July 1903	8 days	Non-partisan	The Marquess of Pozo Rubio	Alfonso XIII (1886–1931)	
Eugenio Silvela y Corral (1866–1912)	28 July 1903	8 December 1903	133 days	Conservative	The Marquess of Pozo Rubio	Alfonso XIII (1886–1931)	
Eugenio Silvela y Corral (1866–1912)	28 July 1903	8 December 1903	133 days	Conservative	Antonio Maura	Alfonso XIII (1886–1931)	
Joan Maluquer y Viladot (1856–1940)	9 December 1903	28 June 1905	1 year, 201 days	Conservative	Antonio Maura	Alfonso XIII (1886–1931)	
Joan Maluquer y Viladot (1856–1940)	9 December 1903	28 June 1905	1 year, 201 days	Conservative	Marcelo Azcárraga	Alfonso XIII (1886–1931)	
Joan Maluquer y Viladot (1856–1940)	9 December 1903	28 June 1905	1 year, 201 days	Conservative	The Marquess of Pozo Rubio	Alfonso XIII (1886–1931)	
Joan Maluquer y Viladot (1856–1940)	9 December 1903	28 June 1905	1 year, 201 days	Conservative	Eugenio Montero Ríos	Alfonso XIII (1886–1931)	
Trinitario Ruiz Valarino (1862–1945)	28 June 1905	28 January 1907	1 year, 214 days	Liberal	Eugenio Montero Ríos	Alfonso XIII (1886–1931)	
Trinitario Ruiz Valarino (1862–1945)	28 June 1905	28 January 1907	1 year, 214 days	Liberal	Segismundo Moret	Alfonso XIII (1886–1931)	
Trinitario Ruiz Valarino (1862–1945)	28 June 1905	28 January 1907	1 year, 214 days	Liberal	José López Domínguez	Alfonso XIII (1886–1931)	
Trinitario Ruiz Valarino (1862–1945)	28 June 1905	28 January 1907	1 year, 214 days	Liberal	Segismundo Moret	Alfonso XIII (1886–1931)	
Trinitario Ruiz Valarino (1862–1945)	28 June 1905	28 January 1907	1 year, 214 days	Liberal	The Marquess of Vega de Armijo	Alfonso XIII (1886–1931)	
Trinitario Ruiz Valarino (1862–1945)	28 June 1905	28 January 1907	1 year, 214 days	Liberal	Antonio Maura	Alfonso XIII (1886–1931)	
Francisco Javier Ugarte Pagés (1852–1919)	28 January 1907	30 October 1909	2 years, 275 days	Conservative	Antonio Maura	Alfonso XIII (1886–1931)	
Francisco Javier Ugarte Pagés (1852–1919)	28 January 1907	30 October 1909	2 years, 275 days	Conservative	Segismundo Moret	Alfonso XIII (1886–1931)	
Trinitario Ruiz Valarino (1862–1945)	30 October 1909	9 February 1910	102 days	Liberal	Segismundo Moret	Alfonso XIII (1886–1931)	
Joaquín Ruiz Jiménez (1854–1934)	10 February 1910	14 June 1910	124 days	Liberal	José Canalejas y Méndez†	Alfonso XIII (1886–1931)	
Javier Gómez de la Serna y Laguna (1862–1922)	14 June 1910	15 November 1910	154 days	Liberal	José Canalejas y Méndez†	Alfonso XIII (1886–1931)	
Buenaventura Muñoz Rodríguez (1853–1925)	15 November 1910	23 July 1911	250 days	Liberal	José Canalejas y Méndez†	Alfonso XIII (1886–1931)	
Andrés Tornos y Alonso (1854–1926)	23 July 1911	16 September 1911	1 year, 76 days	Non-partisan	José Canalejas y Méndez†	Alfonso XIII (1886–1931)	
Andrés Tornos y Alonso (1854–1926)	16 September 1911	7 October 1912	1 year, 76 days	Non-partisan	José Canalejas y Méndez†	Alfonso XIII (1886–1931)	
Manuel Portela Valladares (1867–1952)	7 October 1912	17 March 1913	161 days	Liberal	José Canalejas y Méndez†	Alfonso XIII (1886–1931)	
Manuel Portela Valladares (1867–1952)	7 October 1912	17 March 1913	161 days	Liberal	The Marquess of Alhucemas (Note: He acted as acting prime minister after the assassination of José Canalejas on 12 November 1912)	Alfonso XIII (1886–1931)	
Manuel Portela Valladares (1867–1952)	7 October 1912	17 March 1913	161 days	Liberal	The Count of Romanones	Alfonso XIII (1886–1931)	
The Duke of Almodóvar del Valle (1872–1931)	17 March 1913	19 June 1913	94 days	Liberal	The Count of Romanones	Alfonso XIII (1886–1931)	
José Parres Sobrino (1865–1917)	19 June 1913	31 October 1913	134 days	Liberal	The Count of Romanones	Alfonso XIII (1886–1931)	
José Parres Sobrino (1865–1917)	19 June 1913	31 October 1913	134 days	Liberal	Eduardo Dato	Alfonso XIII (1886–1931)	
Joan Maluquer y Viladot (1856–1940)	31 October 1913	17 July 1914	259 days	Conservative	Eduardo Dato	Alfonso XIII (1886–1931)	
Senén Canido y Pardo (1847–1929)	17 July 1914	28 October 1915	1 year, 103 days	Conservative	Eduardo Dato	Alfonso XIII (1886–1931)	
Francisco Aparicio y Ruiz (1852–1932)	28 October 1915	13 December 1915	46 days	Conservative	Eduardo Dato	Alfonso XIII (1886–1931)	
Francisco Aparicio y Ruiz (1852–1932)	28 October 1915	13 December 1915	46 days	Conservative	The Count of Romanones	Alfonso XIII (1886–1931)	
Andrés Avelino Montero Ríos y Villegas (1875–1922)	13 December 1915	1 May 1917	1 year, 139 days	Liberal	The Count of Romanones	Alfonso XIII (1886–1931)	
Andrés Avelino Montero Ríos y Villegas (1875–1922)	13 December 1915	1 May 1917	1 year, 139 days	Liberal	The Marquess of Alhucemas	Alfonso XIII (1886–1931)	
Pablo Garnica y Echevarría (1876–1959)	1 May 1917	15 June 1917	45 days	Liberal	The Marquess of Alhucemas	Alfonso XIII (1886–1931)	
Pablo Garnica y Echevarría (1876–1959)	1 May 1917	15 June 1917	45 days	Liberal	Eduardo Dato	Alfonso XIII (1886–1931)	
Carlos Cañal y Migolla (1876–1938)	15 June 1917	13 November 1917	151 days	Conservative	Eduardo Dato	Alfonso XIII (1886–1931)	
Carlos Cañal y Migolla (1876–1938)	15 June 1917	13 November 1917	151 days	Conservative	The Marquess of Alhucemas	Alfonso XIII (1886–1931)	
Álvaro Landeira Mariño (?–1917)	13 November 1917	11 December 1917†	28 days	Liberal	The Marquess of Alhucemas	Alfonso XIII (1886–1931)	
Antonio María de Mena y Calvo Rubio	11 December 1917	15 December 1917	4 days	Non-partisan	The Marquess of Alhucemas	Alfonso XIII (1886–1931)	
Víctor Covián y Junco (1848–1927)	15 December 1917	5 March 1923	5 years, 80 days	Non-partisan	The Marquess of Alhucemas	Alfonso XIII (1886–1931)	
Víctor Covián y Junco (1848–1927)	15 December 1917	5 March 1923	5 years, 80 days	Non-partisan	Antonio Maura	Alfonso XIII (1886–1931)	
Víctor Covián y Junco (1848–1927)	15 December 1917	5 March 1923	5 years, 80 days	Non-partisan	The Marquess of Alhucemas	Alfonso XIII (1886–1931)	
Víctor Covián y Junco (1848–1927)	15 December 1917	5 March 1923	5 years, 80 days	Non-partisan	The Count of Romanones	Alfonso XIII (1886–1931)	
Víctor Covián y Junco (1848–1927)	15 December 1917	5 March 1923	5 years, 80 days	Non-partisan	Antonio Maura	Alfonso XIII (1886–1931)	
Víctor Covián y Junco (1848–1927)	15 December 1917	5 March 1923	5 years, 80 days	Non-partisan	Joaquín Sánchez de Toca	Alfonso XIII (1886–1931)	
Víctor Covián y Junco (1848–1927)	15 December 1917	5 March 1923	5 years, 80 days	Non-partisan	Manuel Allendesalazar	Alfonso XIII (1886–1931)	
Víctor Covián y Junco (1848–1927)	15 December 1917	5 March 1923	5 years, 80 days	Non-partisan	Eduardo Dato†	Alfonso XIII (1886–1931)	
Víctor Covián y Junco (1848–1927)	15 December 1917	5 March 1923	5 years, 80 days	Non-partisan	The Count of Bugallal (Note: He acted acting prime minister after the assassination of Eduardo Dato from March 8 to March 13, 1921)	Alfonso XIII (1886–1931)	
Víctor Covián y Junco (1848–1927)	15 December 1917	5 March 1923	5 years, 80 days	Non-partisan	Manuel Allendesalazar	Alfonso XIII (1886–1931)	
Víctor Covián y Junco (1848–1927)	15 December 1917	5 March 1923	5 years, 80 days	Non-partisan	Antonio Maura	Alfonso XIII (1886–1931)	
Víctor Covián y Junco (1848–1927)	15 December 1917	5 March 1923	5 years, 80 days	Non-partisan	José Sánchez-Guerra y Martínez	Alfonso XIII (1886–1931)	
Víctor Covián y Junco (1848–1927)	15 December 1917	5 March 1923	5 years, 80 days	Non-partisan	The Marquess of Alhucemas	Alfonso XIII (1886–1931)	
José Lladó Vallés (1888–1933)	5 March 1923	20 September 1923	199 days	Liberal	The Marquess of Alhucemas	Alfonso XIII (1886–1931)	
José Lladó Vallés (1888–1933)	5 March 1923	20 September 1923	199 days	Liberal	The Marquess of Estella	Alfonso XIII (1886–1931)	
Antonio Cubillo Muro	20 September 1923	21 December 1923	92 days	Non-partisan	The Marquess of Estella	Alfonso XIII (1886–1931)	
Juan Morlesín Soto	21 December 1923	30 June 1924	192 days	Non-partisan	The Marquess of Estella	Alfonso XIII (1886–1931)	
Galo Ponte y Escartín (1867–1943)	30 June 1924	3 December 1925	1 year, 156 days	Non-partisan	The Marquess of Estella	Alfonso XIII (1886–1931)	
Federico López González	3 December 1925	7 December 1925	4 days	Non-partisan	The Marquess of Estella	Alfonso XIII (1886–1931)	
Diego María Crehuet del Amo (1873–1956)	7 December 1925	2 January 1928	2 years, 26 days	Patriotic Unionist	The Marquess of Estella	Alfonso XIII (1886–1931)	
José Oppelt García (1862–1926)	2 January 1928	6 February 1930	2 years, 35 days	Patriotic Unionist	The Marquess of Estella	Alfonso XIII (1886–1931)	
José Oppelt García (1862–1926)	2 January 1928	6 February 1930	2 years, 35 days	Patriotic Unionist	The Count of Xauen	Alfonso XIII (1886–1931)	
Santiago del Valle y Aldabalde (1865–1940)	6 February 1930	16 December 1930	313 days	Non-partisan	The Count of Xauen	Alfonso XIII (1886–1931)	
Manuel Moreno y Fernández de Roda	16 December 1930	15 April 1931	120 days	Non-partisan	The Count of Xauen	Alfonso XIII (1886–1931)	
Manuel Moreno y Fernández de Roda	16 December 1930	15 April 1931	120 days	Non-partisan	Juan Bautista Aznar-Cabañas	Alfonso XIII (1886–1931)	
Manuel Moreno y Fernández de Roda	16 December 1930	15 April 1931	120 days	Non-partisan	Niceto Alcalá-Zamora	Niceto Alcalá-Zamora (1931–1936)	
Ángel Galarza (1892–1966)	15 April 1931	13 May 1931	28 days	Radical Socialist Republican	Niceto Alcalá-Zamora	Niceto Alcalá-Zamora (1931–1936)	
Francisco Javier Elola (1877–1939)	13 May 1931	30 July 1931	78 days	Radical Republican	Niceto Alcalá-Zamora	Niceto Alcalá-Zamora (1931–1936)	
José Franchy y Roca (1871–1944)	1 August 1931	23 December 1931	144 days	Federal Republican	Niceto Alcalá-Zamora	Niceto Alcalá-Zamora (1931–1936)	
José Franchy y Roca (1871–1944)	1 August 1931	23 December 1931	144 days	Federal Republican	Manuel Azaña	Niceto Alcalá-Zamora (1931–1936)	
Gabriel Martínez de Aragón Urbiztondo (1865–1934)	23 December 1931	4 March 1933	1 year, 71 days	Republican Action	Manuel Azaña	Niceto Alcalá-Zamora (1931–1936)	
José Vallés Fortuño (1862–?)	4 March 1933	9 May 1933	66 days	Non-partisan	Manuel Azaña	Niceto Alcalá-Zamora (1931–1936)	
José Oriol Anguera de Sojo (1879–1956)	9 May 1933	18 September 1933	132 days	CEDA	Manuel Azaña	Niceto Alcalá-Zamora (1931–1936)	
José Oriol Anguera de Sojo (1879–1956)	9 May 1933	18 September 1933	132 days	CEDA	Alejandro Lerroux	Niceto Alcalá-Zamora (1931–1936)	
Antonio Marsá Bragado (1877–1965)	18 September 1933	24 May 1934	248 days	Radical Republican	Alejandro Lerroux	Niceto Alcalá-Zamora (1931–1936)	
Antonio Marsá Bragado (1877–1965)	18 September 1933	24 May 1934	248 days	Radical Republican	Diego Martínez Barrio	Niceto Alcalá-Zamora (1931–1936)	
Antonio Marsá Bragado (1877–1965)	18 September 1933	24 May 1934	248 days	Radical Republican	Alejandro Lerroux	Niceto Alcalá-Zamora (1931–1936)	
Antonio Marsá Bragado (1877–1965)	18 September 1933	24 May 1934	248 days	Radical Republican	Ricardo Samper	Niceto Alcalá-Zamora (1931–1936)	
Lorenzo Gallardo González (1880–1940)	24 May 1934	15 November 1935	1 year, 175 days	Non-partisan	Ricardo Samper	Niceto Alcalá-Zamora (1931–1936)	
Lorenzo Gallardo González (1880–1940)	24 May 1934	15 November 1935	1 year, 175 days	Non-partisan	Alejandro Lerroux	Niceto Alcalá-Zamora (1931–1936)	
Lorenzo Gallardo González (1880–1940)	24 May 1934	15 November 1935	1 year, 175 days	Non-partisan	Joaquín Chapaprieta	Niceto Alcalá-Zamora (1931–1936)	
Marcelino Valentín Gamazo (1879–1936)	15 November 1935	23 December 1935	38 days	Non-partisan	Joaquín Chapaprieta	Niceto Alcalá-Zamora (1931–1936)	
Marcelino Valentín Gamazo (1879–1936)	15 November 1935	23 December 1935	38 days	Non-partisan	Manuel Portela Valladares	Niceto Alcalá-Zamora (1931–1936)	
Antonio Taboada Tundidor (1888–1959)	23 December 1935	1 January 1936	9 days	Agrarian	Manuel Portela Valladares	Niceto Alcalá-Zamora (1931–1936)	
Manuel Iglesias Corral (1901–1989)	2 January 1936	7 February 1936	36 days	Galician Autonomist	Manuel Portela Valladares	Niceto Alcalá-Zamora (1931–1936)	
José Vallés Fortuño (1862–?)	7 February 1936	21 February 1936	14 days	Non-partisan	Manuel Portela Valladares	Niceto Alcalá-Zamora (1931–1936)	
Alberto de Paz y Mateos	21 February 1936	26 August 1936	187 days	Non-partisan	Manuel Azaña	Niceto Alcalá-Zamora (1931–1936)	
Alberto de Paz y Mateos	21 February 1936	26 August 1936	187 days	Non-partisan	Augusto Barcia Trelles (Note: Acting prime minister from 10 to 13 May 1936)	Manuel Azaña (1936–1939)	
Alberto de Paz y Mateos	21 February 1936	26 August 1936	187 days	Non-partisan	Santiago Casares Quiroga	Manuel Azaña (1936–1939)	
Alberto de Paz y Mateos	21 February 1936	26 August 1936	187 days	Non-partisan	Diego Martínez Barrio	Manuel Azaña (1936–1939)	
Alberto de Paz y Mateos	21 February 1936	26 August 1936	187 days	Non-partisan	José Giral	Manuel Azaña (1936–1939)	
José Vallés Fortuño (1862–?)	26 August 1936	10 December 1936	106 days	Non-partisan	José Giral	Manuel Azaña (1936–1939)	
José Vallés Fortuño (1862–?)	26 August 1936	10 December 1936	106 days	Non-partisan	Francisco Largo Caballero	Manuel Azaña (1936–1939)	
Eduardo Ortega y Gasset (1882–1965)	10 December 1936	13 November 1937	338 days	Radical Socialist Left	Francisco Largo Caballero	Manuel Azaña (1936–1939)	
Eduardo Ortega y Gasset (1882–1965)	10 December 1936	13 November 1937	338 days	Radical Socialist Left	Juan Negrín	Manuel Azaña (1936–1939)	
Carlos de Juan Rodríguez (1890–?)	13 November 1937	24 December 1937	41 days	Non-partisan	Juan Negrín	Manuel Azaña (1936–1939)	
Leopoldo Garrido Cavero (1893–1946)	24 December 1937	31 March 1939	1 year, 97 days	Socialist	Juan Negrín	Manuel Azaña (1936–1939)	
Leopoldo Garrido Cavero (1893–1946)	24 December 1937	31 March 1939	1 year, 97 days	Socialist	National Defence Council	José Miaja (1939)	
Blas Pérez González (Note: Prosecutor General of the Rebel side.) (1898–1978)	10 November 1938	3 September 1942	3 years, 297 days	National Movement	Franco I	Francisco Franco (1939–1975)	
Blas Pérez González (1898–1978)	10 November 1938	3 September 1942	3 years, 297 days	National Movement	Franco II	Francisco Franco (1939–1975)	
Ramón García del Valle y Salas (1881–1961)	3 September 1942	12 September 1945	3 years, 9 days	National Movement	Franco II	Francisco Franco (1939–1975)	
Manuel de la Plaza Navarro (1886–1960)	12 September 1945	21 October 1955	10 years, 39 days	National Movement	Franco III	Francisco Franco (1939–1975)	
Manuel de la Plaza Navarro (1886–1960)	12 September 1945	21 October 1955	10 years, 39 days	National Movement	Franco IV	Francisco Franco (1939–1975)	
Ildefonso Alamillo Salgado (1888–1981)	21 October 1955	30 September 1965	9 years, 344 days	National Movement	Franco IV	Francisco Franco (1939–1975)	
Ildefonso Alamillo Salgado (1888–1981)	21 October 1955	30 September 1965	9 years, 344 days	National Movement	Franco V	Francisco Franco (1939–1975)	
Ildefonso Alamillo Salgado (1888–1981)	21 October 1955	30 September 1965	9 years, 344 days	National Movement	Franco VI	Francisco Franco (1939–1975)	
Fernando Herrero Tejedor (1920–1975)	30 September 1965	21 March 1975	9 years, 172 days	National Movement	Franco VII	Francisco Franco (1939–1975)	
Fernando Herrero Tejedor (1920–1975)	30 September 1965	21 March 1975	9 years, 172 days	National Movement	Franco VIII	Francisco Franco (1939–1975)	
Fernando Herrero Tejedor (1920–1975)	30 September 1965	21 March 1975	9 years, 172 days	National Movement	Luis Carrero Blanco†	Francisco Franco (1939–1975)	
Fernando Herrero Tejedor (1920–1975)	30 September 1965	21 March 1975	9 years, 172 days	National Movement	The Duke of Fernández-Miranda (acting)	Francisco Franco (1939–1975)	
Fernando Herrero Tejedor (1920–1975)	30 September 1965	21 March 1975	9 years, 172 days	National Movement	The Marquess of Arias Navarro	Francisco Franco (1939–1975)	
José María González Serrano	21 March 1975	25 April 1975	35 days	Non-partisan	The Marquess of Arias Navarro	Francisco Franco (1939–1975)	
Antonio García Rodríguez-Acosta (1921–2006)	25 April 1975	10 December 1976	1 year, 229 days	National Movement	The Marquess of Arias Navarro	Francisco Franco (1939–1975)	
Antonio García Rodríguez-Acosta (1921–2006)	25 April 1975	10 December 1976	1 year, 229 days	National Movement	The Marquess of Arias Navarro	Juan Carlos I (1975–2014)	
Antonio García Rodríguez-Acosta (1921–2006)	25 April 1975	10 December 1976	1 year, 229 days	National Movement	The Duke of Suárez	Juan Carlos I (1975–2014)	
Eleuterio González Zapatero (1916–1981)	10 December 1976	13 January 1978	1 year, 34 days	Non-partisan	The Duke of Suárez	Juan Carlos I (1975–2014)	
Juan Manuel Fanjul (1914–1989)	13 January 1978	14 November 1980	2 years, 306 days	Centrist	The Duke of Suárez	Juan Carlos I (1975–2014)	
José María Gil-Albert (1925–2007)	14 November 1980	15 December 1982	2 years, 31 days	Centrist	The Duke of Suárez	Juan Carlos I (1975–2014)	
José María Gil-Albert (1925–2007)	14 November 1980	15 December 1982	2 years, 31 days	Centrist	The Marquess of Ría de Ribadeo	Juan Carlos I (1975–2014)	
José María Gil-Albert (1925–2007)	14 November 1980	15 December 1982	2 years, 31 days	Centrist	Felipe González	Juan Carlos I (1975–2014)	
Luis Antonio Burón Barba (1918–1995)	15 December 1982	19 September 1986	3 years, 278 days	Non-partisan	Felipe González	Juan Carlos I (1975–2014)	
Javier Moscoso (1934–2025)	19 September 1986	26 January 1990	3 years, 129 days	Non-partisan	Felipe González	Juan Carlos I (1975–2014)	
Leopoldo Torres Boursault (1941–2021)	26 January 1990	10 April 1992	2 years, 75 days	Non-partisan	Felipe González	Juan Carlos I (1975–2014)	
Eligio Hernández Gutiérrez (born 1947)	10 April 1992	4 June 1994	2 years, 55 days	Non-partisan	Felipe González	Juan Carlos I (1975–2014)	
Carlos Granados Pérez (born 1944)	4 June 1994	6 September 1996	2 years, 94 days	Non-partisan	Felipe González	Juan Carlos I (1975–2014)	
Carlos Granados Pérez (born 1944)	4 June 1994	6 September 1996	2 years, 94 days	Non-partisan	José María Aznar	Juan Carlos I (1975–2014)	
Juan Cesáreo Ortiz Úrculo (born 1939)	6 September 1996	16 May 1997	252 days	Non-partisan	José María Aznar	Juan Carlos I (1975–2014)	
Jesús Cardenal (1930–2018)	16 May 1997	23 April 2004	6 years, 343 days	Non-partisan	José María Aznar	Juan Carlos I (1975–2014)	
Jesús Cardenal (1930–2018)	16 May 1997	23 April 2004	6 years, 343 days	Non-partisan	José Luis Rodríguez Zapatero	Juan Carlos I (1975–2014)	
Cándido Conde-Pumpido (born 1949)	23 April 2004	16 December 2011	7 years, 237 days	Non-partisan	José Luis Rodríguez Zapatero	Juan Carlos I (1975–2014)	
Juan José Martín-Casallo López (1943–2024)	16 December 2011	27 January 2012	42 days	Non-partisan	José Luis Rodríguez Zapatero	Juan Carlos I (1975–2014)	
Juan José Martín-Casallo López (1943–2024)	16 December 2011	27 January 2012	42 days	Non-partisan	Mariano Rajoy	Juan Carlos I (1975–2014)	
Eduardo Torres-Dulce (born 1950)	27 January 2012	19 December 2014	2 years, 326 days	Non-partisan	Mariano Rajoy	Juan Carlos I (1975–2014)	
Eduardo Torres-Dulce (born 1950)	27 January 2012	19 December 2014	2 years, 326 days	Non-partisan	Mariano Rajoy	Felipe VI (2014-present)	
Luis Navajas (born 1948)	19 December 2014	9 January 2015	21 days	Non-partisan	Mariano Rajoy	Felipe VI (2014-present)	
Consuelo Madrigal (born 1956)	9 January 2015	4 November 2016	1 year, 300 days	Non-partisan	Mariano Rajoy	Felipe VI (2014-present)	
Luis Navajas (born 1948)	4 November 2016	25 November 2016	21 days	Non-partisan	Mariano Rajoy	Felipe VI (2014-present)	
José Manuel Maza (1951–2017)	25 November 2016	18 November 2017†	358 days	Non-partisan	Mariano Rajoy	Felipe VI (2014-present)	
Luis Navajas (born 1948)	18 November 2017	7 December 2017	19 days	Non-partisan	Mariano Rajoy	Felipe VI (2014-present)	
Julián Sánchez Melgar (born 1955)	7 December 2017	21 June 2018	196 days	Non-partisan	Mariano Rajoy	Felipe VI (2014-present)	
Julián Sánchez Melgar (born 1955)	7 December 2017	21 June 2018	196 days	Non-partisan	Pedro Sánchez	Felipe VI (2014-present)	
Luis Navajas (born 1948)	21 June 2018	29 June 2018	8 days	Non-partisan	Pedro Sánchez	Felipe VI (2014-present)	
María José Segarra (born 1963)	29 June 2018	14 January 2020	1 year, 199 days	Non-partisan	Pedro Sánchez	Felipe VI (2014-present)	
Luis Navajas (born 1948)	14 January 2020	25 February 2020	42 days	Non-partisan	Pedro Sánchez	Felipe VI (2014-present)	
Dolores Delgado (born 1962)	25 February 2020	19 July 2022	2 years, 144 days	Non-partisan	Pedro Sánchez	Felipe VI (2014-present)	
María Ángeles Sánchez Conde (born 1956)	19 July 2022	1 August 2022	13 days	Non-partisan	Pedro Sánchez	Felipe VI (2014-present)	
Álvaro García Ortiz (born 1967)	1 August 2022	9 December 2025	3 years, 130 days	Non-partisan	Pedro Sánchez	Felipe VI (2014-present)	
Teresa Peramato Martín (born 1962)	9 December 2025	Incumbent	321 days	Non-partisan	Pedro Sánchez	Felipe VI (2014-present)	
