= Juan Ignacio Campos =

Spanish attorney (1950–2021)

Juan Ignacio Campos Campos (7 November 1950 – 15 December 2021) was a Spanish attorney, lieutenant attorney of the Supreme Court of Spain between 2020 and his death in 2021.

== Biography and career ==
Campos was born on 7 November 1950 in Ciudad Real, Spain. He graduated in Law and entered the prosecutor's career at the end of 1977. His first assignment, in 1978, was at the Territorial Court of Barcelona and he remained there until 1982, when he was assigned to Madrid. Eight years later, in 1990, he was appointed Deputy Prosecutor of the High Court of Justice of Madrid. During this period, his intervention in the murder of Lucrecia Pérez, the most important racism episode in Spain, stood out.

Barely four years later, in 1994, he was chosen by Attorney General Carlos Granados to be a prosecutor in the Technical Secretariat of the State Attorney General's Office. In 1996, he was assigned to the Supreme Court and in 2005 Attorney General Cándido Conde-Pumpido promoted him to the rank of Chief Prosecutor.

In 2012, he was appointed prosecutor for economic crimes. As an expert prosecutor in economic crimes, he participated in some of the largest corruption investigations in the country, such as the Terra Mítica case, the Gürtel case, the Nóos case, and the Operation Malaya. He has also participated in investigations into tax crimes of soccer players such as those related to Messi or Xabi Alonso. In 2017, Attorney General José Manuel Maza confirmed him as chief prosecutor of the Criminal Chamber of the Supreme Court.

In June 2020 Campos took over the investigation into the possible economic crimes of Emeritus King Juan Carlos I.

In December 2020 Campos presented his candidacy to replace Luis Navajas as lieutenant prosecutor of the Supreme Court. Campos was the only candidate and the Fiscal Council supported his appointment at its meeting on 22 December. On 12 January 2021 the Council of Ministers ratified the decision of the Fiscal Council, being officially appointed.

Campos died from cancer on 15 December 2021, at the age of 71. That same day he had been working in his office at the headquarters of the Attorney General's Office.
