= María José Segarra =

Spanish prosecutor

The Most Excellent María José Segarra
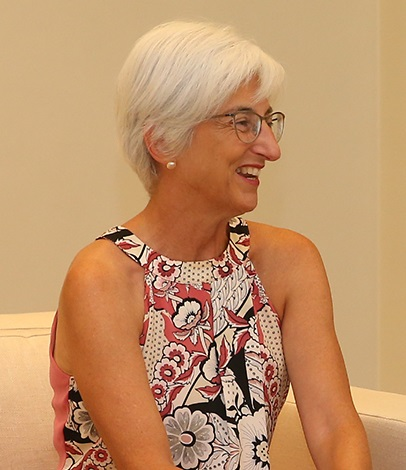

Prosecutor General of the State
- In office 29 June 2018 – 15 January 2020
- Preceded by: Julián Sánchez Melgar
- Succeeded by: Luis Navajas (acting); Dolores Delgado

Personal details
- Born: 1963 (age 62–63) Madrid, Spain
- Education: Autonomous University of Madrid

María José Segarra Crespo (born 1963), is a Spanish prosecutor who served as Prosecutor General of the State between 2018 and 2020. She began her career in the prosecutor's office in 1987. From 2004 to 2018 she was in charge of the Prosecutor's Office of Province of Seville.

== Career ==
=== Early career and education ===
She graduated in law from the Autonomous University of Madrid. She entered the Prosecutor Service on 14 September 1987 for the Territorial Court of Province of Barcelona, serving in the courts of Sant Boi de Llobregat, Sabadell and Barcelona, as well as coordinating the Children's Service.

=== Chief Prosecutor of Seville (2004–2018) ===
In 1993 she moved to Seville and in 2004, when she was 41 years old, she was appointed chief prosecutor of the Seville under Cándido Conde-Pumpido as head of the State Prosecutor General's Office becoming the second youngest chief prosecutor in Spain and the third woman to reach a head in this profession. She remained at the head of the Andalusian provincial prosecutor's office in the administrations of José Luis Rodríguez Zapatero and of Mariano Rajoy. She was renewed for the last time in 2015 under Prosecutor general Consuelo Madrigal At the head of this prosecutor's office, she faced trials like that of Murder of Marta del Castillo as well as coordination with the Anti-corruption Prosecutor's Office for the ERE and Invercaria. She has also highlighted her work creating and strengthening the group of economic crime Prosecutors, as well as focusing equally on strengthening the Violence against Women section.

In March 2018, she was appointed member of the Prosecutor's Council, occupying one of the nine seats of members of the consultative body that advises the Prosecutor General. During her candidacy, promoted by the Progressive Union of Prosecutors, she pointed out the importance of the deployment of the prosecutor's offices, digital development and denounced the few staff in the prosecutor's offices.

=== Prosecutor General (2018–2020) ===
On June 15, 2018, she was nominated by the Council of Ministers to be the head of the Prosecution Ministry, replacing Julián Sánchez Melgar who held the position for six months. The appointment of Segarra was endorsed by the General Council of the Judiciary. She was appointed on June 29 and was sworn in before the King on July 3, 2018.

On September 9, 2018, it was announced that the Public Prosecutor's Office would keep the accusation of rebellion for the separatist leaders that fled or are imprisoned.

In May 2019 Segarra issued a working circular with guidelines regarding the interpretation of article 150 of the Spanish Criminal Code concerning hate crime which advised prosecutors that aggression against people holding a belief in Nazi ideology or incitement to hatred against Nazis could be prosecuted under this law due to its ambiguity. The circular was strongly criticised by a number of lawyers and legal associations, including Judges for Democracy, who argued that the guidance could enable prosecutions of concentration camp survivors, and that it violated judgements made by the Constitutional Court.

Segarra was ceased from the office on 15 January 2020 as Dolores Delgado was nominated as her successor. Luis Navajas assumed the office of Prosecutor General ad interim until the formal appointing of Delgado.

She belongs to the Progressive Union of Prosecutors (UPF), a progressive Prosecutor's Union.

== See also ==
- Judiciary of Spain
- Prosecution Ministry
- 2017-18 Spanish constitutional crisis
