= Luis Navajas =

Spanish prosecutor

The Most Excellent Luis Navajas

Prosecutor General of the State Acting
- In office 15 January 2020 – 26 February 2020
- Preceded by: María José Segarra
- Succeeded by: Dolores Delgado
- In office 22 June 2018 – 29 June 2018
- Preceded by: Julián Sánchez Melgar
- Succeeded by: María José Segarra
- In office 18 November 2017 – 11 December 2017
- Preceded by: José Manuel Maza
- Succeeded by: Julián Sánchez Melgar
- In office 20 December 2014 – 10 January 2015
- Preceded by: Eduardo Torres-Dulce
- Succeeded by: Consuelo Madrigal

Lieutenant Prosecutor of the Supreme Court
- In office 1 November 2014 – 17 December 2020
- Preceded by: Antonio Narváez Rodríguez
- Succeeded by: Juan Ignacio Campos

Personal details
- Born: 17 December 1948 Granada, Spain

Luis Manuel Navajas Ramos (born 17 December 1948) is a Spanish retired prosecutor. He served as Lieutenant Prosecutor of the Supreme Court—second highest position within the Prosecution Ministry—from 2014 to 2020 and acting Prosecutor General of the State in several occasions.

== Career ==
He graduated in law, became professor between 1987 and 2003 of Crime Law at Basque Institute of Criminology and entered the judicial career in 1976. He was prosecutor of the Provincial Court of Guipúzcoa between 1987 and 2003. He became famous for his report that bears his name and that investigated some corrupt plots in the Intxarrurrondo barracks of the Guardia Civil and in which General Enrique Rodríguez was involved. Galindo The cause was shelved and received many criticisms of the environment of the fight against ETA.

=== Supreme Court Prosecutor ===
In 2003 he was appointed prosecutor of the Criminal Chamber of the Supreme Court and he was appointed Lieutenant Prosecutor of the same court on 31 October 2014. As a lieutenant prosecutor of the Supreme Court, he requested the dismissal of the case against Judge Baltasar Garzón for having declared competent to investigate Francoist Spain, in spite of the pact of forgetting.

=== Acting Prosecutor General ===
A month after being appointed Lieutenant Prosecutor, in December 2014, he assumed for the first time the position of Acting Prosecutor General of the State when Eduardo Torres-Dulce resigned from the post on 19 December 2014 and until Consuelo Madrigal did not take possession on 13 January 2015.

The second and most known term as prosecutor general was following the sudden death of José Manuel Maza in November 2017. It ceased in December, after the appointment of Julián Sánchez Melgar as prosecutor general. For a week, between June 22 and June 29, 2018, Navajas assumed the office until the definitive appointment of the prosecutor María José Segarra.

He hold the office acting again on 15 January 2020 when María José Segarra was ceased and until the taking of possession of Dolores Delgado on 26 February 2020.

Navajas retired in December 2020, at the age of 72 after 44 years of service.

== See also ==
- Judiciary of Spain
- 2017 Spanish constitutional crisis
- Operation Anubis
