= Julián Sánchez Melgar =

Spanish judge and prosecutor

The Most Excellent Julián Sánchez Melgar OSRP
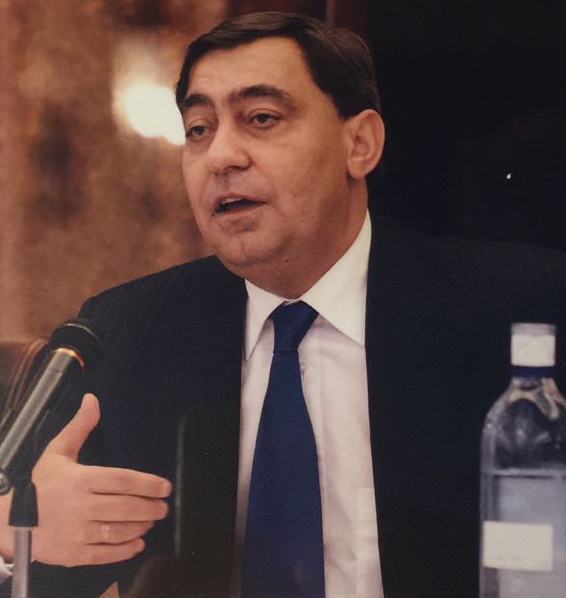

Prosecutor General of the State
- In office 11 December 2017 – 29 June 2018
- Preceded by: José Manuel Maza; Luis Navajas (acting)
- Succeeded by: María José Segarra

Personal details
- Born: 19 September 1955 (age 71) Palencia, Spain
- Education: University of Valladolid; University of A Coruña

Julián Artemio Sánchez Melgar (born 19 September 1955), is a Spanish judge and prosecutor currently serving as magistrate of the Second Chamber of the Supreme Court. He served as Prosecutor General of the State from December 2017 to June 2018. Because of being prosecutor general he was also member of the Council of State. He is considered a Magistrate with a conservative profile.

== Biography ==
He have a law degree from the University of Valladolid, and Doctor of Law from the University of La Coruña, with an extraordinary prize.

Acceded to the judicial career in 1983, being destined to the courts of Reinosa, Miranda de Ebro and Mataró, ascending to magistrate by the turn of selective tests, in 1987 (number 2 of its promotion). Destined in the then Territorial Court of Province of Barcelona (antecedent of the Superior Courts of Justice), has served as Judge Dean of the Courts of Santander, magistrate of the Civil and Criminal Chamber of the Superior Court of Justice of Cantabria (1993), president of the Audiencia Provincial de Ávila (1993-2000), and magistrate of the Second Chamber of the Supreme Court.

He has been Vocal of the Governing Board of the Judicial School and was a substitute control magistrate of the National Intelligence Center, until his replacement in December 2017 for his appointment as State Prosecutor General.

On 24 November 2017, he was appointed by the Government of Mariano Rajoy as the future Prosecutor General of the State, replacing José Manuel Maza, who died suddenly in Argentina six days earlier. On 7 December 2017, after passing the evaluation the General Council of the Judiciary and of the Cortes Generales, the government approved his appointment and he was sworn in before the King on 11 December. and took the office on 12th On 25 January 2018, he took office as a born member of the Council of State.

After the successful motion of no confidence against the government of Mariano Rajoy, he was dismissed on June 29, 2018 and Maria José Segarra was appointed Prosecutor General.

== Cases ==
He has been a speaker in the case of Nevenka Fernández against Ismael Álvarez, and in plenary on July 23, 2014 (narco-boats).

He has intervened in the case of the Yak-42, in the Ibarretxe and Patxi López case, in the request for a petition for Bárcenas and Merino at Gürtel case. He has intervened with a private vote in the Emilio Botín case and in the Juan María Atutxa case. He has also intervened in the case of the Historical Memory Law against Baltasar Garzón, in the Marta del Castillo murder case, in the delimitation of Universal Justice and in the case against Pablo Iglesias about illegal funding.

== Parot doctrine ==
He was speaker and main defender of the Parot doctrine, designed to impose full compliance with the sentences of ETA members and others convicted of serious crimes. Despite having been partially endorsed by the Constitutional Court, the Parot doctrine was appealed by Inés del Río and annulled by the European Court of Human Rights, considering that it violated articles 5.1 and 7 of the European Convention on Human Rights.

== 2017-18 Spanish constitutional crisis ==
On 31 October 2017, the Office of the Prosecutor presented a complaint against the members of the sovereign process of Catalonia after the dissolution of the Parliament of Catalonia; that is, against its president Carme Forcadell and the rest of the members of the Parliamentary Bureau who had voted for the declaration of independence: Anna Simó, Lluís Corominas, Lluís Guinó, Ramona Barrufet i Santacana and Joan Josep Nuet. The Admissions Chamber of the Supreme Court declared itself competent and appointed Llarena as examining magistrate. Among the five members of the Supreme Court who voted in favor of the admission of the complaint by the Prosecutor general, was Sánchez Melgar who, after Maza's death, became head of the Prosecution Ministry.

== See also ==
- Judiciary of Spain
- 2017 Spanish constitutional crisis
- Operation Anubis
