= 2017–2018 Spanish constitutional crisis =

Political conflict over Catalan independence

- Part of the Catalan independence movement
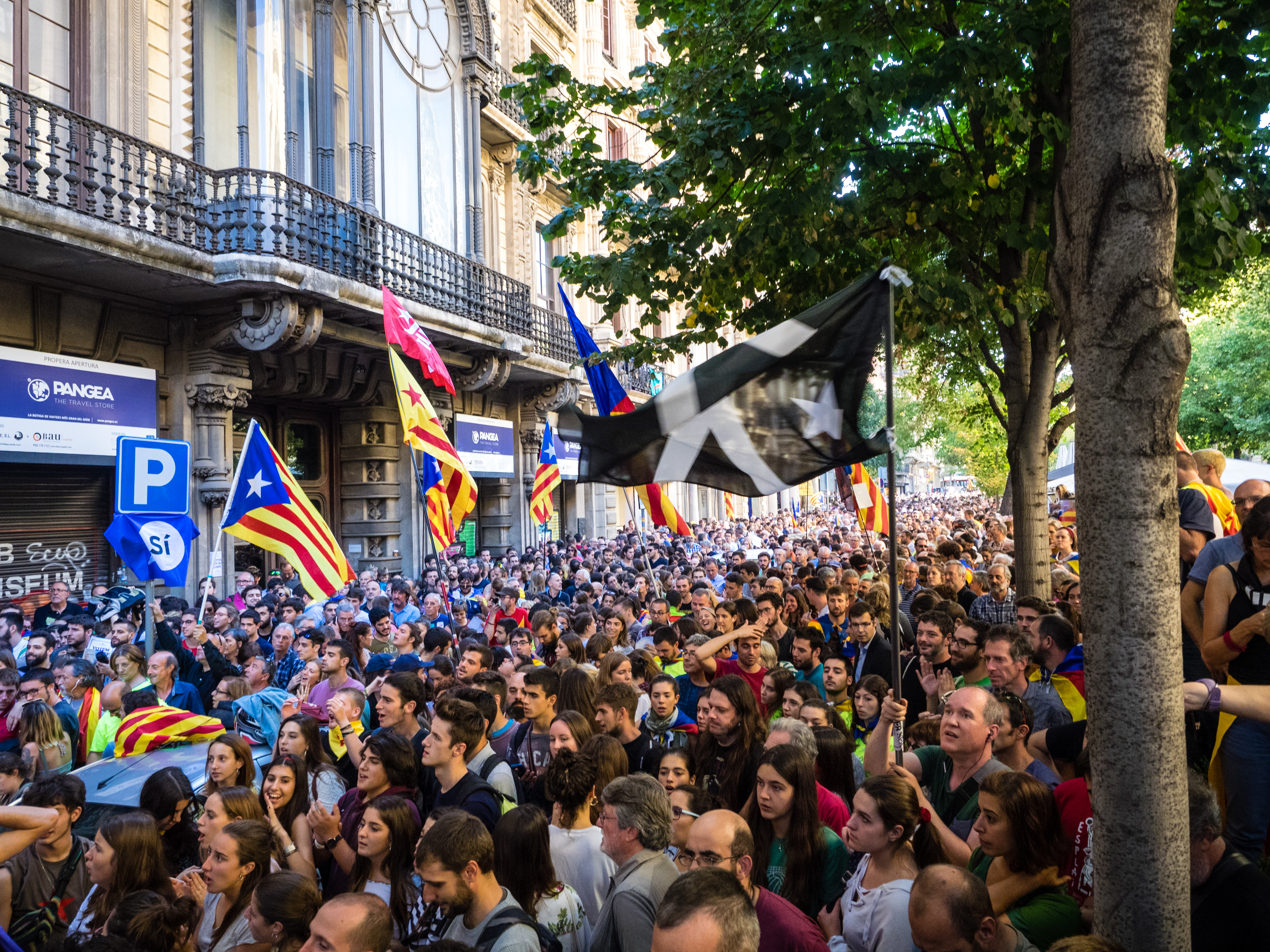
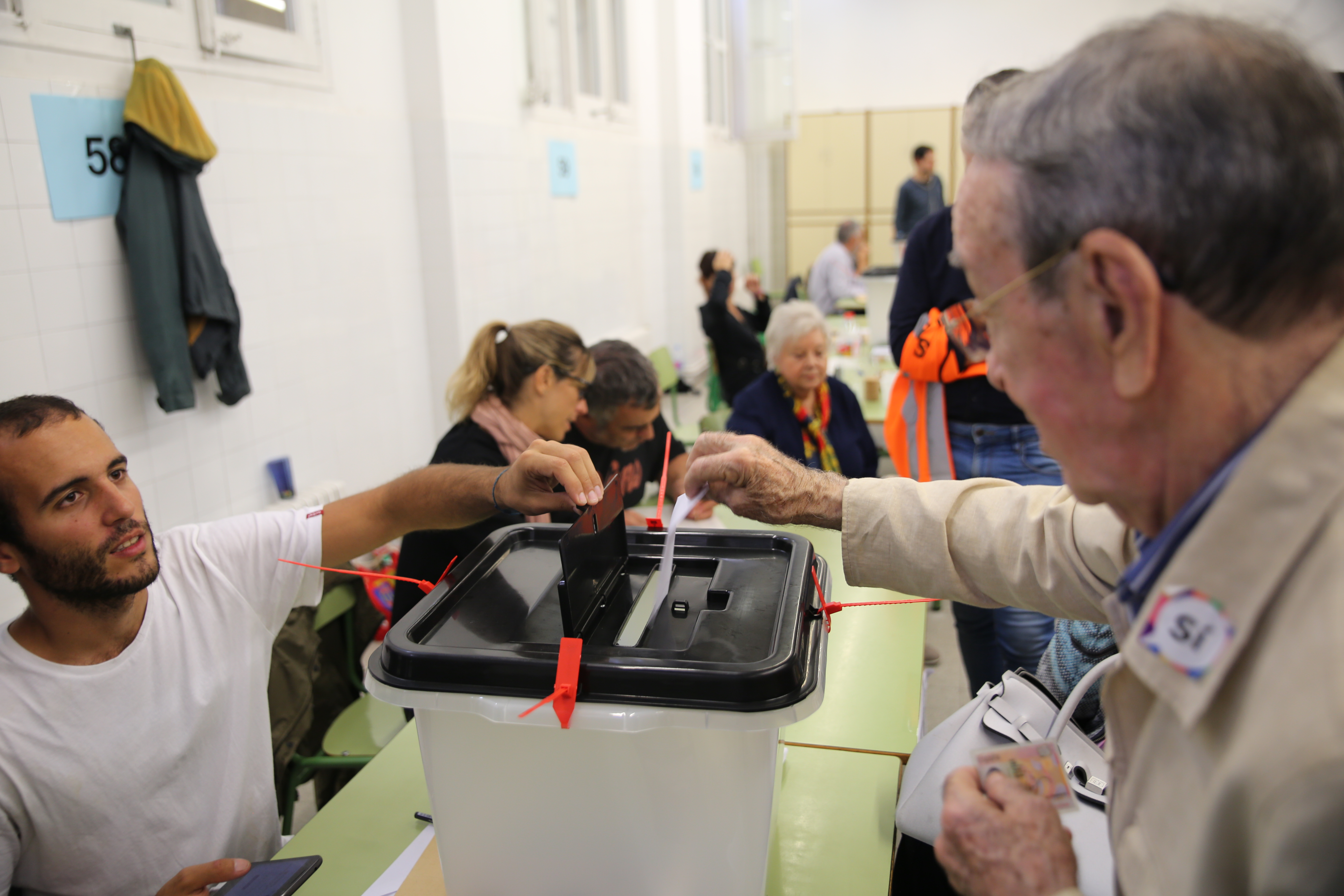
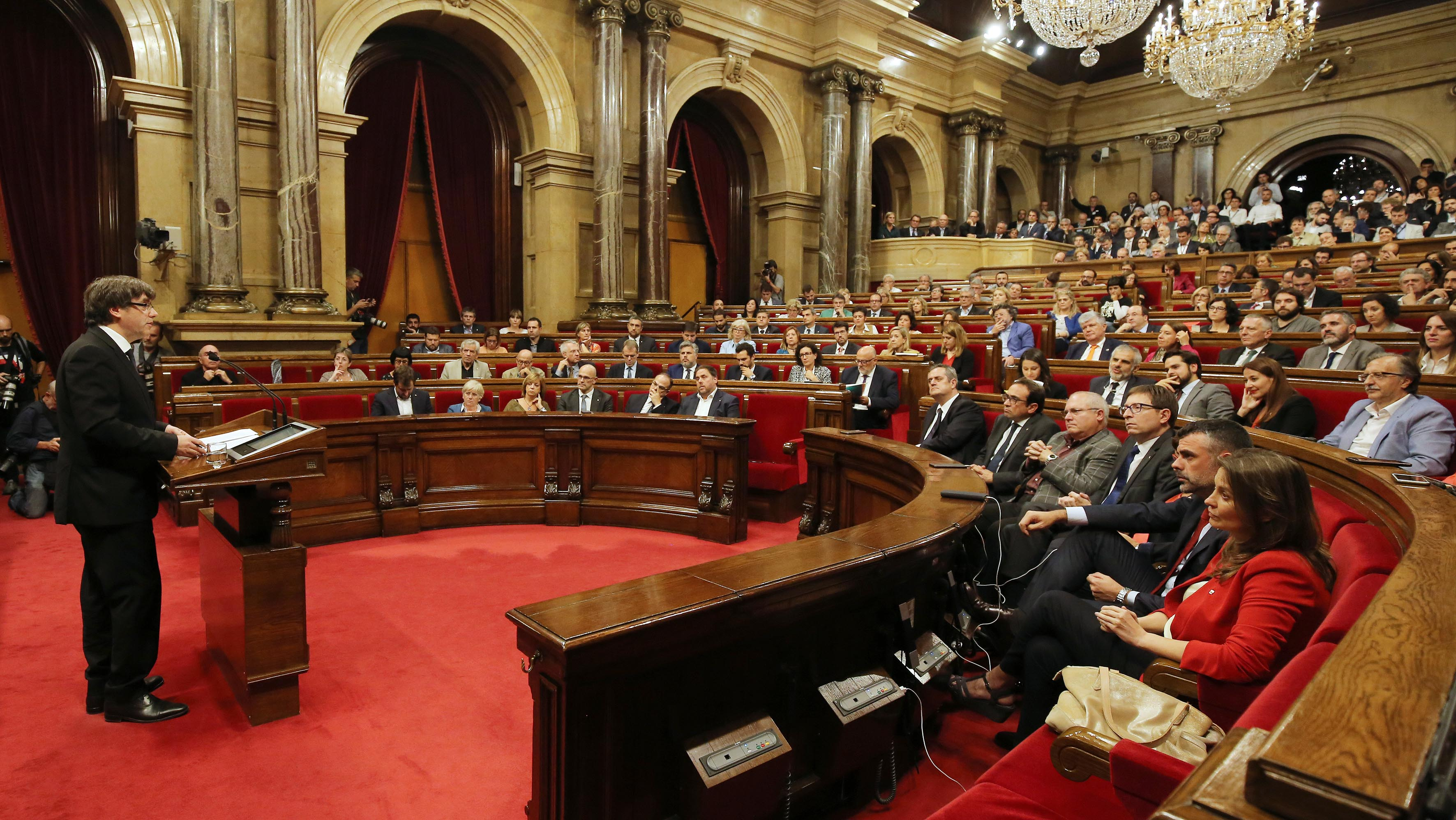
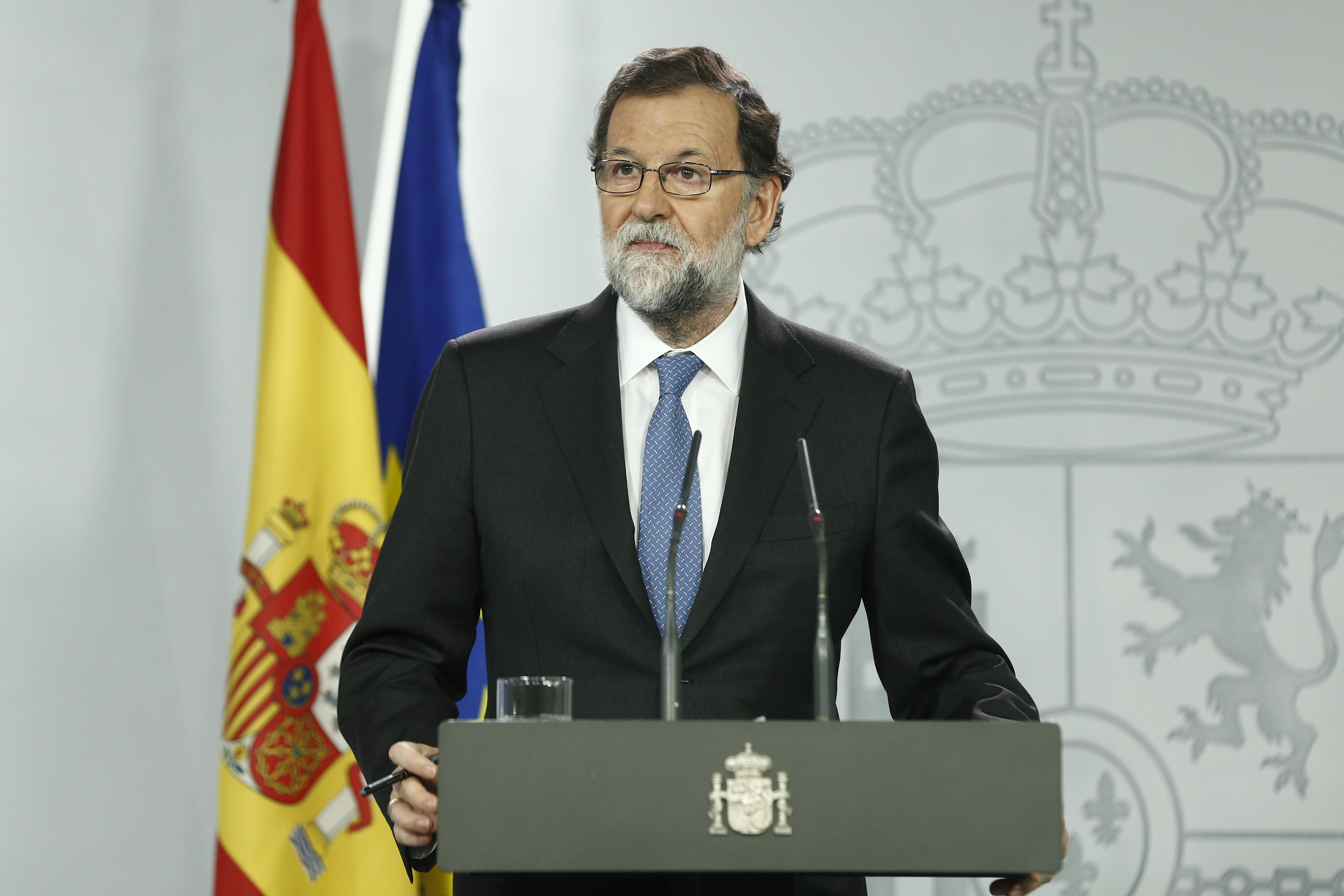
- Crowd protesting in front of the Catalan Ministry for Economy and Finance (top); polling station on 1 October (middle left); President Carles Puigdemont presenting the Catalan declaration of independence (middle right); Prime Minister Mariano Rajoy announcing the enforcement of direct rule (bottom)
- Date: 6 September 2017 – 1 June 2018 (8 months, 3 weeks and 5 days)
- Location: Spain, primarily Catalonia (some events throughout Europe)
- Caused by: Government of Catalonia's refusal to abide by the Constitutional Court's suspension of the 2017 Catalan independence referendum.; Catalan independence movement.
- Methods: Protests, demonstrations, civil disobedience, civil resistance, civil disorder (rioting, vandalism, occupations), general strikes
- Result: Direct rule enforced for six months. Quim Torra elected as the new President of the Generalitat of Catalonia, with the formation of a new Catalan government ending direct rule.; Referendum held despite suspension.; Operation Anubis.; Street protests throughout Catalonia; 2017 Catalan general strike.; Independence unilaterally declared, then annulled by Constitutional Court.; Article 155 of the Constitution enforced and direct rule imposed over Catalonia.; Puigdemont and part of his cabinet flee to Belgium to avoid charges.; Spanish court orders a jail sentence for 8 of Puigdemont's cabinet members (most later released on bail) and EAW against Puigdemont (later withdrawn).; Regional election called for 21 December; plurality for the anti-independence party Cs, but pro-independence parties retain their majority. Total collapse for Rajoy's party.; Political deadlock in the Parliament of Catalonia over investiture. Puigdemont prevented from being elected from abroad; Jordi Sànchez dropping bid as a result of detainment; Jordi Turull charged with rebellion and put under detention after first failed ballot.; EAW against Puigdemont reactivated; Puigdemont was detained in Germany on 25 March 2018.

Parties
Generalitat de Catalunya; Executive Council of Catalonia (Note: Suspended 28 October 2017 – 17 May 2018.); M. Education; M. Economy and Finances; M. Governance; M. Interior; M. Foreign Affairs, Institutional Relations, and Transparency; Parliament of Catalonia (Note: Dissolved 28 October 2017 – 17 January 2018.); Police forces: Mossos d'Esquadra (until 28 October 2017); Parliamentary political groups: Junts pel Sí; PDeCAT; ERC; DC; MES; CUP; Endavant; Poble Lliure; JuntsxCat (from 13 November 2017); Civil organizations: Assemblea Nacional Catalana; Òmnium Cultural; Committees for the Defense of the Republic; Constituent Process	Kingdom of Spain; The Crown; Government of Spain; M. Presidency and for Territorial Administrations; M. Justice; M. Finance and Civil Service; M. Interior; Cortes Generales; Senate of Spain; Judiciary of Spain; Supreme Court; National Court; Attorney General; High Court of Justice of Catalonia; Constitutional Court of Spain; Police forces: National Police Corps; Police Intervention Units; Civil Guard; Mossos d'Esquadra (since 28 October 2017); Municipal Police Corps; Barcelona Urban Guard; Parliamentary political groups: PP (incl. PPC); PSOE (incl. PSC); Cs; Civil organizations: Societat Civil Catalana

Lead figures
Carles Puigdemont; Oriol Junqueras (detainee); Joaquim Forn (detainee); Jordi Turull (detainee); Carme Forcadell (detainee); Josep Lluís Trapero (until 28 October 2017); Anna Gabriel; Carles Riera; Roger Torrent (from 17 January 2018); Quim Torra (from 17 May 2018); Jordi Sànchez (detainee); Jordi Cuixart (detainee); Elisenda Paluzie (since 24 March 2018)	King Felipe VI; Mariano Rajoy; Soraya Sáenz de Santamaría; Rafael Catalá; Cristóbal Montoro; Juan Ignacio Zoido; José Manuel Maza (until 18 November 2017) #; Julián Sánchez Melgar (2017–2018); Diego Pérez de los Cobos; Pedro Sánchez; Albert Rivera; Inés Arrimadas; Miquel Iceta; Xavier García Albiol

Number
Catalan police force: 17,000 (until 28 October 2017)	Police detachment in Catalonia: 12,000; Catalan police force: 17,000 (from 28 October 2017)

Casualties and losses
Civilians injured: 1,066 (according to the Catalan Health Department); Detained: 18 (in Catalonia); Arrested: 10	Agents injured: 111 (according to the Spanish Ministry of the Interior); 12 (according to the Catalan Health Department)
- Jordi Sànchez and Jordi Cuixart were both arrested on 17 October 2017. Senior Generalitat figures were officially dismissed from office on 28 October 2017 after direct rule was enforced.

A constitutional crisis took place in Spain from 2017 to 2018 as the result of a political conflict between the Government of Spain and the Generalitat de Catalunya under the then-President Carles Puigdemont—the government of the autonomous community of Catalonia until 28 October 2017—over the issue of Catalan independence. It started after the law intending to allow the 2017 Catalan independence referendum was denounced by the Spanish government under Prime Minister Mariano Rajoy and subsequently suspended by the Constitutional Court until it ruled on the issue. Some international media outlets have described the events as "one of the worst political crises in modern Spanish history".

Puigdemont's government announced that neither central Spanish authorities nor the courts would halt their plans and that it intended to hold the vote anyway, sparking a legal backlash that quickly spread from the Spanish and Catalan governments to Catalan municipalities—as local mayors were urged by the Generalitat to provide logistical support and help for the electoral process to be carried out—, as well as to the Constitutional Court, the High Court of Justice of Catalonia and state prosecutors. By 15 September, as pro-Catalan independence parties began their referendum campaigns, the Spanish government had launched an all-out legal offensive to thwart the upcoming vote, including threats of a financial takeover of much of the Catalan budget, police seizing pro-referendum posters, pamphlets and leaflets which had been regarded as illegal and criminal investigations ordered on the over 700 local mayors who had publicly agreed to help stage the referendum. Tensions between the two sides reached a critical point after Spanish police raided the Catalan government headquarters in Barcelona on 20 September, at the start of Operation Anubis, and arrested fourteen senior Catalan officials. This led to protests outside the Catalan economy department which saw Civil Guard officers trapped inside the building for hours and several vehicles vandalized. The referendum was eventually held, albeit without meeting minimum standards for elections and amid low turnout and a police crackdown ended with hundreds injured. The Spanish Ministry of Internal Affairs reported that up to 431 officers had been injured, bruised, or even bitten.

On 10 October, Puigdemont ambiguously declared and suspended independence during a speech in the Parliament of Catalonia, arguing his move was directed at entering talks with Spain. The Spanish government required Puigdemont to clarify whether he had declared independence or not, to which it received no clear answer. A further requirement was met with an implicit threat from the Generalitat that it would lift the suspension on the independence declaration if Spain "continued its repression", in response to the imprisonment of the leaders of pro-independence Catalan National Assembly (ANC) and Òmnium Cultural, accused of sedition by the National Court because of their involvement in the 20 September events. On 21 October, it was announced by Prime Minister Rajoy that Article 155 of the Spanish Constitution would be invoked, leading to direct rule over Catalonia by the Spanish government once approved by the Senate.

On 27 October, the Catalan parliament voted in a secret ballot to unilaterally declare independence from Spain, with most deputies of the opposition boycotting a vote considered illegal for violating the decisions of the Constitutional Court of Spain, as the lawyers of the Parliament of Catalonia warned. As a result, the government of Spain invoked the Constitution to remove the regional authorities and enforce direct rule the next day, with a regional election being subsequently called for 21 December 2017 to elect a new Parliament of Catalonia. Puigdemont and part of his cabinet fled to Belgium after being ousted, as the Spanish Attorney General pressed for charges of sedition, rebellion and misuse of public funds against them.

== Background ==
The recent increase in support for Catalan independence has its roots in a Constitutional Court ruling in 2010, which struck down parts of the regional 2006 Statute of Autonomy that granted new powers of self-rule to the region. The ruling came after four years of deliberation concerning a constitutional appeal filed by the conservative People's Party (PP) under Mariano Rajoy—then the country's second-largest party, in opposition to the government of José Luis Rodríguez Zapatero's Spanish Socialist Workers' Party—and was met with anger and street protests in Catalonia. Shortly afterward the PP took power in Spain, and after a massive independence demonstration took place in Barcelona on 11 September 2012—Catalonia's National Day—the Catalan government under Artur Mas called a snap regional election and set out to initiate Catalonia's process towards independence.

After a pro-independence coalition formed by the Junts pel Sí alliance and the Popular Unity Candidacy won a slim majority in the Parliament in the 2015 regional election, Carles Puigdemont replaced Mas as President of the Generalitat. Puigdemont promised to organise a binding independence referendum based on results from a multi-question, non-binding vote in 2014, when about 80% of those who voted were believed to have backed independence for the region, and up to 91.8% supported Catalonia becoming a state—albeit on an estimated turnout around or below 40%. The Catalan government invoked the right of people to self-determination and Catalonia's political, economical and cultural background to back up its proposal for a referendum on Catalan independence. The Government of Spain, now with Mariano Rajoy as Prime Minister, opposed such a vote, arguing that any referendum on Catalan independence would go against the country's 1978 Constitution, as it made no provision for a vote on self-determination.

On 9 June 2017, Puigdemont announced that the planned independence referendum would be held on 1 October the same year. The Catalan government criticised the attitude of the Spanish government in refusing to negotiate a referendum and accused it of behaving undemocratically.

== Start of crisis ==
=== Referendum suspended ===
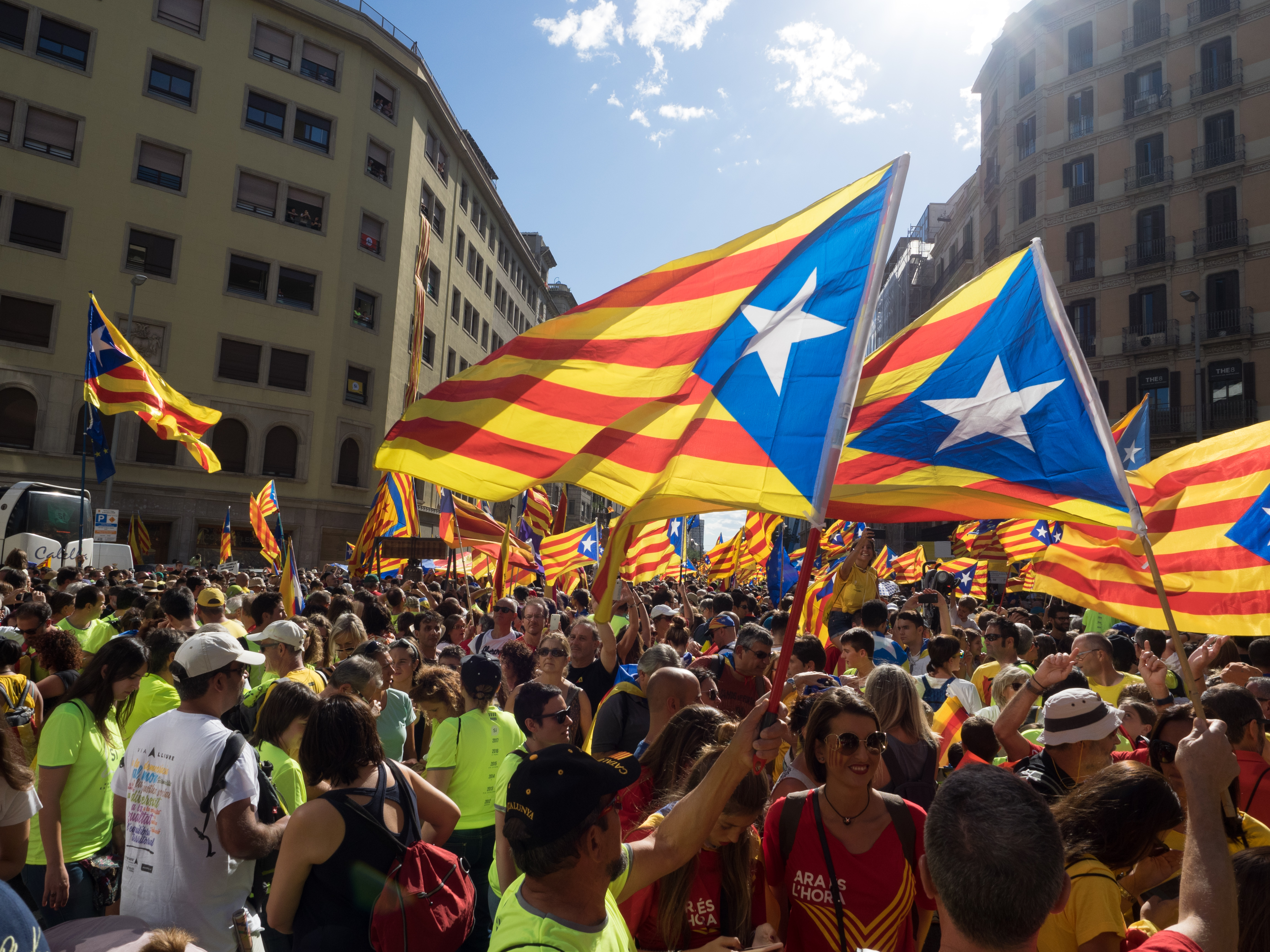
Pro-independence supporters during a rally on 11 September 2017

On 6 September 2017, the ruling Junts pel Sí (JxSí) coalition and its parliamentary partner, the Popular Unity Candidacy (CUP), passed the Law on the Referendum on Self-determination of Catalonia in the Parliament of Catalonia that was to provide the legal framework for the intended independence referendum scheduled for 1 October. The way in which the law had been pushed through Parliament and the clear unconstitutionality of the law became an issue of controversy. Catalan opposition parties accused JxSí and CUP of fast-tracking the law through parliament, not allowing them to appeal the law before being put up to vote. In 2018, the Constitutional Court ruled that the rights of the opposition were indeed undermined. Shortly after the parliamentary vote, in which most of the opposition MPs walked out from the chamber without voting on the bill, the Catalan regional government signed the decree calling the referendum. On 7 September and under a similar procedure as the previous day, pro-independence lawmakers in the Parliament of Catalonia passed the Law of transitional jurisprudence and foundation of the Republic, aimed at superseding the Spanish Constitution and the Statute of Autonomy of Catalonia with a new legal framework should a simple majority vote 'Yes' to the independence choice with no minimum participation required. Besides its unconstitutional character, the law was criticized for being approved with a simple majority, in contrast with the two thirds needed to reform the Statute of Autonomy or the Spanish Constitution, the generous control it afforded the executive power over the new judicial branch and the extensive degree of immunity offered to the president of the new republic.

The People's Party-led Spanish government under Prime Minister Mariano Rajoy announced that it would appeal the bill to the Constitutional Court, which agreed to hear all four of its unconstitutionality appeals and subsequently suspended the law and the referendum until it could rule upon the matter. Despite the referendum suspension, the Catalan government announced it would proceed with the vote anyway. This prompted Attorney General José Manuel Maza to ask security forces to investigate possible preparations from the Catalan government to hold the vote, as well as announcing he would present criminal charges against members of both the regional parliament and government for voting and signing off the referendum. The national government proceeded to deploy a series of legal measures intended to nullify the referendum, while also warning local councils in Catalonia to either impede or paralyse efforts to carry out the vote. Previously, local mayors had been given 48 hours by the regional government to confirm the availability of polling stations for 1 October.

Within the next two days, nearly 74% of Catalan municipalities—comprising about 43% of the Catalan population—had agreed to provide the necessary polling stations for the referendum, whereas many of the most-populated urban areas—representing 24% of Catalan inhabitants—had voiced their opposition to the vote. The largest city and capital of Catalonia, Barcelona—accounting for about 20% of the region's population—was caught in the middle, with its local mayor, Ada Colau, refusing to make a statement whether the municipality would provide logistic support to the referendum or not while rejecting putting public servants at risk; she, however, voiced her support for the people's right to vote in a fair and legal referendum. Concurrently, President of Catalonia Carles Puigdemont, Vice-president Oriol Junqueras, the entire Catalan government as well as parliamentary officials allowing the referendum law to be put to vote in Parliament—including Parliament Speaker Carme Forcadell—faced charges of disobedience, misusing public funds and making deliberately unlawful decisions as elected officials as the High Court of Justice of Catalonia agreed to hear the criminal complaints filled by state prosecutors.

=== Judicial and police action ===
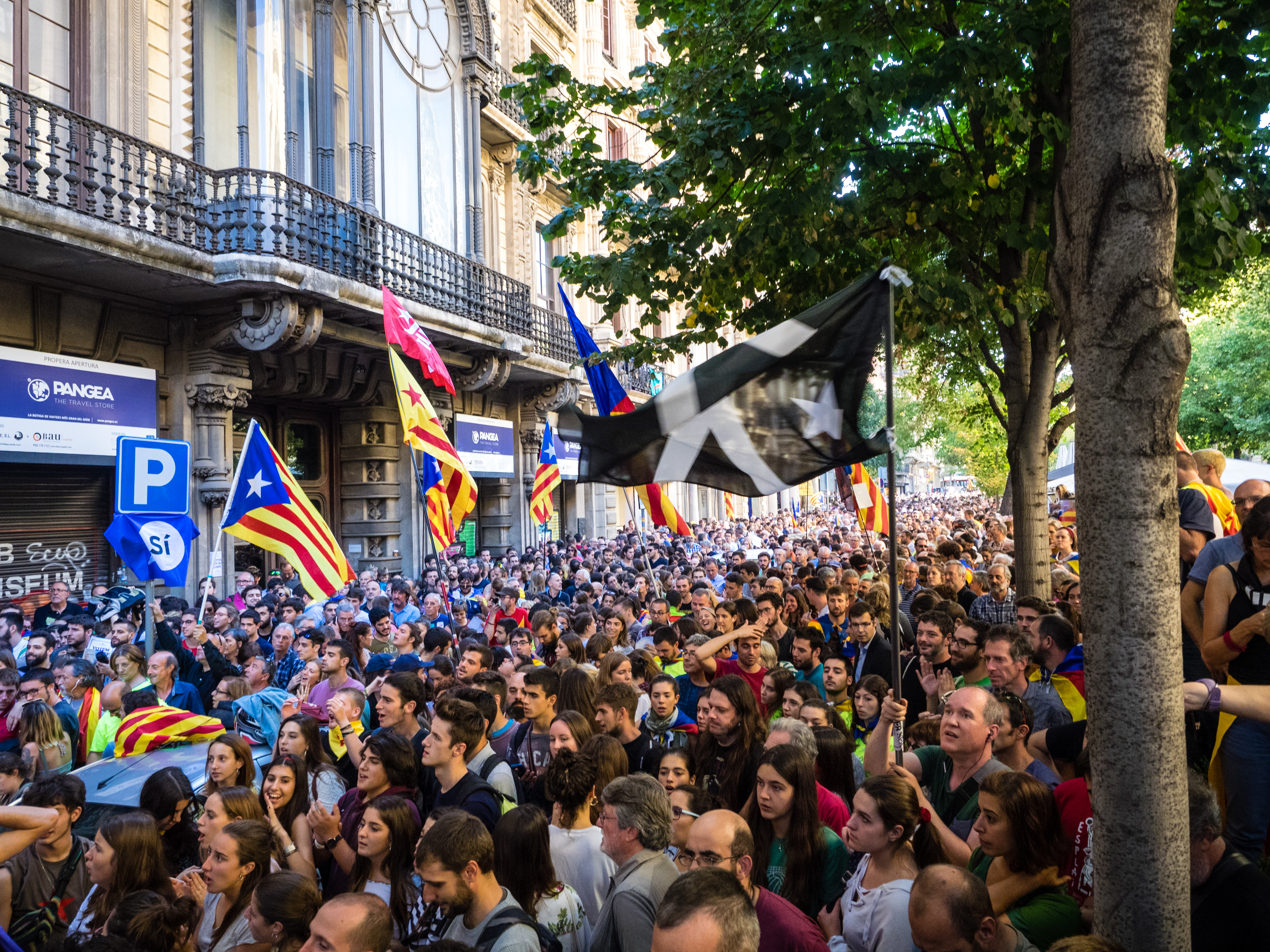
Protests in Barcelona after the arrest of fourteen Catalan government officials on 20 September.

On 8 September the Attorney General of Catalonia, José María Romero de Tejada, presented two complaints to the High Court of Justice of Catalonia (TSJC) against the Government and the Bureau of Parliament for crimes of disobedience, prevarication and misappropriation of public funds, as announced the day before by the Attorney General José Manuel Maza. These complaints included the guarantee request for the members of the Government as well as a request for a notification to all mayors of Catalonia to prevent any "personal or material resource, including local" resources being provided for the celebration of referendum. The court was also asked to notify the Catalan media managers of the prohibition of inserting institutional advertising or propaganda of the referendum.

These complaints were admitted by the TSJC on 14 September without accepting the request for a deposit for the members of the Government.

A decision on 13 September from Spain's public prosecutors to order a criminal probe of all local mayors who had publicly announced they would help stage the independence referendum—totalling over 700—came the day after the Constitutional Court had accepted the Spanish government's request to suspend the second of the two laws that had been approved by the secessionist majority in the Catalan parliament the previous week. The probe meant that prosecutors could choose to present criminal charges—or even arrest, if failing to answer the summons—local mayors who disobeyed the Constitutional Court's ruling. As part of a series of moves to block the Catalan referendum, prosecutors had also instructed police officials to seize ballot boxes, election flyers and other items that could be of use in the illegal vote, whereas the Constitutional Court had instructed regional government officials to show how they were preventing the vote from going ahead within a 48-hour deadline. In response, the Catalan government sent a letter to Treasury Minister Cristóbal Montoro announcing that it would stop sending weekly financial accounts to Spain's central government, a previously established obligation that was meant to verify whether the region was using public money for the promotion of its independence drive as well as a requirement for the region's access to a funding programme to autonomous communities established in 2012. The Spanish government then proceeded to take direct control of most of Catalonia's invoice payments.

In a search on 19 September, Spanish police seized significant election material which had been in store by referendum organizers at the offices of a private delivery company in Terrassa. These included voting cards contained in envelopes with the Catalan government's logo. The next day, the Civil Guard raided Generalitat offices and arrested fourteen senior officials from the Catalan government—most notably, these included Josep Maria Jové, deputy to regional Vice-president Oriol Junqueras. This came after mayors from towns supporting the referendum were questioned in court by state prosecutors. Regional premier Carles Puigdemont condemned the actions as "anti-democratic and totalitarian", accusing the Spanish government of 'de facto' imposing a state of emergency and of suspending Catalonia's autonomy after it took effective control over Catalan finances. Public protests occurred in Barcelona after news of the arrests emerged, with left-wing political party Podemos and Barcelona mayor Ada Colau joining the growing criticism of Mariano Rajoy's government crackdown on public servants, dubbing it as an "authoritarian regression". The previous day, the Congress of Deputies had voted down a motion from Ciudadanos to support the Spanish government's response to the referendum, which was rejected by 166 votes to 158. Rajoy defended his government's actions in that "What we're seeing in Catalonia is an attempt to eliminate the constitution and the autonomous statute of Catalonia... Logically, the state has to react. There is no democratic state in the world that would accept what these people are trying to do. They've been warned and they know the referendum can't take place". Rajoy also called for the Catalonia government to give up its "escalation of radicalism and disobedience", calling for them to "Go back to the law and democracy" and dubbing the referendum a "chimera", as tens of thousands gathered in the streets of Barcelona and other Catalan cities to protest police actions. The Spanish government did not rule out invoking Article 155 of the Spanish Constitution, which would allow the central government to adopt "the necessary measures to compel regional authorities to obey the law"—in practice, allowing for the autonomy's effective suspension and direct rule of the region.

On 21 September, the Catalan government acknowledged that the raid and arrests in the previous day severely hampered the referendum's logistics by preventing any alternative election data centre to be established in time for the vote to take place. Nonetheless, Catalan Vice-president Junqueras called for people to turn out and mobilise on 1 October, turning the social response into a "censure motion to Rajoy", stating that "If there is any possibility of change in Spain, democracy must triumph in Catalonia". As street protests continued throughout Catalonia, additional police reinforcements were sent by the Spanish government to block any moves to hold the referendum on 1 October. Spanish prosecutors formally accused some protesters in Barcelona of sedition, after several Civil Guard patrol cars had been vandalised on Wednesday night. By 23 September, the Spanish government announced that the Mossos d'Esquadra—the regional police force—were to be subordinated to a single command dependent of the Spanish government and that the Interior Ministry would assume co-ordination over all security forces in Catalonia. The previous day, several hundred students had announced a permanent occupation of the historic building of the University of Barcelona, protesting the state's actions.

== Development ==
=== Referendum and subsequent events ===
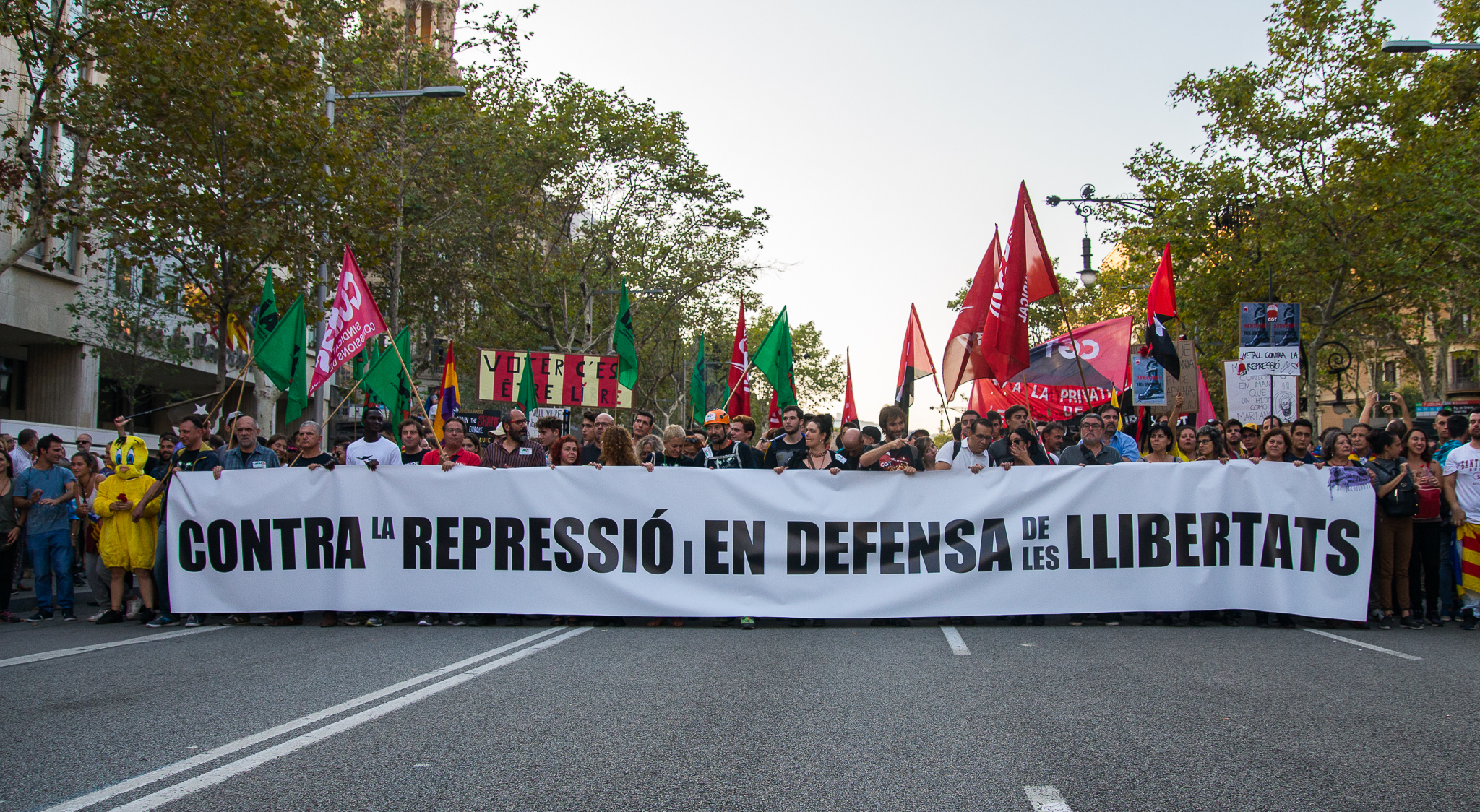
Demonstration in Barcelona during the general strike held in Catalonia on 3 October 2017.

Despite the suspension, the Catalan referendum was held on 1 October 2017, as scheduled by the Generalitat. The absention rate was 58%, with the 2,044,038 voters in favour of independence amounting to 39% of all 5,313,564 registered voters. Over 12,000 officers from the National Police Corps and the Civil Guard were deployed throughout Catalonia in an effort to close off polling stations and seize all election material to prevent the vote from taking place. The Spanish government was forced to call off police raids after clashes with protesters resulted in two people seriously injured, one for a gum ball shot against the eye and the other one due to a heart attack. 893 civilians and 111 agents of the Nacional Police and the Civil Guard were reported to have been injured. According to some Spanish media these previously reported figures may have been exaggerated. The Guardian's columnist, Peter Preston, said the number of injured "hadn't been independently checked" while he still described the police action as "violent and frightening".

However, the Official College of Doctors of Barcelona (Col·legi de Metges de Barcelona) stated that "professionalism and independence of doctors can not be questioned because they act under a deontological code to attend and diagnose patients". The judge who is currently investigating the accusations of police violence had already identified 218 people injured on 10 October, 20 of whom were police officers.

The events of 1 October sparked a public outcry in Catalonia, with hundreds of thousands taking to the streets to protest Spanish police violence.

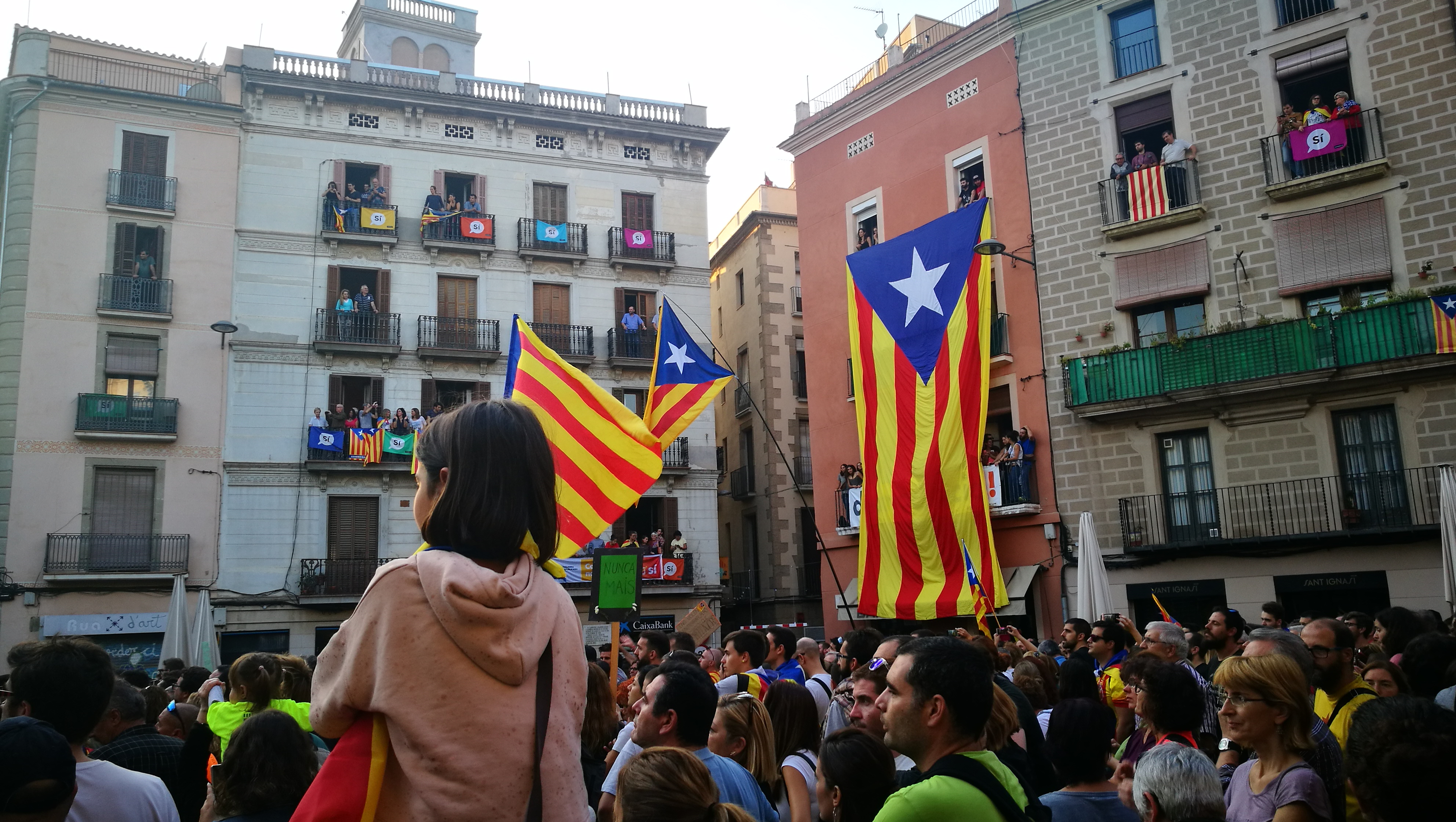
Demonstration in Manresa on 3 October 2017.

On 3 October 2017, as huge protest rallies and a general strike took place in Catalonia, King Felipe VI delivered an unusually strongly worded televised address in which he condemned the referendum organizers for acting "outside the law", accusing them of "unacceptable disloyalty" and of "eroding the harmony and co-existence within Catalan society itself". He also warned the referendum could put the economy of the entire north-east region of Spain at risk. Reactions to the King's speech were mixed. Party officials from the PP and Ciudadanos praised the King's "commitment to legality", whereas leaders from Unidos Podemos and Catalunya en Comú criticised it as "unworthy and irresponsible", paving the way for a harsh intervention in Catalan autonomy. PSOE's leaders expressed support for the King's words in public, but were reported to be privately dissatisfied that the King had not made any call to encourage understanding or dialogue between the Spanish and Catalan governments. On 5 October the Constitutional Court of Spain suspended a future session of the Catalan Parliament (scheduled for 9 October) that had been planned to push for a Declaration of Independence.

On 5 October, Banco Sabadell, the second-largest bank based in Catalonia, announced its decision to move its legal headquarters out of the region amid economic uncertainty over the future of Catalonia's political situation ahead of a projected unilateral declaration of independence the ensuing week, which had seen sharp falls in the group's share prices the previous day and rating agencies downgrading the region. Concurrently, CaixaBank, the biggest bank in the region and the third largest in Spain, also announced it was considering redomiciling outside Catalonia. This sparked a massive business exit in the ensuing hours, with companies such as Abertis, Gas Natural, Grifols, Fersa Energias Renovables, Agbar, Freixenet, Codorníu, Idilia Foods, San Miguel Beer and Planeta Group also announcing or considering their intention to move their HQs out of Catalonia. The Spanish government announced on Friday 6 October that it would issue a decree allowing companies based in Catalonia to move out of the region without holding a shareholders' meeting. On 11 October, Château de Montsoreau-Museum of Contemporary Art announced that it was repatriating its collection of Art & Language works on loan at Barcelona Museum of Contemporary Art (MACBA) since 2010. Within two weeks, more than 1,000 business and firms would move out of Catalonia.

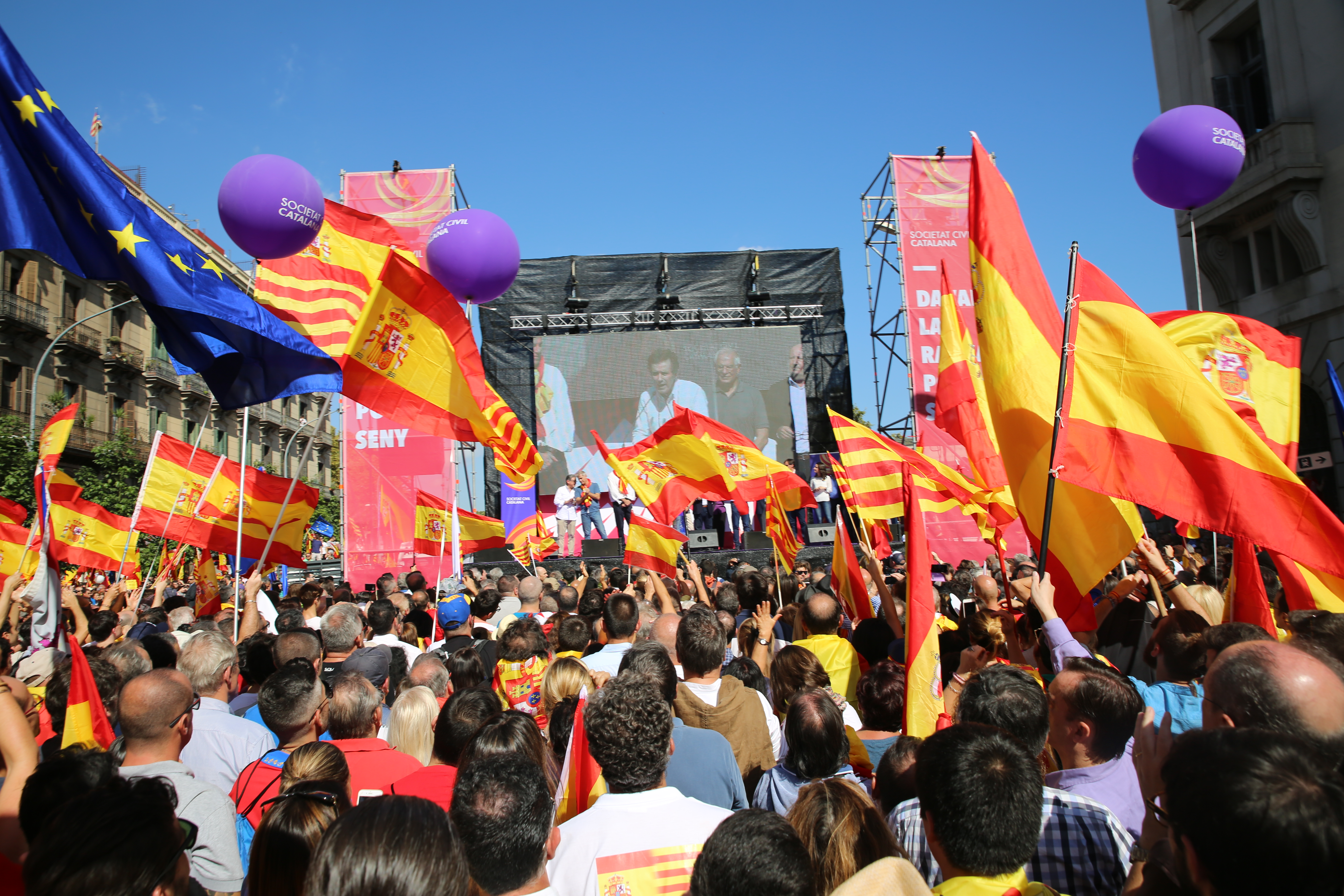
Demonstration against Catalan independence in Barcelona on 8 October 2017

On 7 October, tens of thousands of demonstrators rallied in Madrid and Barcelona dressed in white and without flags with the slogan 'Shall we talk?', asking for a deescalation of the political conflict. On 8 October, the largest demonstration against Catalan independence in recent Spanish history took place in Barcelona, the local police estimating at about 400,000 the number of participants. Later High Representative of the European Union Josep Borrell, Nobel Prize winner Mario Vargas Llosa and several representatives of the opposition parties in the Catalan parliament delivered speeches against the independence process.

Simultaneously, pro-unity groups increasingly took to the streets throughout Spain, with some gatherings leading to scuffles in Barcelona and Valencia. The Mossos d'Esquadra were put under investigation for disobedience, accused of not complying with a command from the High Court of Justice of Catalonia to prevent the referendum and with their passivity allowing polling stations to open.

In an ambiguous speech during a parliamentary session in the Parliament of Catalonia on 10 October, Puigdemont declared that "Catalonia had earned the right to be an independent state" and that he defended "the mandate of the people of Catalonia to become an independent republic". However, he immediately announced that parliament would suspend a formal declaration of independence in order to pursue dialogue with the Spanish government. Puigdemont and other pro-independence deputies then signed a symbolic declaration of independence with no legal effect. Puigdemont's move came after pressure resulting from the business exit on the previous days as well as pleas from Barcelona's mayor Ada Colau and European Council President Donald Tusk urging him to step back from declaring independence. This was met with disappointment from thousands of pro-independence supporters who had gathered nearby to watch the session on giant screens, as well as criticism from the CUP, who voiced their discontent at Puigdemont's decision not to proclaim a Catalan republic right away and did not rule out abandoning the Parliament until the signed declaration of independence was effective.

On 17 October, the National Court ordered Jordi Sànchez and Jordi Cuixart—leaders of pro-independence groups Catalan National Assembly (ANC) and Òmnium Cultural—to be preventively put into jail without bail pending an investigation into alleged sedition for having played central roles in orchestrating massive protests aimed at hindering Civil Guard activity. They were accused of leading the protest of tens of thousands of people that surrounded the Catalan economy department offices on 20–21 September 2017 heeding a call made by Òmnium Cultural and ANC, during which three vehicles of the Civil Guard were vandalised and their occupants forced to flee into the Economy Department building, a court clerk remained trapped until midnight inside the building and had to flee by the roof, while several agents were trapped throughout the night as demonstrators shouted outside "You won't get out!". The Civil Guard agents cornered into the building made 6 calls for help to the autonomous police force of Catalonia Mossos d'Esquadra which were ignored, the first of them performed at 9:14 am with the subject: "Urgent - Request for support to Mossos". According to the judge the actions of Sànchez and Cruixat are into the scope of sedition, a felony regulated by the article 544 and subsequents of the Spanish Criminal Code:

Conviction for sedition shall befall those who, without being included in the felony of rebellion, public and tumultuously rise up to prevent, by force or outside the legal channels, application of the laws, or any authority, official corporation or public officer from lawful exercise of the duties thereof or implementation of the resolutions thereof, or of administrative or judicial resolutions.

— Article 544 of the Spanish Criminal Code.

Pro-independence politicians and organizations, including Catalan President Carles Puigdemont, have referred to Cuixart and Sànchez as political prisoners. The Spanish Justice Minister Rafael Catalá argued that they were not "political prisoners" but "imprisoned politicians". An article published in El País argued that according to the criteria established by the Parliamentary Assembly of the Council of Europe (PACE) Sànchez and Cuixart could not be considered "political prisoners". Amnesty International issued an official statement considering the charge of sedition and the preventive imprisonment as "excessive" and called for their immediate release, but several days later made it clear that it did not consider them "political prisoners". Some Catalan media, such as La Vanguardia, reported that footage from the incident showed Cuixart and Sànchez trying to call off the protests, contradicting that part of the judicial order imprisoning them which said that they had not tried "to call off the demonstration".

=== Independence declaration and direct rule ===
On 11 October, after a special cabinet meeting intended to address the events on the previous day, Prime Minister Mariano Rajoy announced he was formally requiring the Catalan government to confirm whether it had declared independence before 16 October at 10 am, with a further 3-day deadline until 19 October to revoke all deemed illegal acts if an affirmative answer—or no answer at all—was obtained. This requirement was a formal requisite needed to trigger article 155 of the Spanish Constitution, a so-called "nuclear option" that would allow the Spanish government to suspend Catalonia's political autonomy and impose direct rule from Madrid. Pressure mounted within the pro-independence coalition as the Popular Unity Candidacy (CUP) demanded an unambiguous affirmation of Catalan independence, threatening to withdraw its parliamentary support from Puigdemont's government if he rescinded his independence claim. In his formal response to Rajoy's requirement hurrying the initial five-day deadline, Puigdemont failed to clarify whether independence had been declared and instead called for negotiations over the following two months. The Spanish government replied that this was not a valid response to its requirement and doubted that Puigdemont's offer for dialogue was sincere due to his lack of "clarity". The refusal from the Catalan government to either confirm or deny independence triggered a second deadline for them to backtrack before direct rule was imposed. The Spanish government subsequently offered to abort the incoming move to suspend self-rule if the Catalan government called for a regional election, but this was ruled out by the latter.

If a self-governing community does not fulfil the obligations imposed upon it by the constitution or other laws, or acts in a way that is seriously prejudicial to the general interest of Spain, the government may take all measures necessary to compel the community to meet said obligations, or to protect the above-mentioned general interest.

— Article 155 of the Spanish Constitution of 1978.

On 19 October, Prime Minister Mariano Rajoy confirmed that the Spanish government would trigger Article 155 and move to suspend Catalonia's autonomy after a cabinet meeting scheduled for 21 October, following a letter from Puigdemont in which he said that the independence declaration remained suspended but that the Catalan parliament could choose to vote on it if Spain continued its "repression". Subsequently, Rajoy announced the Spanish government would take direct control over the Generalitat of Catalonia, proceeding to remove Puigdemont and the entire Catalan government from their offices and call a regional election within six months, pending Senate approval.

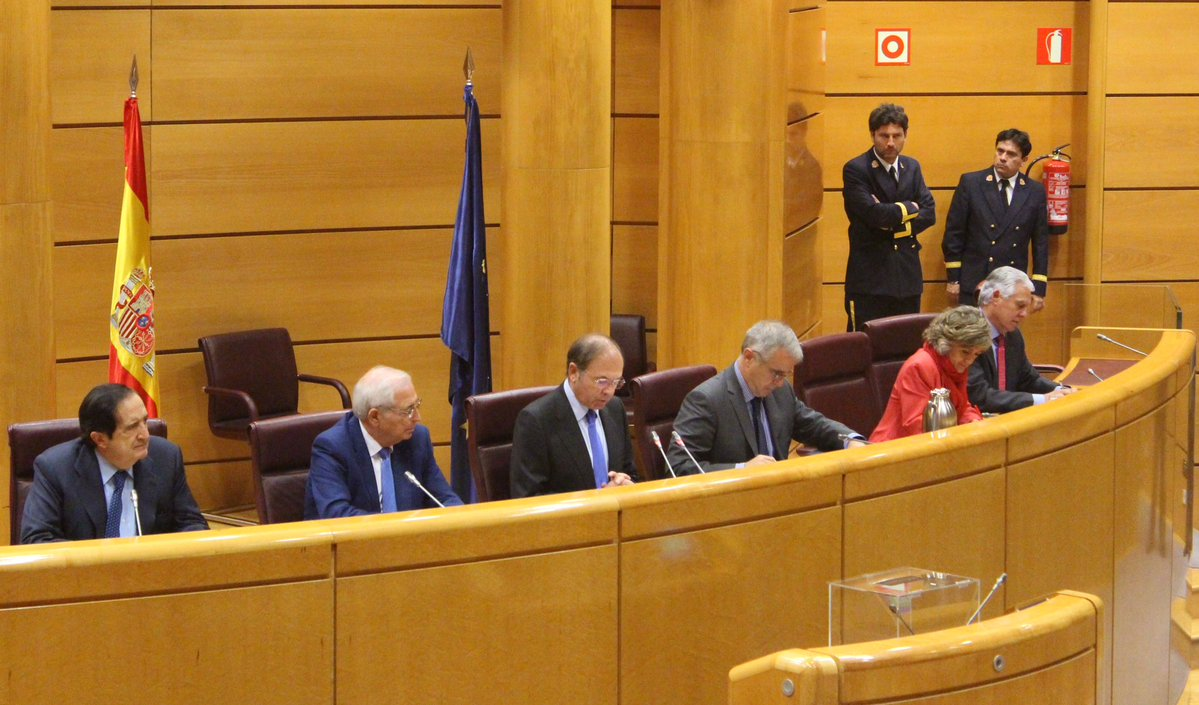
Special Senate Commission on the Invocation of Article 155 of the Spanish Constitution (presidency).

On 26 October, one day ahead of the scheduled enforcement of Article 155 by the Spanish Senate, it was announced that Puigdemont had chosen to dissolve the Parliament of Catalonia within the coming hours and call for an emergency snap election on or around 20 December in order to prevent direct rule from Madrid. This move sparked an outcry within pro-independence ranks, as they wished to hold a vote for a unilateral declaration of independence in response to the Spanish government's move to trigger Article 155. In the end Puigdemont chose not to dissolve Parliament, allegedly because of the Spanish government's refusal to call off the Article 155 procedure even though an election was called by Puigdemont. A debate over a possible declaration of independence then went ahead as planned in the Parliament of Catalonia later that day and into the next morning, simultaneous to the Spanish Senate debating the enforcement of Article 155. At the end of the debate, the Catalan parliament voted for a unilateral declaration of independence, by secret ballot, which was backed 70–10, with two MPs casting a blank ballot, with all MPs from Citizens, the Socialists' Party of Catalonia and the People's Party boycotting the vote because of its illegality for violating the decisions of the Constitutional Court of Spain, as the lawyers of the Parliament of Catalonia warned. Soon after that, the Senate of Spain approved the activation of article 155 of the Constitution for Catalonia in a 214–47 vote, with one abstention.

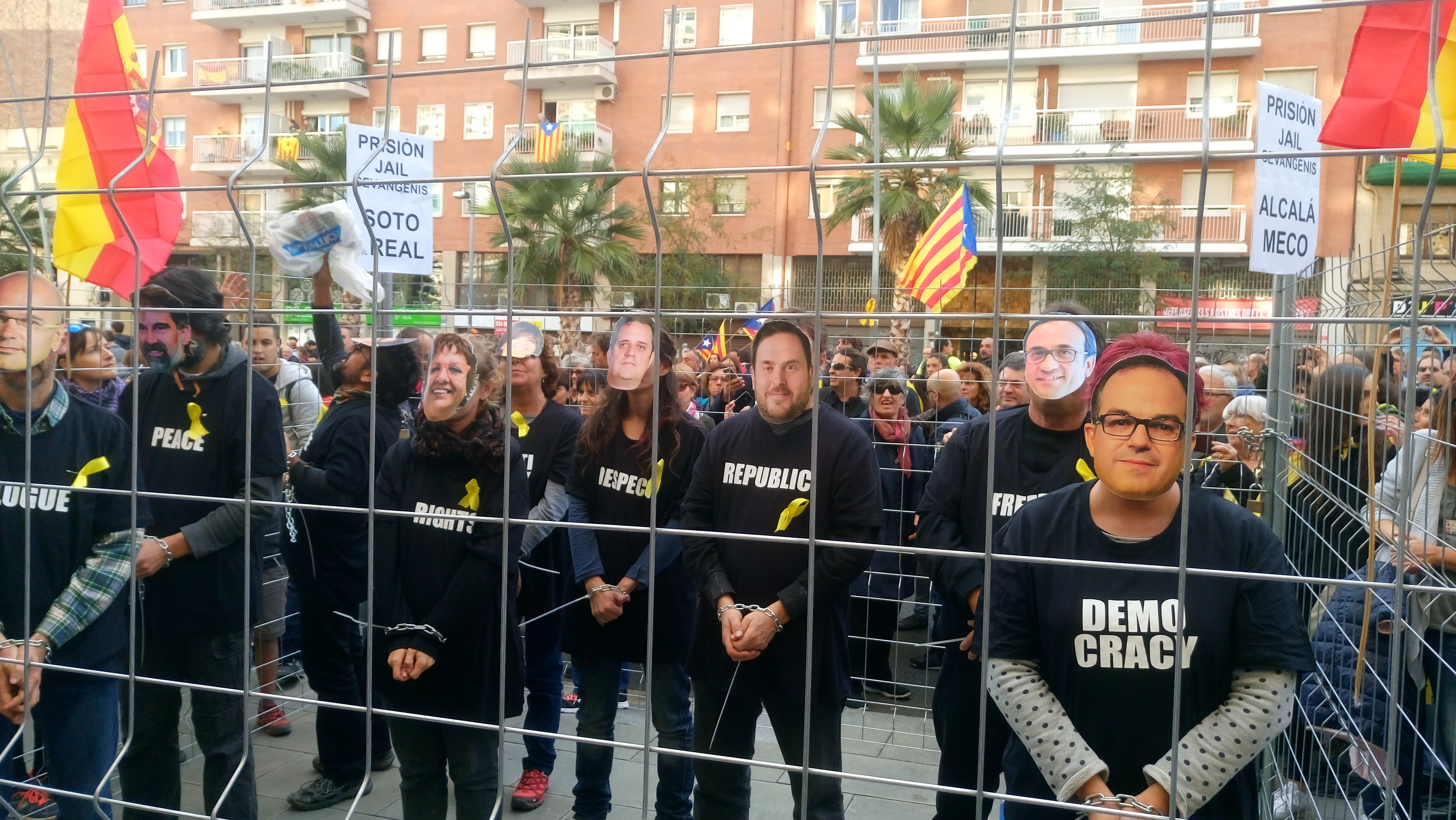
Demonstration under the slogan "Freedom for Political Prisoners, We are a Republic" on 11 November 2017

Subsequently, on 28 October, Mariano Rajoy dismissed the Executive Council of Catalonia, dissolved the Parliament of Catalonia and called a snap regional election for 21 December 2017 and handed coordination over Generalitat of Catalonia functions to Deputy Prime Minister Soraya Sáenz de Santamaría. On 30 October, as Spanish Attorney General José Manuel Maza called for charges of rebellion, sedition and embezzlement against Puigdemont and other Catalan leaders, it transpired that the ousted President and five of his ministers had fled to Belgium. Puigdemont, however, declared that he was not in Belgium "to seek asylum" and that he would respect the 21 December election, but also noting that he would not return home until "a fair judicial process was guaranteed" in Spain. Concurrently, lack of civil unrest and work resuming as normal throughout Catalonia showed direct rule from Madrid taking hold, with Spanish authorities reasserting administrative control over Catalan territory with little resistance. On 31 October, the independence declaration was suspended by the Constitutional Court of Spain.

Spain's National Court (Spanish: Audiencia Nacional) summoned Puigdemont and 13 other members of his dismissed government to appear on 2 November to respond to the criminal charges pressed against them. It was later ordered by the judge that eight members of the deposed Catalan government—including Puigdemont's deputy and ERC leader, Oriol Junqueras—be remanded in custody without bail after testifying for posing a flight risk, with a ninth—Santi Vila—being granted a €50,000 bail. Spanish prosecutors sought a European Arrest Warrant for Puigdemont and four other members who had remained in Belgium and refused to attend the hearing. The EAW demanding Puigdemont and his allies' arrest was officially issued to Belgium the next day, on 3 November, which Belgium said they would "study" before making any decisions. The detention of the former Generalitat members led to increased protests in Catalonia, with thousands calling for "freedom" for whom they viewed as "political prisoners". Puigdemont declared from an undisclosed location in Belgium that he regarded the detentions as "an act that breaks with the basic principles of democracy". In contrast, a separate case against other Catalan lawmakers was adjourned by the Supreme Court (Spanish: Tribunal Supremo) after all six of them, including Catalan parliament speaker Carme Forcadell, showed up to the summons. Puigdemont and the four other cabinet members turned themselves in to Belgian authorities on 5 November, awaiting a decision by the federal prosecutor on whether to hand them over to Spain or decline the warrant. They were released by the judge on the same day on conditions, such as they would not be able to leave the country without prior consent and would have to provide details to the police about their accommodation. On 5 December, six jailed members of the deposed government were freed on bail, while four others, including Oriol Junqueras, were required to remain imprisoned. The next day, Spain withdrew the EAW against Puigdemont just over a month after issuing it to Belgian authorities. On 18 November, while in office, Attorney General José Manuel Maza suddenly died and was succeeded ad interim by Luis Navajas until the appointment on 11 December of Julián Sánchez Melgar.

=== Regional election and investiture ===
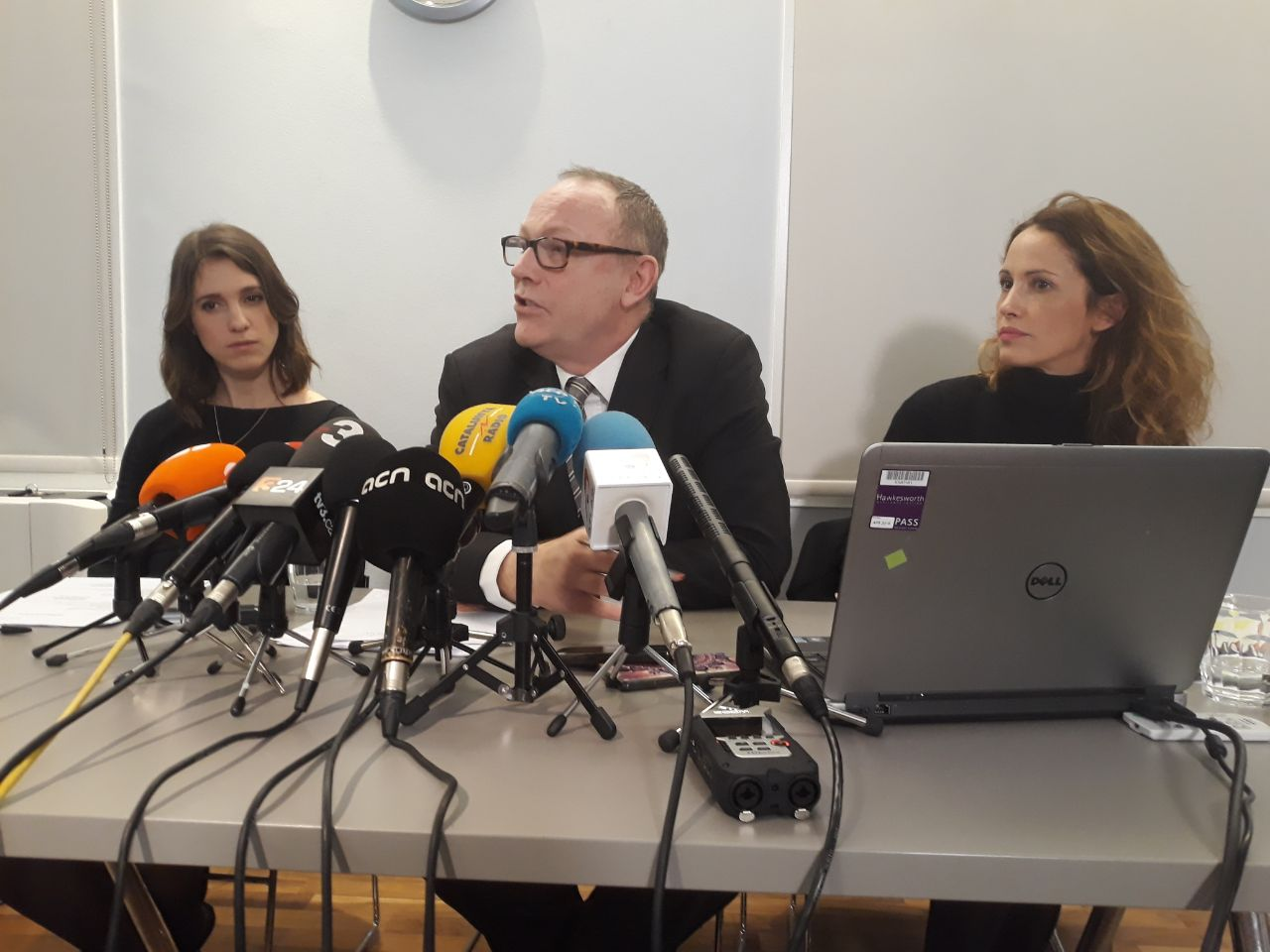
Lawyers Jessica Jones, Ben Emmerson and Rachel Lindon take case of Catalonia's jailed politicians to the United Nations, February 2018

The 21 December regional election called by Rajoy resulted in pro-independence parties retaining a reduced majority with 70 seats overall, with Puigdemont's coalition, Together for Catalonia, performing above expectations. With 36 seats, the main anti-independence party, Citizens, emerged as the largest in the Parliament, whereas Rajoy's People's Party was severely mauled after being reduced to 4.2% of the share and 4 out of 135 seats.

Inés Arrimadas, Citizens' leader in the region, announced she would not try to form a government on her own, instead waiting and see how negotiations between pro-independence parties evolved, due to them commanding a majority against her hypothetical candidacy. As the candidate of the most-voted party within the pro-independence bloc, Puigdemont intended to be re-elected as president, but this was hampered by the fact he risked being arrested by Spanish authorities upon returning from Brussels. Further, pro-independence parties could only command 62 seats—six short of a majority—as in practice eight of their elected deputies were either in Brussels with Puigdemont or in preventive detention.

After the Catalan parliament elected Roger Torrent as new speaker, Puigdemont was proposed as candidate for re-election as President of the Generalitat. However, facing arrest on possible charges of rebellion, sedition and misuse of public funds, the Catalan parliament delayed Puigdemont's investiture after Constitutional Court ruled that he could not assume the presidency from abroad. With other pro-independence leaders assuring the pro-independence movement should outlive Puigdemont in order to end the political deadlock, the former Catalan president announced on 1 March he would step his claim aside in order to allow detained activist Jordi Sànchez, from his Together for Catalonia alliance, to become president instead. However, as Spain's Supreme Court did not allow Sànchez to be freed from jail to attend his investiture ceremony, Sànchez ended up giving up his candidacy on 21 March in favour of former Catalan government spokesman Jordi Turull, who was also under investigation for his role in the referendum.

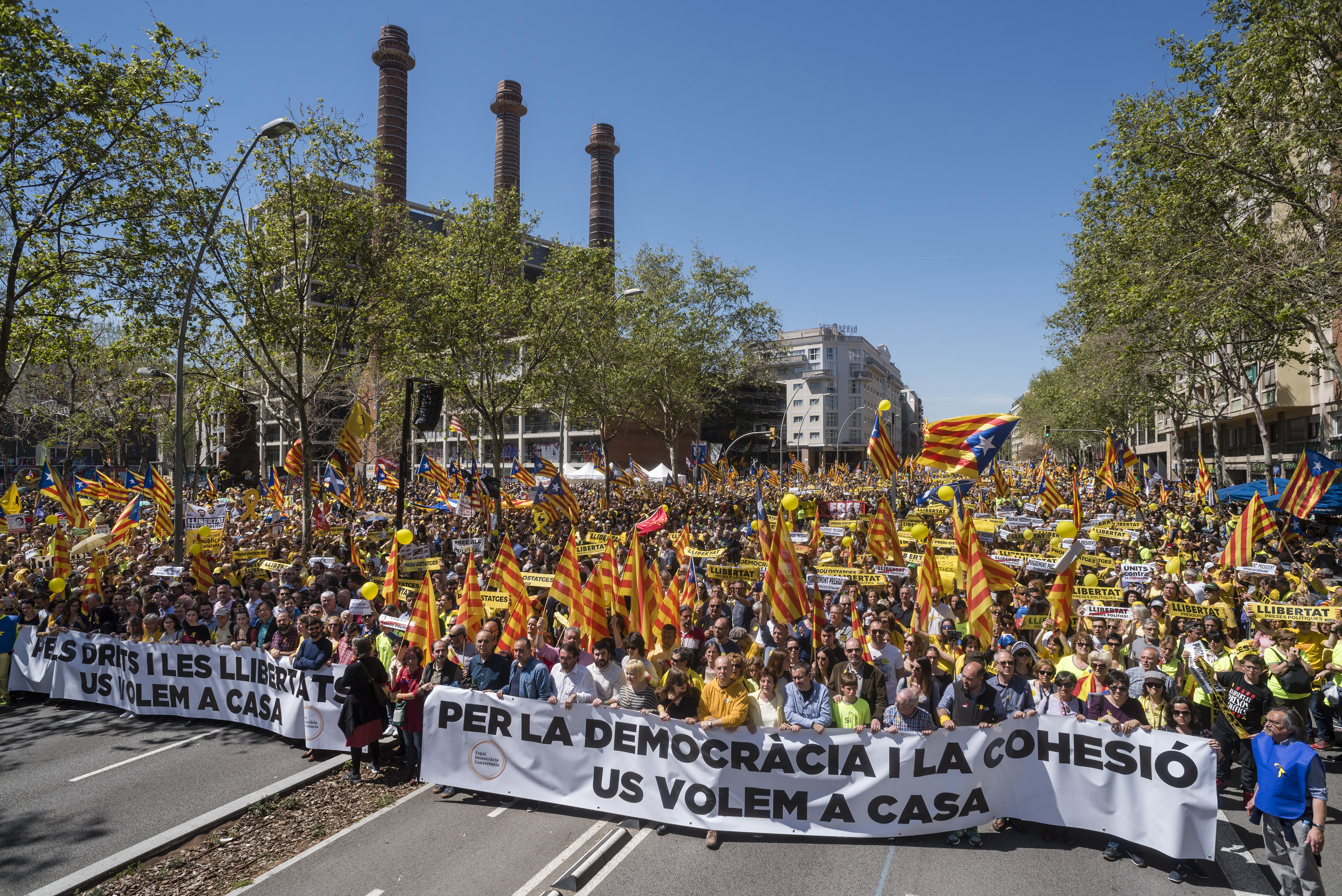
Protest march in Barcelona in support of Carles Puigdemont on 15 April 2018

Turull was defeated in the first ballot of a hastily convened investiture session held on 22 March, with only his Together for Catalonia alliance and ERC voting for him and the Popular Unity Candidacy abstaining, resulting in a 64–65 defeat. The next day and less than 24 hours before he was due to attend the second ballot, the Supreme Court announced that thirteen senior Catalan leaders—including Turull—would be charged with rebellion over their roles in the 2017 unilateral referendum and subsequent declaration of independence. Llarena sent five of them, including Turull and Carme Forcadell, previous Catalan Parliament speaker, to preventive jail; being the others already in preventive jail or exile. In anticipation of this ruling and in order to avoid appearing in court, Marta Rovira—ERC's general secretary and deputy leader to jailed Oriol Junqueras—fled the country to Switzerland in self-exile. As a result, the Parliament speaker Roger Torrent cancelled Turull's second investiture ballot. Thousands took the streets of dozens of Catalan cities to show discomfort with the decision of the court.

The European Arrest Warrant against Puigdemont was reactivated just as he was in a visit to Finland, but he had already left the country for Belgium before Finnish authorities received it. On his way to Belgium on 25 March he was caught and detained in Germany while crossing the border from Denmark. On 4 April he was released on bail after the state court in Schleswig rejected extraditing him for rebellion, though he may still be extradited on corruption charges. Ultimately, though, Spain dropped its European arrest warrant, ending the extradition attempt. Puigdemont was once again free to travel, and chose to return to Belgium.

== Alleged international interference ==
Many messages and operations that were seen via social networks come from Russian territory. And I use the correct expression: from Russian territory. That's not to say necessarily that we have determined that it is the Russian government. As such, we must act with extreme caution. We have to be clear on the origins. They are partly from Russian territory, partly from elsewhere, also outside the EU. We are determining this at the current time.

— Spanish Defence Minister María Dolores de Cospedal.

Russian President Vladimir Putin condemned Catalonia's independence referendum as "illegal". However, an analysis by the George Washington University School of Media and Public Affairs of over five million social media messages found that some Russian media and accounts on social networks related to Venezuela allegedly collaborated on disseminating negative propaganda against the Spanish government days before and after the referendum. Russia's RT and Sputnik would use Venezuelan social bots that would typically promote the Bolivarian government in Venezuela to criticize the Spanish government and police violence against citizens in Catalonia. Social bots, anonymous accounts and official state media accounts shared 97% of the anti-Spain messages while only 3% of the messages were shared by real social media members. Leaders of the George Washington University study displayed concern about the findings, stating that "democratic systems have the obligation to investigate these signs and implement systematic methods of monitoring and responding to alleged disruptions of foreign agents" and that it appeared the authors of the propaganda are the same as the ones who allegedly interfered in the 2016 United States presidential election and Brexit.

The Spanish ministries of Ministry of Defence and the Foreign Affairs later said they had confirmed that Russian actors and Venezuela had attempted to destabilize the nation and Europe by means of propaganda, though it would not confirm if the Russian government was directly involved and warned that similar misinformation actions may take place in future elections. NATO officials also made comments stating that Russia has been attempting to undermine Western governments through disinformation campaigns.

Members of Catalonia's separatist groups have denied allegations of foreign interference. Russian Foreign Minister Sergey Lavrov said in response: "Probably they are arranging this kind of scandalous, sensational hysteria in order to distract the attention of their electorate from their inability to resolve their problems at home." Kremlin Spokesman Dmitry Peskov said on 15 November: "The Spanish authorities, NATO, and the newspapers did not bring up a single worthwhile argument to back these claims. We consider these claims to be groundless, and more likely a deliberate or inadvertent continuation of the same hysteria that is now happening in the United States and a number of other countries."

According to the investigation by the Organized Crime and Corruption Reporting Project (OCCRP), in Barcelona on the evening of 26 October 2017, the day before the unilateral declaration of independence by the Parliament of Catalonia, Catalan president Carles Puigdemont met with the envoys of Russian president Vladimir Putin. Led by businessman Nikolay Sadovnikov, the Russian emissaries offered to give the Catalan government 10,000 armed Russian soldiers for the fight for independence against the Spanish state as well as an improbable sum of $500 billion in aid to pay all the Catalan debt. In return for their support, the Russian delegation requested that the Catalan government passes the necessary legislation to turn Catalonia into a new Switzerland of cryptocurrency. Although the meeting ended without a deal, the relationship between the Russians and the Catalan government has continued even after the failure of the push for independence with Puigdemont's associate, Víctor Terradellas, as the main interlocutor.

According to The New York Times citing a 'European intelligence report', in early 2019, Jose Lluis Alay, a senior advisor to Carles Puigdemont visited Moscow.
