= Dolores Delgado =

Spanish prosecutor (born 1962)

The Most Excellent Dolores Delgado
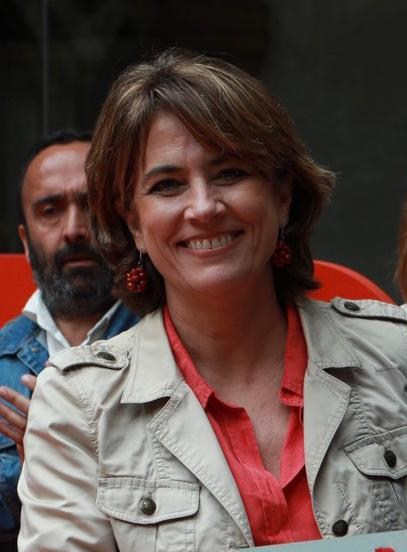

Prosecutor General of the State
- In office 26 February 2020 – 20 July 2022
- Preceded by: María José Segarra; Luis Navajas (acting)
- Succeeded by: Álvaro García Ortiz

Minister of Justice First Notary of the Kingdom
- In office 7 June 2018 – 13 January 2020
- Monarch: Felipe VI
- Prime Minister: Pedro Sánchez
- Preceded by: Rafael Catalá
- Succeeded by: Juan Carlos Campo

Member of the Congress of Deputies
- In office 21 May 2019 – 15 January 2020
- Constituency: Madrid

Personal details
- Born: Dolores Damián Delgado García; 9 November 1962 (age 63) Madrid, Spain
- Party: Independent
- Education: Autonomous University of Madrid
- Occupation: Prosecutor

Dolores Delgado García (born 9 November 1962) is a Spanish prosecutor who served as Prosecutor General of the State from 2020 to 2022. Previously, she served as Minister of Justice and First Notary of the Kingdom from 2018 to 2020, in the first Pedro Sánchez administration.

Delgado joined the Public Prosecution Service in 1989, being assigned to the High Court of Justice of the Autonomous Community of Catalonia. In 1993 she was promoted to prosecutor at the Audiencia Nacional, where she stands out for being responsible for important cases against drug trafficking and terrorism. Briefly, from 2006 to 2007 she was the Spokesperson of the Prosecution Ministry. She has also worked at the International Criminal Court and is an advocate of universal justice.

== Early life and education ==
Born in 1962 in Madrid, Delgado studied law at the Autonomous University of Madrid, furthering her legal education with a master's degree in EU Law by the Complutense University of Madrid.

== Career ==
In 1989, Delgado entered the Spanish Prosecutor Service, she was first assigned as a prosecutor at the High Court of Justice of Catalonia. Later she was assigned to the Special Anti-Drug Prosecutor's office.

From 1993, Delgado was a prosecutor at the Audiencia Nacional. In that capacity, she led the prosecution on several high-profile drug and terrorist cases, as promoted several Universal jurisdiction cases tried at the court. After the 2004 Madrid train bombings she specialised in Islamic terrorism.

For a short period of time (2006–2007), Delgado was the spokeswoman of the Prosecutor General's office. In 2011 she was a support prosecutor at the International Criminal Court.

As a prosecutor, she presented herself as a proponent of universal jurisdiction and emphasized combating corruption.

In 2013, she opposed the extradition of Hervé Falciani to Switzerland considering him a valuable asset in fight against tax fraud and corruption.

=== Minister of Justice, 2018–2020 ===
After Mariano Rajoy received a vote of no confidence, Prime Minister Pedro Sánchez appointed Delgado as Minister of Justice in June 2018. As Minister of Justice she also holds the honorary position of First Notary of the Kingdom. Thus, on 7 June she took office as Minister before the King at Palace of Zarzuela.

During her time in office she had a difficult relationship with the opposition. Proof of this is that Parliament requested her resignation three times.

In September 2018, the Senate requested her resignation for 149 votes in favour, 82 against and 7 abstentions. The reason, according to the opposition, was that the minister did not sufficiently defend the Supreme Court Justice, Pablo Llarena, before the Belgian courts.

On 9 October 2018, the Congress of Deputies requested her resignation for 166 votes in favour, 91 against and 83 abstentions. The motion, at People's Party initiative, considered that Delgado should not continue in the office because of her "perverse friendships" with the retired police commissioner José Manuel Villarejo and the former National Court justice Baltasar Garzón.

A month later, on 22 November 2018, the Congress of Deputies requested her resignation again for urging the State Lawyers Corps to rule out the crime of rebellion to jailed Catalan separatist leaders.

On 24 October 2019, she was one of the representatives of the caretaker government in the exhumation of Francisco Franco, serving as First Notary of the Kingdom, attesting to the incidentless extraction of the coffin with the remains of the dictator.

She left the office of Minister of Justice on 13 January 2020, being replaced by the socialist Juan Carlos Campo.

=== Prosecutor General, 2020–2022 ===
After the Sánchez II Government was sworn in, the Council of Minister nominated her on 13 January 2020 as the next Prosecutor General of the State, succeeding María José Segarra. On 15 January 2020 she left her position as Member of the Congress of Deputies. Despite criticism from the opposition parties and some conservative prosecution associations to her nomination, the Plenary of General Council of the Judiciary (CGPJ) on 16 January 2020 approved her candidature by 12-7 votes.

On 20 February 2020, she testified before the Justice Committee of the Congress of Deputies. Among her statements, she denied that having been a minister was a cause for not being appointed prosecutor general:

My time in the Ministry has been a factor that has enriched my profile, giving me an overview of the justice system, a deep knowledge of its actors, an international vision and great experience in the formation and management of work teams (...). The fact of having served as Minister of Justice should be understood not as a weakness, but as a strength.

— Dolores Delgado, at the Justice Committee on 20 February 2020.

She was officially appointed by the Monarch on 26 February 2020.

During COVID-19 pandemic in Spain, on 18 October 2020 she tested positive for COVID-19, but with mild symptoms.

In July 2022, she stepped down as Prosecutor General due to health issues.
