= Altsasu incident (2016) =

Spanish legal case

The Altsasu incident is a judicial case against eight young people from Altsasu, a small town in Navarre, Spain, for their involvement in a fight taking place on 15 October 2016 at a bar in which two off-duty Civil Guard officers stationed in the town and their girlfriends sustained injuries. One of the officers was knocked down, with the other victims reported to have suffered "psychological trauma". The lawsuit was initially conducted by the judge of the Spanish special court Audiencia Nacional Carmen Lamela. As of March 2018, Concepción Espejel was appointed as magistrate ahead of the trial held in late April.

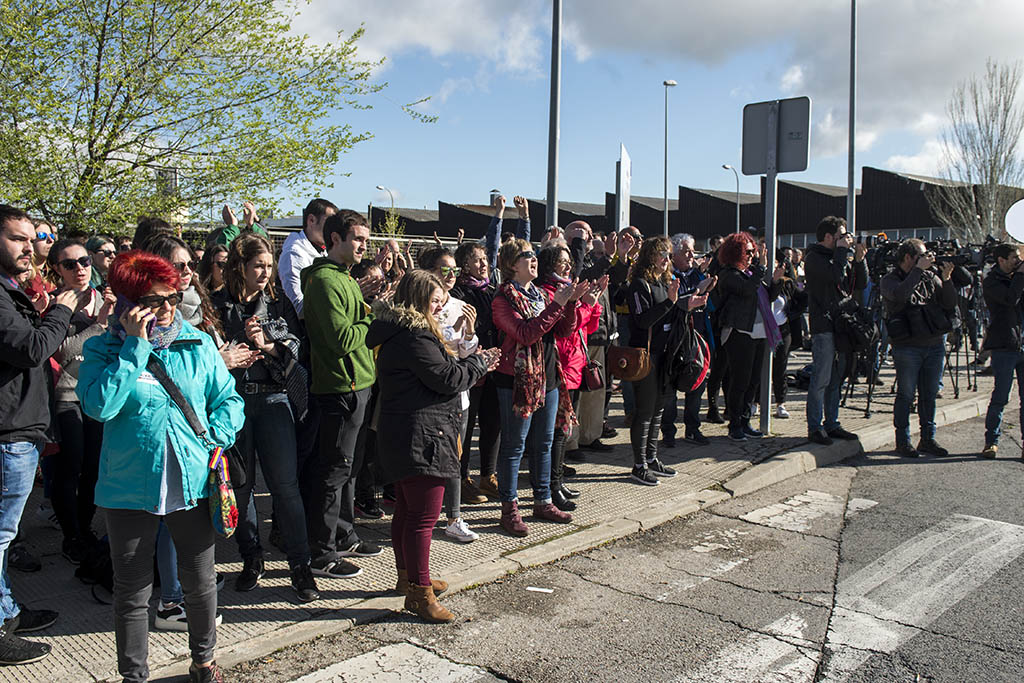
Support from Navarre to the accused opposite the Audiencia Nacional (Madrid)

The case was controversial because the public prosecutor described it was a "terrorist attack" and called for sentences ranging between 12 and 62 years, and for the heavy-handed approach of Spanish Justice in the case, amid allegations of irregularities and lack of neutrality in the proceedings. The National Court dismissed the terrorism charges, but convicted them with sentences ranging from 2 to 13 years. The state prosecutor appealed the sentence in June 2018, insisting on the existence of 'terrorism', but it was again dismissed in March 2019.

The final decision to the appeal filed by the detainees' parents on the Supreme Court was issued on 9 October 2019. The convictions were further reduced to sentences ranging from one year and a half to nine years and a half prison terms; two judges out of five issued a dissenting opinion, stating that discrimination charges should have been upheld. The relatives of the youngsters condemned and their defense lawyer Amaia Izko, despite saluting the reduction of sentences, considered they did not tie in with the actual circumstances, highlighting the "lack of guarantees during the process" and the "artificial account of the events".

All along the process, the parents of the defendants led a campaign for solidarity with the defendants and to denounce the circumstances surrounding the detention and the proceedings, with meetings and large demonstrations taking place across Navarre and the Basque Country overall. The Spanish Socialists, Spanish right-wing political parties and media, as well as Covite, an ETA victims' association, harshly criticized the aggressors, signs of support and the people of Altsasu, besides praising the Civil Guard.

== Evolution of events ==
=== Judicial statements and evidence ===
According to the judge, the two Spanish policemen were dressed in civilian clothes. At the local Altsasu festival, a number of youngsters approached them in the bar, asking them to leave. The policemen asked to be left alone but "later on, twenty-five other people approached them, with fifteen or twenty of them insulting and beating them until the patrols arrived". Iñaki Abad, one of the convicted youths, recorded a video on his mobile phone showing the Civil Guard officer who, according to the prosecution, had been "brutally battered on the ground", walking in a clean, white shirt moments after the events; he then walks over to Abad and smacks his phone away, but eventually shakes hands and talks with one of the defendants.

The footage, which calls into question the prosecution's case, was initially rejected as evidence by the special tribunal, but was later accepted after it was made public. Besides this evidence, the tribunal dismissed another piece of evidence submitted by the defense, namely witnesses and other footage of the incident of the events and afterwards, as well as pictures depicting the actual dimensions of the bar where the attack took place, as denounced by the defense.

=== Media attention and build-up ===
The incident immediately attracted a great deal of attention from the main Spanish media, echoing straight-away the Civil Guard's report, with their headlines highlighting that 50 people had attacked two Civil Guard officers. A convoy of over 20 Civil Guard SUVs rushed into the town, as shown on the media. The alleged aggressors handed themselves in to the regional police and the jurisdictional tribunal in Pamplona. They were subsequently released, having been charged. The interior minister Jorge Fernández Díaz stepped in, labelling it "a hate crime", but an isolated incident, "not kale borroka", also stating that the aggression "proves the town is gripped by a social pathology". Residents for their part protested the media were "turning the town into a circus act", bitterly criticizing the 'manipulation' of the events.

Four days later, the ETA victims' association Covite filed a report in the National Court against the defendants for alleged hate and terrorism offenses, as well as reporting Twitter accounts, the local movement Ospa and the campaign Alde hemendik! (Basque for "get out of here"). (Note: The movement Ospa and the campaign Alde hemendik! advocates for the retreat of the Civil Guard from Altsasu.) The National Court soon demanded the transfer of the case from its jurisdictional tribunal to the special court in Madrid, a request accepted by the Supreme Court of Spain, despite the regional tribunal's dismissal of terrorism charges.

=== Initial charges ===
The eight youths accused (Ohian Arnanz Ziordia, Jokin Unamuno Goikoetxea, Jon Ander Cob Amilibia, Julen Goikoetxea Larraza, Adur Ramirez de Alda Pozueta, Aratz Urrizola Ortigosa, Iñaki Abad Olea and Ainara Urkijo Goikoetxea) were charged with a string of offenses including ‘terrorism’; three of them were remanded and held under special regulations, with the others being released on bail.

One of the group faced a sentence of 62 years in prison, the rest 50 years, except for one defendant liable for 12. The youths were imprisoned under the article 573 of the Penal Code passed in 2015 by Mariano Rajoy's People's Party, which had been designed to crack down on Jihadism, the defense claimed.

=== Evolution of proceedings ===
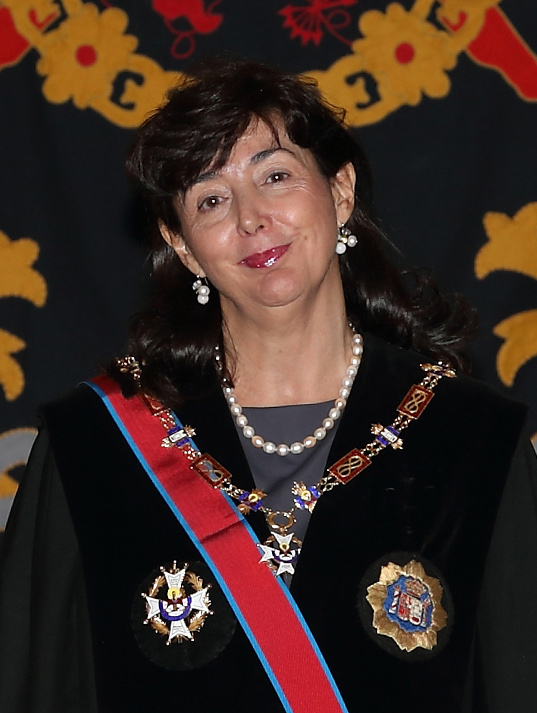
Magistrate Concepción Espejel, appointed to the case

In February 2018, the defense recused the new judge appointed to the case, Concepción Espejel, for her marriage to a Civil Guard colonel and for holding the Order of Merit of the Civil Guard awarded by the Ministry of the Interior; the petition was declined for being 'untimely'. The hearings took place from 16 to 27 April. On 1 June 2018, the sentence was announced, with the National Court eventually dismissing the terrorism charges and finding the accused guilty of injuring and attacking an agent of the authority, aggravated with abuse of superiority, discrimination and public disorders and threats. One of the accused was sentenced to 2 years of prison, three with 9 years, two with 12 years and the remaining two with 13 years.

The families, besides labeling the sentence 'outrageous' and an act of 'revenge', announced their plans to appeal. Four days later, the Civil Guard in Altsasu arrested four defendants and sent them to prison on "flight risk" grounds. On 14 June 2018, the state prosecutor appealed the sentence, arguing again that "there was terrorism" involved. Six days later, Iñaki Abad's sentence was reduced by 3 years, "due to an error", and the verdict was modified, with the judge now accepting the initial evidence given by María José, N.C., a victim of the attack, who said that Abad was not among the aggressors.

On 7 March 2019, the sentence for the appeals made by the defense and the prosecution was leaked to the Spanish radio station Cadena Ser ahead of its official announcement by the National Court to the parts involved, confirming for the most part the initial verdict: no terrorism was involved but heavy sentences were still appropriate, due to aggravating circumstances, like "ideological discrimination" against the Civil Guard officers and their girlfriends. Iñaki Abad's sentence was reduced to a 6-year prison term. (Note: "Ideological discrimination" charges were brought forward for being directed at the paramilitary police body Civil Guard, a consideration coming up against much juridic criticism, and even dubbed 'untenable', cf. "La AN ratifica el agravante por 'discriminación ideológica' en el caso Alsasua". EITB (in Spanish). 2019-03-08.)

The final decision to the appeal filed by the detainees' relatives on the Supreme Court was issued on 9 October 2019, with the tribunal calling the aggression 'abominable' for having addressed it to Civil Guard officers, but ultimately dismissing "ideological discrimination" and "abuse of authority"; the sentence disregards the public prosecutor's statement in mid-September holding that "the Civil Guard was being targeted for their commitment to the King and the people of Spain". The convictions were further reduced to sentences ranging from one year and a half to nine years and a half; two judges out of five issued a dissenting opinion, stating that discrimination charges should have been upheld. The relatives of the youngsters condemned and their defense lawyer Amaia Izko, despite saluting the reduction of sentences, considered they did not tie in with the actual circumstances, highlighting the "lack of guarantees during the process" and the "artificial account of the events".

== Statements heard during proceedings ==
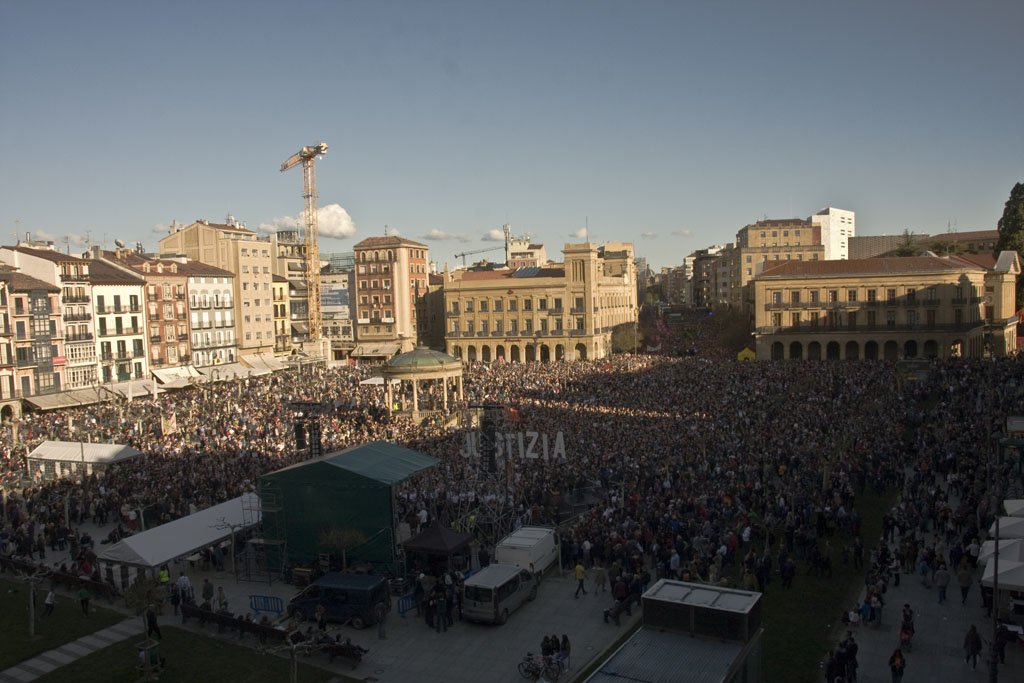
Demonstration at Pamplona in support of the defendants (April 2018)

The trial became the centre of media attention for the heavy sentences requested and the circumstances surrounding the trial, including certain statements:

What we are seeing in the 21st century Spain is people asking others whose job they do not like to get out of town. It is xenophobia, racism, full-blown fascism, since that is what the supremacist Basque nationalists stand for, imbued as they are with outmoded nationalism.

— José Perals, National Court's prosecutor

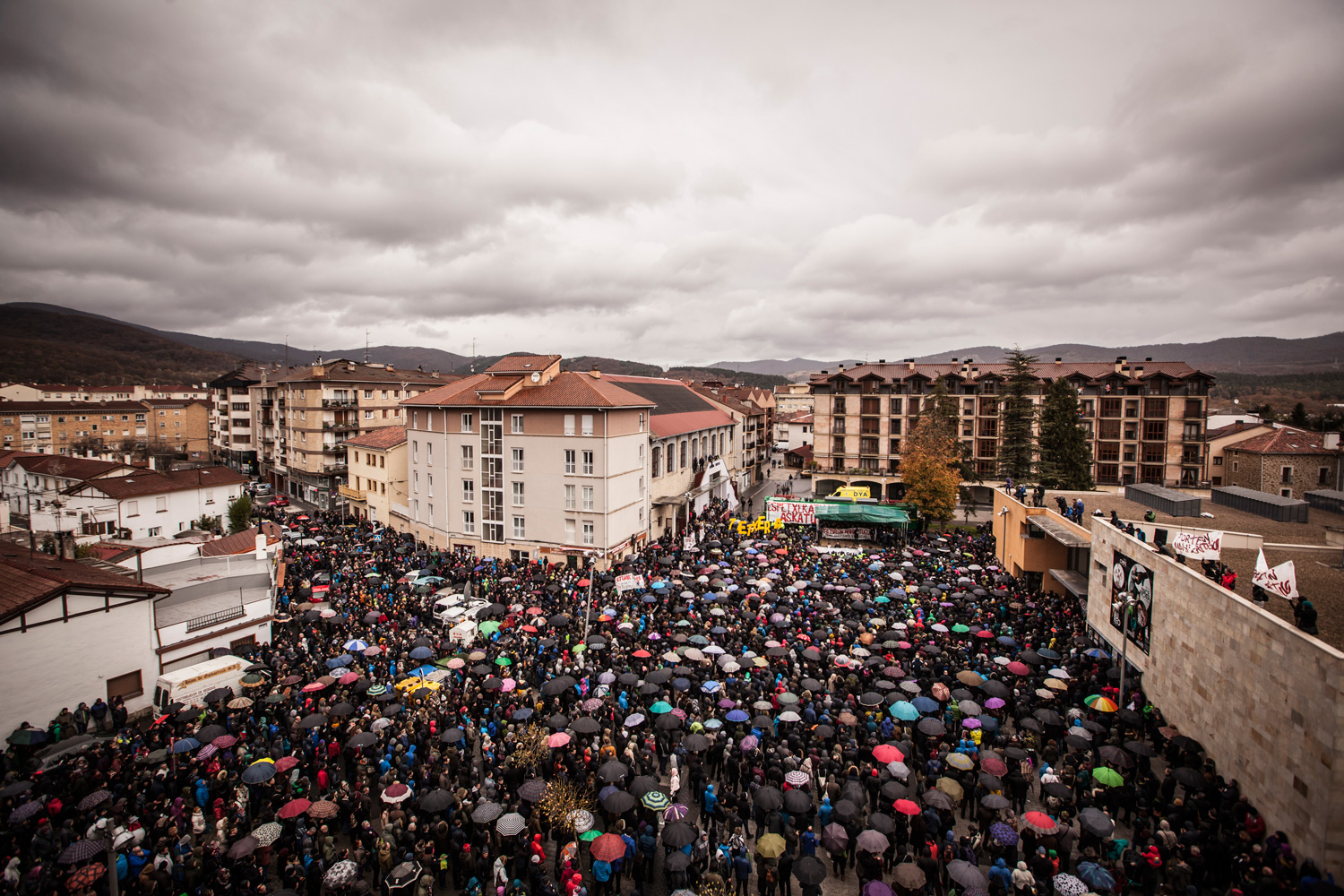
Early support in Altsasu to the defendants, denouncing their judicial treatment

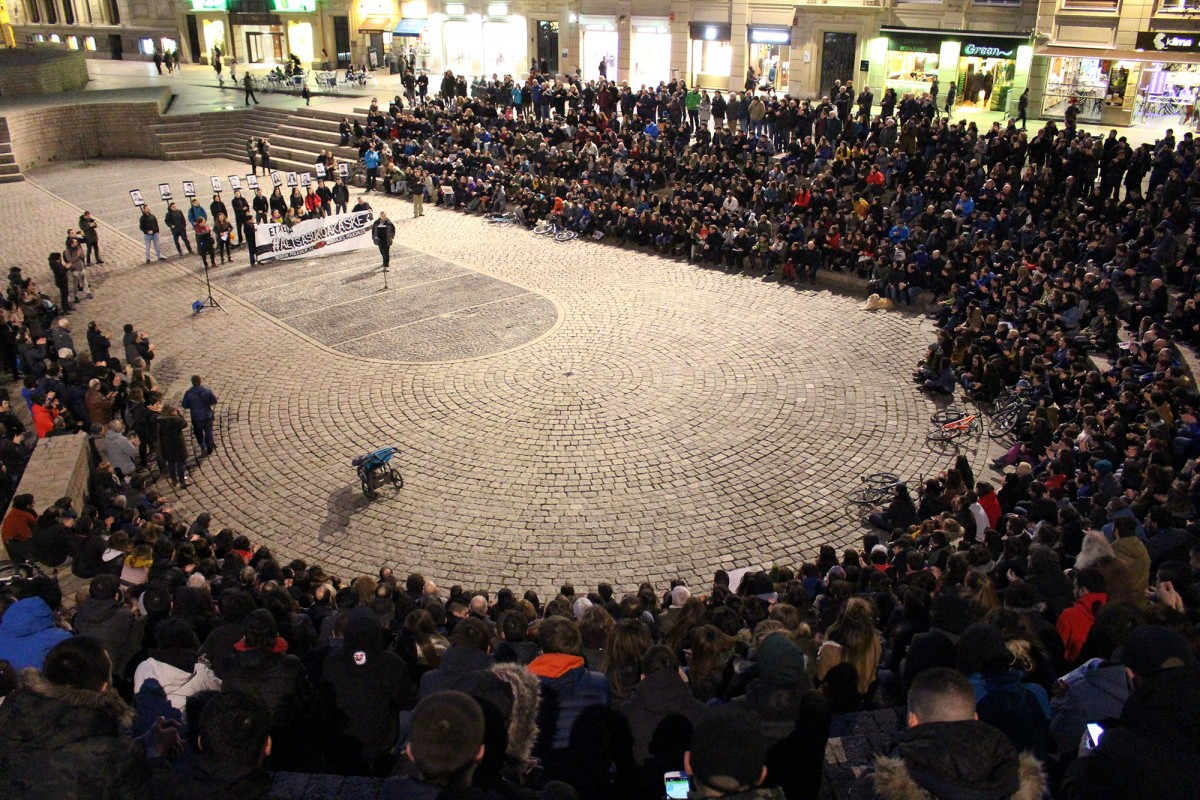
Event in solidarity with the defendants at Vitoria-Gasteiz

We consider that if no terrorism is considered in cases like this, we would be going back 20 years, when ETA's youth organizations Segi, Jarrai and Haika roamed unrestrained across the towns of the Basque Country and Navarre, and some said that it was nothing but the kale borroka, petrol boys.

— José Perals, National Court's prosecutor

[The sentence shows] absolute contempt for the principle of justice, it is completely disproportionate; it is about revenge, with the clear aim of generating pain.

— Parents of the defendants

== Reactions ==
=== Criticism of the attack ===
The heavy-handed approach of the public prosecutor and the judge to the defendants has led to a rise in the explicit support of the main ETA victims' associations, Ciudadanos and the Spanish Conservatives in office, as they see a link to an "ETA strategy" in the alleged assault based on Civil Guard reports. On 22 October 2016, the head of COVITE Consuelo Ordoñez visited Altsasu along with three other individuals and a notable media presence next to a local meeting protesting the Civil Guard's presence and the "staged police set-up" in relation to the assault; Ordoñez held placards reading slogans in support of the Civil Guard and against 'fear'. The following day, the Spanish premier Mariano Rajoy intervened, stating that "there will be no impunity" for the "brutal assault".

On 18 April 2018, approximately 2,500 people attended a meeting held in Pamplona called by several parties (PP, UPN, PSN and Ciudadanos) and two ETA victims associations to show their support to the Civil Guard officers and girlfriends subject of the aggression, also bitterly criticizing the Navarrese government for their stance on the issue. On 1 June, the main Civil Guard association AUGC hailed the sentences imposed on the defendants in the hope that this will "reduce hostility" towards the paramilitary police body and "improve cohabitation". It added that "it is not acceptable under the rule of law to have public security forces and their families, many of them underage, deprived of leading a peaceful life because of their uniform".

The Spanish Conservatives (PP) in Navarre held that the motion passed by the Parliament of Navarre, which criticised the alleged lack of proportion seen in the sentencing was "supporting the executioners and not the victims". Pablo Casado, elected head of the Spanish PP in July 2018, visited the Civil Guard headquarters in Altsasu during the run-up to the party presidency campaign, to show his support for the Civil Guard, declaring that "there can be no impartiality between thugs battering innocent people in a bar and public servants who risk their lives battling for our rights and liberties". (Note: He also labelled any governmental initiatives to bring Basque prisoners closer to their families as a 'concession', also stating that "the illness of hate, sectarianism, xenophobia we have suffered for long years in Spain, we need to start healing it", and lashing out at those who regarded his visit in Altsasu as opportunist, considering them a token of "a sick society". He went on to assert that the Basque flag "does not belong in Navarre, and Basque is not the language of Navarre", see Irazusta, A. ETB. 25-05-2018. "Polémica en Navarra con las palabras de Pablo Casado sobre el euskera")

=== Criticism of the process ===
Elsewhere, the case has caused outrage and perplexity among many political, social and institutional sectors in Altsasu, Navarre, and the Basque Country in general, with many calling into question the official account of events. In July 2017, 52 MEPs affiliated to five different parliamentary groups signed a public document requesting the intervention in the case of the president of the European Commission Jean-Claude Junker "for the sake of proportionality, equity and justice", emphasizing that the state prosecutor's prison term petition was "disproportionate, nonsensical and antidemocratic". The European Commission in turn announced it would closely watch the developments in the judicial process.

Amnesty International, while labelling the incident "a very serious offence", pointed to the risk of trivialization and ambiguity of the 'terrorism' charge, as well as "lack of proportion" in the indictments requested. It also voiced its concern that the judicial process may be "breaching impartiality" and "discriminating the defendants based on their ideology", also adding that the accusation of 'terrorism' should have never happened. Also in June 2018, the one-time magistrate of the National Court Baltasar Garzón called the whole process an 'embarrassment' spurred by an urge to satisfy the grudges or wishes for revenge held by certain sectors in Spain, using the judiciary for the purpose. Similarly, football coach Pep Guardiola criticized in June 2019 the 900-day imprisonment of the perpetrators and the Spanish state's alleged meddling in this and other cases, like those arrested in relation to the Catalan process.

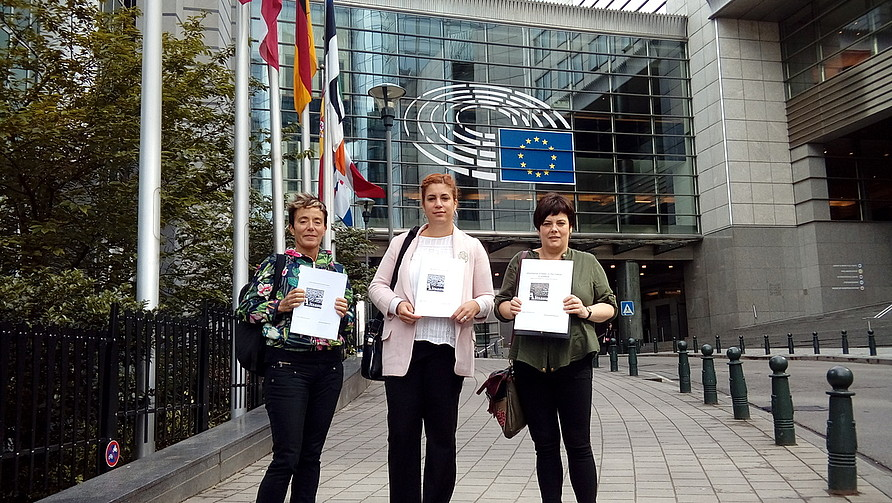
Parents of the defendants in the European Parliament

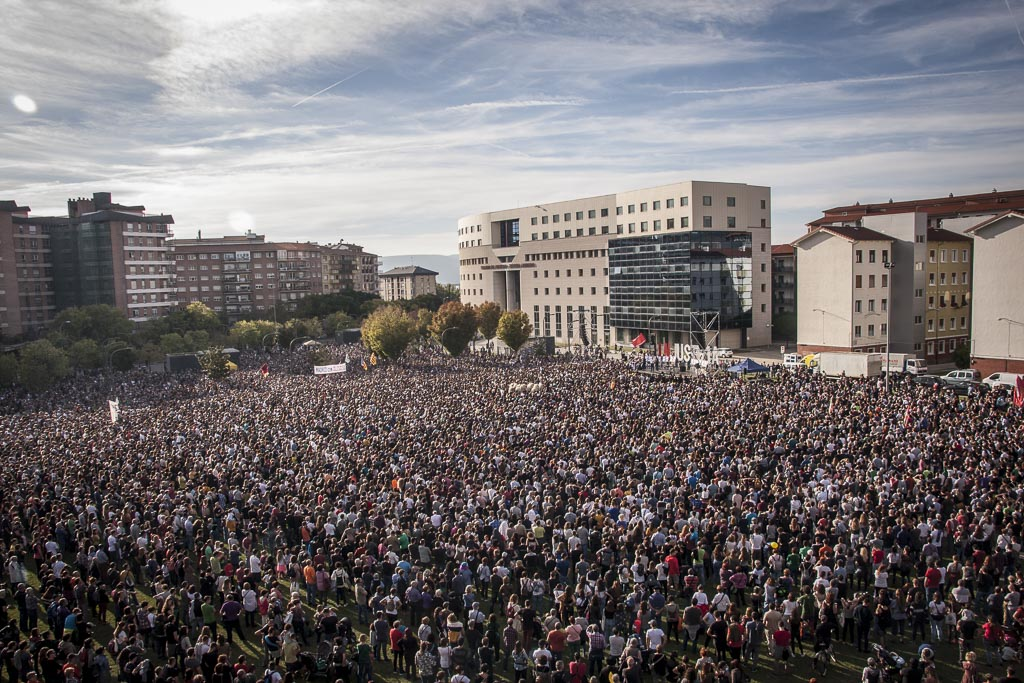
Rally in Pamplona to denounce the final sentence, "This is not justice" (October 2019)

Ahead of the trial hearings in April, a rally was held on 14 April in Pamplona to protest against the conditions in which proceedings were taking place and in support of the defendants and their families. Between 30,000 and 50,000 protesters turned out to the streets of Pamplona. The mayor of Pamplona Joseba Asiron, on behalf of the Local Council, and Maria Solana, the representative of the regional government, attended the protest, which was also supported by the unions LAB, ELA, CC.OO and the parties in office at Navarre. By contrast, the call was opposed by the parties UPN, PSN and PP of Navarre.

The unexpected arrests, amid strong security measures, of four defendants in Altsasu on 5 June, raised the level of indignation in Altsasu and Navarre against the judicial peculiarities and 'disproportion' surrounding the case. "A court summons would have done", the mother of a defendant remarked. The parents of those arrested claimed the whole process was fraught with irregularities, "a juridical aberration". They announced a demonstration in Pamplona on 16 June in which they expected a greater number of protesters than those who turned out to the demonstration on 14 April. The Government and Parliament of Navarre have also showed their support for the families in "their quest for justice".

On 16 June, between 30,000 and 80,000 people took to the streets in Pamplona under the banner "this is not justice" and showed solidarity with the young prisoners, who were being held 500 kilometres away from home. The rally, probably the largest held at Pamplona in recent times, received wide support from political personalities (PNV, EH Bildu, Podemos, etc.), a number of unions, and individuals coming from different parts of Spain. (Note: It counted on the support of 150 coaches arriving from several Catalan and Spanish locations, a strong support from the Catalan pro-independence movement, and figures such as Barricada singer Enrique Villarreal "El Drogas", singer Mikel Markez, or the physicist Pedro Miguel Etxenike.) On 24 March 2019, 35,000 to 60,000 protesters took to the streets of Altsasu bearing the same slogan; the protest was also attended by a number of high-ranking officials and representatives of Navarre and Altsasu; the organizers denounced the "lack of neutrality and rigour" during the proceedings. A significant number of demonstrators arrived from other parts of Spain and Catalonia, beyond the Basque region." Following the final sentence on early October 2019, the relatives of the convicts called a demonstration on 26 October in Pamplona to protest the "lack of proportionality" in the sentence under the banner "this is not justice"; it was attended by the mayor of Altsasu and several thousands of marchers, 7,500 according to local police forces, 52,000 according to the organizers. On 28 September 2020, Basque goalkeeper Unai Etxebarria was fired from the premier league Granada CF after showing his support to the youths condemned.

== Political fallout ==
The case has become a rallying cry for the Spanish right and far-right, with nationalistic overtones. On 4 November 2018, a group of people led by Albert Rivera from Ciudadanos and Fernando Savater, rode in a bus from Santander Altsasu to stage an event. They were followed by PP and Vox, delivering a hardline message against pro-independence advocates amidst a tense atmosphere and claiming their right to speak in the town. They were escorted by the National Police and Civil Guard deployed in full riot gear throughout, who established a security cordon.

The committee was met by different groups of locals protesting their presence. While addressing a speech to their followers, the town bells started to chime for the whole duration of the event, accompanied at times by a siren and a rock concert which had been staged nearby. On 30 May 2019, a €3000 fine was given to the youths who entered the church to ring the bells. Ospa movement members claimed that from January to April 2019, police stopped 168 cars in the town or its vicinity at roadblocks, 63 of which were conducted by the Civil Guard and the remaining 105 by the Navarrese Foral Police.

On the eve of the National Court's announcement of the sentence in March 2019, Popular Party leader Pablo Casado visited the bar in Altsasu where the assault took place in order to take part in a TV interview. However, it was cut short by the bar owner, who asked them to leave the place as they had not asked permission to shoot. The interviewer, a well-known, controversial Spanish journalist, stated that "25 pro-ETA thugs" ('proetarras') were lurking outside, with the Civil Guard's intervention eventually saving Casado, him and his crew, although available footage clearly disputes such claims.

== In popular culture ==
In December 2020, the miniseries Altsasu produced by Baleuko was aired on the public Basque language TV station ETB, based on the case and the 450-page transcription of the process, as stated by its director Asier Urbieta. The coalition PP-Ciudadanos and Covite, an association of ETA victims, bitterly criticized the series before its premiere and demanded that it be called off immediately.

The Altsasu play is based on the Altsasu (play) incident.

== See also ==
- La Manada sexual abuse case
- Operation Anubis
