= Operation Anubis =

2017 Spanish police operation in Catalonia

- Part of the 2017 Catalan independence referendum, the 2017 Spanish constitutional crisis and the 2012–present Catalan independence movement
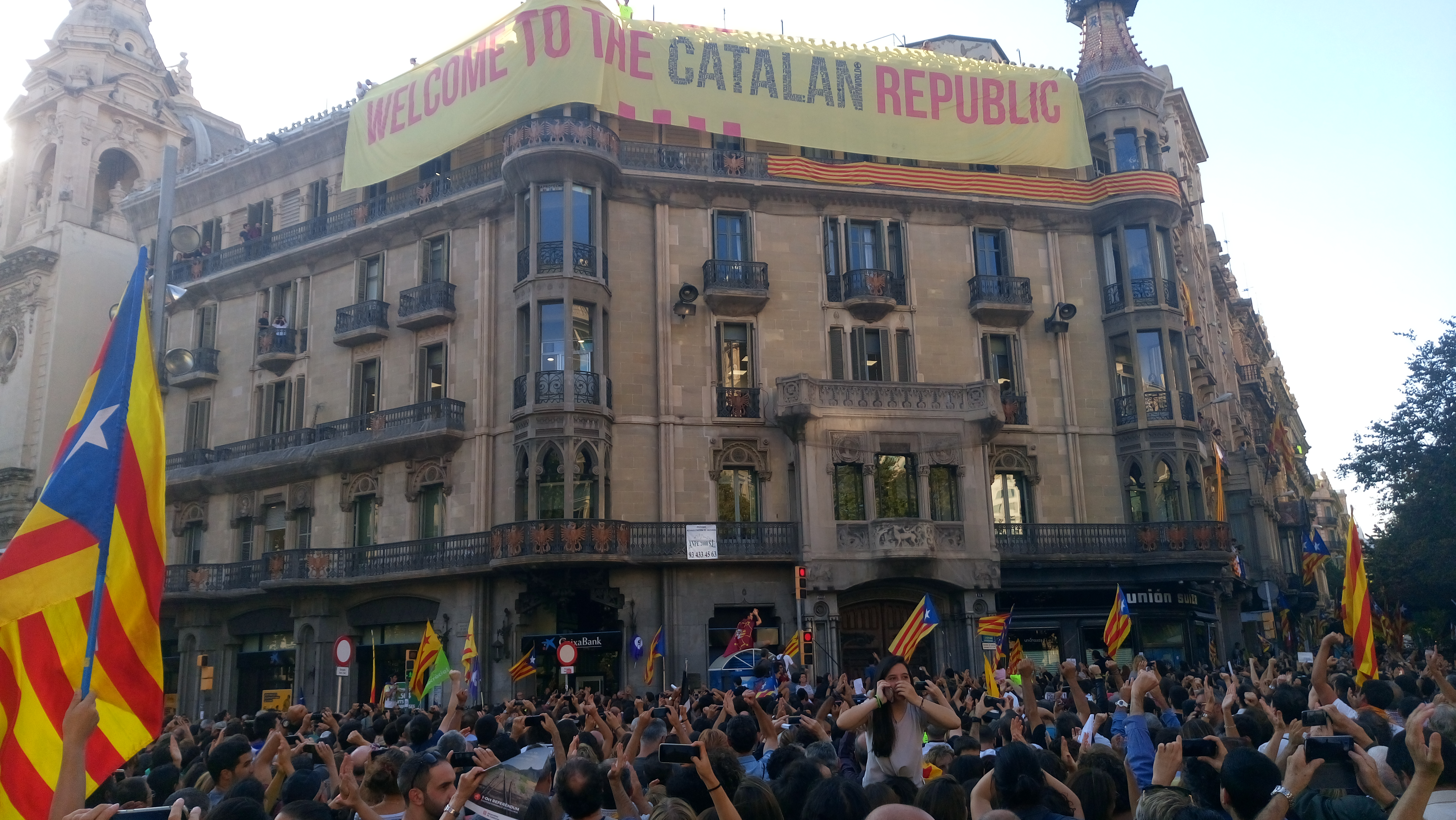
- A banner with the sentence Welcome to the Catalan republic was hung on the facade of the Catalan economic department.
- Date: 20 September 2017
- Location: Barcelona
- Goals: Prevent the 2017 Catalan independence referendum
- Methods: Police operation

Parties
Court of Instruction No. 13 of Barcelona; Civil Guard (acting as judicial police)	Generalitat of Catalonia; Pro-independence demonstrators Assemblea Nacional Catalana; Òmnium Cultural	Mossos d'Esquadra

Lead figures
Juan Antonio Ramírez Sunyer	Carles Puigdemont; Jordi Sànchez; Jordi Cuixart	Josep Lluís Trapero; Teresa Laplana

Number
+10 Civil Guard agents 1 judicial secretary	c. 40,000 demonstrators	

Casualties and losses
Damages: 3 Nissan Patrol damaged (€135,632)	Arrested: 14; Indictments: 16	Indictments: 2

The Operation Anubis was a police operation in Catalonia, Spain, initiated on 20 September 2017 by the Civil Guard following orders of the trial court number 13 of Barcelona, directed by judge Juan Antonio Ramírez Sunyer. Its aim was to dismantle the framework of the Catalan independence referendum of 1 October 2017, that was suspended on 6 September 2017 by the Constitutional Court of Spain as breaching the 1978 Constitution. Different headquarters of the Generalitat de Catalunya were searched and 14 people were arrested, including high ranking administrative staff, and company CEO's involved in the preparation of the referendum. Simultaneously, several printing and media companies were searched looking for ballot papers and boxes. More than 140 websites were shut down by Spanish authorities.

Crowds gathered around Catalan regional ministries to support those arrested and protest against the searches. About 40,000 demonstrators surrounded the Catalan economy department heeding a call made by pro-independence groups Òmnium Cultural and ANC. One vehicle of the Civil Guard was damaged. The autonomous police force of Catalonia, Mossos d'Esquadra, recognized that there was a risk situation.

Jordi Sànchez and Jordi Cuixart—leaders of ANC and Òmnium Cultural— and the Mossos d'Esquadra Major Josep Lluís Trapero Álvarez have been accused of sedition, a felony regulated by the article 544 and subsequents of the Spanish Criminal Code, for allegedly encouraging protesters to hinder the Spanish police raids to dismantle the framework of the referendum. On 16 October 2017, Sànchez and Cuixart were provisionally put into jail without bail pending the investigation. At the conclusion of the trial of Catalonia independence leaders on 14 October 2019, the Spanish Supreme Court condemned Sànchez and Cuixart to a nine-year sentence after considering them guilty of sedition. Amnesty International stated their detention and sentence constitutes a disproportionate restriction on his rights to free speech and peaceful assembly, and urged Spain to free them. The nine jailed leaders were pardoned and freed in June 2021.

== Background ==
The investigation started due a complaint presented by the far-right political party Vox and an anonymous complainant, in response to a claim from Catalan judge and politician Santiago Vidal assuring that preparations for the referendum were underway. The investigation was assigned to the trial court number 13 of Barcelona, which had a conservative judge, Ramírez Sunyer, close to the General Council of the Judiciary. According to the defense, the assignment was against the rules and was done arbitrarily to get a hard anti-independence judge to investigate the case.

On 9 September, Spanish Civil Guard raided the headquarters of the weekly newspaper El Vallenc for being allegedly linked to the preparation of the independence referendum, about 200 people gathered in front of the building to support the journalists being investigated. On the same day, the Civil Guard also raided the printing office Indugraf Offset in Constantí searching for ballots and material related to the Catalan referendum.

Over 45,000 notifications for the polling station members were confiscated on 19 September by the Civil Guard after raiding the offices of the posting service Unipost. Hundreds of protesters practiced nonviolent resistance sitting in front of the offices in order to block the access, delaying the action of the judicial committee for hours.

== 20 September ==
Following a judge's orders, on the morning of 20 September 2017 several units of the Spanish Civil Guard raided 41 locations, including: the headquarters of the Vice President of Catalonia, the regional ministries of economy, foreign affairs, social affairs and family, the tax agency of Catalonia, the consortium of open administration of Catalonia, the Catalan Institute of Finance, the dotCAT Foundation, private houses of Catalan government officials and one printing company. Spanish officers claimed to have seized 9.6 million ballot papers in the raids.

During these raids the Spanish Civil Guard arrested 14 people, most of them high-ranking members from the Generalitat of Catalonia, but also CEOs of private companies or just administrative staff.

After hours of watching it, officers of the National Police Corps circled the headquarters of the Popular Unity Candidacy party (CUP) at 1:00pm, in Casp street, Barcelona, but were prevented from searching inside by party members and supporters due to not having a court order. The party made several calls to the citizenship to "go to protect our headquarters" and organized a sit-in protest in order to block Spanish police access to their offices which gathered thousands of people. The police deployment lasted eight hours until they finally left without searching the building or arresting anyone. David Fernàndez, member of CUP, defined the intend to enter their headquarters without a court order as a "flagrant crime against fundamental, civil and political rights".

On the same day, the Spanish government announced that they were sending two ships to Barcelona and one to Tarragona to allocate Spanish police reinforcements deployed from other places of Spain. The first ship to arrive in Barcelona was the Rhapsody, from an Italian shipping company, followed by the MS Moby Dada, also Italian. The ship that docked in Tarragona was named GNV Azzurra. The three ships had a capacity of 6,600. Days later, these reinforcements tried to prevent the referendum on independence, injuring over 900 voters and panic scenes that were broadcast on news stations worldwide.

=== Protests ===
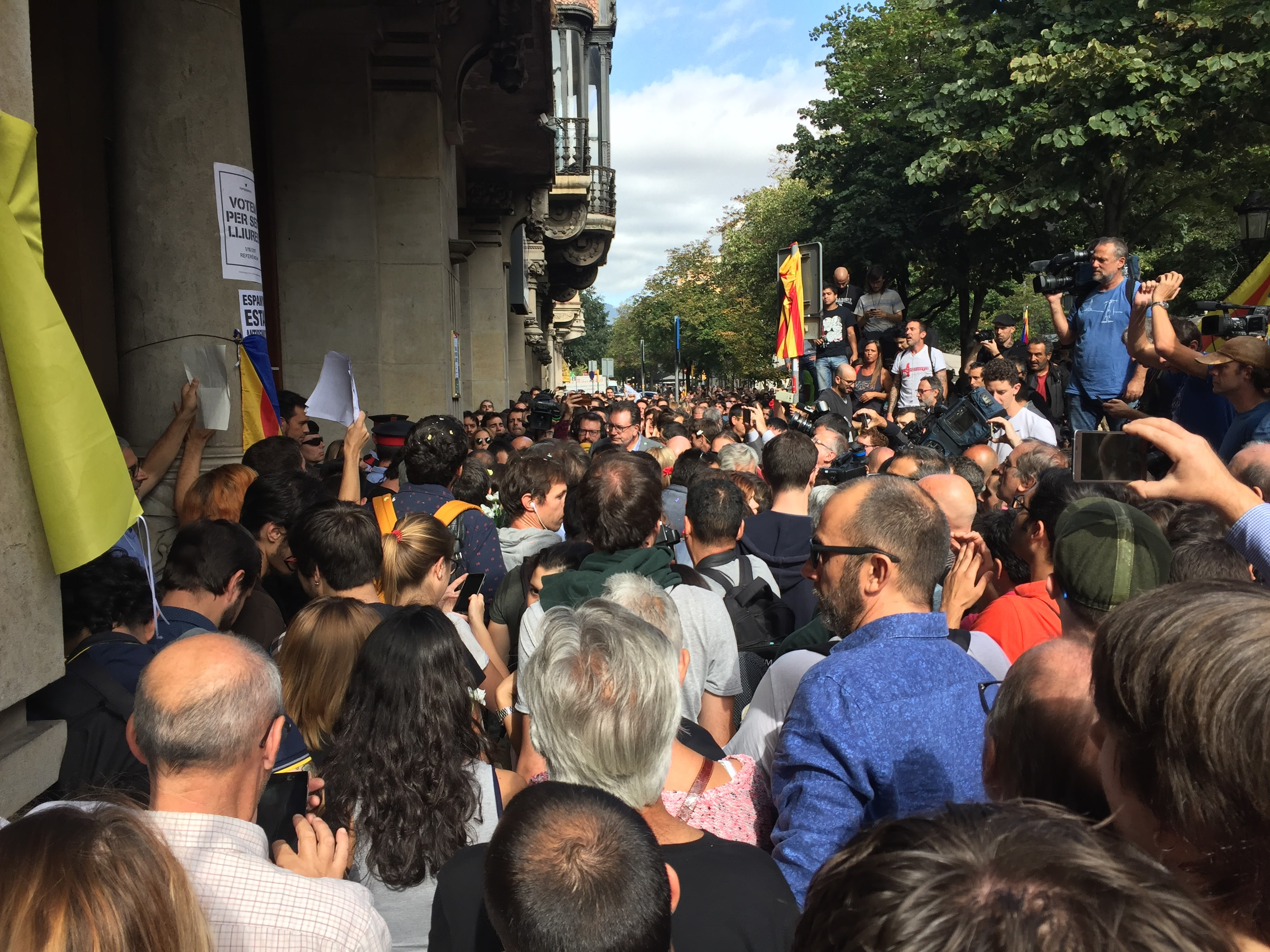
Crowd in front of the Department of Economy after the arrests.

As the searches began, crowds spontaneously gathered outside the buildings being raided by the Spanish Civil Guard; namely the headquarters of the Department of Economy, in Rambla Catalunya, and the Department of External Affairs, in Via Laietana.

Some minutes later, Òmnium Cultural and ANC called for a mobilization to avoid demonstrators being prosecuted given that Spanish Citizen's Security Law sets very high penalties for unauthorized demonstrations. Civil pro-independence organizations called for "peaceful resistance" in front of some of the buildings being searched. The Mayor of Barcelona Ada Colau also called all citizens to take the streets in protest for the raids. Soon after people started gathering in front of the Economy Department, crowds forced the closure of the Gran Via. According to several sources, at some moment there were more than 40,000 people in the demonstration in front of the Catalan economy department. In the afternoon, various volunteers offered food and water to demonstrators. Several concerts were held in the junction between Rambla de Catalunya and Gran Via, like Companyia Elèctrica Dharma and Judit Neddermann as well as castells.

Even though the police operations were not notified in advance to the autonomous police force of Catalonia, Mossos d'Esquadra, as soon as people started gathering around the Catalan economy department, Civil Guard requested the intervention of Mossos. The Civil Guard agents involved in the raid made 6 calls for help to Mossos during the day. The first request for help was at 9:14 am with the subject: "Urgent - Request for support to Mossos" with the goal to force people to move 40 meters away from the building. Mossos did not intervene alleging that might cause public disorders and that the demonstration was being peaceful and authorized. Instead, ANC volunteers created a human corridor so the access to the building would not get blocked. Workers of the Department of Economy hung Catalan and European Union flags in the balconies of the building as long as the raid lasted. Mossos alleged they were not notified in advance about the raids, so they couldn't prepare a police operation to keep demonstrators far from the building. At midday, the Civil Guard notified Mossos they would end the registries around 20.15, but later stated they would be delayed for hours due to computer problems. Mossos considered there was a situation of risk, but discarded using crowd-controls units until later in the night when most demonstrators already left.

According to the court clerk, she remained trapped until midnight inside the building and had to flee by the roof terrace, while several agents were trapped throughout the night as demonstrators shouted outside "You won't get out!" and "They shall not pass". The solution to leave through the roof terrace of the neighbouring building was proposed by Mossos after the court clerk rejected to use the human corridor created by the police. Civil Guard stayed inside the building until the demonstration was called off and Mossos cleared the zone, so they could get access to the three cars that were parked in front of the Catalan economy department. Those cars were damaged by journalists in the morning and later vandalized up by demonstrators. According to the Civil Guard, the damages in the vehicles (3 Nissan Patrol) accounted for €135,632 .

Civil Guard officers left unguarded weapons and ammunition inside the cars, which were left with the doors unlocked and were later surrounded by demonstrators. The Mossos were not informed that the cars contained weapons until the afternoon, at that point, the Mossos used a helicopter to verify that no demonstrator entered inside the cars. Eventually, the leaders of ANC and Òmnium, Jordi Sànchez and Jordi Cuixart, were notified there were weapons inside the cars too. At that point, ANC volunteers expanded the human corridor and left the cars inside the corridor, so demonstrators had no access to them. An investigation from the newspaper El Món in 2019, reported that none of the Civil Guard officers that left unguarded weapons inside the cars was sanctioned by the Spanish Ministry of the Interior.

Jordi Sànchez and Jordi Cuixart —leaders of ANC and Òmnium Cultural— and the Mossos d'Esquadra Major Josep Lluís Trapero Álvarez have been accused of sedition, a felony regulated by the article 544 and subsequents of the Spanish Criminal Code, for allegedly encouraging protesters to hinder the Spanish police raids to dismantle the framework of the referendum. Sànchez and Cuixart have been provisionally put into jail without bail pending the investigation.

Besides the demonstration in Barcelona, multiple protests took place in other cities across Catalonia; including cacerolazo during the night. Several Spanish cities also organised demonstrations against the police operations.

In Gran Teatre del Liceu, Barcelona an audience at the representation of Il Viaggio a Reims sang the Catalan anthem, Els Segadors, and shouted pro-Catalan independence slogans.

=== Reactions ===
Dozens of Catalan organizations and entities condemned the jailing of Catalan officials and made calls to respect "democracy and freedom of speech" in Catalonia and asked all citizens to "defend Catalan institutions". Those entities included all Catalan public universities (UB, UAB, UdG, UPF, UdL, URV, UPC, UOC), the biggest Catalan workers and students unions including CCOO and UGT, sport clubs like FC Barcelona and Girona FC, more than 20 professional associations, the Confederation of Neighborhood Associations of Catalonia, NGO's like FundiPau, music festivals like Primavera Sound and cultural organizations like Fundació Antoni Tàpies.

Carles Puigdemont, President of Catalonia, described the raids as a "de facto suspension of Catalonia's self-rule". Ada Colau, Mayor of Barcelona, called the raids "a democratic scandal". Xavier Domènech, from En Comú Podem expressed "all red lines have been crossed". Pablo Iglesias, leader of Spanish Podemos, defined the arrested officials as "political prisoners". Dimitrios Papadimoulis MEP considered the situation was a "very worrying drift" for Spain. Mónica Oltra, co-spokesperson of Valencian Compromís, defined it as "forbidding acts of freedom of expression".

That day, En Comú Podem, ERC and PDeCAT walked out from Spanish Congress as a protest against the police operation.

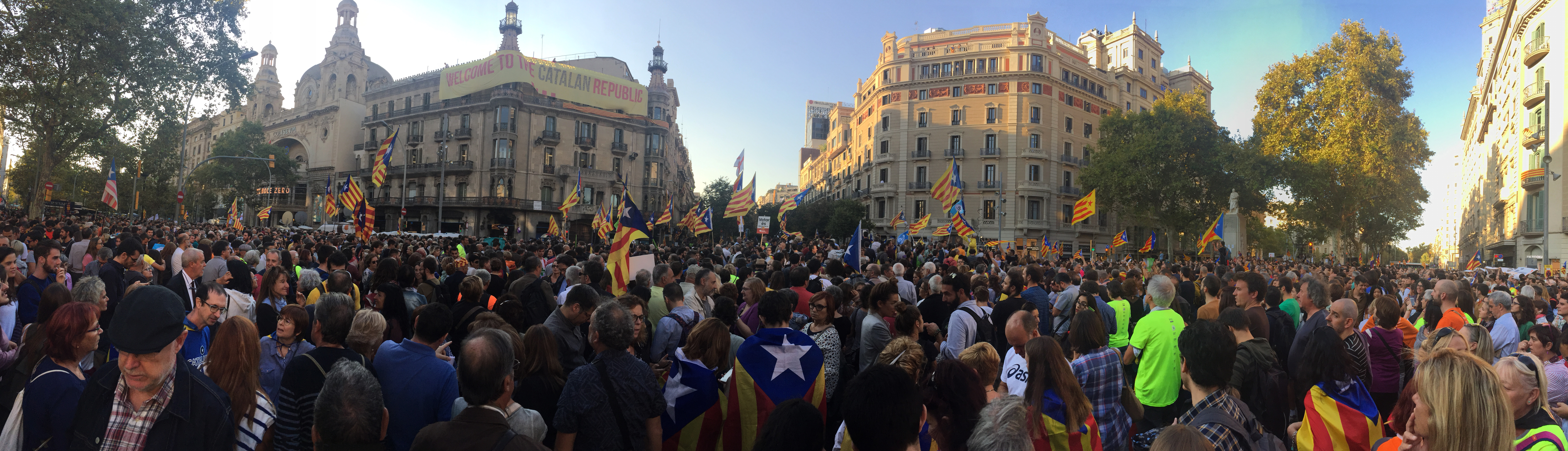
Demonstration in front of the Department of Economy in Barcelona

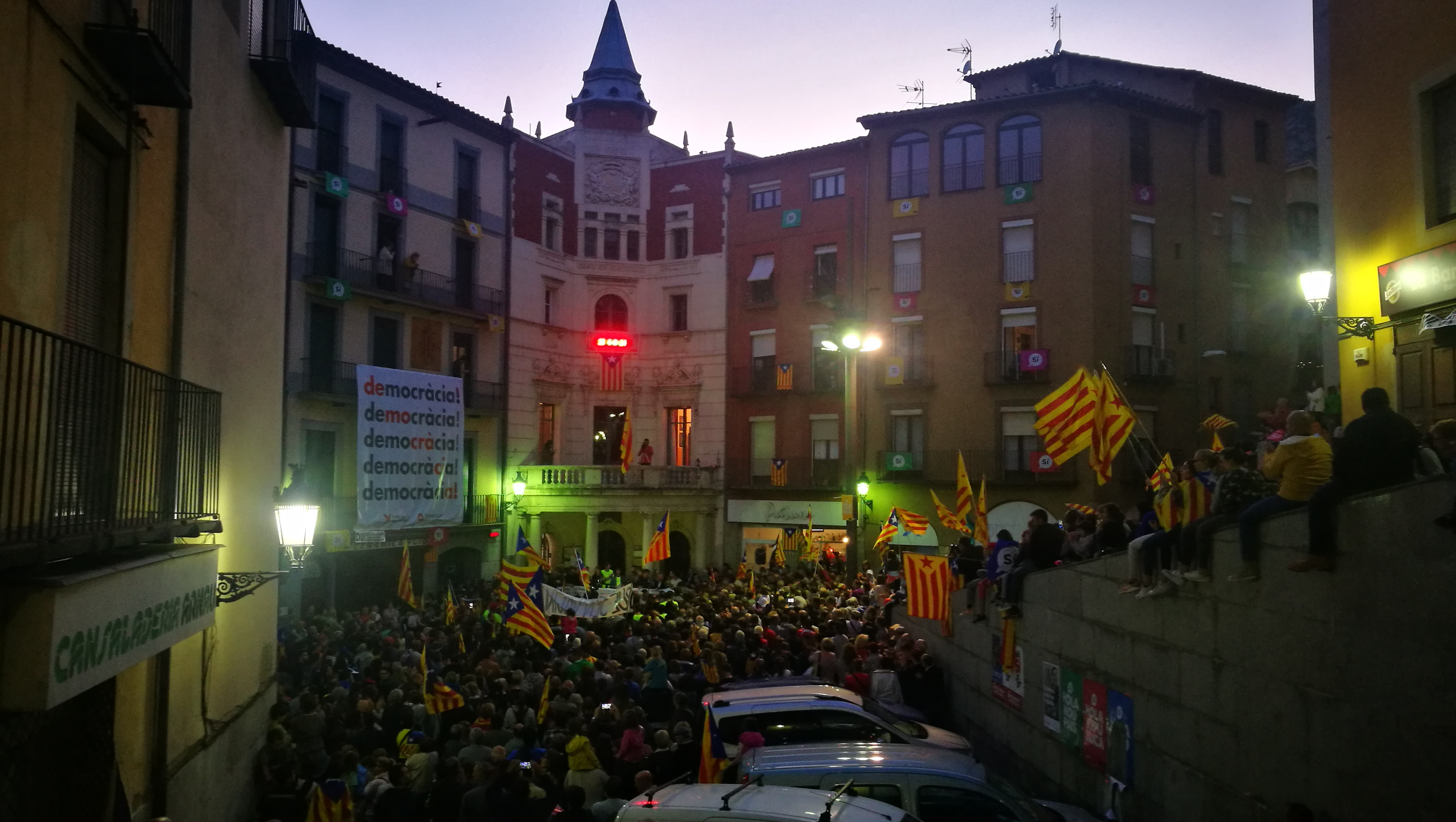
Demonstration in Berga

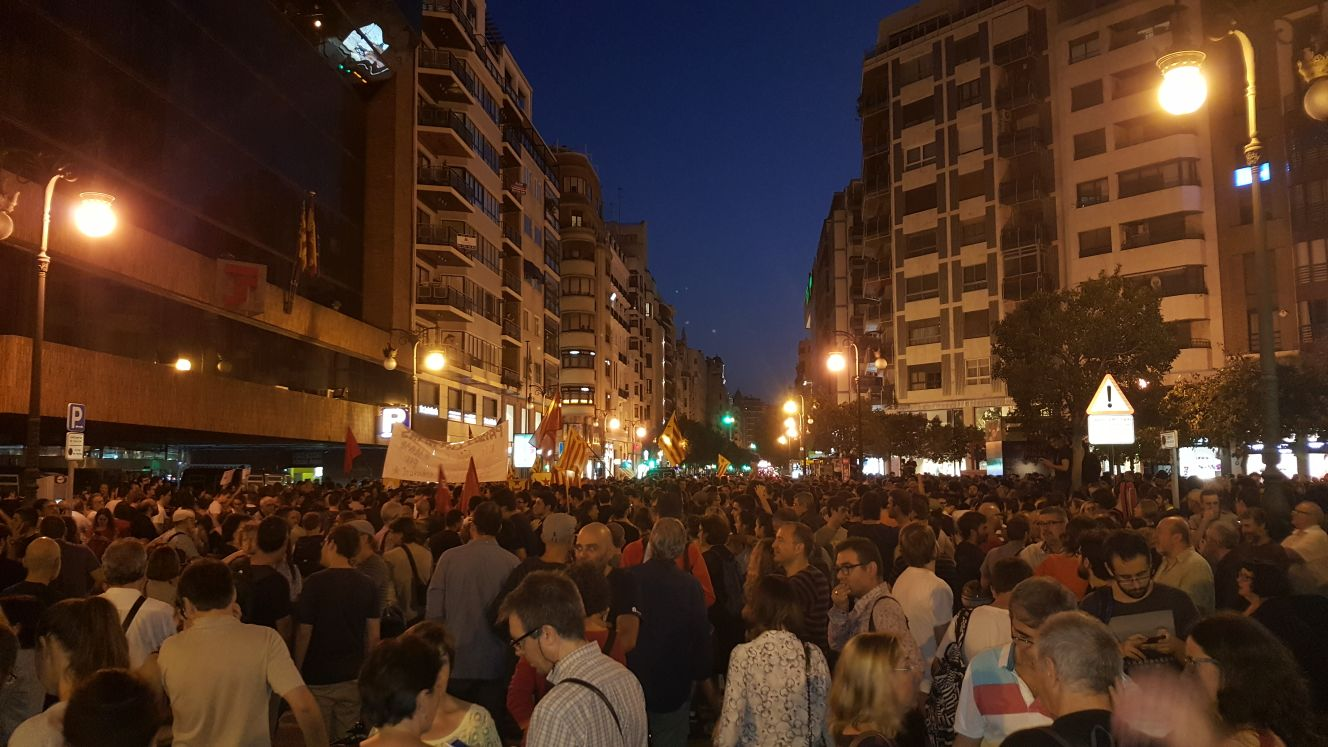
Demonstration in València

== 21 September ==
On 21 September 2017, the President of Catalonia, Carles Puigdemont, publicly announced on Twitter the referendum information webpage had been re-uploaded and gave polling station information and directions. The previous webpage shut down six days after launching, after being declared illegal in court.

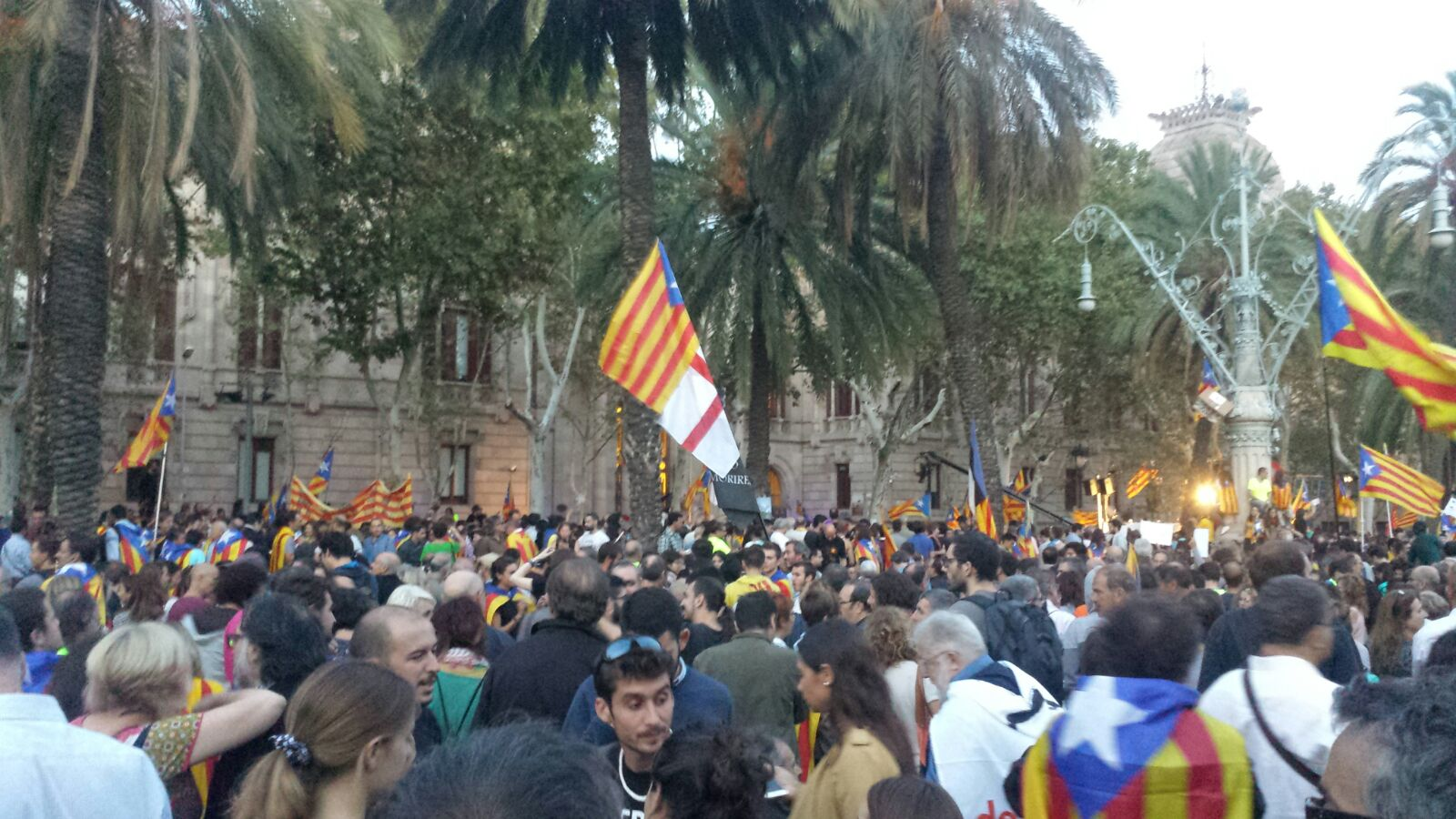
Demonstration on 21 September 2017 in front of the High Court of Justice of Catalonia in support of individuals arrested during police raids.

The Catalan National Assembly and Òmnium Cultural organised a demonstration in Passeig de Lluís Companys in front of the High Court of Justice of Catalonia calling for the release of those, while carrying signs reading "Stop dictatorship" and "We want to vote". During the demonstrations several politicians and public figures spoke and asked the people to continue in permanent mobilisation to defend the institutions of Catalonia.

On the same day, the stevedores and dockworkers of the Port of Barcelona and Port of Tarragona refused to work for the ships that housed the Spanish police after a trade union vote that morning.

University students in some areas abandoned their classes and disrupted traffic on Avinguda Diagonal and joined demonstrations in front of the High Court of Justice of Catalonia. In a separate protest by students traffic on Gran Via, at the old building of the University of Barcelona, was disrupted.

Around 150 people chanting slogans in favour of the police operation or in favour of remaining part of Spain.

In front of the headquarters of the Spanish Civil Guard in Passeig de Gràcia a demonstration of 150 people shouted slogans in favour of the police operation, in favour of remaining unified with Spain, or against the independence referendum. During the demonstration there were clashes with the Mossos d'Esquadra when the protesters tried to stop the traffic.

An open letter from several members of all parties in the UK parliament expressed their concern "by the measures taken by the Spanish government to prevent the referendum". An additional open letter from over a hundred academics of law, human rights and related subjects from the UK and Ireland expressed the same level of concern about the fact "that the level of political repression in Catalonia is of a severity and arbitrary character not experienced since the Franco dictatorship". The Regional Council of Sardinia also unanimously approved a motion on 21 September 2017 expressing solidarity with Catalonia and offering to print and store the necessary ballots for the referendum while asking the international community to intervene and ensure that Catalans could vote and decide on their self-determination.

== 22 September ==
On Friday 22 September, Spanish State Attorney General's office filed a complaint for sedition against the leaders of Catalan National Assembly and Òmnium Cultural, Jordi Sànchez and Jordi Cuixart, accused of having played central roles in orchestrating massive protests aimed at hindering Civil Guard activity. This offence can be punished with sentences of up to 15 years of prison. The investigating judge stated that the leaders did not call for "peaceful demonstration but to the protection of Catalan officials through 'massive citizens' mobilisations" and that Jordi Sànchez, on top of a vehicle, encouraged the demonstrators with expressions such as "no one goes home, it will be a long and intense night". According to the judge the actions of Sànchez and Cruixat are within the scope of sedition, a felony regulated by the article 544 and subsequents of the Spanish Criminal Code:

Conviction for sedition shall befall those who, without being included in the felony of rebellion, public and tumultuously rise up to prevent, by force or outside the legal channels, application of the laws, or any authority, official corporation or public officer from lawful exercise of the duties thereof or implementation of the resolutions thereof, or of administrative or judicial resolutions.

— Article 544 of the Spanish Criminal Code.

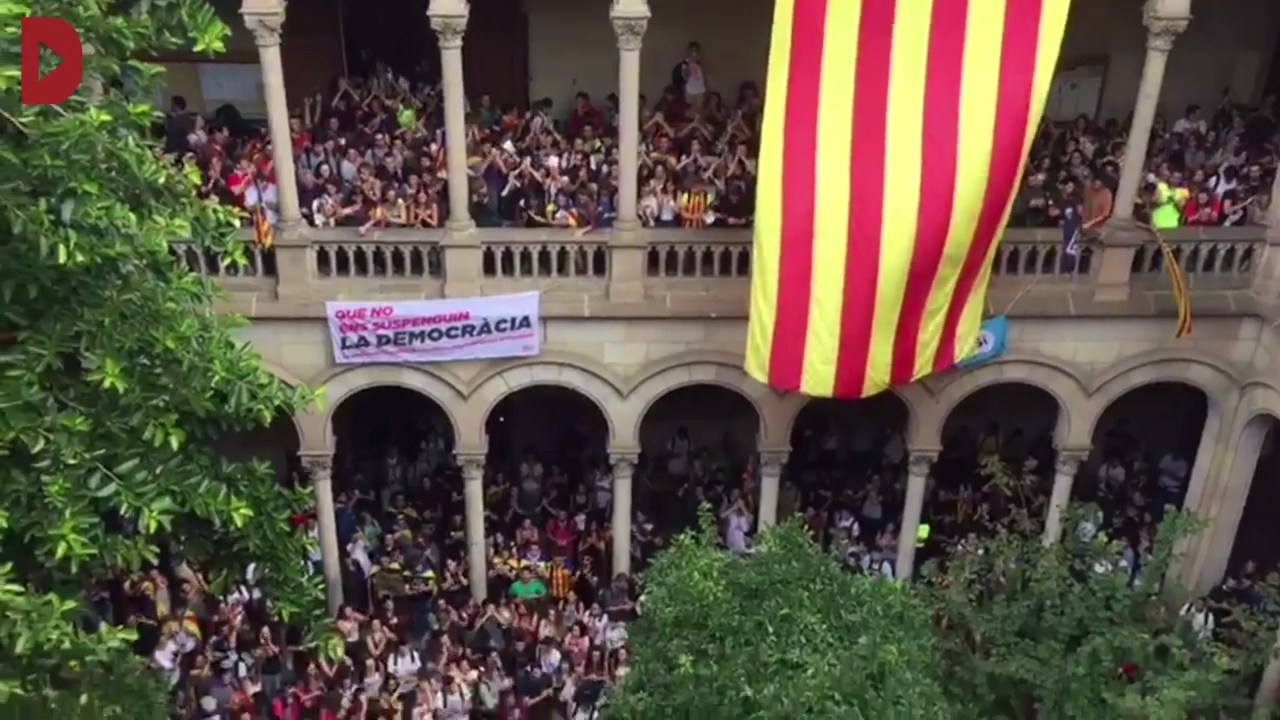
Photo of the students occupying the historical building of the University of Barcelona.

Footage from that night shows Cuixart and Sànchez at 11pm calling off the protests, contradicting the part where the judicial order imprisoning them says that "they did not use at any time the control they had over the people to call off the demonstration they had summoned".

Pro-referendum students from the University of Barcelona occupied the historical building of the university, which is currently used by the faculties of mathematics and philology. In Girona, Tarragona and Lleida there were more student demonstrations in defence of democracy organised by the local Universities.

Later that day, the trial court number 13 finally released all the remaining politicians arrested on 20 September 2017. They were freed being charged with disobedience to the Constitutional Court, perverting the course of justice and embezzlement of public funds but were not accused of sedition. Even though they were released, due to a public prosecutor petition, they will have to appear before the court every week while the probe continues. Around 2,000 people were waiting outside and received them with slogans and chants. At 6pm a new demonstration in front of the High Court of Justice was organised to celebrate their release.

== Digital censorship ==
In the days previous to the referendum, more than 140 websites were shut down by the Spanish justice and police, including the official one from the Catalan government with information about the referendum and dozens of clones made after the first one was blocked. The main site of the biggest civil organization which supports independence, Assemblea Nacional Catalana, was also blocked. In some cases, only a judiciary request was sent but in some others Guardia Civil was sent to major Spanish telecom operators offices, domain providers, the dotCat Foundation and Google, in this particular case to remove an app from Google Play which included information about the polling stations. This situation was defined as "censorship" by many and was denounced by Internet-related organizations from around the world including Internet Society, APC, EFF, The Tor Project and Xnet.

== Accusations of sedition ==
Finally, on October 16 both Jordi Cuixart and Jordi Sànchez were imprisoned accused of sedition and sent to Soto del Real Prison.

Both Mossos d'Esquadra Major Josep Lluís Trapero Álvarez and Barcelona Intendant Teresa Laplana Cocera were also charged with sedition because of the role played by the regional police.

=== Reactions ===
Amnesty International issued an official statement considering the charge of sedition and the preventive imprisonment "excessive" and called for their immediate release.

On 7 March 2018, the High Commissioner of the Office of the United Nations High Commissioner for Human Rights reminded Spanish authorities that "pre-trial detention should be considered a measure of last resort" in reference, between others, to Jordi Cuixart and Jordi Sànchez.

In July 2018, several international personalities including Jody Williams, Noam Chomsky, Angela Davis, Ben Emmerson, Bill Shipsey and Martín Caparrós joined in a video produced by Òmnium and demanded the release of the Catalan leaders.

On 8 August 2018, PEN International made another statement asking Spanish authorities to release Cuixart and Sànchez and considered their detentions to be "an excessive and disproportionate restriction on their right to freedom of expression and peaceful assembly".

The World Organisation Against Torture sent an open letter to the President of the Government of Spain Pedro Sánchez as well as the Spanish Attorney General and Spanish Ombudsman on 22 November 2018 demanding the end of the "arbitrary pre-trial detention and judicial harassment of Jordi Cuixart and Jordi Sànchez" and concluded "OMCT considers that the charges against them are unfounded and must therefore be dropped."

After Sànchez and Cuixart were sentenced to a nine-year sentence, Amnesty International reiterated his petition to immediately release them and denounced that the "vague" and "overly broad" interpretation of sedition done by the Spanish Supreme Court could have negative effects on the freedom of protest in Spain.

== See also ==
- 2014 Catalan self-determination referendum
- Declaration of the Initiation of the Process of Independence of Catalonia
- National Day for Yes
