= SeriesYonkis =

Spanish criminal law case

- Website type: Movies and television streaming
- Available in: Spanish. English.
- Website: seriesyonkis.tv
- Current status: Online

SeriesYonkis
- Court: Judgment of the Criminal Court #4 of Murcia
- Decided: 21 June 2019
- Citations: Judgement N.º 222/2019 of Juzgado de lo Penal N. 4 de Murcia, 21 June 2019
- Cases cited: Svensson v Retriever Sverige AB
- Legislation cited: Spanish Criminal Code Information Society Directive

Court membership
- Judge sitting: Isabel Maria Carrillo Saez

Keywords
- Online Piracy; Intellectual Property; Copyright; Information Society Directive

SeriesYonkis is a case in Spanish criminal law. The four former website operators of the site SeriesYonkis, and the sister sites PeliculasYonkis and VideosYonkis, were charged with copyright infringement due to the provision of hyperlinks to cyberlockers where users could access TV series and movies. The defendants faced up to 4 years in prison and over 550 million euros in damages. The case called into question whether the activity of the webmasters constituted an act of communication to the public, following the requirement of the Spanish Criminal Code within the meaning of the Information Society Directive.

The defendants were acquitted from the charges. The Court held that, at the time of the facts, hyperlinking was not considered as an act of communication to the public under the Spanish Criminal Code.

== Facts ==
Founded in 2007, SeriesYonkis, PeliculasYonkis and VideosYonkis were Spanish websites which, until 2014, provided hyperlinks of TV series and movies organized and classified according to different criteria. Namely, alphabetical order, genre, content, latest releases or latest entries. They often included its synopsis and poster, and a discussion forum for users. The links redirected users to cyberlockers such as Megaupload, where they could access the audiovisual content.

Defendant Alberto founded and operated the sites from 2007 to 2010. In 2008 a film production company reported that the websites were committing a crime. In 2009 the Court issued a search warrant to access the domicile of Alberto and his computer. The Civil Guard did not find evidence of whether the defendant had uploaded audiovisual content to the cyberlockers. Alberto sold the websites to Burn Media SL in 2010. The other three defendants are Alexis, Jordi and David, the owner and partners of Burn Media SL, respectively.

Burn Media SL continued with the provision of hyperlinks. In 2011, Jordi and David sold their shares to Alexis, who in 2014 sold the websites. Since 2014 these websites have not been operational.

== Judgment ==
=== Hyperlinking or content hosting ===
The activity of the websites was the provision of links that redirected users to cyberlockers, where the content was hosted. These links were obtained by unknown third parties, called uploaders, after uploading unauthorised copies of audiovisual content to the cyberlockers. The defendants did not upload any audiovisual content to the cyberlockers, they had no control over the proper functioning of the hyperlinks, and they did not check their effectiveness. The Court concluded that the activity of the websites was limited to hyperlinking because they did not host any audiovisual content.

=== Hyperlinking as an act of communication to the public ===
==== Spanish Criminal Code from 2007 to 2014 ====
At the time of the facts, from 2007 to 2014, Article 270 of the Spanish Criminal Code included as actus reus the acts of replication, plagiarism, distribution and the communication to the public of any authorised copies of works protected by copyright. The discussion of this case was focused on whether the provision of links, obtained by third parties, to cyberlockers by websites which do not host any audiovisual content, constitutes an act of communication to the public according to the Spanish Criminal Code.

Since the concept of 'act of communication to the public' is not defined in the Spanish Criminal Code, the Court referred to the Spanish Intellectual Property Law, which states that the act of making works available to the public in such a way that anyone can access them, amounts to an act of communication. The Court examined multiple rulings from different Audiencias Provinciales of Spain of similar cases coetaneous to the time of the activities carried out by the defendants, and held that the majority of cases found that hyperlinking did not amount to an act of communication to the public.

==== Case law from the Court of Justice of the European Union ====
In February 2014, the Court of Justice of the European Union interpreted the meaning of 'act of communication to the public' under Article 3(1) of the Information Society Directive in the case Svensson v Retriever Sverige AB. This decision set out the following criteria:

- An ‘act of communication’ includes making works available to the public in a way that they can access them.
- Redirecting users via a hyperlink to protected works falls within the meaning of `making available' and therefore constitutes an 'act of communication'.
- The 'public' refers to a large number of recipients, who were not targeted by a previous communication.

The Court of Justice of the European Union, therefore, stated in 2014 that hyperlinking qualifies as an act of communication. Subsequent case law of the Court of Justice of the European Union has reiterated this doctrine. Following the decisions of the Court of Justice of the European Union, Spanish case law held that hyperlinking constituted an act of communication to the public under the Spanish Criminal Code.

The Spanish Criminal Court held that although the activities of the webmasters of SeriesYonkis would qualify, after the decisions of the Court of Justice of the European Union, as an act of communication to the public; for the purposes of Criminal Law, these decisions cannot be applied retroactively to the time of the activities carried out by the defendants. The Court argued that the principle of non-retroactivity of unfavourable laws should be extended to case law. Article 9.3 of the Spanish Constitution sets out the prohibition of retroactivity of provisions that are not favourable to individuals. Although this article only refers to laws, the Court stated that, from a substantive point of view, a radical change of the criterion previously and repeatedly held by courts which leads to unfavourable consequences for individuals, does not differ from the retroactive application of an unfavourable provision. According to the Court, the prohibition of retroactivity of unfavourable sanctioning laws is closely related to the principle of legal certainty, which would be diminished if a profound change of previous case law leads to the application of the law in a more unfavourable way. The Court noted that the webmaster of SeriesYonkis, PeliculasYonkis and VideosYonkis in 2014, Alexis, ceased the activity of the websites when the Court of Justice of the European Union issued the Svensson decision.

==== Amendment of the Spanish Criminal Code ====
In 2015, several provisions of the Spanish Criminal Code were amended. The reform added a new paragraph to Article 270, Article 270(2), which includes as actus reus the act of enabling the access to unauthorised copies of works protected by copyright, in particular, by displaying classified lists of links to these copies, even if the links are provided by the users. The Court concluded that the explicit reference to hyperlinking in Article 270(2) confirms that this activity was not previously considered a crime.

== Reactions ==
One of the plaintiffs, the Audiovisual Producers' Rights Management Body (EGEDA), has announced that it will appeal the decision.

== See also ==
- Copyright aspects of hyperlinking and framing
- GS Media v Sanoma
- The Pirate Bay trial
