= Altsasu (play) =

2021 play by María Goiricelaya

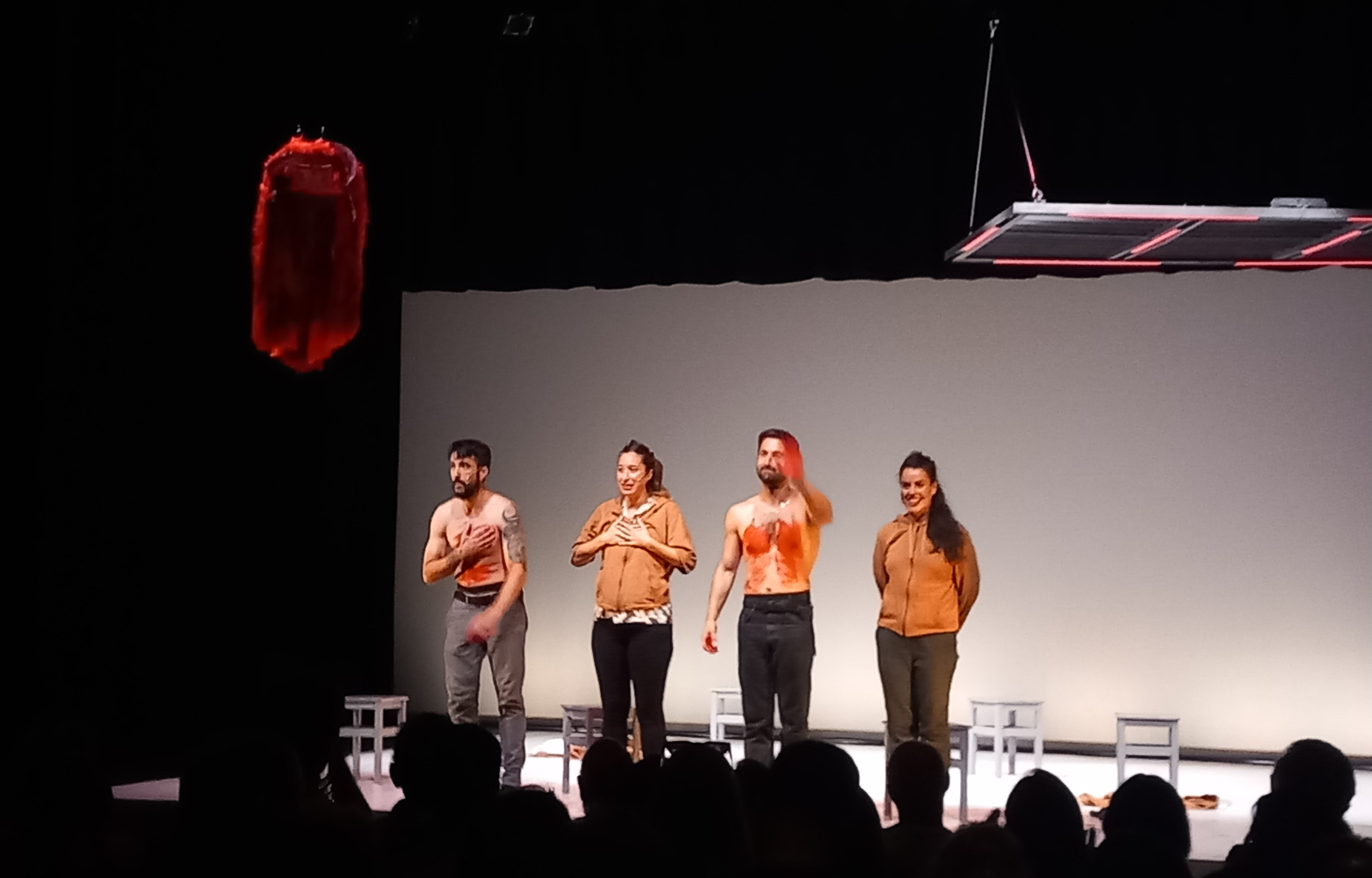
- Ovation for the performers at the end of the performance of "Altsasu" at the Teatre de l'Ateneu de Tàrrega
- Written by: María Goiricelaya
- Based on: Altsasu incident (2016)
- Original language: Basque, Spanish
- Genre: Drama
- Setting: Spain in 2016

Premiere
- Date premiered: October 28, 2021
- Original run: Teatro Arriaga

Altsasu is a 2021 play written and directed by María Goiricelaya. The play criticizes the use of violence and denounces the judicial disproportion in the arrest and imprisonment of young people in relation to the Altsasu incident.

Born from the Cicatrizar theatre project in order to "not open wounds, but heal them", the play was performed in both Basque and Spanish. It stars Nagore González, Egoitz Sánchez, Aitor Borobia and Ane Pikaza Ereño, who simultaneously play the roles of local youth and police officers and, consequently, of the two parties in conflict.

== Plot ==
On the morning of 15 October 2016, a riot broke out at the Koxka bar in the Navarrese town of Altsasu. Several neighbours, two Spanish Civil Guard officers and their respective partners were involved in the fight. The confrontation resulted in the arrest of two neighbors and a sprained ankle for the lieutenant. Subsequently, and in less than 24 hours, the town became the focus of all media attention and the case became a matter of state. Meanwhile, the officers involved refuse to testify before the Policía Foral and prefer to do so before their colleagues from the Spanish Civil Guard.

At the judicial level, the case took an unexpected turn when the Collective of Victims of Terrorism in the Basque Country (COVITE) reported the events to the Spanish National Court. This led to the categorization of the brawl as terrorism and the start of a police operation to arrest nine residents, seven of whom were sent to prison. At the oral hearing, which began on 16 April 2018, the public prosecutor requested sentences of between 12 and 62 years in prison for eight of them. The trial was highly anticipated throughout the state, as its outcome could constitute a new curtailment of freedoms as well as an even more extensive judicial interpretation of the crime of terrorism as a typical crime.

== Premiere ==
It premiered on 28 and 29 October 2021 at the Teatro Arriaga in Bilbao, in Basque and Spanish respectively. Later, other sessions were held such as on 11 November at the Teatro Principal Antzokia in Vitòria in Basque, on 12 November in Lasarte-Oria in Spanish, on 13 November in Durango in Spanish, on 14 November in Pasaia in Basque, on 21 November in Mutriku in Spanish, on 26 November in Elorrio in Basque, on 27 and 28 November at the Gasteszena in San Sebastián in Basque, and on 28 December in Beasain in Basque. Originally, the play was originally planned to be performed in a total of 18 municipalities in the Basque Country.

On 18 January 2024, it premiered in Madrid, specifically at the Teatre de l'Abadia, located in the Chamberí district. The play was preceded by a protest rally called by the far-right Vox party, which failed in its attempt to boycott the premiere. Likewise, a second call on the street defended the artistic freedom and expression of the play with a banner that bore the slogan "No to censorship".

On 6 April 2024 it premiered in the Catalan Countries as one of the highlights of the 2023–2024 season at the Espai Ter in Torroella de Montgrí (Baix Empordà). Subsequently, on 29 August 2024, it was performed at the Palau de Congressos de Tarragona (Tarragonès) as part of the FITT Noves Dramatúrgies festival, and from October 1 to 6 of the same year at the Teatre Romea de Barcelona (Barcelonès). On 19 October 2024, it was performed at the Teatre de Salt (Gironès) on the occasion of the Temporada Alta - Festival de Tardor de Catalunya and on 30 May 2025 at the Teatre-Auditori Sant Cugat (Vallès Occidental), with the subsequent colloquium "let's talk about..." between the audience and the members of the company.

== Criticism ==
Ainhoa Domaica, spokesperson for the People's Party of the Basque Country in the Vitoria City Council, accused the play, featured on the bill for the International Theatre Festival held in the city, as an example of "nationalist indoctrination" imposed on "Vitoria society" by the local government of Mayor Gorka Urtaran and called for its withdrawal from the program for "contempt of justice and the media".

In turn, Eskena, an association of stage producers in the Basque Country, responded in a statement with "its strongest rejection of the attempt to censor the performance of the play Altsasu", expressing its desire to "defend what is obvious: freedom of expression in the full breadth of human expressions, such as art and theatre in particular, which constitutes an essential element of democracy and a trait that defines the civilization of society", and asserted that there was "no reason that can justify the economic and moral damage that this act of intolerance seeks to cause to the free professional exercise of the company". Finally, it also pointed out that the decision to take advantage of or reject "this unique opportunity that arises in each performance" is solely the responsibility of the spectator "who cannot be denied the right to be: there is no surplus of the play, there are surplus of censors".

The work was nominated for the Premis Max in the categories of best theater show and best theatrical authorship of the 2023.
