= Teresa Laplana =

Teresa Laplana i Cocera (born 1961) is a Spanish police officer, lieutenant of the Mossos d'Esquadra, the Catalonia's regional police.

== Biography ==
Laplana was born in Barcelona and joined the body with the promotion of 1985, the first one that allowed women to enter. She has been assigned to various destinations, such as the prison of Ponent, Tarragona, the police station of Sant Andreu neighborhood in Barcelona, and in August 2014 she was appointed as the head of the Eixample police station. After the events of 2017, she has been assigned to the Police Department of Barcelona in non-operational tasks.

She has participated in several occasions in the World Police and Fire Games, where she has won several medals in swimming.

== Catalan independence crisis and judicial process ==
She was the head of the operation of the officers who provided coverage and protection at the entrance and registry at the headquarters of the Vice President and Counselor of Economy of the Catalan cabinet on 20 October 2017 by the Civil Guard. In the Trial of Catalonia independence leaders, she is accused of sedition.

On 4 October 2017 was called by the Spanish Supreme Court to testify amid the sedition crime and on 16 April 2018, the Judge of the National Court Carmen Lamela prosecuted Teresa Laplana Intendant for a crime of sedition for the events of the 20 and 21 September in the Ministry of Economy, but ruled she and Josep Lluís Trapero must remain free. Finally the prosecutor's office of this court requested 4 years in prison and 11 of absolute disqualification for the crime of sedition.

== See also ==
- Operation Anubis
- 2017–18 Spanish constitutional crisis
