= Battle of Alsasua =

Battle of the First Carlist War

- Part of the First Carlist War
Date	22 April 1834
Location	Alsasua (Altsasu), Navarre, Spain 42.8953°N 2.1689°W
Result	Carlist victory

Belligerents
Carlists supporting Infante Carlos of Spain	Liberals (Isabelinos or Cristinos) supporting Isabella II of Spain and her regent mother Maria Christina

Commanders and leaders
Tomás de Zumalacárregui	Vicente Genaro de Quesada

Casualties and losses
200 dead and wounded	450 dead and wounded and 400 prisoners, including the capture of a full infantry company.
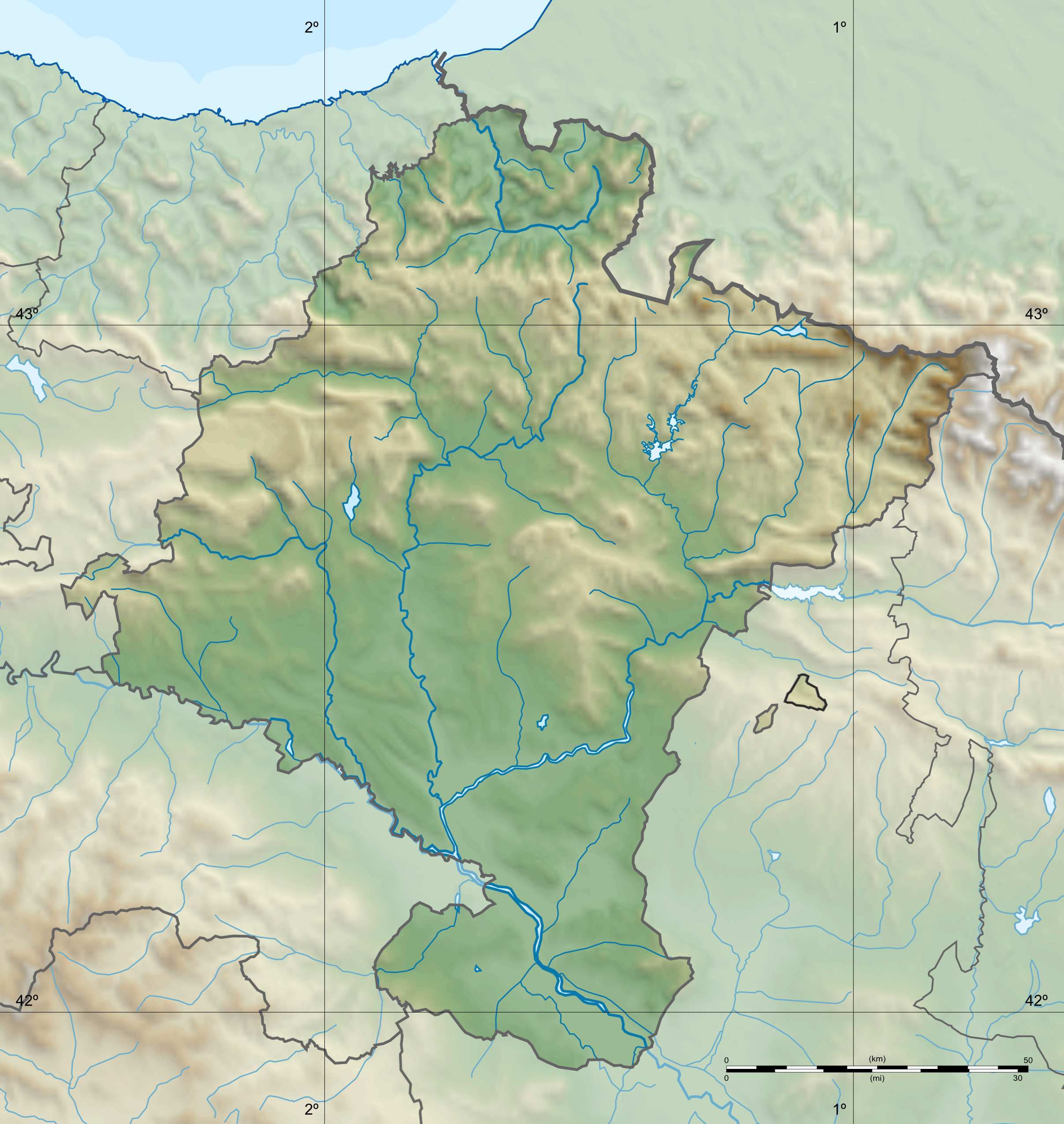
- Location of Alsasua within Navarre

The Battle of Alsasua, also known as the Battle of Altsasu or la Acción de la Venta de Alsasua (in Spanish "action of the inn at Alsasua"), occurred on April 22, 1834, in Navarre, Spain, during the First Carlist War. Carlist general Tomás de Zumalacárregui attacked a convoy led by the Liberal general Vicente Genaro de Quesada traveling from Vitoria-Gasteiz to Pamplona at the town of Alsasua.

The Liberals suffered many casualties and Zumalacárregui took many prisoners, as well as half a million reals. The decision of both generals to execute most of their prisoners after a failed exchange negotiation set the ruthless tone with which POWs would be treated throughout the conflict. In addition, it strained Liberal supply lines in the area and was part of Zumalacárregui's successful guerrilla campaign until his death in the siege of Bilbao in 1835.

== Background ==
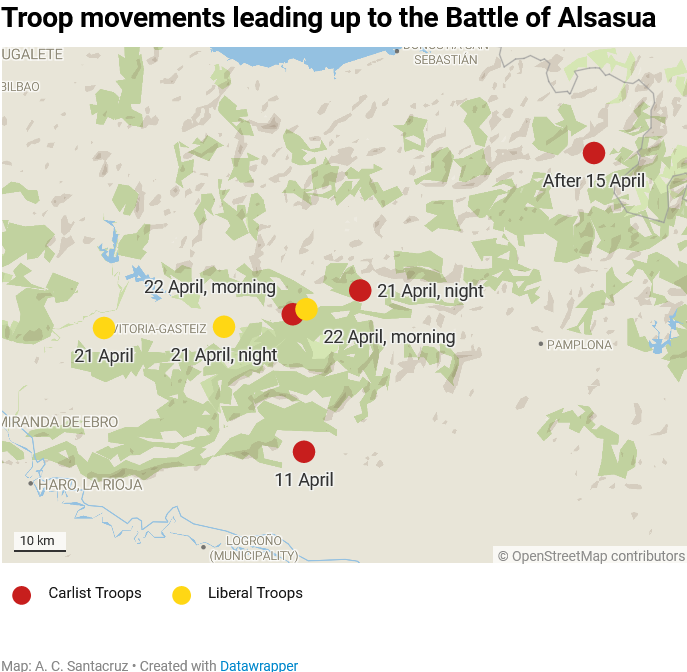
Troop movements under Quesada and Zumalacárregui leading up to the Battle of Alsasua

This battle was one of the first in the First Carlist War, a succession war between Infante Carlos of Spain and his niece Isabella II of Spain. The Carlists were insurrectionary reactionary traditionalists that had only managed to secure support in the Basque region, Navarre, and areas of East Spain and had minimal international support. The Isabelinos, on the other hand, managed to prevent the majority of the kingdom for joining the insurrectionists, had access to many more men and resources than the Carlists, and controlled the central government. However, they had implemented various liberal, secular reforms that were highly unpopular amidst an economic crisis and so the Carlists had popular support in the majority of regions where the war was fought. In light of these factors, the Carlists decided on a strategy of guerrilla warfare: raiding supply convoys, engaging in ambushes or using their superior knowledge of terrain to defeat Liberals when possible. It is in this context that the Battle of Alsasua was fought.

Alsasua lies 41 km east of Vitoria-Gasteiz and 85 km west from Pamplona. Geographically, the town sits between mountains dividing the Álava and Pamplona basins. Charles Frederick Henningsen described it as the "largest town in Navarre". An alternative northern route avoiding Alsasua would have necessitated crossing the basque mountains, while a southern one would have required either crossing the mountains near modern-day Izki Natural Park or a longer route through Logroño. However, sources do not mention Quesada considering another route and similarly do not mention any Carlist doubts as to the path the convoy would take. Thus, the geographic context set up a pitched battle between the two sides.

The battle took place after a time of relative peace in the Navarran area of operations, where both sides were gathering supplies and strengthening their forces. On April 1, Zumalacárregui had published an address to his Navarrese and Alavese troops offering rewards for distinguished soldiers, which Carlos endorsed in a personal letter to the general a week later.

Zumalacárregui and Quesada had fought against each other multiple times before in the war as the Carlist general pursued a guerrilla strategy of smaller-scale engagements and convoy attacks resulting in between a few dozen and up to 200 dead per side, without them being considered full battles. One source commented on the frequent marches that the strategy demanded, saying "In one side and the other those poor soldiers were always in movement. Quesada believed he gained advantages from pursuing the Carlists relentlessly, running after them [...] Zumalacárregui started to fear the persecution that gave him neither truce nor rest".

Quesada left Vitoria on April 21, with a reserve brigade of two infantry battalions, one grenadier battalion, one sniper company, twenty carabiniers, two cavalry units, and four mountaineer sub-units, carrying with him "in passing" 500,000 gold reals in order to pay Liberal troops in Navarre. As soldiers were in short supply, his forces were weak relative to the goods they carried with them. However, before leaving Vitoria Quesada had ordered General Lorenzo Fernández to reinforce the convoy with his troops by morning on the next day in Salvatierra.

He stayed overnight in Salvatierra awaiting Fernández's reinforcements which did not materialize, then marched to Alsasua. General Quesada had expected an attack in the vicinities of Alsasua, but could not have predicted the absence of the necessary reinforcements, which he would later blame for the defeat. However, Fernandez's troops were tied up aiding officer Armildez de Toledo against the Carlists elsewhere. Quesada's scouts were unable to provide information on Zumalacárregui's strength or movements until their arrival to the town, though a lack of farmers on his way there led him to take "opportune precautions".

Zumalacárregui had slept in Etxarri-Aranatz and had eight battalions under his command, four of which had joined him that same night.

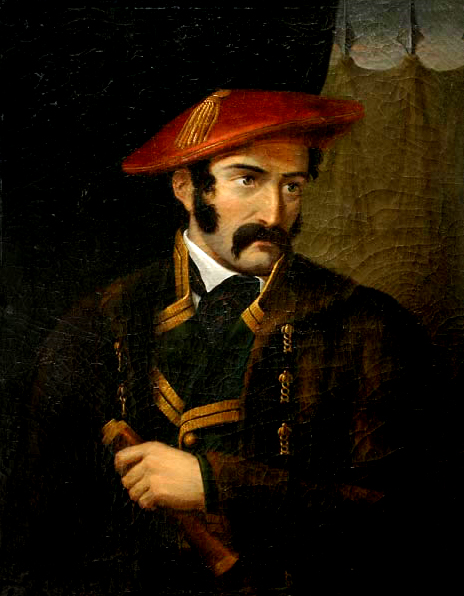
Carlist General Zumalacárregui

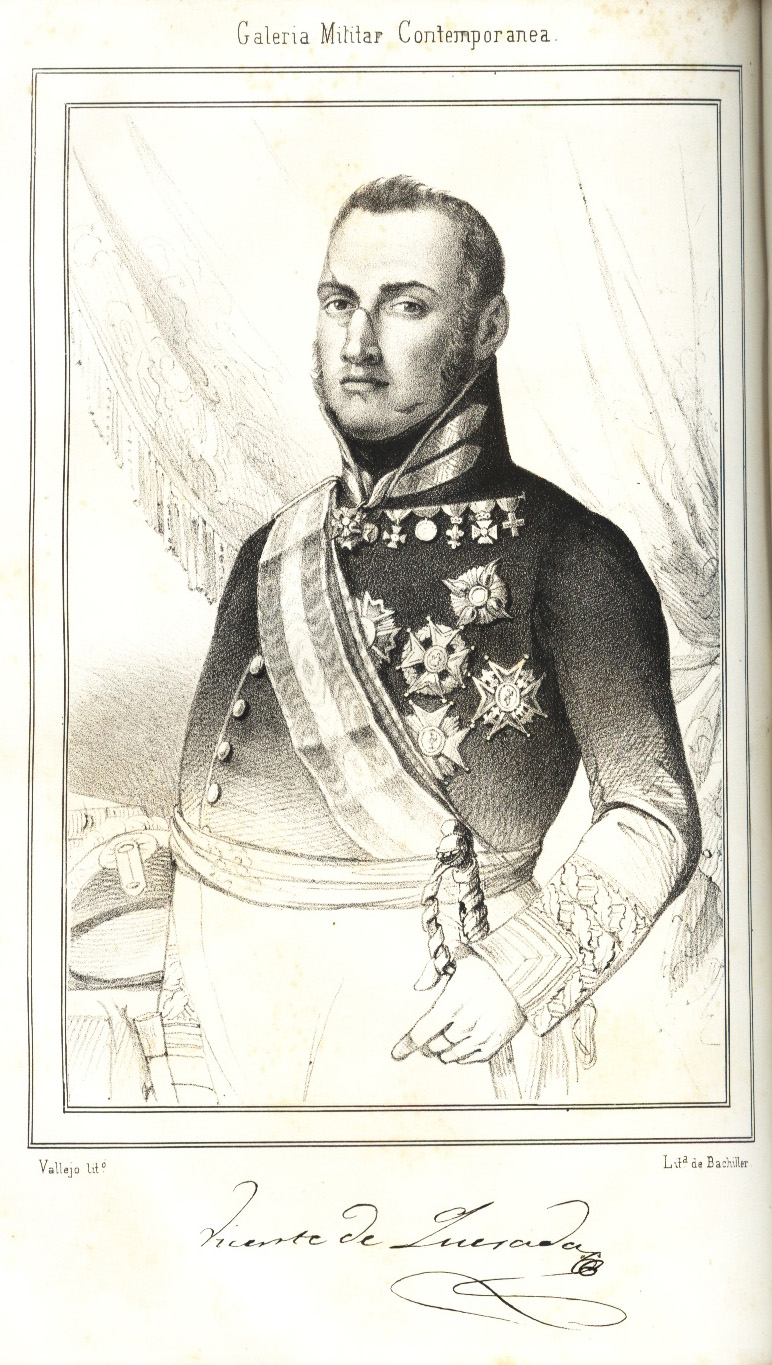
Liberal General Quesada

== Battle ==
In the morning of April 22, Zumalacárregui ordered fifty cavalrymen and their guides on reconnaissance duty and to act as bait for Quesada while his troops waited in ambush in the woods near the towns of Ciordia and Olazagutia. However, Quesada was well aware of the possibility of an ambush and, after consulting maps of the local topography and deliberating with his infantry lieutenant and carabinier sergeant, continued forward with an altered formation. While his vanguard would lead the way, the convoy's baggage, artillery, and cavalry would instead proceed through a left flank through a makeshift bridge so that they could get to a clearing of the path and themselves take the Carlists by surprise. Retreating or delaying the engagement, as Quesada observed, was not an option in this terrain.

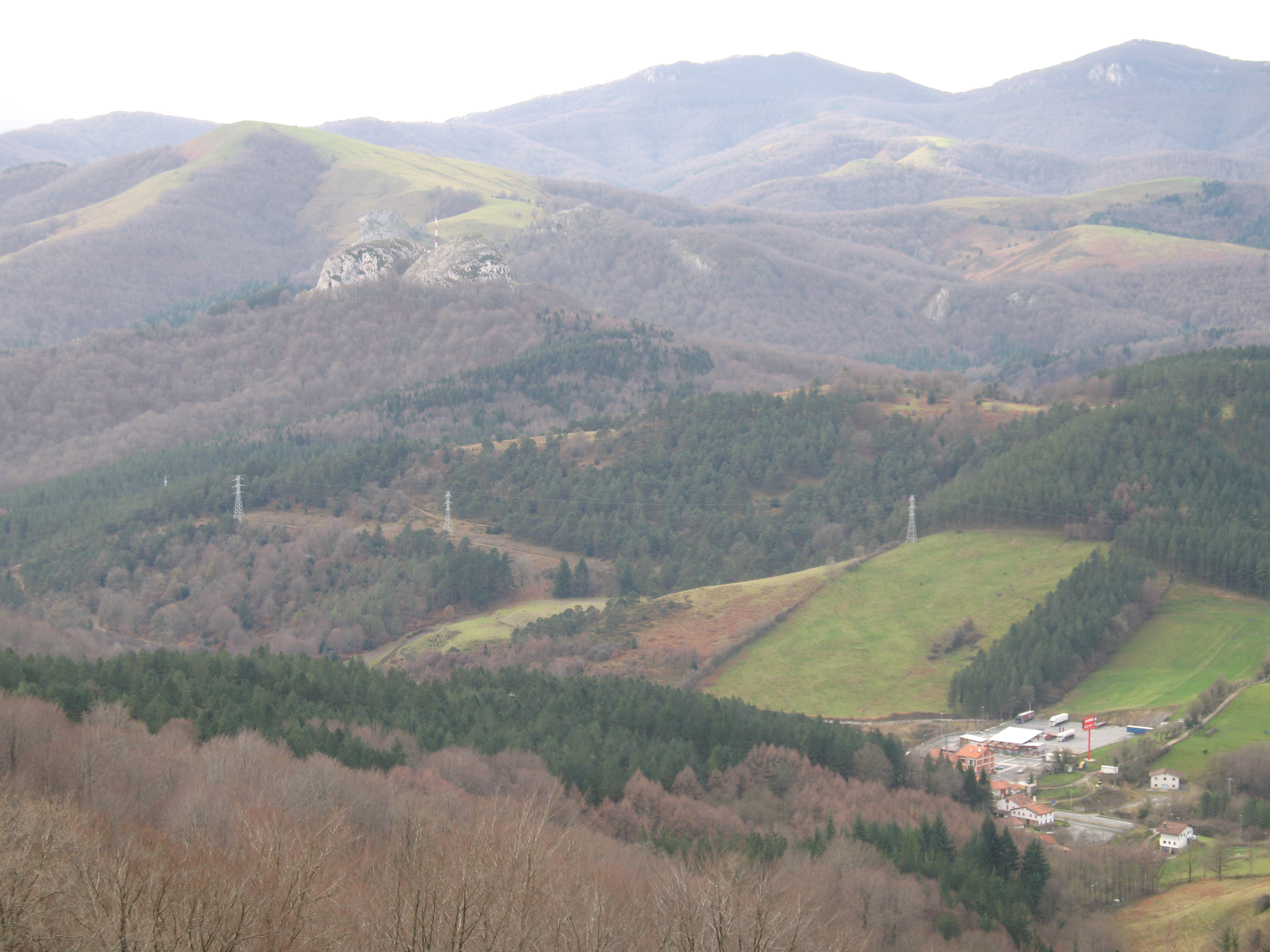
Modern day Etzegarate pass on the bottom right, where a service station can be seen at its tail

The engagement started shortly thereafter. Quesada's forces, significantly outnumbered, were in "critical condition" an hour into the fighting. However, his vanguard managed to stave off the Carlists with enough success as to allow the rest of his forces to reach less disadvantageous terrain. However, the terrain was rough and the soldiers had to cross multiple streams with water "up to their thigh and stomach" until they were able to reach the Etzegarate pass.

Quesada established a semi-circular formation with most of his forces and a second regiment's second battalion of regional volunteers covering the main path from Zumalacárregui's position, while two sections of the fourth Royal Guard Infantry regiment and 40 carabiniers guarded the peak of the elevation. Meanwhile, he positioned his artillery at the centre of the semicircle and behind it the convoy's baggage and cavalry as well as a battle hospital. The Carlist forces attacked repeatedly and while they managed to take control of the elevation, they were unable to maintain the position, which allowed Quesada to retreat towards Villafranca, albeit losing the baggage in the process.

== Result ==
Quesada, cut off from a retreat towards Vitoria by the Carlist forces, had to hike to Gipuzkoa through the mountains with less than 150 men to avoid further combat and would not arrive in Pamplona until April 27. Leopoldo O'Donnell, commander of the Royal Guard, was amongst those captured by the Carlists.

After the encounter, Zumalacárregui spent the night at Echarri and ordered most of the prisoners to be shot "in just reprisal to the inhumane conduct which the usurper government was observing"—the execution of Carlists by Liberals as political criminals. He threatened to shoot the 100 remaining prisoners he still held if Carlists weren't treated as prisoners of war rather than political prisoners, while allowing various officers to avoid their possible execution, although how they did so is unclear in contemporary sources.

Zumalacárregui and Quesada attempted to engage in an exchange of prisoners, but negotiations were unsuccessful. Quesada did not view the Carlists as honorable enough to negotiate equally with (calling Zumalacárregui "chief of the brigands") and requested them to release their officer prisoners under threat of executing the parents and family members of Carlist soldiers. Zumalacárregui saw the threats as morally unforgivable, as "[the parents] were foreign to the struggle we are involved in", and announced so in his response. He executed his prisoners and Quesada shortly followed on his threat. Two days after the battle, Zumalacárregui commended his troops with special mention to the 1st Navarrese battalion.

The battle cut Pamplona off from supplies from Vitoria, leaving the Navarrese capital vulnerable to on-and-off sieges throughout the war.
