= María Goiricelaya =

Spanish theatre actress (born 1983)

- Born: María Goiricelaya Burón; 26 January 1983 (age 43); Bilbao, Spain
- Citizenship: Spain
- Education: University of the Basque Country (BA); Royal Central School of Speech and Drama (MA); King Juan Carlos University (MA); University of the Basque Country (PhD); Open University of Catalonia (MA)
- Occupations: theater director, playwright, dramaturge, actress, voice specialist, university teacher and theater researcher
- Years active: 2010-present
- Employer(s): Antena 3 (Spanish TV channel); University of the Basque Country; Centro Dramático Nacional; Ánima Eskola School of Drama
- Awards: Max Award

María Goiricelaya Burón (born 26 January 1983) is a Spanish theatre director, playwright, dramaturge, actress, voice specialist, university teacher and theatre researcher.

== Life and career ==
In 2005 she graduated in audiovisual communication from the University of the Basque Country (UPV/EHU). In 2006 she completed a postgraduate degree in Theatre and Performing Arts at the University of the Basque Country (UPV/EHU). In 2007 she completed an MA in Music Theatre at the Royal Central School of Speech & Drama (University of London). In 2009 she completed a Master in Performing Arts at the Rey Juan Carlos University.

In 2016 she got a doctorate degree (PhD) in Theatre and Performing Arts from the Faculty of Fine Arts of the University of the Basque Country (UPV/EHU) with her thesis: "The actor's vocal training in the 20th and 21st centuries. Towards an anthropology of the scenic voice". In 2019 she got a master's degree in Cultural Management at the Open University of Catalonia (UOC).

Voice specialist, she has also trained at the Royal School of Dramatic Art (RESAD) in Madrid, the Roy Hart Center (France), Teatr Piesn Kozla (Poland), Yoshi Oida (Romania), as well as in Spanish Classical Text and Verse. Since 2008 she has been part of the Basque theatre company KABIA as an actress and researcher and of the TARTEAN company. She worked for eight years as a news reporter (Antena 3) and also as a voice teacher in numerous acting schools in the Basque Country.

Currently she is the artistic programmer at the Sala BBK in Bilbao. Since 2021 she has been part of the National Drama Centre (CDN) in Madrid from its Drama Residencies program. She is also a professor at the Ánima Eskola School of Drama (Bilbao).

== Filmography ==
=== Stage ===
- 2018, Ocaña
- 2019, Lyceum Club
- 2020, Ama Kuraia / Madre Coraje
- 2020, El patio de mi casa / Harri Orri Ar
- 2021, Yerma
- 2021, Altsasu

== Awards ==
- 2021, Residency at the National Drama Center.
- 2021, Finalist in the XXIV edition of the Max Awards for the Performing Arts for El patio de mi casa.
- 2021, Candidate for six Max Awards for the Performing Arts for Ama Kuraia / Madre Coraje.
