= Concepción Espejel =

Spanish magistrate (born 1959)

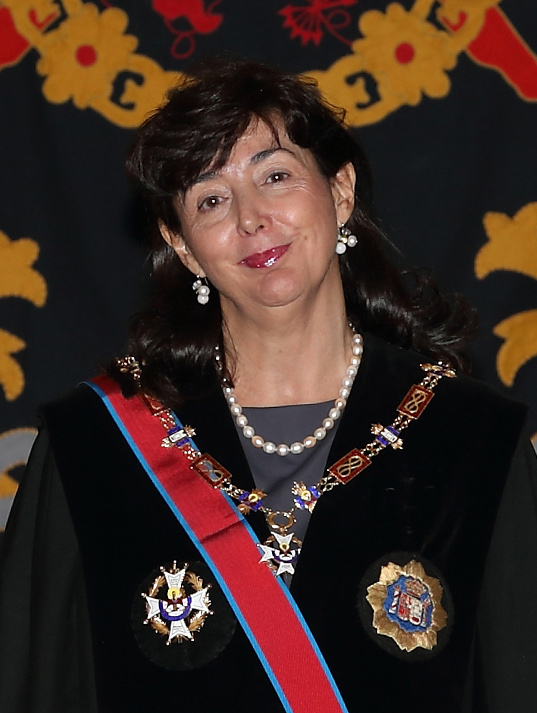
- Espejel in 2011

Magistrate of the Constitutional Court
- Incumbent
- Assumed office 17 November 2021

Personal details
- Born: Concepción Espejel Jorquera; 15 September 1959 (age 67) Madrid, Spain
- Education: ICADE

Concepción Espejel Jorquera (born 15 September 1959) is a Spanish magistrate, member of the Constitutional Court of Spain since 2021.

== Biography ==
Espejel was born on 15 September 1959 in Madrid. She joined the judicial career in 1983, after passing a (minor) public examination to the post of district judge. She had Vinaroz, Valls and Reus as early destinations. From 1987 to 2008, she worked as magistrate in the provincial audiencias of Tarragona, Segovia and Guadalajara. In Guadalajara, she assumed the pre-trial investigation on the 2005 Guadalajara forest fire.

She served as member of the General Council of the Judiciary (CGPJ) during the 2008–2013 term. After her spell at the CGPJ, she returned to the judicial career and entered the Audiencia Nacional.

She was recused (at least 6 times) of procedures related to the Gürtel case because of her proximity to the People's Party (alongside fellow magistrate Enrique López). In 2017, the CGPJ elected her nonetheless to lead the Criminal Chamber of the Audiencia Nacional, in replacement of Fernando Grande-Marlaska. As president of said chamber, she participated in the trial of the so-called Altsasu case, which was eventually taken to the Strasbourg Court in order to determine if the accused had a fair trial.

In October 2021, after a tentative deal struck between the national government and the opposition, she was reported to be one of the incoming members of the Constitutional Court. The Congress of Deputies approved her nomination on 11 November 2021 and was appointed on 17 November. She was sworn in the following day.
