= Vicente Genaro de Quesada =

Spanish military figure

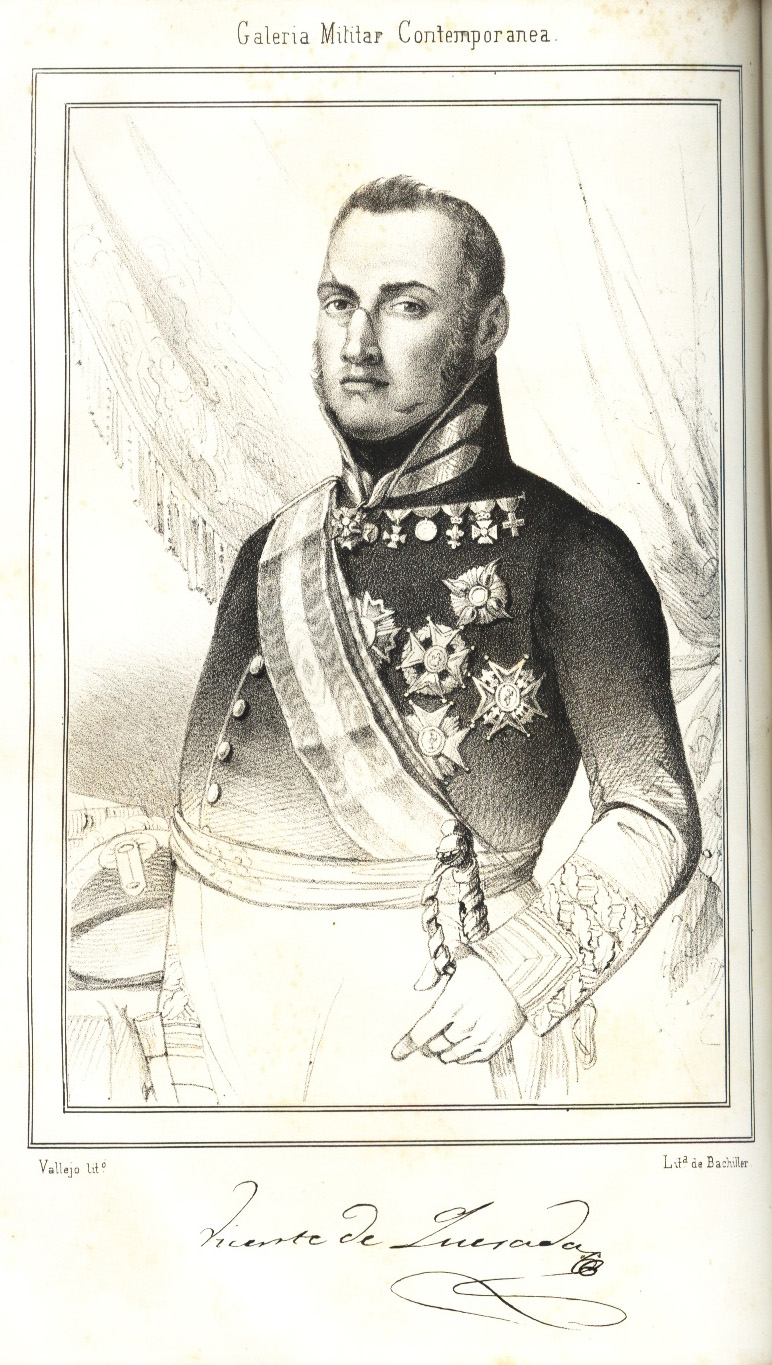
Vicente Genaro de Quesada

Vicente Genaro de Quesada (1782 in Havana, Cuba – 15 August 1836, in Madrid) was a Spanish military figure. He participated in the Battle of Burgos (1808) during the Peninsular War, leading the Royal Guard and Walloon Guards. Forming a rearguard for the shattered Spanish lines, these troops absorbed repeated charges by General Lasalle's French cavalry without yielding any ground.

He later fought in the First Carlist War on the Isabeline (Liberal) side, losing the Battle of Alsasua in April 1834. After the Mutiny of La Granja in August 1836, he tried to suppress demonstrations in Madrid in support of restoring the Constitution of 1812. The next day, with the queen regent having acceded to the demands of the mutineers, he fled to the village of Hortaleza, but was captured and killed there by a crowd including members of the National Militia.
