= Juan Antonio Ramírez Sunyer =

Spanish engineer, judge

Juan Antonio Ramírez Sunyer (9 September 1947 – 4 November 2018) was a Spanish judge and engineer. After passing through the courts of Terrassa, Sant Boi de Llobregat and Badalona, since 2003 he was in charge of the Court of Instruction number 13 of Barcelona. He issued controversial orders of provisional detention against the squatting movement and anti-establishment groups.

== Career ==
He began his judicial career via public tendering in 1991, when he was 44 years old. On 17 May 1994, he was appointed magistrate. Until that moment, he was judge of first instance and instruction of the court number 3 of San Boi de Llobregat and then was assigned to the court of first instance number 5 of Tarrasa. At the end of the 1990s, he was a member of the electoral board of Barcelona. In 1997 he was transferred to Badalona and on 24 October 2000 he became the dean of the courts of Badalona, where he was the judge of first instance court number 5 and then number 4.

In 2003, he moved to court number 13 of Barcelona. In 2004, he carried out various cases against the squatting movement.

He instructed the case for an attack with incendiary devices at the police station on Carrer de Santst, and ordered the imprisonment in the Trinitat Vella prison of two young people aged 18 and 19 from L'Hospitalet de Llobregat. They were released 60 days later because there was no evidence to incriminate them. The trial declared them innocent and the State had to compensate them.

In June 2005, he ordered the imprisonment of three demonstrators of an anarchist solidarity march.

In 2014, a member of the Castellers de Barcelona was imprisoned preventively under Ramírez Sunyer's orders for allegedly participating in demonstrations in favor of Can Vies in May. He spent 24 days in prison until an acquittal was pronounced.

In September 2015, he opened proceedings against the general director of the Catalan police Albert Batlle for "failure to prosecute the offense" after jeers occurred during the singing of the Spanish national anthem on 30 May at Camp Nou.

Beginning in March 2017, Ramírez Sunyer instructed the "Cause of the 13th", an investigation derived from a complaint by Vox for the statements of former judge and former Senator Santiago Vidal on the preparations of the Government of Catalonia for the 2017 Catalan independence referendum. The first researchers, besides Vidal, were Carles Viver i Pi-Sunyer, director of the Institut d'Estudis per l'Autogovern and Josep Lluís Salvadó, Secretary of Finance of the Catalan Government. His investigation involved the registration of the National Theater of Catalonia, where the act of presentation of the Catalan Referendum Act of 4 July 2017 was held. He also made a statement to a dozen senior officials of the Catalan Government and officials, as well as business executives who competed to manufacture the ballot boxes for the referendum vote. In September 2017, Ramírez Sunyer stopped carrying the cause after being challenged because he was declared "contaminated" by Operation Anubis. He was replaced first by the judge of the Instructional Court 29 and, from 13 December onwards, by Jaime Conejo, formerly in the 16th court of Barcelona.

=== Operation Anubis ===
Under his orders, on 20 September 2017 the Civil Guard enacted Operation Anubis; in the Department of Economy, Welfare and Social Affairs, the Department of Government and Foreign Affairs, in the Open Administration of Catalonia, in the ICF and in the CTTI (Center for Telecommunications and Information Technologies of the Generalitat of Catalonia), 12 people were arrested. For this reason, the Catalan Government announced the filing of a complaint against Ramírez Sunyer and the Civil Guard.

== Honors ==
In 2016, he received one of the 235 medals of the Department of the Interior of the Generalitat of Catalonia on the Day of Esquadres.

== See also ==
- 2017–18 Spanish constitutional crisis
