= Carmen Lamela =

Spanish judge

Carmen Lamela Díaz
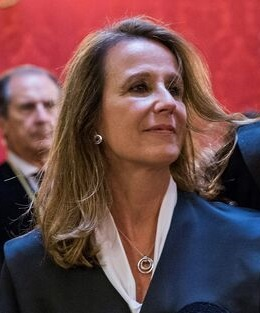
- Carmen Lamela in July 2018 while being appointed as magistrate of the Spanish Supreme Court

Magistrate for the Third Court of the Audiencia Nacional of Spain
- Incumbent
- Assumed office November 2015
- Preceded by: Javier Gómez Bermúdez

Personal details
- Born: 1961 (age 64–65)
- Education: Comillas Pontifical University

Carmen Lamela Díaz (born 1961) is a Spanish judge. Lamela serves as examining magistrate at the Third Court of the National Court of Spain. Her area of expertise is criminal law.

== Career ==
=== Previous experience ===
In 1984 Lamela graduated and received a law degree from Comillas Pontifical University (ICADE), and in 1986 she began working as a judge in Orihuela's trial court. In 1987 she was transferred to the trial court of Manzanares, Ciudad Real. One of the first cases she handled was the one involving the death of Mikel Lopetegui. Between 1989 y 1990 she was assigned to the trial court number 3 of Badalona. In 1990 Lamela was appointed magistrate for the Audiencia Provincial of Barcelona. In 1993 she moved to Madrid to work as magistrate at the trial court number 25. Four years later in 1997 she moved to section 16 and then to the criminal section 17 of the Audiencia Provincial of Madrid.

=== Audiencia Nacional of Spain (National Court) ===
In 2010 Lamela was one of the candidates to join the Audiencia Nacional of Spain, she was nominated along with magistrates Pablo Ruz and Carmen Rodríguez-Medel by the governing body of the Audiencia Nacional in the permanent committee of the General Council of the Judiciary to serve at trial court number 5 after the preliminary suspension of judge Baltasar Garzón.

In 2014 Joined the Audiencia Nacional, first serving in the criminal section and since November 2015 as examining magistrate at the third court of the National Court of Spain replacing Juan Pablo González. On 28 September Lamela became the sitting magistrate for the court after Javier Gómez Bermúdez renounced his post to work as a lawyer.

Lamela has managed various controversial court cases, like the one against Abengoa, or the trial against Bancaja.

Other notable cases:

- The operation Rimet about Sandro Rosell's alleged money laundering, ordering precautionary imprisonment for Mr. Rosell, acquitted and released two years later.
- Imprisonment order for eight Catalan government ministers for their alleged involvement in the independence vote on 1 October 2017.
- In October 2016, the trial concerning a bar brawl that involved two Civil Guard officers and local youths in the town of Alsasua in the Basque Country region, bringing the case from local jurisdiction to the National Court in Madrid for alleged relation of the defendants to terrorism; despite their conviction, they were acquitted of 'terrorism' charges in 2019.
- In October 2016, the trial case against thirteen rap singers from the group "La Insurgencia" under charges of "glorifying terrorism" through songs published at YouTube and Facebook.
- In April 2017, the case named Operation Tandem investigates police commissioners José Villarejo and Carlos Salamanca charged with been hired by a high-ranking officer of Equatorial Guinea to discredit Gabriel Mbaga Obiang Lima, son of president Obiang. On 5 November Lamela remanded both into custody under charges of organized crime, bribery and money laundering.
- In November 2017, she ordered that eight members of the deposed Catalan government following the Catalan declaration of independence, including the ex-vice-president Oriol Junqueras be remanded in custody without bail.
- In August 2018, she ordered that the suspect in the death of Nicky Verstappen be held without bail, pending handover to the Netherlands.

== Personal life ==
Lamela has a sister named María Luisa Lamela, that served as Comptroller General of the State Administration of Spain from 2016 until June 2018.

== Awards ==
- October 2016: Silver Cross of Merit of the Spanish Civil Guard.
- September 2017: Police Merit Medal bestowed by the Minister of the interior Juan Ignacio Zoido.
