= Josep Lluís Trapero Álvarez =

Mossos d'Esquadra Major

Major dels Mossos d'Esquadra Josep Lluís Trapero Álvarez
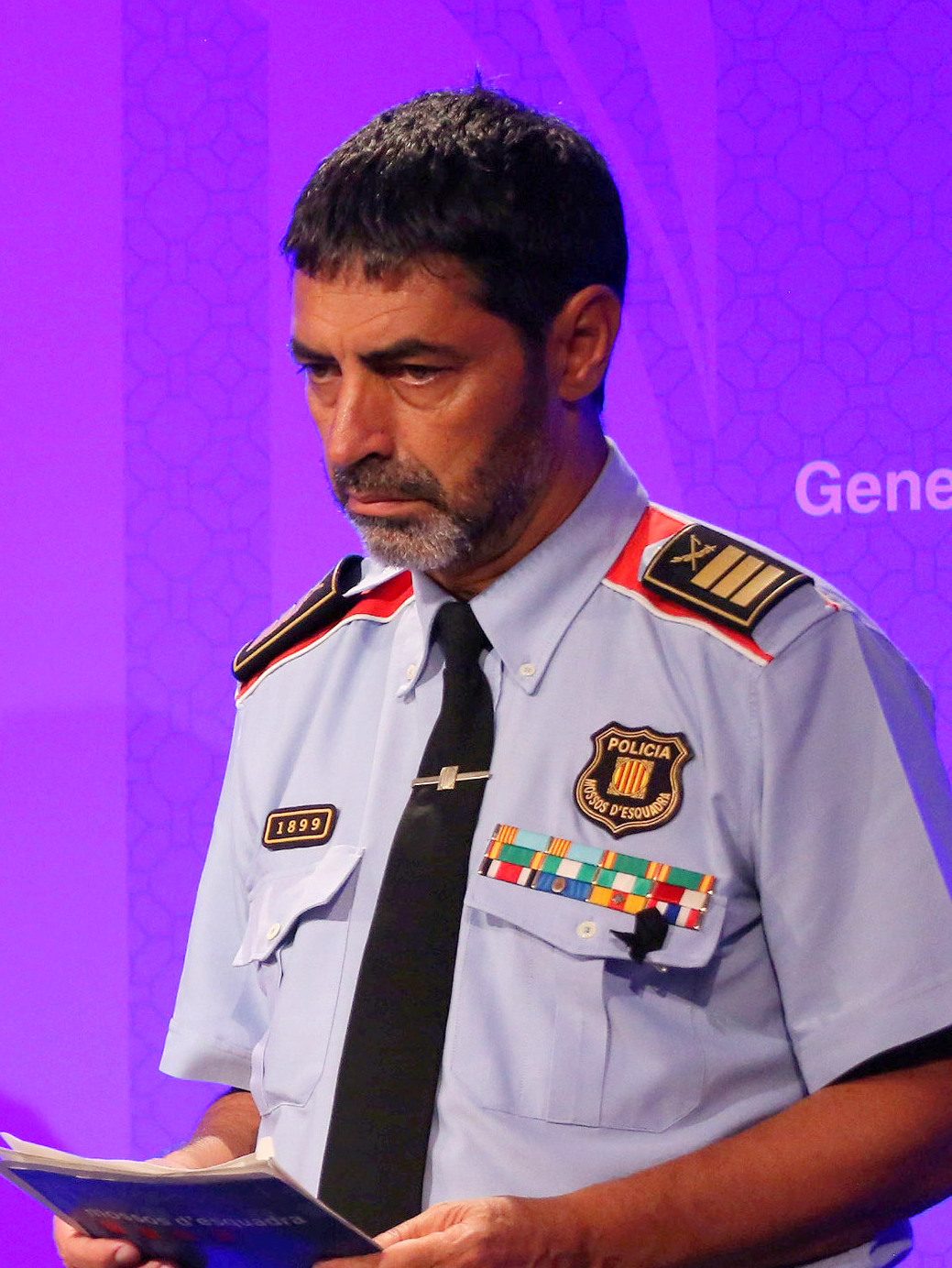
- Josep Lluís Trapero led the investigation and the press conferences of the 2017 Barcelona attacks.
- Born: 1965 (age 60–61); Badalona, Catalonia, Spain
- Education: Open University of Catalonia; Institut de Seguretat Pública de Catalunya (Public Safety Institute of Catalonia)
- Police career
- Allegiance: Catalonia
- Department: Mossos d'Esquadra
- Service years: 1990–2017, 2020-2022
- Rank: Major dels Mossos d'Esquadra (2017, 2020-2022); Comissari en cap dels Mossos d'Esquadra (2013)
- Awards: Two Mossos d'Esquadra bronze medals to the police merit Three Policía Nacional crosses to police merit with white badge Two Guardia Civil crosses of the order of merit with white badge

Josep Lluís Trapero Álvarez (born 1965) is the Major of the Mossos d'Esquadra, currently on leave to serve as the Police General Director of the Catalan Government.

On 28 October 2017, the Spanish government declared him removed from his post, after its invocation of Article 155 of the Spanish Constitution, suspending Catalonia's autonomy. In 2020, he was restored to his position of Major after being acquitted of wrongdoing by the Audiencia Nacional. Trapero started his career as an officer in 1990 and, after years of service, he was granted the position of Commissioner in 2013. In 2017, after 26 years of service, he achieved the rank of Major, succeeding Joan Unió.

== Biography ==
Josep Lluís Trapero was born in 1965 in Badalona in a humble family from Valladolid. During his childhood he lived in the working-class neighbourhood of La Guinardera in Santa Coloma de Gramenet, close to Barcelona. As a child he didn't want to be a police officer, he was more interested in animals and biology.

In 1989 he was admitted in the School of Public Security of Catalonia (Institut de Seguretat Pública de Catalunya) where he graduated the following year. In 2006 Trapero graduated in law from the Open University of Catalonia and later on obtained a postdegree in Direction and Management of Public Security. His fields of specialization are cybercrime, money laundering, and terrorism financing. In 2012 he travelled to an FBI academy in Quantico, United States, where he participated in the Latin American Law Enforcement Executive Development Seminar (LALEEDS).

As a Mosso d'Esquadra, Trapero has worked in the Basic Police Area in Girona and also in the Office of Complaints of Vielha. He also was a corporal in the Quatre Camins Prison. Later on, he was deployed in the Investigation Group in Blanes and Figueres, and afterwards he applied what he learnt in different regions of Catalonia. In 2008 he was designated as a Chief of the Division of Criminal Investigation (Divisió d'Investigació Criminal, CGIC). A year later he was promoted to Sub-Chief of the General Criminal Investigation Group (Comissaria General d'Investigació Criminal), and in 2012 he would be promoted again to lead the whole group. Just one year later he would be designated Commissioner of the Mossos d'Esquadra and in 2017 he was given the opportunity to get the position of Chief of police, which he accepted.

On 4 October 2017, after the Catalan independence referendum of 2017, Trapero was accused by Spanish prosecutors for alleged sedition. He allegedly refused to carry out judicial orders on 1 October 2017. In addition, he is accused of obstructing a police investigation on 20 September 2017. Sedition in Spain carries a maximum sentence for public officials of 15 years in prison. On 16 October 2017 a Spanish prosecutor asked for Josep Lluís Trapero to be jailed. Later that day, a judge would allow Trapero to remain free but withdrew his passport and ordered him to appear in court every two weeks. The court said that this could change if Trapero disobeys the conditions.

In April 2018, judge Carmen Lamela closed the instruction and ordered the prosecution of Trapero, Pere Soler and number two of Joaquim Forn, Cèsar Puig, as well as of the mayor Teresa Laplana, charged for sedition. Lamela defenses that Trapero, Soler and Puig were part of a criminal organization led by Carles Puigdemont.

In October 2020, he was acquitted by the Audiencia Nacional. Subsequently, on 12 November 2020, he was restored by the Catalan Minister of Interior Miquel Sàmper to his former post of Major of the Mossos d'Esquadra.

== See also ==
- Carles Puigdemont
- Guàrdia Urbana de Barcelona
- Joaquim Forn
