= Alsasua – Altsasu =

Altsasu/Alsasua Altsasu Alsasua
- Municipality
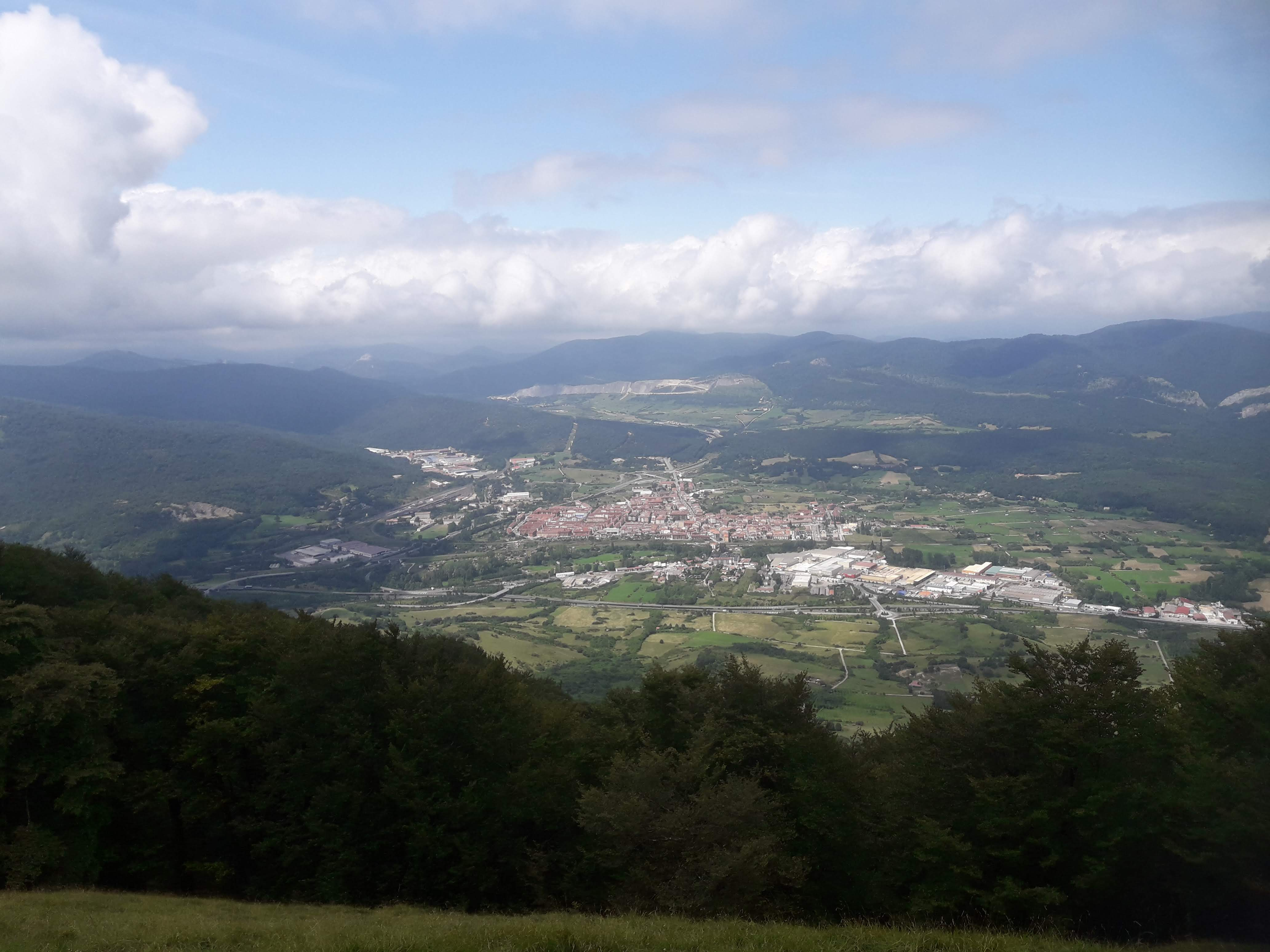
- Aerial view of Altsasu/Alsasua

- Flag Coat of arms

- Location of Altsasu/Alsasua within Navarre Location of Altsasu/Alsasuawithin Spain
- Coordinates: 42°53′43″N 2°10′8″W
- Country: Spain
- Autonomous community: Navarre
- Province: Navarre
- Comarca/Eskualdea: La Barranca/Sakana

Government
  - Alcalde (Mayor): Javier Ollo Martínez (Geroa Bai)

Area
  - Total: 26.72 km^{2} (10.32 sq mi)

Population (2025-01-01)
  - Total: 7,717
  - Density: 288.8/km^{2} (748.0/sq mi)
- (INE)
- Demonym: alsasuarra
- Time zone: UTC+1 (CET)
  - Summer (DST): UTC+2 (CEST)
- Postal code: 31800

Alsasua (in Spanish; Altsasu in Basque; official name: Altsasu/Alsasua) is a town located in the autonomous community of Navarre, northern Spain. Its population in 2017 was 7,419. The Battle of Alsasua took place here in 1834. 30 years later the town turned into a railway hub, transforming its demography, economy, and cultural landscape. In 2016, a fight erupting in a bar escalated into an Audiencia Nacional judicial case that stirred the town. The bus and coach building company Sunsundegui had its factory in the town and was a major local employer, but the company closed in 2025.

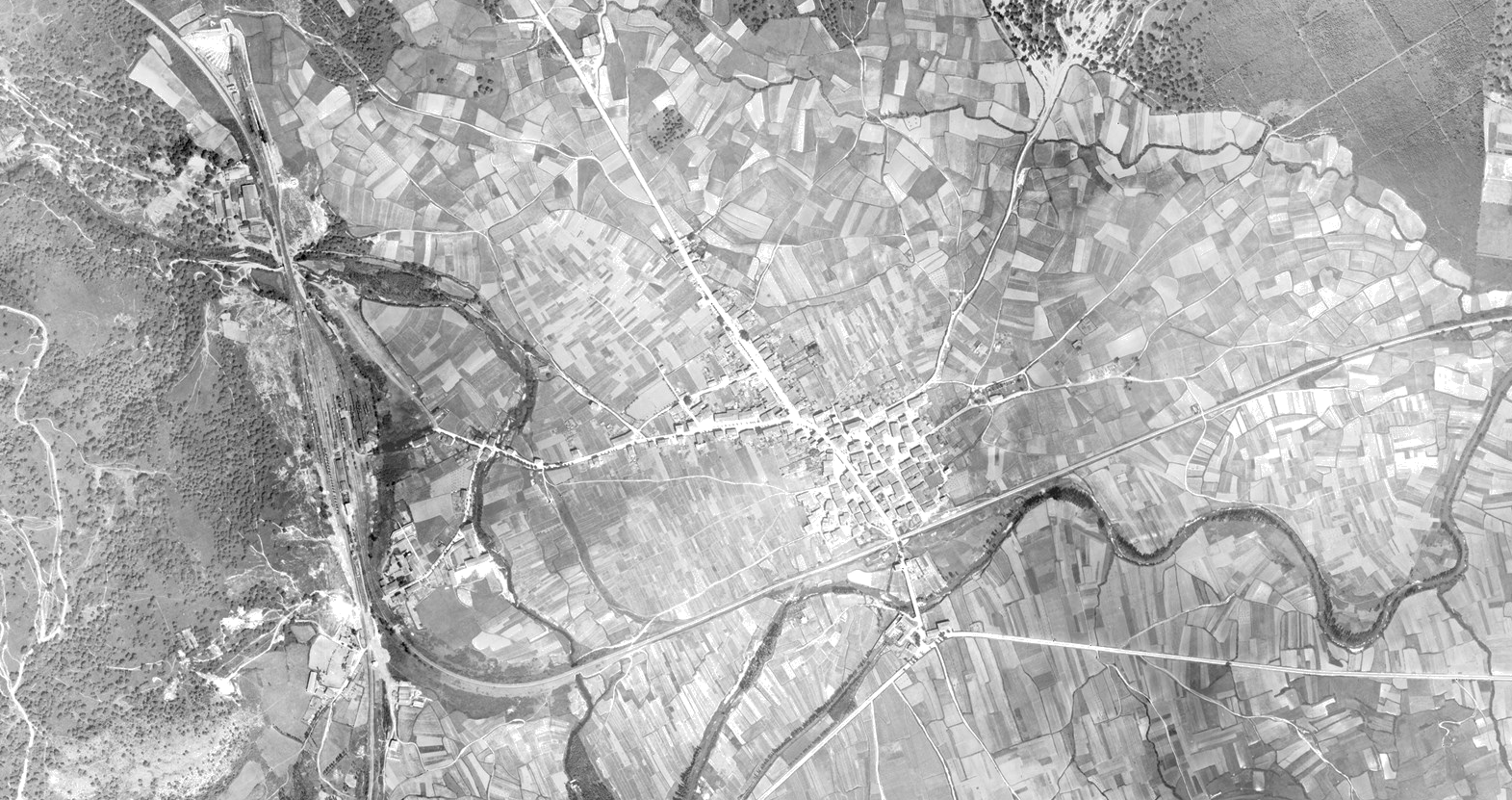
Alsasua in 1928.
