= Criminal Code (Spain) =

Law that codifies most criminal offences in Spain

Cortes Generales
- Enacted by: 5th Cortes Generales
- Enacted: 8 November 1995
- Royal assent: 23 November 1995
- Effective: 25 May 1996
- Status: In force

The Criminal Code is a law that codifies most criminal offences in Spain. The Code is established by an organic law, the Organic Law 10/1995, of 23 November, of the Criminal Code (Ley Orgánica 10/1995, de 23 de noviembre, del Código Penal). Section 149(6) of the Spanish Constitution establishes the sole jurisdiction of the Cortes Generales over criminal law in Spain.

The Criminal Code is structured through two books. The first book regulates general norms about criminal offenses and penalties and the second book regulates crimes and other dangerous situations, to which the code attributes penalties and security measures, respectively. The Criminal Code is a fundamental law of the Spanish criminal law, because it is a limit to the ius puniendi (or «right to punish») of the State.

The Code was enacted by the Spanish Parliament on 8 November 1995 and it was published in the Official State Gazette (BOE) on 23 November. The Code is in force since 25 May 1996. Since its publication, it has been modified on more than thirty occasions, the last time on 2 March 2019.

== Structure ==
The current Spanish Criminal Code is divided in two books, thirty-five titles, one hundred and nine chapters and more than six hundred articles.

- PRELIMINARY TITLE. On penal guarantees and on the application of the Criminal Law.
- BOOK I. General provisions on felonies and misdemeanours, the persons responsible, the penalties, security measures and other consequences of criminal offences.
  - TITLE I. On felonies and misdemeanours.
  - TITLE II. On persons criminally responsible for felonies and misdemeanours.
  - TITLE III. On penalties.
  - TITLE IV. On security measures.
  - TITLE V. On civil liability arising from the felonies and misdemeanours and costs.
  - TITLE VI. On ancillary consequences.
  - TITLE VII. On expiration of criminal accountability and its effects.
- BOOK II. On felonies and their penalties.
  - TITLE I. On unlawful killing and its forms.
  - TITLE II. On abortion.
  - TITLE III. On bodily harm.
  - TITLE IV. On injuries to the foetus.
  - TITLE V. Felonies related to genetic engineering.
  - TITLE VI. Felonies against freedom.
  - TITLE VII. On torture and other felonies against moral integrity.
  - TITLE VII BIS. On trafficking in human beings.
  - TITLE VIII. Felonies against sexual freedom and indemnity.
  - TITLE IX. On failure in the duty to assist.
  - TITLE X. Felonies against privacy, the right to personal dignity and the inviolability of the dwelling.
  - TITLE XI. Felonies against honour.
  - TITLE XII. Felonies against relatives.
  - TITLE XIII. Felonies against property and against social-economic order.
  - TITLE XIII BIS. On felonies of illegal financing of political parties.
  - TITLE XIV. On felonies against the Exchequer and the Social Security.
  - TITLE XV. On felonies against the rights of workers.
  - TITLE XV BIS. Offences against the rights of aliens
  - TITLE XVI. On felonies concerning organisation of the territory and town planning, protection of the historic heritage and the environment.
  - TITLE XVII. On felonies against collective safety.
  - TITLE XVIII. On forgery.
  - TITLE XIX. On felonies against the public administration.
  - TITLE XX. On felonies against the Judicial Power.
  - TITLE XXI. On felonies against the Constitution.
  - TITLE XXII. Felonies against public order.
  - TITLE XXIII. On felonies of treason and against the peace or independence of the State and those referring to National Defence.
  - TITLE XXIV. Crimes against the International Community.

Before 2015, a third title existed, referring to misdemeanours. However, this title was repealed in the 2015 reform and some of the misdemeanours were transformed into minor criminal offences and others into administrative offences.

== History and evolution ==
The current Criminal Code dates back to 1995, however, since the first code in 1822, several other codes have been approved.

Evolution of the Spanish criminal codes, 1822 – present
Act	Highlights
Criminal Code of 1822	The history of the Penal Code of 1822 was very brief. It was written during the Liberal Triennium, based on the ideas of the Enlightenment. It consisted of a preliminary title and two parts, the first dedicated to "Felonies against Society" and the second to "Felonies against Individuals". It established the principle of legality of crimes and penalties, and in many respects it has been followed by subsequent codes such as the legal definition of crime, catalogs of mitigating and aggravating circumstances, or civil liability. The Code included the punishment of "guilt" -or wrongful crimes- adhered to the principle of exceptionality or specificity on a case-by-case basis, a criterion subsequently abandoned until the 1995 Code.
Criminal Code of 1848	After 1823, King Ferdinand VII restores absolutism and abolished the 1822 Criminal Code. With the restored absolutism, the criminal law of the Ancien Regime is restored, which only disappears definitively when, after some failed projects, the General Codifying Commission (created in 1843) draws up the project that has just become the Penal Code of 1848, called the Pacheco Code due to the influence of Joaquin Francisco Pacheco. It was a liberal and authoritarian text. It accepted the tripartite classification of criminal offenses and regarding guilt is based on the principle of versari in re illicita or "responsibility for the result".
Criminal Code of 1850	The reform of 1850 supposed a greater hardening, being punished in general the conspiracy and proposition to commit a crime and disregarding the principle of the legality of penalties, which constitutes a unique case in Spanish codification.
Criminal Code of 1870	The Code of 1870 tries to adapt the text of 1850 to the requirements of the Constitution of 1869, which emerged from the Glorious Revolution of 1868. Although it was processed as a matter of urgency and entered into force provisionally, while the Cortes produced a definitive text, it actually had a long validity that, except for the interval of the 1928 Code, lasted until the 1932 Code.
Criminal Code of 1928	The Criminal Code of 1928 was promulgated under the Primo de Rivera dictatorship. Departing from the classical and liberal line, it incorporates the principle of social defense, which translates into the introduction of "dualism", which places security measures (first introduced) alongside penalties. The new code was criticized from its inception for the rigor in the punishment of the prisoner and the frequency with which the death penalty was imposed. In the special part, defamation, blackmail and usury are typified, among other new figures.
Criminal Code of 1932	Proclaimed the Second Republic, the provisional Government immediately repealed the Criminal Code of 1928, giving force again to the Code of 1870. Taking this as a starting point, the 1932 Code was subsequently elaborated, in whose preparation relevant criminalists such as Luis Jiménez de Asúa and Antón Oneca. The tripartite classification is replaced by the bipartite. The humanitarian orientation of the new text is manifested in the suppression of the death penalty, in the reduction of the number of aggravating circumstances, and in institutions such as conditional sentence and probation. The code was complemented by the Vagrants and Raiders Act (1933) which provided for certain dangerous states with both post-criminal and pre-criminal security measures.
Criminal Code of 1944	The Civil War (1936–1939) gave rise to a special and authoritative criminal legislation in accordance with the new conditions, and the reform of the 1932 Code was delayed until 1944, promulgating a new code in accordance with the booming authoritarian criminal law in Europe, restoring the death penalty, with more severe penalties and greater protection for the State, the family and social interests. However, the principle of legality and prohibition of analogy is maintained. This Code was in force until 1995, already in democracy, but with several reforms in 1963, 1973, 1983, 1985 and 1989. However, the most relevant reforms were that of 1983, 1985 and 1989. In 1983, the new reform introduces the principle of guilt against that of strict liability, updates the general part in matters such as error or crime continued and substantially modifies the special part, incorporating numerous technical improvements. In 1985, new crimes against the Public Treasury or against the Social Security were introduced; decriminalization of some cases of abortion, combining the term system and the indications system. In 1988, it was modified again to introduce crimes related to drug trafficking and the replacement of the crime of public scandal by those of exhibitionism and sexual provocation. In 1989 the Code was updated by reforming Book III in accordance with the principle of minimum intervention, also modifying the crime of injuries, felonies against sexual freedom, traffic crimes, and introducing new types such as crime habitual mistreatment, non-payment of pensions or exploitation of minors in begging.
Criminal Code of 1995	It is the current version of the Criminal Code. It was passed in 1995 to established a new and fully democratic criminal code in accordance with the Social and Democratic State, subject to the rule of law. Originally composed of three books, since 2015 it only has two. The current Code is complemented by several other penal laws: Smuggling Suppression Organic Act; Air Navigation Criminal and Procedural Act; Military Penal Code; Criminal Procedural Organic Act; Organic Act regulating the criminal responsibility of minors; Organic Law regulating the "Habeas Corpus" procedure; Crime Victims Statute Act; Organic Law for the protection of witnesses and experts in criminal cases; Law on aid and assistance to victims of violent crimes and against sexual freedom; Integral Protection Measures against Gender Violence Organic Act; Organic Law of Cooperation with the International Criminal Court; Mutual recognition law of criminal decisions in the European Union; Organic Law on the exchange of information on criminal records in the European Union; Law establishing rules for the exercise of the pardon grace; Amnesty Act; Military Jurisdiction Organic Act; Military Procedural Organic Act; Terrorist Financing Prevention Act; Act for the prevention of money laundering and terrorist financing

== See also ==
- Spanish Constitution of 1978
- Civil Code of Spain
