= Eduardo Torres-Dulce =

Spanish prosecutor, professor of Criminal Law and film critic

The Most Excellent Eduardo Torres-Dulce OSRP
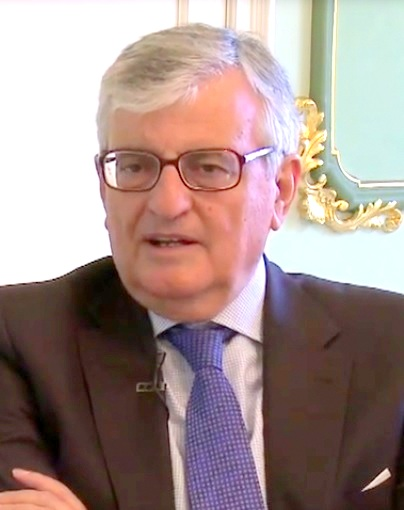

Prosecutor General of the State
- In office 30 December 2011 – 18 December 2014
- Preceded by: Cándido Conde-Pumpido
- Succeeded by: Consuelo Madrigal

Personal details
- Born: 14 May 1950 (age 76) Madrid, Spain
- Education: Complutense University of Madrid
- Occupation: Prosecutor, academic, film critic and writer

Eduardo Torres-Dulce Lifante (born 14 May 1950) is a Spanish prosecutor, professor of Criminal Law and a film critic. He was, from December 2011 to December 2014, Prosecutor General of the State. He has now returned to his position as Prosecutor at the Constitutional Court.

== Biography ==
Law degree from the Complutense University of Madrid, his career as a prosecutor has been developed in Seville, Guadalajara and Madrid. In 1996 he was promoted to the category of Fiscal de Sala and has been, since then, among other charges, Prosecutor of the Supreme Court of Spain, Chief of the Criminal Section, Member of the Fiscal Council and Prosecutor of the Prosecution before the Constitutional Court of Spain. He is the son of Eduardo Torres-Dulce y Ruíz, who was a magistrate of the Supreme Court. His uncle, Antonio Torres-Dulce y Ruíz, was president of the Public Order Court during the dictatorship.

As a professor, he has taught, among others, at the CEU Luis Vives, at the Institute of Business and Criminal Procedural Practice at the School of Legal Practice of ICADE, at the Practicum Course in the Bachelor's Degree at the Faculty of Law of the Autonomous University of Madrid, in the Faculty of Insurance Sciences of the Pontifical University of Salamanca and the Center for Legal Studies.

As a prosecutor of the Constitutional Court, specializing in labor issues, was splashed by a scandal when he served as chairman of the Appeals Committee of the Spanish Football Federation. The controversy broke out when, in a controversial decision, lifted the suspension of a match - imposed in the first instance by the Competition Committee - the player Hugo Sanchez of Real Madrid. His past as a Madridista since he was thirteen years old and the harsh criticism received forced him to submit his irrevocable resignation on 26 February 1988.

As author of specialized publications in Law, he has participated, among others, in the elaboration of the Penal Code commented, in the Organic Law of the Constitutional Court, in a selection of the jurisprudence of the Constitutional Court's Autos, in a few Comments to the Statute of the Autonomy of Madrid, etc.

== Prosecutor General of the State ==
He was named Prosecutor General on 27 December 2011 by Mariano Rajoy's Government, and took office on 30th.

On 18 December 2014 he resigned as Prosecutor General of the State alleging personal motives, although some sources pointed to discrepancies with the Spanish government to enter into the independence of the fiscal ministry. The last episode at the head of the Prosecutor General was the complaint filed against Artur Mas, Joana Ortega and Irene Rigau for the Catalan self-determination referendum of 9 November, while the Superior Prosecutor of Catalonia, José María Romero de Tejada, as well as the rest of Catalan prosecutors they did not see inculpatory indications.

In August 2015, the Spanish government authorizes the former general prosecutor of the State to join the Garrigues Advocats office, without respecting the two-year period of incompatibilities contemplated by the law after the termination of high positions.

== Film critic and screenwriter ==
As a film critic, he participated in the Midnight Cowboys radio program (esRadio). Besides being the author of three books on cinema, he has collaborated in magazines and newspapers such as Nuestro Tiempo, Nueva Lente, Contracampo, Expansión, Fuera de serie, El Semanal, Telva and La Clave.

He was a member of the Editorial Board of Nickel Odeon magazine and the TVE program ¡Qué grande es el cine!, directed by José Luis Garci, who premiered the film Holmes & Watson. Madrid Days in 2012, with a script from both.

He is the author, among others, of the books Weapons, Women and Swiss Watches, Riders in the Sky, The Wages of Fear and The Difficult Loves. 1930-1960.

Torres-Dulce was co-screenwriter, along with José Luis Garci, of the film Holmes & Watson. Madrid Days, released in 2012 and inspired by the novels of the Scottish writer Arthur Conan Doyle. He has also collaborated with the ECAM (School of Cinema and Audiovisuals of the Community of Madrid) giving seminars on silent film, within the subject of History of Cinema directed by Carlos F. Heredero. He was a film critic of the magazine "Telva".

== Honors ==
- Great Cross of the Order of St. Raymond of Peñafort

== See also ==
- Judiciary of Spain
