= Inmaculada Montalbán =

Spanish judge (born 1959)

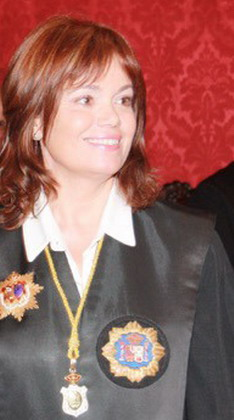

Vicepresident of the Constitutional Court of Spain
- Incumbent
- Assumed office 12 January 2023
- President: Cándido Conde-Pumpido
- Preceded by: Juan Antonio Xiol Ríos

Judge of the Constitutional Court of Spain
- Incumbent
- Assumed office 18 November 2021
- Appointed by: Congress of Deputies

Vocal of the General Council of the Judiciary
- In office 23 September 2008 – December 2013

Personal details
- Born: 1959 (age 66–67) Iznalloz, Andalusia, Spain
- Education: University of Granada

Inmaculada Montalbán Huertas (born 1959) is a Spanish judge who is expert in gender-based violence. She has been judge of the Constitutional Court of Spain since 2021 and its vicepresident since 2023. Montalbán previously served at the General Council of the Judiciary and the High Court of Justice of Andalusia, Ceuta and Melilla.

She is regarded as a pioneer in the study and analysis of the gender perspective as a criterion for interpreting legislation.

== Early life and education ==
Montalbán was born in 1959 in the village of Iznalloz, Province of Granada, Andalusia, Spain. She obtained a law degree from the University of Granada and joined the judiciary in 1985 after passing the competitive examination, having been posted to various courts across the country.

== Career ==
Her first postings as a judge were in Torrevieja and Almería. Montalbán was subsequently posted to the Provincial Court of Valencia between 1989 and 1991, Investigating Court No. 7 in Granada and the High Court of Justice of Andalusia, Ceuta and Melilla, until September 2008.

She has worked with the Spanish Agency for International Development Cooperation and the Government Delegation for Gender Violence and is one of Spain’s most internationally recognised legal experts on gender-based violence. Montalbán is a member of the Judges for Democracy association and served as its spokesperson between 2004 and 2006.

In September 2008 Montalbán became the first Andalusian woman member of the General Council of the Judiciary on the proposal of the PSOE. Since 2002, she had been a member of the CGPJ’s Committee of Experts on Domestic Violence. Montalbán presided its Observatory on Gender-Based Violence. She served at the General Council until 2013.

Ruling PSOE proposed Montalbán as judge of the Constitutional Court of Spain in October 2022 as part of an agreement with the People’s Party to renew various state bodies, including four vacancies on the Constitutional Court. On 11 November 2022 the Congress of Deputies approved her nomination. Montalbán was sworn in on 18 November 2021 before the King Felipe VI. On 12 January 2023 she became its vicepresident. She has been seen as a judge who is very much in line with its president Cándido Conde-Pumpido.

In March 2022, Montalbán dismissed the application for amparo lodged by Catalan politician Oriol Junqueras against his conviction for rebellion and sedition after the Catalan declaration of independence. She was the judge hearing the appeals for constitutional protection lodged by some of those convicted in the ERE corruption case of the Andalusian PSOE. Montalbán argued in favour of striking out the offence of embezzlement, taking the view that, just as the offence of prevarication had been struck out of the case, so too should the offence of embezzlement be struck out, as they are related offences.

== Works ==
- Gender Perspective: a criterion for international and constitutional interpretation

== Honors ==
- Medal of Andalusia (2012)
