= Consuelo Madrigal =

Spanish prosecutor

The Most Excellent Consuelo Madrigal OSRP
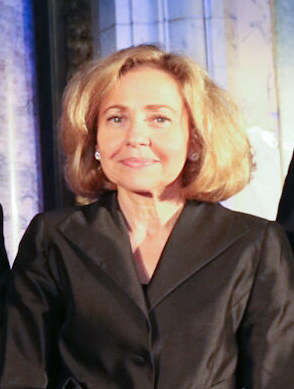

Prosecutor General of the State
- In office January 10, 2015 – November 4, 2016
- Preceded by: Eduardo Torres-Dulce
- Succeeded by: José Manuel Maza

Personal details
- Born: November 2, 1956 (age 69) Segovia, Spain
- Education: Complutense University of Madrid

Consuelo Madrigal Martínez-Pereda is a Spanish prosecutor who currently serves as prosecutor in the Spanish Supreme Court. Previously, she served as Prosecutor General of the State between January 2015 and November 2016, being the first woman to hold this position.

== Career path ==
Madrigal studied law at the Complutense University of Madrid and graduated in 1978. She became a prosecutor in 1980 and worked at the Prosecutor's Offices of Santa Cruz de Tenerife, Palencia, Madrid and in the Court of Auditors.

Madrigal served as Technical Secretary-General of the Prosecutor General Office during the tenure of prosecutor general Carlos Granados. She also served as the Prosecutor of the Criminal Chamber of the Supreme Court until 2008, when she was appointed as Prosecutor for Minors Affairs in the tenure of Prosecutor general Cándido Conde-Pumpido.

After the resignation of Prosecutor General Eduardo Torres-Dulce in December 2014, Madrigal was nominated as his replacement. On 13 January 2015, she assumed office and became the first female prosecutor general of Spain.

In September 2016, at the opening of the legal year, she devoted part of her speech to the fight against corruption and to denounce "the total disregard for the constitutional order" demonstrated by the pro-independence sectors in the autonomous community of Catalonia. Madrigal was dismissed on 4 November 2016 and José Manuel Maza took her position.

After that, she returned to her ordinary position within the Prosecution Ministry as Supreme Court' prosecutor. She is one of the Supreme Court's prosecutors responsible for the trial of Catalan independence leaders.

== Honors ==
- Great Cross of the Order of St. Raymond of Peñafort

== See also ==
- Judiciary of Spain
