= Ibero-American Association of Public Prosecutors =

Nonprofit organization

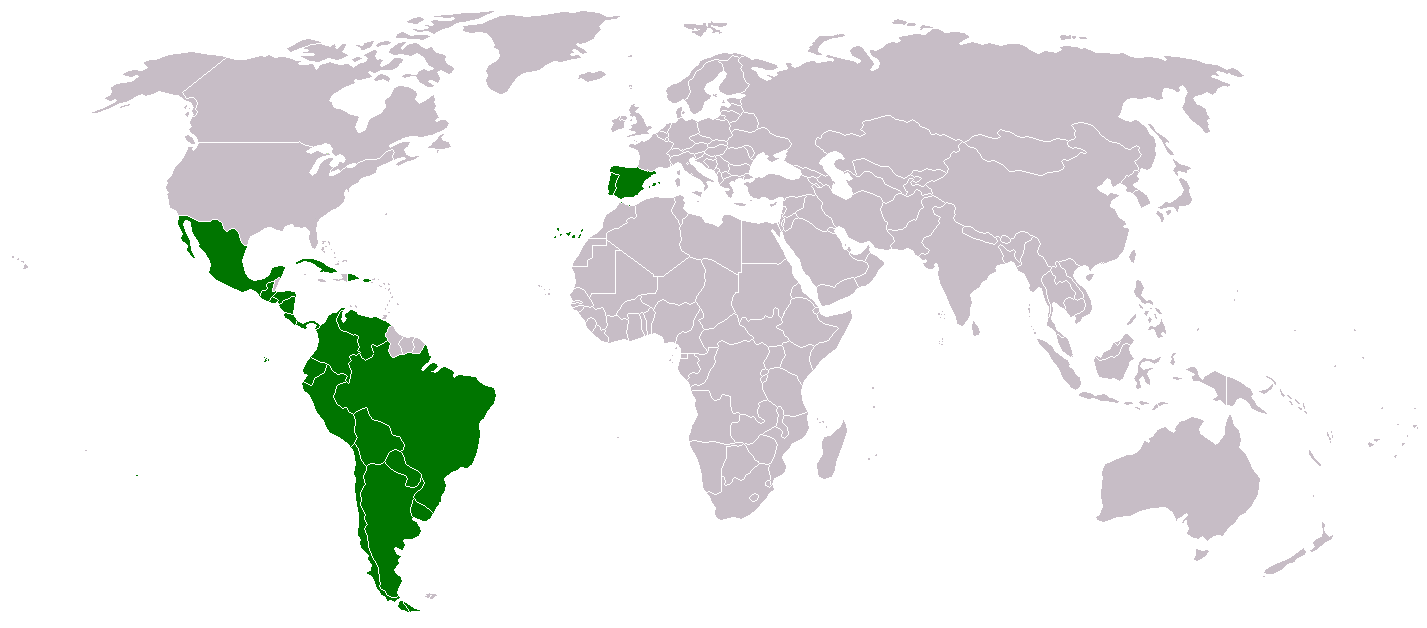
Iberoamérica

The Ibero-American Association of Public Prosecutors is composed of 21 countries and is aimed at closer ties of cooperation, solidarity, and professional enrichment between Ibero-American prosecutors.

== History ==
The AIAMP is a nonprofit entity, which integrates the Public Prosecutors of Latin America. It was founded in the Federative Republic of Brazil in 1954, as American Association of Public Prosecutors, later, with the addition of Spain and Portugal, was renamed the Ibero-American Association of Public Prosecutors, AIAMP. Currently make up 21 General Prosecutors of Latin America, which are governed by the statutes of the Association were approved at the XV General Assembly developed in October 2007 in Madrid, Spain.

The countries that make up the AIAMP are: Argentina, Bolivia, Brazil, Colombia, Costa Rica, Chile, Cuba, Ecuador, El Salvador, Spain, Guatemala, Honduras, Nicaragua, Mexico, Panama, Paraguay, Peru, Portugal, Dominican Republic, Uruguay and Venezuela.

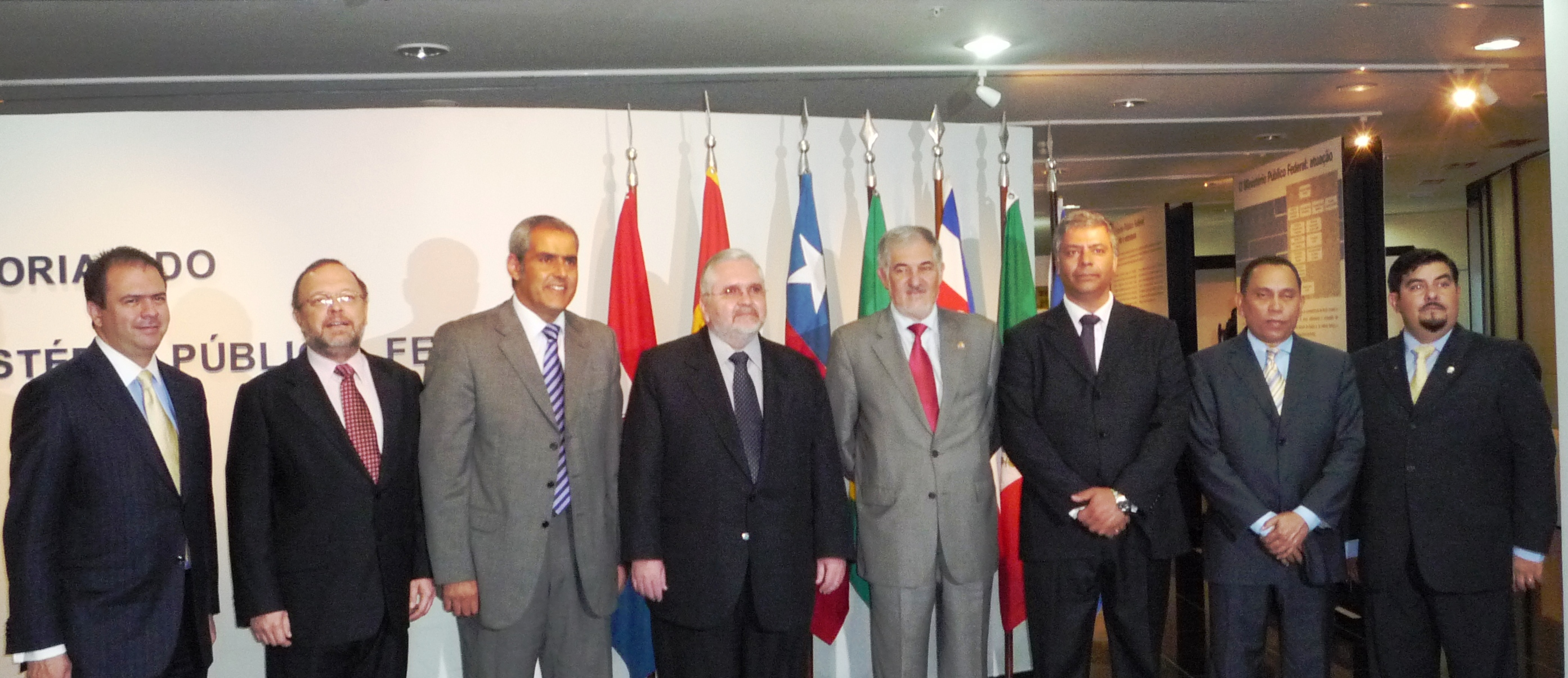
Brasília 2010

== Objectives and tasks ==
Among its objectives and functions is to strengthen ties of cooperation, solidarity and mutual enrichment among professional Prosecutors members of this organization, as well as provide for the establishment of common strategies to tackle the fundamental problems concerning the institution, understanding that his development and strengthening is a precondition for the effective protection of the rights of individuals and the effectiveness of the principles and institutions of the rule of law.

It also aims to facilitate linkages and communication with the public prosecutors who are not members of the Association, in order to contribute to institutional strengthening within their respective domestic legal and political

== Activities ==
Since its inception have made 20 General Ordinary Assembly and various workshops and seminars in whose encounters have been reached important conclusions such as supporting the establishment of an adversarial system in criminal proceedings and primarily directing their efforts against organized crime and the protection of victims and witnesses.

The last assembly was held in Panama from 26 to 28 November 2012.6

In this sense, the document highlights the Santiago Guidelines ( "Santiago's Guide on Victims and Witness Protection") suggests that collects and appropriate standards of care and protection that must be afforded to victims and witnesses of criminal proceedings by prosecutors and also by other entities in its endeavor to engage with these to the litigants proceedings. The Santiago Guidelines were promulgated and accepted by all members AIAMP in the XVI General Assembly developed in July 2008 in Punta Cana, Dominican Republic, and currently governed by an oversight plan on its implementation among members. This document was prepared by two commissions of experts composed of prosecutors specialized of AIAMP members, who made their contributions to the preparation of this material.

Along the same lines and focused on improving the prosecution of crimes related to human trafficking, AIAMP members in December 2008 signed the Declaration of the American Association of Public Prosecutors against Trafficking in Human Beings which seeks to engage the support in the investigation and punishment of this crime, through a commitment to enhance cooperation enters the public ministries of the region that will directly benefit these victims, supported by international criminal cooperation, criminal investigation, and assistance.

Another project featured on this forum is called AIAMP sheets, virtual platform that contains useful information and knowledge necessary for prosecutors in Latin America, with details of the procedures used in each country for various investigative actions. This platform was designed so that its contents be upgradeable over time, so that there is documentation that the most appropriate offer.

== Organization and management ==
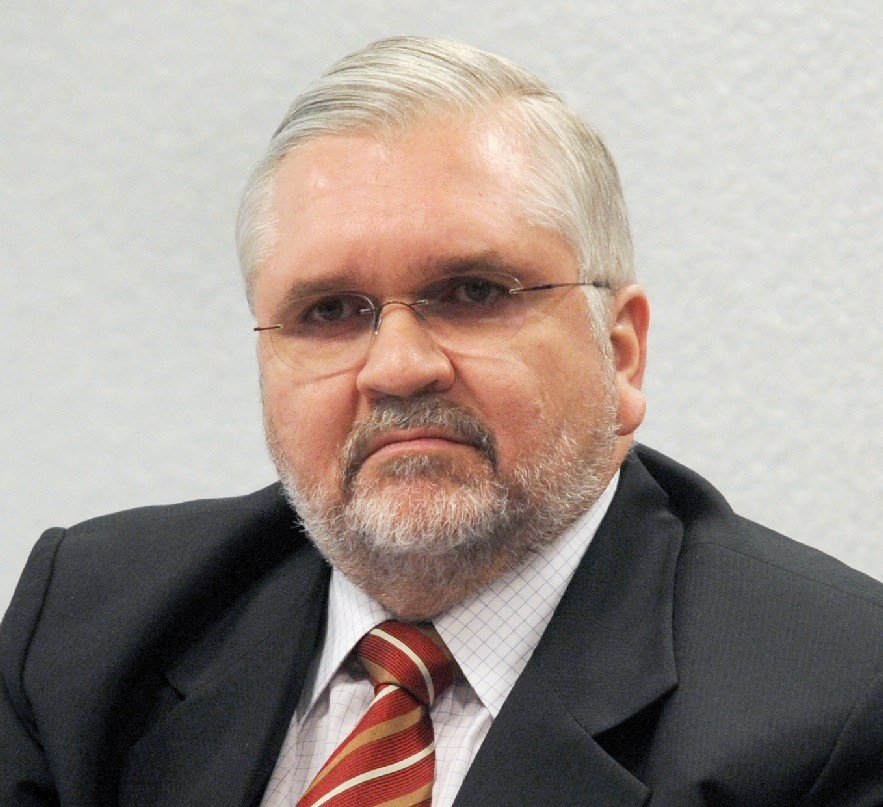
Roberto Gurgel, Procurador Geral da República de Brasil, President of AIAMP 2011–2013.

The AIAMP consists of a governing body headed by a presidency that was exercised by the Attorney General of Spain through its Attorney General, Cándido Conde-Pumpido Tourón, from 2007 to 2011. This appointment was made unanimously on October 23, 2007, on the occasion of the XV General Assembly AIAMP, held in Madrid, Spain, and later ratified by the members for a new term in November 2009 at the XVII General Assembly held in the city of La Antigua, Guatemala.

The Predecessor as President Conde-Pumpido was D. Guillermo Piedrabuena Richard, National Fiscal of Chile (2006–2007). The two previous presidents were D. German Oscar Latorre Cañete, Attorney General of the Republic of Paraguay (2004–2005) and D. Luis Camilo Osorio Isaza, Attorney General of the Republic of Colombia (2003–2004).

The next President was D. Roberto Gurgel, Attorney-Geral de Brasil, elected in December 2011, in the XIX Assembly in Brasília. According to the statutes governing the AIAMP, the governing body is an executive committee which is composed of four Regional Vice Presidents, General Secretary Permanent, the Presidency and the American Institute of Public Prosecutors, IIMP. The Ibero-American Institute of Public Prosecutors' Offices was created on November 24, 1998, at the Ordinary General Assembly of the Inter-American Association of Public Prosecutors' Offices held in Brasília, Federative Republic of Brazil.

Today the President is Rodrigo Janot, Procurador-Geral de Brasil, elected in 2013, on the occasion of the XXI Assembly held in Ecuador.

== Permanent Secretariat ==
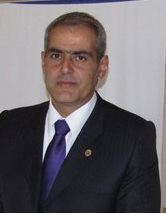
Sabas Chahuán, Attorney general of Chile

The Permanent Secretariat is the body of legal technical support of the Association and within its functions is to exercise the mandates of the President, Service History and institutional continuity, including the administration of the website, and encourage and make preliminary studies necessary for the promotion of projects of interest to the members of the Association. The Permanent Secretariat has been exercised from 2007 to 2012 by the Public Ministry of Chile.

Having held the XV General Assembly AIAMP (Madrid, Spain), and within the new statutory framework, the members agreed to establish the Permanent General Secretariat based in the prosecution of Chile, whose head would be appointed by the Attorney General of that country.

On January 29, 2008, the Attorney General of Chile, Sabas Chahuán complied with the provisions of Article 19 and 22 of the new regulations governing the Association and fixing to Chile to host the Permanent Secretariat AIAMP.

The appointment of the Secretary General of the AIAMP the lawyer Jorge Chocair Lahsen, Director of the Special Unit for International Cooperation and Public Ministry and Extraditions from Chile.

From April 2013, the Secretary General shall be responsible to Costa Rica.

== IberRED ==
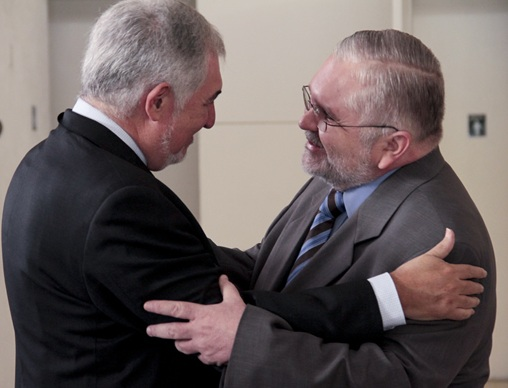
Conde-Pumpido and Gurgel in Brasília

The Ibero-American Network for International Legal Cooperation (IberRed) is a cooperation tool, for both civil and criminal matters, at the disposal of judicial operators from 22 Ibero-American countries) including Spain and Portugal) and the Supreme Court of Puerto Rico.

The IberRed benefits over 500 million citizens and has two official languages: Spanish and Portuguese.

The IberRed was created on October 30, 2004, in Cartagenade Indias, Colombia, with the approval of the Conference of the Ministers of Justice of the Ibero-American Countries (COMJIB), the Cumbre Judicial Iberoamericana (Ibero-American Judicial Summit) (CJI) and the Asociación Iberoamericana de Ministerios Públicos (Ibero-American Association of Public Prosecutors) (AIAMP).

The Network is composed of:

a) General Secretariat: this is a permanent Secretariat run by the General Secretariat of the Conference of the Ministers of Justice of Ibero-American Countries (COMJIB), based in Madrid.

b) Members: Contact Points, Central Authorities, Any other judicial or administrative authority with responsibility for judicial cooperation in civil and criminal matters whose Network membership is considered appropriate by existing IberRed members.

The Contact Points are persons appointed by the Ministers of Justice, the Public Prosecutors' or Attorneys General's Offices and by other judicial bodies in the Ibero-American countries.

These appointed persons (Judges, Public Prosecutors and Civil Servants from the Ministries of Justice) will carry out the Network's operational actions.

The Central Authorities are those established by instruments of International Law to which the countries of the Ibero-American community are parties, or by rules of Internal Law concerning judicial cooperation in civil and criminal matters.

IberRed works in coordination with the Conference of Ministers of Justice of the Ibero-American Countries (COMJIB), and the Ibero-American Association of Public Prosecutors (AIAMP), which forms a part of the network; thus, all international legal cooperation undertaken within the scope of IberRed will be addressed jointly.

== Seminar Victims and Witnesses Protection held in Madrid ==
In the seminar, "Victims and Witnesses Protection. The role of the Fiscal Ministry" held in Madrid in October 2007, within the framework of the XV General Assembly of the Iberoamerican Association of Public Prosecutors Offices, it was agreed to create two working commissions: one to address victim's protections, and the second to face witness's protection.

== XVI General Assembly of the AIAMP, held in Dominican Republic in June 2008 ==
In the XVI General Assembly of the AIAMP, held in Dominican Republic in June 2008, the document presented by the experts group was unanimously approved and denominated "Santiago's Guide on Victims and Witness Protection"

In the same XVI General Assembly of IAMP was also approved by the same Assembly to incorporate the "Brazilian Rules on Justice Access to Persons in Vulnerable Conditions", which are fully applicable in cases of human trafficking victims.

== XVII Assembly, Antigua, Guatemala, 2009 ==
On November 23 and 24, 2009 was held in Antigua, Guatemala, the XVII Assembly of the Ibero-American Association of Public Prosecutors (AIAMP), organized by the Prosecutor General of Guatemala José Amilcar Velasquez Zarate. The President of Guatemala, Alvaro Colom, inaugurated the meeting which took place at the headquarters of the Spanish Agency of International Cooperation for Development (AECID) and in which they discussed issues of common interest such as monitoring of protection Santiago Guides of victims and witnesses, and presented AIAMP chips, containing a summary of the procedural law of each of the Latin American countries in an automated records system and electronic format.

In voting for the election of officers of the Steering Committee of the Association resulting reelected unanimously as president for the next two years Spain's Attorney General, Cándido Conde-Pumpido Tourón. In turn and were unanimously appointed the following vice presidents: Vice President for Central America, the Attorney General of Guatemala, Jose Amilcar Velasquez Zarate, Vice President for South America, the Attorney General of Peru, Gladis Echaiz, and vice president for North America and Caribbean, Attorney General of the Dominican Republic, Radhames Jimenez Peña. It was also re-elected as President of the American Institute of Public Prosecutors Attorney General of Venezuela, Dona Luisa Ortega

== XVIII General Assembly of the AIAMP, held in Lima in November 2010 ==
Peruvian president Alan Garcia addressed the opening of the 18th Extraordinary General Assembly of the Ibero-American Association of Public Prosecutors during a ceremony held at the Golden Hall of the Government Palace in Lima.

Participants in this event included the AIAMP President, Spain's Attorney General Cándido Conde-Pumpido Touron; AIAMP Vicepresident, Prosecutor General Gladys Echaiz and Secretary General of the Association, Jorge Chocair. The ceremony was also attended by the Dominican Prosecutor General and AIAMP Vice-president for Central America, Rahdamez Jimenez, among others.

The 18th General Assembly will convene on November 2–5 in Lima and will comprise representatives of Public Ministries of Argentina, Bolivia, Brazil, Colombia, Chile, Costa Rica, Cuba, Ecuador and El Salvador.

It will also bring together prosecutors and representatives of Guatemala, Honduras, México, Nicaragua, Panama, Paraguay, Portugal, Dominican Republic, Uruguay, Venezuela, United States and Korea. The AIAMP is an entity composed by Public Ministries of Ibero-American. Founded in Brazil in 1954, AIAMP is an entity composed of Public Ministries belonging to 21 Ibero-American countries. It aims to forge closer cooperation ties, solidarity and professional development.

== XIX General Assembly of the AIAMP, held in Brasília in December 2011 ==
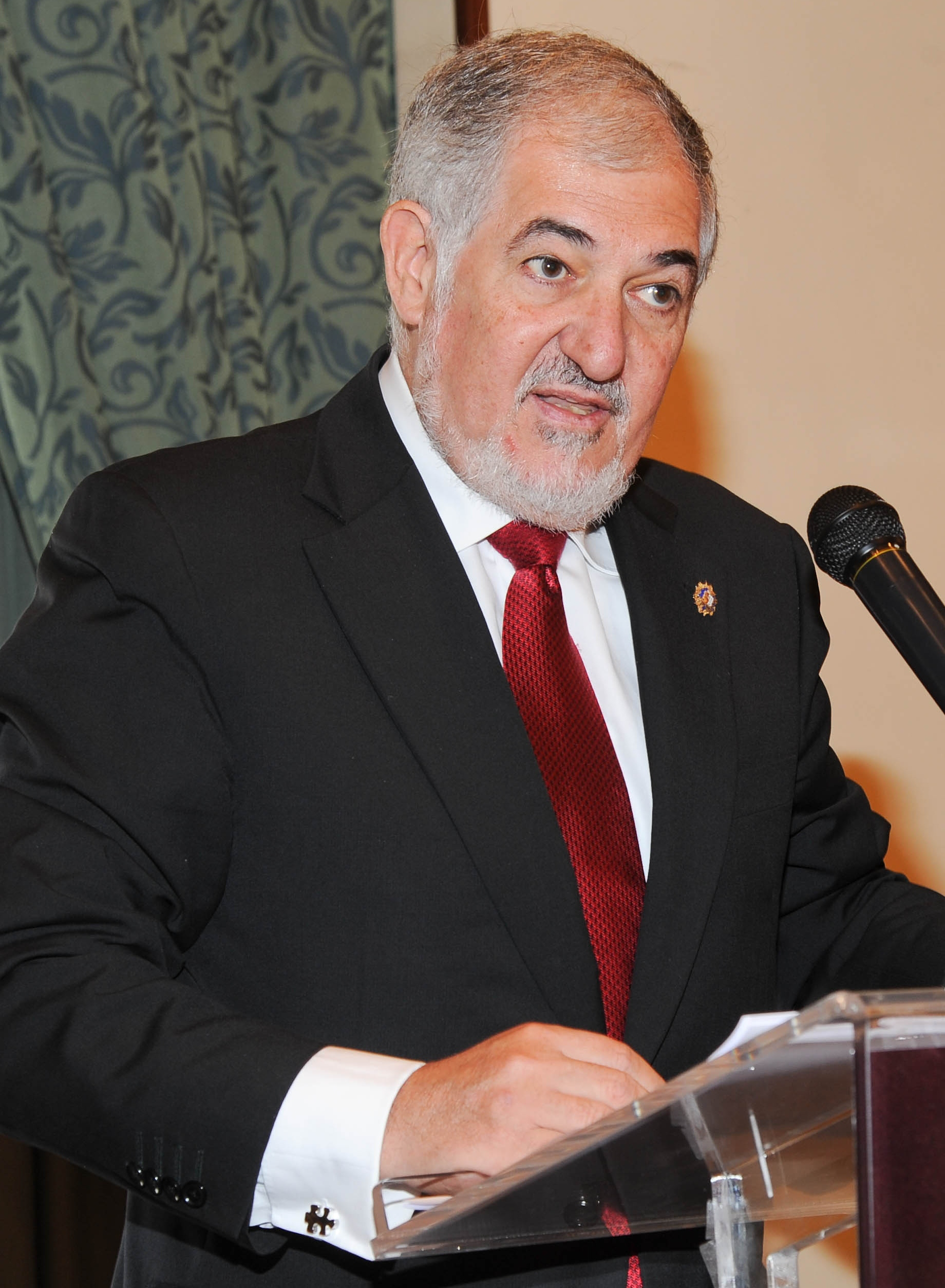
Cándido Conde-Pumpido, Attorney General of Spain and President of AIAMP, 2007–2011

"Corruption: Need for Efficient Punishment" was one of the issues discussed during the Ibero-American Seminar on New Forms of Crime, held in Brasília, December 5, 2011. The seminar brings together 21 countries members to the Ibero-American Association of Public Prosecutor's Offices (AIAMP).

Opening the meeting, the attorney general of Brazil, Roberto Gurgel, highlighted the importance of international legal cooperation in combating transnational crimes and called attention to the fight against corruption. He recalled that December 9 the International Day Against Corruption and that the challenges are magnified to the extent that criminals find new practices. "Our persecution institutions should bring together efforts to combat this type of crime and should be in line with international regulatory frameworks to enhance mutual legal assistance," he said.

The Attorney General of Spain and President of AIAMP, Cándido Conde-Pumpido Touron, also stressed the importance of fight against corruption. He quoted the experience of his country with the creation of a corruption specialized attorney and stressed that society requires from the Public Ministry "strict and rigorous behavior".

On Tuesday, December 6, member countries open the 19th Assembly of the Ibero-American Association of Public Prosecutor's Offices. The event takes place in Brasília.

== Attorneys general will create Ibero-American network on human trafficking ==
Attorneys general of Latin America will create a regional network of specialized prosecutors against Trafficking in Persons. The network is part of the cooperation protocol signed during the Second Ibero-American Summit against the Human Trafficking held in Santiago, Chile, from September 21 to 23, 2011. The aim is to strengthen the prosecution of traffickers, the assistance and protection provided to victims and witnesses of human trafficking, a crime that affects millions of people around the world.

The expectation is that the network becomes fully operational in a month. The Attorneys General also signed a protocol that determines how the joint operations and protection mechanisms for victims will work.

"Both members of the American Association of Public Prosecutors and the meeting of the Public Prosecutors of Mercosur transmitted to the Attorney General of Chile their keen interest in taking a new step in the fight against human trafficking, a challenge that we accept and we are deeply honored", said Sabas Chahuán, during the closing ceremony of the Summit.

The Iberoamerican Summit included seven plenary sessions and three working groups to address issues such as Human Trafficking for Sexual Exploitation, for Forced Labor, the Smuggling of Migrants, legislative analysis on the matter and the experiences of all countries participating in the prosecution of these crimes and in international cooperation.

The summit was held in the Chilean headquarters of the Economic Commission for Latin America and the Caribbean (ECLAC) with the participation of the President of the AIAMP (the Ibero-American Association of Public Prosecutors), the Attorney General of Spain, Cándido Conde-Pumpido, Regional Vice-presidents and all the Attorneys General of the Meeting of MERCOSUR. Also present were 35 prosecutors specialized in South America, 6 prosecutors and Federal Agents from the U.S., 8 international experts and over 70 national guests.

Organized by the Attorney General of Chile, the Ibero-American Association of Public Prosecutors (AIAMP) and Meeting of Mercosur Prosecutors (REMPM), the meeting was sponsored by UNODC through the Global Project for the implementation of the Protocol against Trafficking in Persons and the Smuggling of Migrants.

=== First Iberoamerican Summit of Public Prosecutors Offices against Human Trafficking ===
In Santiago, Chile, between December 17 and 19, 2008, was held the First Iberoamerican Summit of Public Prosecutors Offices against Human Trafficking. This summit was organized by the Iberoamerican Association of Public Prosecution Offices (AIAMP) together with other partners.

The General Prosecutor and/or General Attorney or their representatives after analyzing the phenomenon of human trafficking and its implications in Iberoamerica and having exchanged experiences on the investigation, prosecution and international criminal cooperation, stated the following:

Whereas, the Quito Declaration of the Iberoamerican Association of Public Prosecution Offices of 2003, where it was agreed to undertaking the increase of international criminal cooperation on the part of the Public Prosecutors Offices.

Bearing in mind, the Work Plan of AIAMP for the period 2006 to 2010, which defines as priority subject "The protection of victims and witnesses".

In compliance with the seminar, "Victims and Witnesses Protection. The role of the Fiscal Ministry" held in Madrid in October 2007, within the framework of the XV General Assembly of the Iberoamerican Association of Public Prosecutors Offices, where it was agreed to create two working commissions: one to address victim's protections, and the second to face witness's protection.

Considering, that the aforementioned commissions finished their work in a meeting held in Chile, between June 16 to 18, where it was agreed a document that aims the adoption by the Association of an internal and public commitment with respect to the orientations that must outline the action of the Iberoamerican Prosecutors in relation to victims and witnesses, with special emphasis to the human trafficking victims.

Taking into consideration, that in the XVI General Assembly of the AIAMP, held in Dominican Republic in June 2008, the document presented by the experts group was unanimously approved and denominated "Santiago's Guide on Victims and Witness Protection"

Finally, bearing in mind that in the same XVI General Assembly of IAMP was also approved by the same Assembly to incorporate the "Brazilian Rules on Justice Access to Persons in Vulnerable Conditions", which are fully applicable in cases of human trafficking victims. Concludes,

Subscribers' commitment in order to intensify their cooperation among the Public Prosecutors Offices of the Region that would directly benefit the fight against human trafficking supported by the international criminal cooperation, assistance and protection to victims and witnesses, always within the scope of its competences.

International Cooperation. Favor the international fight against human trafficking, among others, by means of:

- The dissemination and training of the various international documents related with the crime of human trafficking.
- The strengthening of the central authorities in matters of international cooperation in those cases in which these are within the Public Prosecutors Offices.
- The exchange of successful experiences in matters of international criminal cooperation.
- The generation of activities or international events that foster the exchange of successful experiences as well as difficulties associated to combating trafficking crime.

Investigation. To favor the international combating of human trafficking, by means, among others:

- The exchange of successful experiences on matters of investigation and combat of human trafficking.
- The Development of fluent channels of cooperation and coordination that allow the exchange of information of local investigations that have or may have repercussion or linkages with other countries.
- The creation – whenever it is juridical and feasible possible – of joint investigation teams.
- The strengthening and exchange of good practices and special investigation techniques.

Attention and Protection of victims and witnesses. Favor the international combat of human trafficking by means, among others of:

- The design and implementation of specialized and differentiated intervention that allows to provide attention and protection to the victims according to their needs and specific requirements within the scope of orientation, protection and support, always and when this was possible and viable taking into account the internal legislation of each country.
- The realization of actions tending to provide the human trafficking victim the necessary information on its capacity as such, its rights and the protection they deserve, role and importance of its declaration in the penal process.
- The development of strategies tending to avoid retracting from the human trafficking victims by optimizing their collaboration in the criminal lawsuit.
- The autonomous and/or coordinate work with other institutions according to the case, favoring the protection of trafficking crime victims and witnesses, trying whenever possible and viable taking into consideration the internal legislation of each country:
- The generation of risk evaluations that allows adopting efficient and effective protection actions in the concrete case of human trafficking.
- The creation of procedures for adopting prompt protection actions for the human trafficking victims that allows its adoption in an expeditious way.
- The application of processes that allows avoiding the re-victimization and that, in addition provides the possibility for them to promptly initiate their return to the country of origin, if the human trafficking victims wish to do so.
- The generation of links with the state and non governmental organizations that provide social benefits to human trafficking victims by means of protocols, agreements or communication mechanisms, in order to executed derivations or to requests their collaborations thru standardized procedures.
- The work in favor of establishing expeditious communication and coordination channels with responsible migration organizations.
