= María Luisa Balaguer =

Spanish jurist and professor (born 1953)

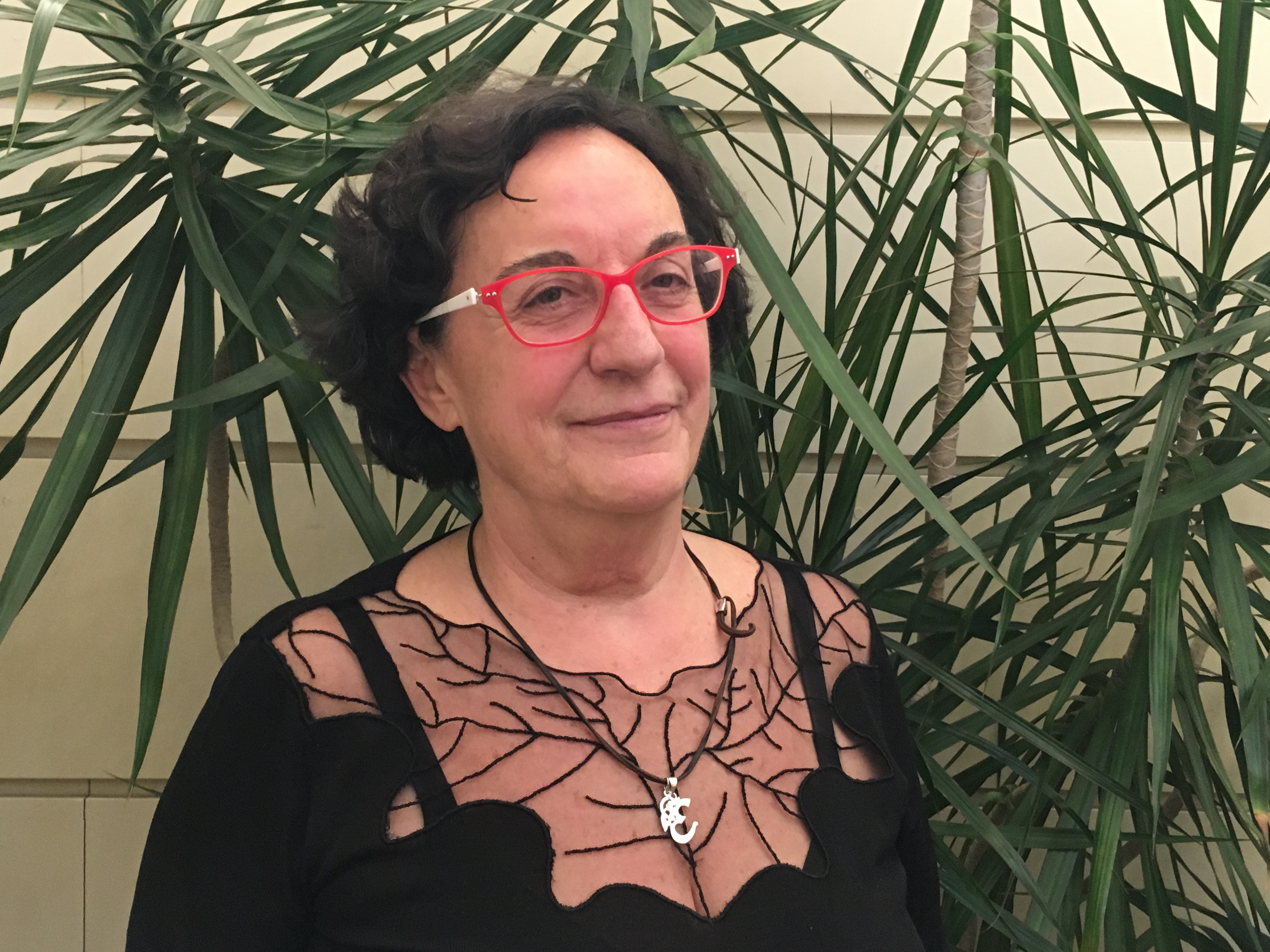
- Balaguer in 2014

Judge of the Constitutional Court of Spain
- Incumbent
- Assumed office 15 March 2017
- Appointed by: Senate of Spain

Personal details
- Born: 1953 (age 72–73) Almería, Andalusia, Spain
- Education: University of Granada

María Luisa Balaguer Callejón (born 1953) is a Spanish jurist, lawyer and professor of constitutional law. She has been judge of the Constitutional Court of Spain since 2017 and she is an expert on gender equality.

== Early life and education ==
Balaguer was born in 1953 in Almería, Andalusia, Spain. She got a degree in law in 1976 from the University of Granada, where obtained a PhD in 1984 with a his thesis on ideology and the media at Televisión Española.

== Career ==
Between 1977 and 2003 she practised as a lawyer in Málaga, served as a member of the Andalusian Advisory Council and, in 1980, became a lecturer in the faculties of Law and Journalism at the University of Málaga.

An expert in gender equality, Balaguer has served on the ethics committee of the Regional Ministry of Health, the Advertising Observatory of the Andalusian Institute for Women, and the advisory council for the modernisation of the State of the Autonomous Communities of the Government of Andalucía. In 2003, Balaguer became the first Andalusian woman to be appointed professor of Constitutional Law.

In January 2017 the Parliament of Andalusia proposed her to become judge of the Constitutional Court of Spain, and was appointed by the Senate of Spain. As a judge, she has maintained a progressive stance. She disagreed with the ruling that upheld ‘on-the-spot’ deportations, opposed the ruling that declared the state of alarm approved in March 2020 during the COVID-19 pandemic in the country to be unconstitutional, and has advocated for the need to modernise the Constitution of Spain. She is the judge who has issued the most dissenting opinions. Following the reshuffle of the Constitutional Court approved at the end of 2021, Balaguer stood as a candidate for the presidency of the Court, but it was ultimately Cándido Conde-Pumpido who was elected in January 2023.
