= José María Romero de Tejada =

Spanish conservative jurist

Superior Prosecutor of Catalonia
- In office July 2013 – 27 November 2017
- Preceded by: Martín Rodríguez Sol
- Succeeded by: Francisco Bañeres Santos

Personal details
- Born: 15 August 1948 Barcelona, Spain
- Died: 27 November 2017 (aged 69) Barcelona, Spain
- Cause of death: pneumonia and leukemia

José María Romero de Tejada Gómez (15 August 1948 – 27 November 2017) was a Spanish prosecutor who was the Superior Prosecutor of Catalonia from 2013 until his death in 2017.

== Biography and career ==
Born in Barcelona, Romero de Tejada studied law at the University of Barcelona between 1965 and 1970, where he continued teaching as a teacher. When he was 25 years old he entered the judicial school and the first destination was Las Palmas de Gran Canaria. In September 1974, he began work at the Public Prosecutor of Barcelona, where he was a deputy prosecutor of the Superior Court of Justice of Barcelona. In the 80s, he was positioned in favor of the actions of the then anti-corruption prosecutor Carlos Jiménez Villarejo in the Banca Catalana case.

He was appointed top prosecutor of Catalonia in July 2013, after the Prosecutor General of the State forced to resign Martín Rodríguez Sol because he defended the celebration of the 2014 Catalan self-determination referendum.

By order of prosecutor general Eduardo Torres-Dulce, Romero de Tejada filed the complaint that led Judgment against Artur Mas, former President of the Government of Catalonia; Joana Ortega, former vice president of the Government of Catalonia and Irene Rigau, former Regional Minister of Education, for the 2014 referendum. This happened in the moment when the Catalan prosecutors, in extraordinary meeting, had considered that it did not have to be filled.

== Spanish constitutional crisis ==
On 23 September 2017 Romero de Tejada placed the lieutenant colonel, Diego Pérez de los Cobos Orihuel, as the head of the State security forces and bodies in Catalonia, including the Mossos d'Esquadra–in parallel to Operation Anubis–when the Spanish government tried to restrain the self-determination referendum on 1 October. On 25 September he ordered the Mossos to go to all polling stations in search of ballot boxes and to warn their perpetrators that it was a crime to cede those locales. Moreover, he presented complaints to the High Court of Justice of Catalonia against the regional president Carles Puigdemont, and his cabinet, and against the Bureau of Parliament for the sovereignty process. He communicated to major of the Mossos, Josep Lluís Trapero Álvarez this instruction, who acted quickly.

== Death ==
Romero de Tejada died on 27 November 2017 from leukemia, aggravated by pneumonia, at the age of 69 in a hospital in Barcelona. Coincidentally, his death occurred just nine days after the sudden death of the prosecutor general José Manuel Maza.

== See also ==
- Judiciary of Spain
- 2017 Spanish constitutional crisis
- Operation Anubis
