= Jesús Cardenal =

Spanish lawyer

The Most Excellent Jesús Cardenal OSRP
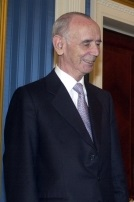

Prosecutor General of the State
- In office 11 May 1997 – 22 April 2004
- Preceded by: Juan Ortiz Úrculo
- Succeeded by: Cándido Conde-Pumpido

Personal details
- Born: 20 February 1930 Pesquera de Duero, Spain
- Died: 25 June 2018 (aged 88) Madrid, Spain
- Education: University of Valladolid; University of Navarra

Jesús Cardenal Fernández (20 February 1930 – 25 June 2018) was a Spanish lawyer who served as Prosecutor General of the State from 1997 to 2004.
