= Roberto Gurgel =

Brazilian prosecutor (born 1954)

Prosecutor General Roberto Gurgel
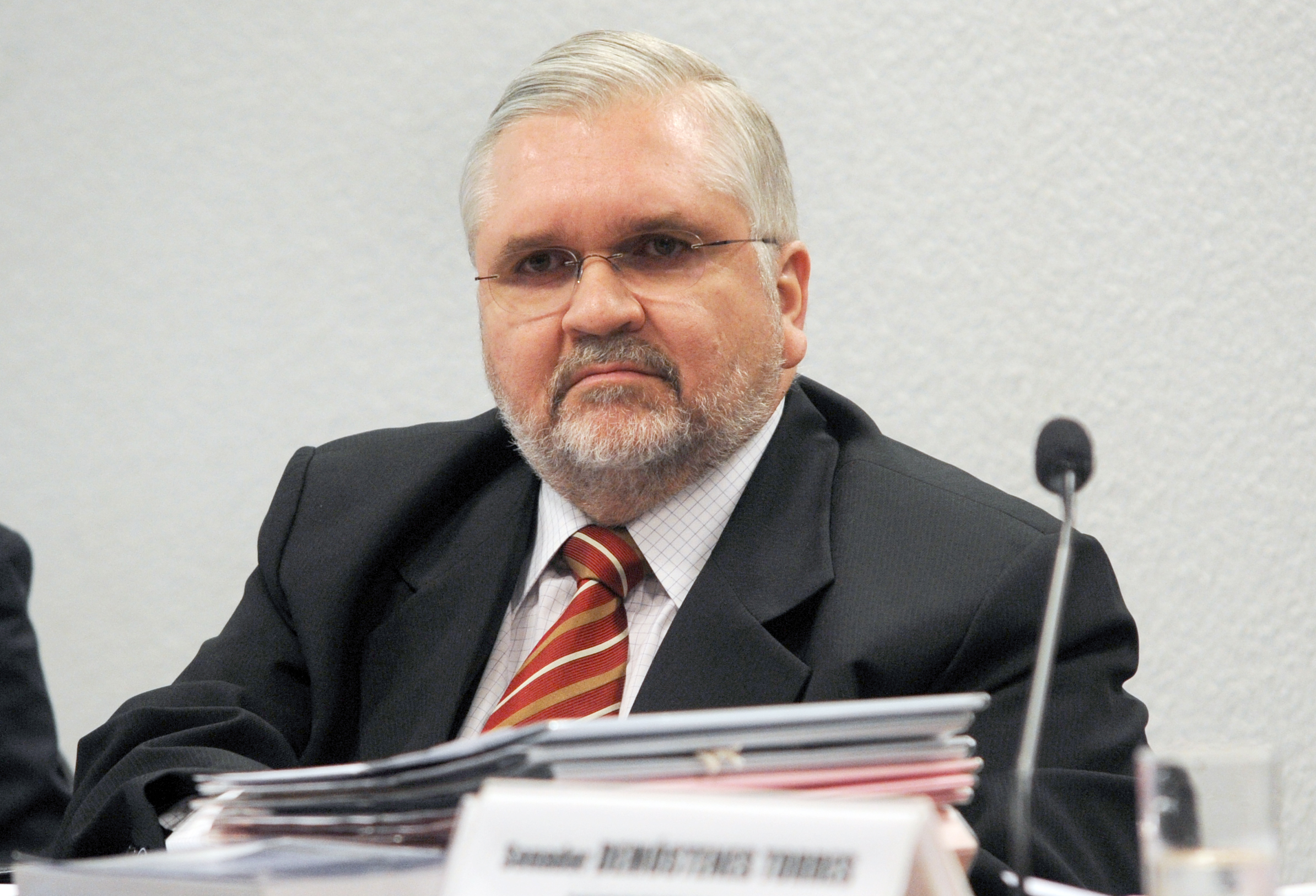

Prosecutor General of the Republic
- In office July 22, 2009 – August 14, 2013
- Appointed by: Luiz Inácio Lula da Silva; Dilma Rousseff
- Preceded by: Antonio Fernado de Souza
- Succeeded by: Rodrigo Janot

President of the Ibero-American Association of Public Prosecutors
- In office December 7, 2011 – August 14, 2013
- Preceded by: Cándido Conde-Pumpido
- Succeeded by: Rodrigo Janot

Personal details
- Born: September 24, 1954 (age 72) Fortaleza, Ceará, Brazil
- Education: Federal University of Rio de Janeiro (LL.B.)
- Profession: Prosecutor of the Republic

Roberto Monteiro Gurgel Santos (born September 24, 1954, Fortaleza) is a Brazilian lawyer and a former Prosecutor General of the Republic.

Legal offices
Preceded by Antonio Fernando de Souza	Prosecutor General of the Republic; 2009–13	Succeeded by Rodrigo Janot
Transnational offices
Preceded by Cándido Conde-Pumpido as Fiscal General of Spain	President of the Ibero-American Association of Public Prosecutors as Prosecutor General of Brazil; 2011–13	Succeeded by Rodrigo Janot as Prosecutor General of Brazil
