= María Luisa Segoviano =

Spanish judge (born 1950)

Judge of the Constitutional Court of Spain
- Incumbent
- Assumed office 9 January 2023

Judge of the Supreme Court of Spain
- In office 2006 – October 2022

Personal details
- Born: 1950 (age 75–76) Valladolid, Castile and León, Spain
- Education: University of Valladolid

María Luisa Segoviano Astaburuaga (born October 1950) is a Spanish jurist expert on employment and labour law. Since 9 January 2023, she has been a judge of the Spanish Constitutional Court. She was Justice of the Supreme Court from 2006 until October 2022. In November 2020 she became the first woman to chair a Section of the Supreme Court in its 200 years of history.

== Biography ==
Segoviano was born in October 1950 in Valladolid, Spain. Her father was a magistrate and her mother had also studied law at a time when she was only one of two women in class. "They even had to leave the classroom when the professor of Criminal Law was going to explain issues such as rape, as this could not be discussed in front of ladies", Segoviano explained in an interview. That was the environment in which she and her six siblings grew.

She has a Law Degree from the University of Valladolid, and she received an extraordinary prize of the Lasalle-Boluda Foundation.

She become secretary of employment courts in 1974, which she carried out in Barcelona, Palencia and Valladolid until October 1987, when she became a member of the judiciary. Her first position was in a court of first instance of Bilbao, a time she remembers as «the toughest, difficult years in a complicated political environment». She has subsequently occupied several positionsː chair of the Employment Chamber of the High Court of Castilla y León (1997-2006); Justice of the Supreme Court (2006); Chair of the Employment Chamber of the Supreme Court (2020), and she was the first woman to chair a Chamber of the Supreme Court. She was also a member of the Junta Electoral Central from 2012 to 2017.

On 20th October 2022 she retired when reaching the maximum legal age.

=== Justice of the Constitutional Court ===
On 27th December 2022 she was unanimously chosen by the General Council of the Judicial Power to become Justice of the Constitutional Court, together with César Tolosa. She assumed her position on 9th January 2023.

=== Academic career ===
She has been a professor of procedural law at the University of Valladolid (1999-2006), and has also carried out training activities for the General Council of the Judicial Power.

== Commitment with equality ==
Some of her judgements have been key to implement the principle of gender equality. One of them required a stricter standard of justification for dismissing a pregnant woman or a woman working reduced hours for childcare, a decision that was essential to the 2019 legislative reform and greater protection for female workers. In another of its rulings, it equated Social Service, known as ‘female military service’ during the Franco era, with male Military Service for Social Security purposes, allowing women who had performed this compulsory service to retire with the same rights as men who had done military service.

About being called a “feminist judge”, she has said "Sometimes, if they say it in a derogatory way, I don't admit it, but if by feminism we mean the staunch defence of equality, then of course I am".

She belongs to several academies and associations.

== Publications ==
She has written several pieces, namely on procedural law, gender equality and insolvency, and articles on human rights, use of new technologies on dismissals, social security and procedural law.

Some of her works include: Derecho Social de la Unión Europea, Principios esenciales de Derecho del Trabajo, El principio de igualdad de trato en materia salarial en el ámbito de las Administraciones Públicas, La responsabilidad en la Seguridad Social o Igualdad en el mundo del trabajo y en la empresa.

== Awards ==
- Honorary Cross of the Order of San Raimundo de Peñafort.
- Puñetas de Oro.
