= Geraldo Brindeiro =

Brazilian jurist, lawyer, and academic (1948–2021)

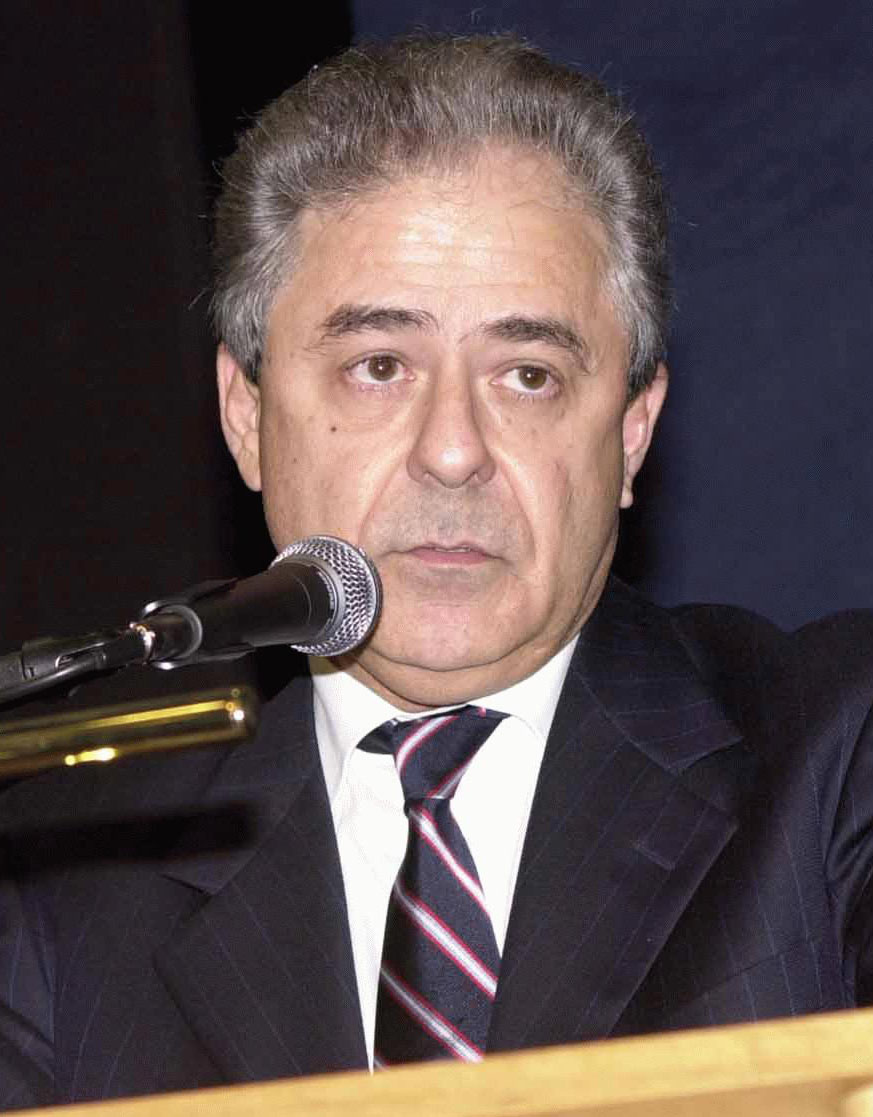

Prosecutor General of the Republic
- In office June 28, 1995 – June 28, 2003
- Preceded by: Aristides Junqueira
- Succeeded by: Claudio Fonteles

Personal details
- Born: 29 August 1948 Recife, Pernambuco, Brazil
- Died: 29 October 2021 (aged 73) Brasília, Brazil
- Spouse: Paula Romaine Brindeiro
- Children: Three

Geraldo Brindeiro (29 August 1948 – 29 October 2021) was a Brazilian jurist, lawyer, and academic.

Brindeiro joined the national Public Prosecutor's Office in 1975. On June 28, 1995, President Fernando Henrique Cardoso appointed him as Prosecutor General of the Republic, the head of the Brazilian Federal Prosecution Office. He was reappointed for three additional terms until his retirement from the office on June 28, 2003, at the end of fourth term.

== Biography ==
Brindeiro was born in Recife on August 29, 1948, to Judite Brindeiro and Djair Brindeiro, a Senator from Pernambuco from 1953 to 1955 and a former mayor of Recife. His paternal uncle, Djaci Falcão, was a justice of the Supreme Federal Court from 1967 to 1989, while his cousin, Marco Maciel, served as Vice President of Brazil from 1995 to 2002.

He received a bachelor's degree in legal and social sciences from the Faculty of Law of Recife (now known as the Law School of the Federal University of Pernambuco) on December 17, 1970. He later completed his Master of Laws (1982) and Doctor of Juridical Science (1990) from Yale Law School in Connecticut.

Geraldo Brindeiro died from complications of COVID-19 in Brasília on October 29, 2021, at the age of 73.
