= Holmes & Watson. Madrid Days =

2012 film by José Luis Garci

Holmes & Watson. Madrid days
- Theatrical release poster
- Directed by: José Luis Garci
- Screenplay by: José Luis Garci; Andrea Tenuta; Maria Sanromán; Eduardo Torres-Dulce
- Based on: Inspired in the characters created by Sir Arthur Conan Doyle
- Produced by: José Luis Garci; José Alberto Sánchez
- Starring: Gary Piquer; José Luis García Pérez; Belén López
- Cinematography: Javier Palacios
- Edited by: José Luis Garci
- Music by: Pablo Cervantes
- Distributed by: Alta Classics
- Release date: 7 September 2012 (Spain)
- Running time: 129 minutes
- Country: Spain
- Language: Spanish

Holmes & Watson. Madrid days is a 2012 Spanish thriller film written, produced and directed by José Luis Garci. It stars Gary Piquer as Sherlock Holmes and José Luis García Pérez as Dr. Watson. The plot brings the characters of Sherlock Holmes and Dr. Watson to Madrid in order to investigate crimes similar to those of Jack the Ripper.

Parts of it were filmed on the Buen Retiro Park in Madrid.

== Cast ==
- Gary Piquer as Sherlock Holmes
- José Luis García Pérez as Dr. Watson
- Belén López as Irene Adler
- Víctor Clavijo as Josito
- Inocencio Arias as a minister
- Enrique Villén as Enrique Valcárcel
- Alberto Ruiz-Gallardón as Isaac Albéniz
- Manuela Velasco as Elena
- Macarena Gómez as Berna
- Manuel Tejada as Marqués de Simancas
- Candela Arroyo as a dancer
- Juan Antonio Muñoz as Don Fernando
- Leticia Dolera a Mary Watson
- Jorge Roelas as Luis Delgado.

== Reception ==
Jonathan Holland for Variety praised the decor and detail of the film but said "dramatically, it’s cardboard."
