= Laura Díez =

Spanish jurist and professor (born 1969)

Judge of the Constitutional Court of Spain
- Incumbent
- Assumed office 9 January 2023
- Appointed by: Government of Spain

Personal details
- Born: 1969 (age 56–57) Barcelona, Catalonia, Spain
- Spouse: Markus González Beilfuss
- Education: University of Barcelona

Laura Díez Bueso (born 1969) is a Spanish jurist and professor of constitutional law. She has been judge of the Constitutional Court of Spain since 2023 and previously served at the Ministry of the Presidency.

== Career ==
Díez was born in 1969 in Barcelona, Catalonia, Spain. She holds a Ph.D. in law from the University of Barcelona, where she began teaching in 1992.

Between 2002 and 2004, Díez served as an advisor to the Catalan government on the reform of the Statute of Autonomy. She worked from 2020 to April 2022 as director general of Constitutional Affairs and Legal Coordination at the Ministry of the Presidency. Díez is professor of constitutional law in the University of Barcelona.

In 2022 Díez was member and vice-president of the Consell de Garanties Estatutàries de Catalunya and had previously served as deputy to the Ombudsman of Catalonia.

Díez was nominated by the Spanish government as judge of the Constitutional Court of Spain in December 2022 and she was sworn in on 9 January 2023 before King Felipe VI. In September 2023, the request for her recusal, submitted by the People's Party on the grounds of her links as a senior official in Pedro Sánchez’s government after upholding an appeal lodged by the PSOE, was rejected.
