= Paulo Gonet =

Brazilian jurist, professor and prosecutor

- Gonet in 2023

43rd Prosecutor General of the Republic
- Incumbent
- Assumed office 18 December 2023
- Appointed by: Luiz Inácio Lula da Silva
- Preceded by: Elizeta Ramos (interim)

Personal details
- Born: Paulo Gustavo Gonet Branco; 16 August 1961 (age 65) Rio de Janeiro, Brazil
- Education: University of Brasília (LL.B.); University of Essex (LL.M.); University of Brasília (LL.D.)
- Profession: Federal prosecutor

Paulo Gustavo Gonet Branco (born August 16, 1961) is a Brazilian jurist, professor and prosecutor. A member of the Federal Public Ministry of Brazil since 1987, he is the current Prosecutor General of the Republic.

Together with Supreme Federal Court Justice Gilmar Mendes, he wrote the book Constitutional Law Course, which won the Jabuti Prize in 2008. He is also one of the founders of the Brazilian Institute of Education, Development and Research.

== Career ==
Gonet graduated in law from the University of Brasília, in 1982. He concluded his master's degree in human rights at the University of Essex in 1990, and his doctorate in law, state and constitution at the University of Brasília, in 2008.

From 1982 to 1987, he worked in the Supreme Federal Court as an assistant to Justice Francisco Rezek, who had been his professor in law school.

He passed the civil service entrance examinations in the first positions for the office of prosecutor in the Public Ministry of the Federal District and Territories and the Federal Public Ministry. Having opted for the latter, he became a prosecutor of the Republic in 1987 and was promoted to Deputy Prosecutor General of the Republic in 2012.

Since he joined the Federal Public Ministry before the 1988 Constitution was in effect, he is not barred from working as a lawyer, having done so since 1994, also becoming a partner at the law firm Sergio Bermudes Advogados in Brasília. In November 2023, he stopped working as a lawyer, asking for his register in the Order of Attorneys of Brazil to be suspended.

In Brasília, together with Gilmar Mendes and Inocêncio Mártires Coelho, he founded in 1998 the Brasiliense Institute of Public Law (IDP), currently known as the Brazilian Institute of Education, Development and Research, remaining associated with it until 2017. He also wrote the book Constitutional Law Course in 2007 with these two other authors. It won an award in the 50th Jabuti Prize as the third best law book of 2008.

Gonet is a council member in the Center for Higher Studies in Control and Public Administration at the Federal Court of Accounts.

He was also General Director of the Higher School of the Public Ministry of the Union between December 2019 and July 2021.

Since July 29, 2021, he is the Deputy Electoral General Prosecutor. He led the Electoral Public Ministry during the 2022 general elections. In July 2023, he presented an opinion to the Superior Electoral Court of Brazil in favour of convicting former president Jair Bolsonaro for abuse of political power.

== Awards and titles ==
- Jabuti Prize, Brazilian Book Chamber, 2008.
- Commander of the Order of Merit of Labor Justice, Superior Labor Court, 2004.
- Commander of the Order of Rio Branco, Ministry of Foreign Affairs, 2002.

Legal offices
| Preceded by Elizeta Ramos (interim) | 43rd Prosecutor General of the Republic; 2023−present | Incumbent |
Order of precedence
| Preceded by Justices of the Supreme Federal Court | Brazilian order of precedence 19th in line as Prosecutor General of the Republic | Followed by Governors of States |
