= Raquel Dodge =

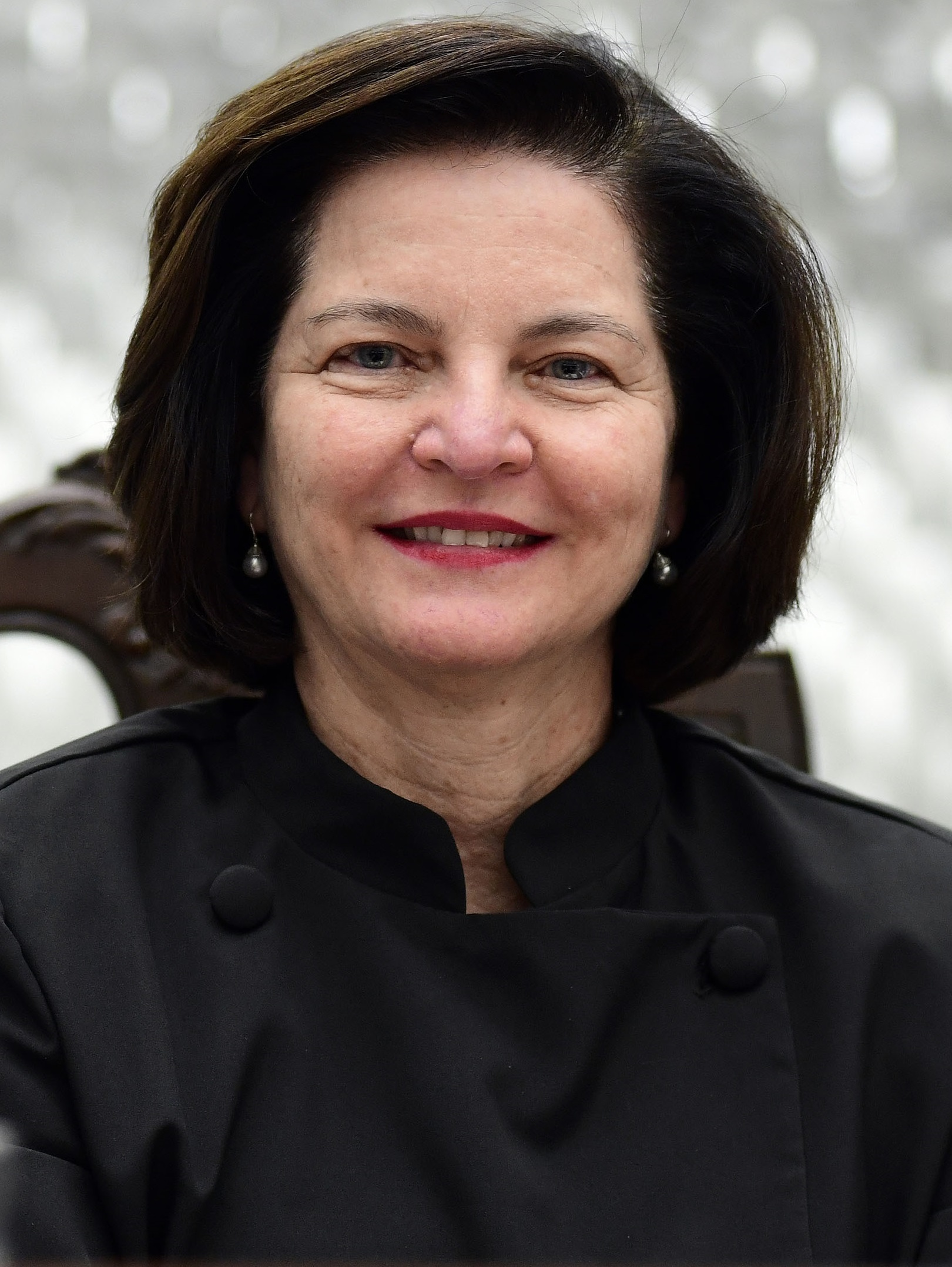
- Dodge in April 2019

Prosecutor General of the Republic
- In office 18 September 2017 – 17 September 2019
- Nominated by: Michel Temer
- Preceded by: Rodrigo Janot
- Succeeded by: Augusto Aras

Personal details
- Born: Raquel Elias Ferreira; 26 July 1961 (age 65) Morrinhos, Goiás, Brazil
- Spouse: Bradley Lay Dodge (m. 1992)
- Children: 2
- Education: University of Brasília (B); Harvard University (M)
- Occupation: Prosecutor General of Brazil

Raquel Elias Ferreira Dodge (born 26 July 1961) is a former Prosecutor General of Brazil. Previously, she was a sub-prosecutor general of the Republic and served as the Prosecutor General of the Republic from 2017 to 2019.

== Biography ==
Dodge was born on 26 July 1961 in Vila Bela neighborhood of Morrinhos, Goiás to lawyer José Rodrigues Ferreira and housewife Ivone Elias Cândido Ferreira. She was baptized the following day, which she was born. Her aunt, Ivonete Elias Cândido, was a teacher at Coronel Pedro Nunes School and was responsible for her education at the school.

She also served on the Superior Council of the Public Prosecutor's Office and was coordinator of the Criminal Chamber of the Public Prosecutor's Office. She holds a bachelor's degree in law and state from the University of Brasília (UnB) in 1986 and a masters in law from the University of Harvard in 2007. She joined the public prosecutor's office in 1987.

From 2005 to 2006, she participated in a human rights program at Harvard University. She was part of the team that drafted the first national plan for the eradication of slave labor in Brazil in 2003, and participated in Operation Caixa de Pandora, which started in 2009 and investigated the scheme of tips for politicians in the Federal District.

On 28 June 2017, Dodge was appointed by president Michel Temer to substitute the Prosecutor General of the Republic, Rodrigo Janot, even being in second place in the triple list sent by the National Association of Prosecutor of the Republic to the Presidency of the Republic, which is not constitutionally or legally obligated to nominate any one of the appointed ones. On 12 July 2017, her appointment was approved by the Senate with 74 votes for and 1 against the nomination. On the next day, she was officially nominated by president Temer.

She is married to Bradley Dodge, an American citizen living in Brazil and worked as a teacher at the School of the Nations, an educational institution for children of members of the diplomatic corps of Brasilia.

Legal offices
Preceded by Rodrigo Janot	Prosecutor General of the Republic; 2017−2019	Succeeded by Augusto Aras
