= Prosecutor General of the Republic (Brazil) =

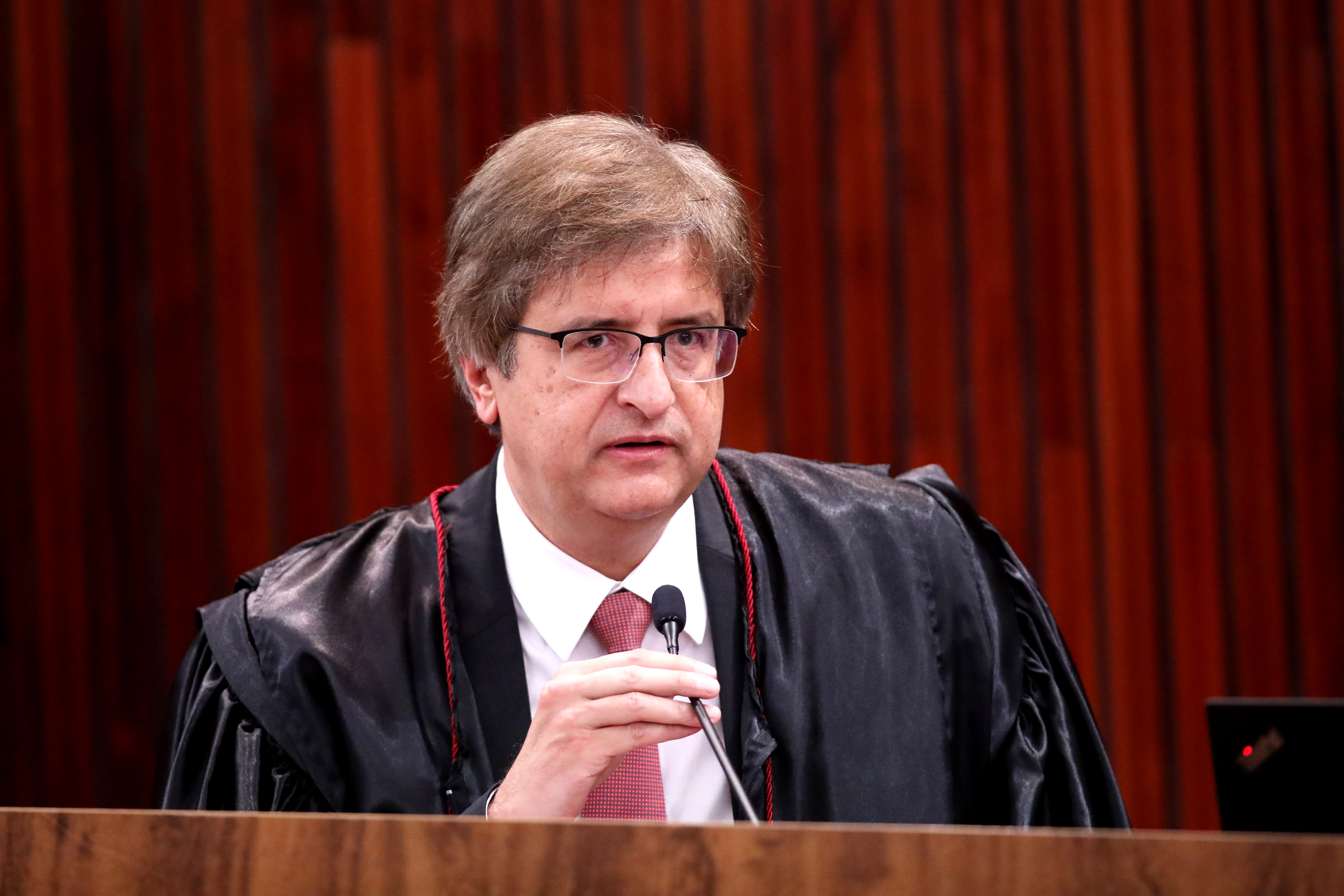
- Incumbent; Paulo Gonet Branco since 18 December 2023
- Public Prosecutor's Office
- Style: Mr. or Madam Prosecutor General (informal); The Most Excellent Prosecutor General (formal)
- Seat: Supreme Federal Court Palace and Public Prosecutor's Head Office
- Appointer: The president with Senate advice and consent
- Term length: Two years renewable
- Formation: 3 March 1891
- First holder: José Júlio de Albuquerque Barros
- Website: www.mpf.mp.br/pgr

The prosecutor general of the Republic (Portuguese: procurador-geral da República) is the head of the Brazilian Federal Prosecution Office, an autonomous agency in charge of criminal prosecution and the defense of society in general. The prosecutor general heads a group of independent prosecutors (Procuradores da República), who work to investigate and prosecute criminal, labor, and civil offenses committed against society. It is a position appointed by the president of the Republic and the nomination must be approved by the Federal Senate.

Paulo Gustavo Gonet Branco has been the prosecutor general of Brazil since 18 December 2023.

== List of prosecutors general ==
No.	Portrait	Prosecutor General	Took office	Left office	Time in office	Appointer
1	José Júlio de Albuquerque Barros, Baron of Sobral	José Júlio de Albuquerque Barros, Baron of Sobral (1836–1893)	3 March 1891	31 August 1893	2 years, 181 days	Deodoro da Fonseca (Ind)
2	Ovídio Fernandes	Ovídio Fernandes (1828–1904)	18 September 1894	29 September 1894	11 days	Floriano Peixoto (Ind)
3	Antônio de Sousa Martins	Antônio de Sousa Martins (1829–1896)	20 October 1894	25 December 1896	2 years, 66 days	Floriano Peixoto (Ind)
4	Lúcio de Mendonça	Lúcio de Mendonça (1854–1909)	7 January 1897	2 August 1897	207 days	Prudente de Morais (PR Federal)
5	Joaquim Antunes Júnior	Joaquim Antunes Júnior (1844–1917)	2 August 1897	23 August 1897	21 days	Prudente de Morais (PR Federal)
6	João Pedro Belfort	João Pedro Belfort (1846–1910)	24 August 1897	2 August 1898	343 days	Prudente de Morais (PR Federal)
7	Antonio Castro	Antonio Castro (1838–1919)	17 December 1898	11 March 1901	2 years, 84 days	Campos Sales (Republican Party of São Paulo)
8	Epitácio Pessoa	Epitácio Pessoa (1865–1942)	7 June 1902	21 October 1905	3 years, 136 days	Campos Sales (Republican Party of São Paulo)
9	Pedro Ribeiro	Pedro Ribeiro (1851–1917)	21 October 1905	6 December 1909	4 years, 46 days	Rodrigues Alves (Republican Party of São Paulo)
10	Joaquim Natal	Joaquim Natal (1860–1933)	6 December 1909	14 November 1910	343 days	Nilo Peçanha (PRF)
11	Antônio Cardoso de Castro	Antônio Cardoso de Castro (1860–1911)	25 November 1910	26 October 1911	335 days	Hermes da Fonseca (PRC)
12	Edmundo Barreto	Edmundo Barreto (1864–1934)	6 September 1911	29 June 1919	7 years, 296 days	Hermes da Fonseca (PRC)
13	Joaquim Pires de Carvalho	Joaquim Pires de Carvalho (1865–1954)	6 August 1919	18 February 1931	107 years, 32 days	Epitácio Pessoa (Minas Republican Party)
14	Antônio Bento de Faria	Antônio Bento de Faria (1876–1959)	28 March 1931	2 August 1934	3 years, 127 days	Getúlio Vargas (Ind)
15	Carlos Maximiliano	Carlos Maximiliano (1873–1960)	2 August 1934	21 April 1936	1 year, 263 days	Getúlio Vargas (Ind)
16	Gabriel Passos	Gabriel Passos (1901–1962)	27 May 1936	17 May 1945	8 years, 355 days	Getúlio Vargas (Ind)
17	Hahnemann Guimarães	Hahnemann Guimarães (1901–1980)	17 May 1945	31 January 1946	259 days	Getúlio Vargas (Ind)
18	Themístocles Cavalcanti	Themístocles Cavalcanti (1899–1980)	20 February 1946	6 October 1947	1 year, 228 days	Eurico Gaspar Dutra (PSD)
19	Luís Gallotti	Luís Gallotti (1904–1978)	13 October 1947	12 September 1949	1 year, 334 days	Eurico Gaspar Dutra (PSD)
20	Plínio Travassos	Plínio Travassos (1893–1962)	23 September 1949	24 January 1957	7 years, 123 days	Eurico Gaspar Dutra (PSD)
21	Carlos Medeiros	Carlos Medeiros (1907–1983)	7 February 1957	5 December 1960	3 years, 302 days	Juscelino Kubitschek (PSD)
22	Cândido de Oliveira Neto	Cândido de Oliveira Neto (1902–1973)	12 December 1960	31 January 1961	50 days	Juscelino Kubitschek (PSD)
23	Joaquim Mendes de Almeida	Joaquim Mendes de Almeida (1906–1990)	20 March 1961	13 September 1961	177 days	Jânio Quadros (PTN)
24	Evandro Lins e Silva	Evandro Lins e Silva (1912–2002)	14 September 1961	23 January 1963	1 year, 131 days	João Goulart (PTB)
25	Cândido de Oliveira Neto	Cândido de Oliveira Neto (1902–1973)	12 February 1963	6 April 1964	1 year, 54 days	João Goulart (PTB)
26	Osvaldo Trigueiro	Osvaldo Trigueiro (1905–1989)	6 June 1964	24 November 1965	1 year, 171 days	Castelo Branco (Military dictatorship in Brazil)
27	Alcino Salazar	Alcino Salazar	2 December 1965	10 March 1967	1 year, 98 days	Castelo Branco (ARENA)
28	Haroldo Valladão	Haroldo Valladão (1901–1987)	30 March 1967	13 November 1967	228 days	Costa e Silva (ARENA)
29	Décio Miranda	Décio Miranda (1916–2000)	24 November 1967	30 October 1969	1 year, 340 days	Costa e Silva (ARENA)
30	Francisco Xavier de Albuquerque	Francisco Xavier de Albuquerque (1926–2015)	6 November 1969	18 April 1972	2 years, 164 days	Emílio Garrastazu Médici (ARENA)
31	Moreira Alves	Moreira Alves (1933–2023)	18 April 1972	18 June 1975	3 years, 61 days	Emílio Garrastazu Médici (ARENA)
32	Henrique Fonseca de Araújo	Henrique Fonseca de Araújo (1913–1996)	10 July 1975	15 March 1979	3 years, 248 days	Ernesto Geisel (ARENA)
33	Firmino Paz	Firmino Paz (1912–1991)	15 March 1979	11 June 1981	2 years, 88 days	João Figueiredo (ARENA)
34	Inocêncio Mártires Coelho	Inocêncio Mártires Coelho (born 1941)	11 June 1981	15 March 1985	3 years, 277 days	João Figueiredo (PDS)
35	Sepúlveda Pertence	Sepúlveda Pertence (1937–2023)	15 March 1985	17 May 1989	4 years, 63 days	José Sarney (MDB)
36	Aristides Junqueira	Aristides Junqueira (born 1942)	20 June 1989	28 June 1995	6 years, 8 days	José Sarney (MDB)
37	Geraldo Brindeiro	Geraldo Brindeiro (1948–2021)	28 June 1995	28 June 2003	8 years, 0 days	Fernando Henrique Cardoso (PSDB)
38	Claudio Fonteles	Claudio Fonteles (born 1946)	30 June 2003	29 January 2005	1 year, 213 days	Luiz Inácio Lula da Silva (PT)
39	Antonio Fernando de Souza	Antonio Fernando de Souza (born 1948)	30 January 2005	28 June 2009	4 years, 149 days	Luiz Inácio Lula da Silva (PT)
40	Roberto Gurgel	Roberto Gurgel (born 1954)	22 July 2009	15 August 2013	4 years, 24 days	Luiz Inácio Lula da Silva (PT); Dilma Rousseff (PT)
41	Rodrigo Janot	Rodrigo Janot (born 1956)	17 September 2013	17 September 2017	4 years, 0 days	Dilma Rousseff (PT)
42	Raquel Dodge	Raquel Dodge (born 1961)	18 September 2017	17 September 2019	1 year, 364 days	Michel Temer (MDB)
–	Alcides Martins	Alcides Martins (born 1948); Acting	18 September 2019	25 September 2019	7 days	–
43	Augusto Aras	Augusto Aras (born 1958)	26 September 2019	26 September 2023	4 years, 0 days	Jair Bolsonaro (PSL)
–	Elizeta Ramos	Elizeta Ramos (born 1954); Acting	27 September 2023	17 December 2023	81 days	–
44	Paulo Gonet Branco	Paulo Gonet Branco (born 1961)	18 December 2023	Incumbent	2 years, 263 days	Luiz Inácio Lula da Silva (PT)

== See also ==
- Brazilian Public Prosecutor's Office
- Attorney General of Brazil
- Brazilian Ministry of Justice
- Brazilian Public Defender's Office
