= Constitutional Court (Spain) =

Court interpreting the Constitution of Spain

Coordinates: 40.4415°N 3.7176°W

- Tribunal Constitucional

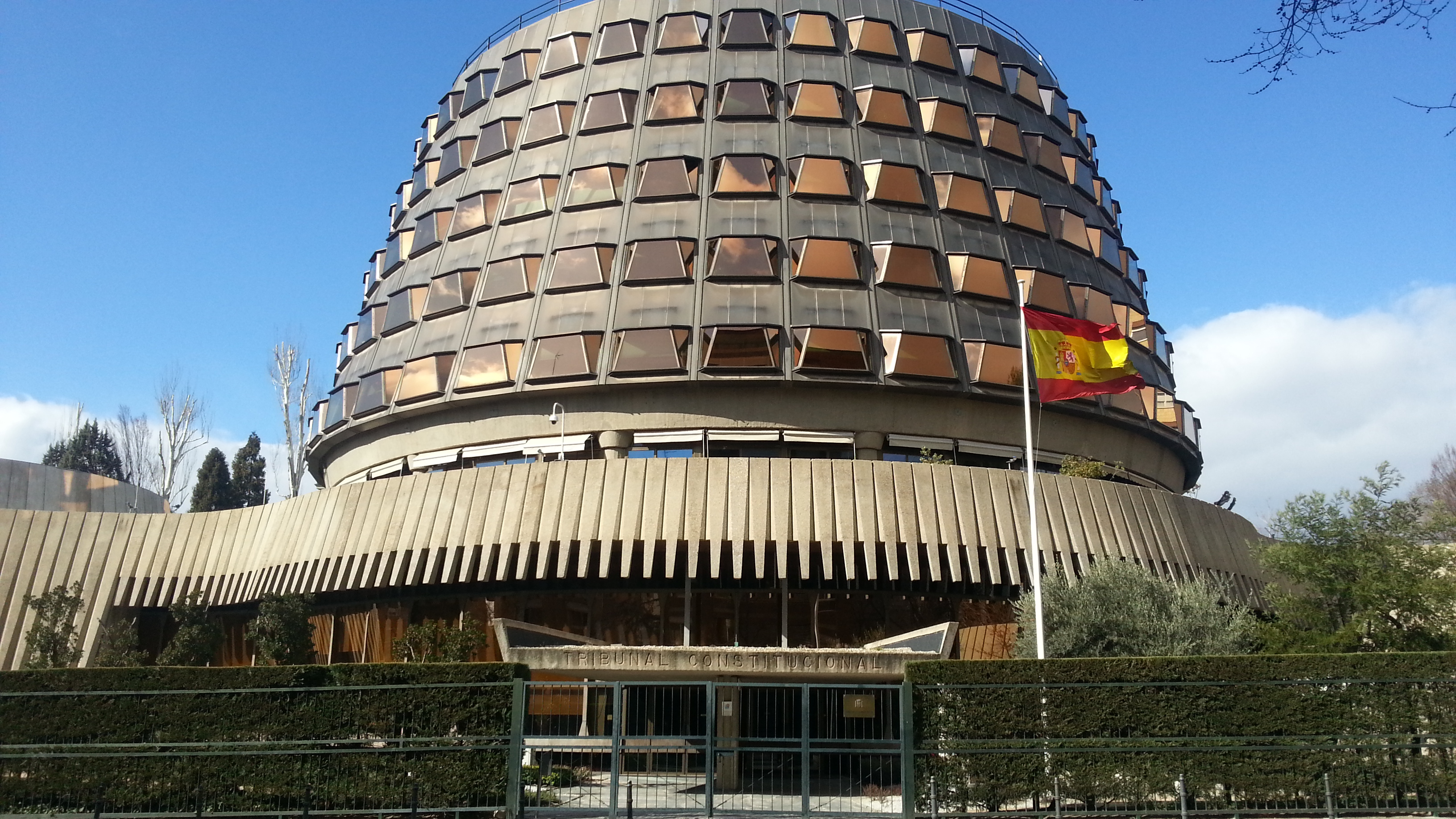
- Headquarters of the Constitutional Court
- Established: July 12, 1980; 46 years ago
- Jurisdiction: Spain
- Location: Madrid
- Composition method: Appointed by the King after being nominated by the Parliament, the General Council of the Judiciary and the Government.
- Authorised by: Spanish Constitution
- Judge term length: 9 years, non renewable
- Number of positions: 12
- Annual budget: € 28.42 million (2022)
- Website: www.tribunalconstitucional.es

President
- Currently: Cándido Conde-Pumpido
- Since: 12 January 2023

Vice President
- Currently: Inmaculada Montalbán Huertas
- Since: 12 January 2023

The Constitutional Court (Spanish: Tribunal Constitucional) (Note: Spanish pronunciation: [tɾiβuˈnal konstituθjoˈnal]) is the supreme interpreter of the Spanish Constitution, with the power to determine the constitutionality of acts and statutes made by any public body, central, regional, or local in Spain. It is defined in Part IX (sections 159 through 165) of the Constitution of Spain, and further governed by Organic Laws 2/1979 (Law of the Constitutional Court of 3 October 1979), 8/1984, 4/1985, 6/1988, 7/1999 and 1/2000. The Court is the "supreme interpreter" of the Constitution, but since the Court is not a part of the Spanish Judiciary, the Supreme Court is the highest court for all judicial matters.

== Powers ==
The Court was established along the lines of the Kelsenian model of constitutional justice, also called the European Model because it has been adopted by most European countries. Unlike the main alternative, the American model, the features of the Kelsenian model are that only a constitutional court is empowered to find that a statute is unconstitutional, secondly that of abstract review (that is without requiring legal cases but rather through application by public institutions), and thirdly, that appointments to the court are made largely by political bodies and have limited terms.

The Constitutional Court is authorized to rule on the constitutionality of laws, acts, or regulations set forth by the national or the regional parliaments. The Court has the power to settle conflicts of jurisdiction between the central and the regional governments. Because many of the constitutional provisions pertaining to autonomy questions are ambiguous and sometimes contradictory, it had been suggested from the outset that the Court would play a critical role in Spain's political and social development.

It also may rule on the constitutionality of international treaties before they are ratified, if requested to do so by the Government, the Congress of Deputies, or the Senate.

The abstract review request, that the court determine the constitutionality of a law, can be brought by the Prime Minister, the Ombudsman, fifty members of congress, fifty senators, the executive or parliaments of an Autonomous Community.

In addition, the Court has other powers not typical of the Kelsenian model including determining whether non-legislative acts by the central government, its branches, or the regional governments abide by the distribution of powers defined by the Constitution and other higher laws, hearing complaints from the public about their constitutional rights and preventive review (prior to promulgation) of statutes of autonomy of the regions.

Individual citizens may appeal to the Constitutional Court for protection against governmental acts that violate their "fundamental rights or freedoms". Only individuals directly affected can make this appeal, called a recurso de amparo, and they can do this only after exhausting judicial appeals.

The General Electoral Law of June 1985 additionally allows appeals to this court in cases where electoral boards exclude candidates from the ballot.

The decisions of the Constitutional Court cannot be appealed.

== Composition ==
This court consists of twelve justices (Spanish: magistrados) who serve for nine-year terms. Four of these are nominated by the Congress of Deputies, four by the Senate, two by the executive branch of the government, and two by the General Council of the Judiciary. Having judges chosen by the three branches of government has not saved the Court from alleged politicisation or accusations of activism.

Justices are formally appointed by the King. The Constitution sets a minimum standard of fifteen years of experience in fields related to jurisprudence, including "magistrates and prosecutors, university professors, public officials and lawyers," and must not contemporaneously hold a position that may detract from their independence, such as a post in a political party or a representative position.

Amongst and by the justices of the Court, a President is elected for a three-year term, who is assisted by a Vice President, who is also justice, and a secretary-general, that is the responsible for overseeing the staff of the court.

=== Current sitting Justices ===
The Constitutional Court consists of a president, currently Cándido Conde-Pumpido, the vice president, currently Inmaculada Montalbán Huertas and ten justices (who can be judges or jurists with relevant experience).

| Magistrate / birthdate and place | Nominated by | Start date / length of service | Previous position or office (most recent prior to joining the Court) |
|---|---|---|---|
| Ricardo Enríquez Sancho; 1944; Madrid, Community of Madrid | Senate | March 19, 2014; 12 years, 191 days | Magistrate of the Supreme Court (2004–2014) |
| Cándido Conde-Pumpido; September 22, 1949; La Coruña, Galicia | Senate | March 15, 2017; 9 years, 195 days | Magistrate of the Supreme Court (2012–2017) |
| María Luisa Balaguer Callejón; 1953; Almería, Andalusia | Senate | March 15, 2017; 9 years, 195 days | Professor of Constitutional Law at the University of Malaga (1999–2017) and Member of the Consultative Council of Andalusia (2005–2017) |
| Juan Ramón Sáez Valcárcel; June 23, 1957; Madrid, Community of Madrid | Congress of Deputies | November 18, 2021; 4 years, 312 days | Magistrate of the Audiencia Nacional (2007–2021) |
| Enrique Arnaldo Alcubilla; 1957; Madrid, Community of Madrid | Congress of Deputies | November 18, 2021; 4 years, 312 days | Clerk of the Cortes Generales (1986–2021) |
| Concepción Espejel Jorquera; September 15, 1959; Madrid, Community of Madrid | Congress of Deputies | November 18, 2021; 4 years, 312 days | Chair of the Criminal Chamber of the Audiencia Nacional (2017–2021) |
| Inmaculada Montalbán Huertas; November 26, 1959; Iznalloz, Andalusia | Congress of Deputies | November 18, 2021; 4 years, 312 days | Chair of the Administrative Chamber of the High Court of Justice of Andalusia, Ceuta and Melilla (2014–2021) |
| Juan Carlos Campo Moreno; October 17, 1961; Osuna, Andalusia | Government | January 9, 2023; 3 years, 260 days | Magistrate of the Audiencia Nacional (2021–2023) |
| Laura Díez Bueso; 1969; Barcelona, Catalonia | Government | January 9, 2023; 3 years, 260 days | Vicepresident of the Council for Statutory Guarantees of Catalonia (2022) |
| María Luisa Segoviano Astaburuaga; 1950; Valladolid, Castile and León | General Council of the Judiciary | January 9, 2023; 3 years, 260 days | Chair of the Labour Chamber of the Supreme Court (2020–2022) |
| César Tolosa Tribiño; 1957; Santa María la Real de Nieva, Castile and León | General Council of the Judiciary | January 9, 2023; 3 years, 260 days | Chair of the Administrative Chamber of the Supreme Court (2020–2022) |
| José María Macías; 1964; Barcelona, Catalonia | Senate | July 30, 2024; 2 years, 58 days | Member of the General Council of the Judiciary (2015–2024) |

=== Emeritus Justices ===
Any previously appointed justice of the Constitutional Court becomes an emeritus justice (Spanish: magistrados eméritos) after their term of office.

== Judicial Behaviour ==
Like many other features of Spanish democratic institutions developed during and after the transition, the design of the court reflects compromises between the reformists within the authoritarian regime and the leftist opposition seeking a rupture with that regime, particularly the Socialist Party (PSOE). Those rules have allowed the political actors to extend their influence through time in determining the composition of the court.

A number of empirical studies show that a non-irrelevant part of the variance judicial decisions is explained by partisan alignments and political context.

Other studies show that many of the court's rulings have been unanimous demonstrating that a lot of the work of the Court is broadly detached from any major partisan-political stakes.

== Notable decisions ==
In 2005, the court ruled that the Spanish judicial system could handle cases concerning crimes against humanity, such as genocide, regardless of whether Spanish citizens were involved or directly affected. In this instance, it reversed the decision made by the Supreme Court in the same case, which held that such cases could be brought before Spanish courts only if a Spanish victim was involved.

In 2005, a challenge before the Court was presented denouncing the Same-sex Marriage Act of 2005 arguing that the Constitution says that «men and women have the right to marry with full legal equality» and this did not allow same-sex marriages. In 2012, after seven years of study, the Court ruled that the Constitution allows same-sex marriages because the social concept of marriage had evolved so the Constitution must to be interpreted according to the current cultural values.

A decision in 2010 annulling 14 articles of the Statute of Autonomy of Catalonia and reinterpreting 27 more has been a source of much controversy and conflict since then, with some arguing that the judgement was illegitimate due to fact that one judge had died and had not been replaced and three other judges terms had expired three years prior to the judgement. It is generally agreed that the Constitutional Court's decision has come at a high cost for Court's prestige and perceived legitimacy and has increased support for independence in the region. Until this decision, the Court was generally regarded as supporting the territorial model of autonomous communities, however the decision 'put the Court at the forefront of political conflict and for the first time very strongly divided specialised scholars, political parties, institutions and public opinion'.

In 2017, the court ordered those responsible for the Catalan referendum on November 9, 2014 to pay 5 million euros. In addition, social agents from Spain have demanded that the distribution of public funds in the Catalan press should be audited.

In 2022 the Court upheld an amparo appeal by the People's Party claiming a violation of their rights to exercise representative office and of the right of citizens to participate in public affairs through those representatives, by legislation which would have made changes to the General Council of the Judiciary to break the Spanish General Council of the Judiciary blockade. The Court ordered that the bill to amend the laws should be suspended. This was the first time that the Constitutional Court had ordered the Parliament in this way. Both the President of the Congress of Deputies Meritxell Batet and the President of the Senate Ander Gil, respected the decision of the Court, although they considered the decision a dangerous precedent since it meant that "the interruption of the legislative power is within the reach of a single deputy filing an appeal" which would prevent the "legitimate representatives of popular sovereignty" from "exercising their functions and debating or voting".

== See also ==
- Austrian System
- Judiciary
- Rule of law
- Rule according to higher law

== Bibliography ==
- Browning Seeley, Jo Ann (1990). "Government and Politics". In Solsten, Eric; Meditz, Sandra W. (eds.). Spain: a country study (2 ed.). Washington, D.C.: Federal Research Division, Library of Congress. OCLC 44200005.
- Casanas Adam, Elisenda (2017). "The Constitutional Court of Spain: From System Balancer to Polarizing Centralist". In Aroney, Nicholas; Kincaid, John (eds.). Courts in Federal Countries. University of Toronto Press. pp. 367–403. ISBN 978-1-4875-1466-2. JSTOR 10.3138/j.ctt1whm97c.16.
- Ferreres Comella, Victor (July 1, 2004). "The European model of constitutional review of legislation: Toward decentralization?". International Journal of Constitutional Law. 2 (3). Oxford University Press: 461–491. doi:10.1093/icon/2.3.461. ISSN 1474-2640. OCLC 1124233270.
- Garoupa, Nuno; Magalhães, Pedro C. (2020). "Judicial Politics: The Constitutional Court". In Muro, Diego; Lago, Ignacio (eds.). The Oxford Handbook of Spanish Politics. Oxford University Press. pp. 268–275. ISBN 978-0-19-882693-4.
- Newton, Michael T.; Donaghy, Peter J. (1997). Institutions of modern Spain : a political and economic guide. Cambridge University Press. ISBN 0-521-57348-3.
- "The Spanish Constitution" (PDF). Agencia Estatal Boletín Oficial del Estado. 1978.
