= Augusto Aras =

Brazilian lawyer

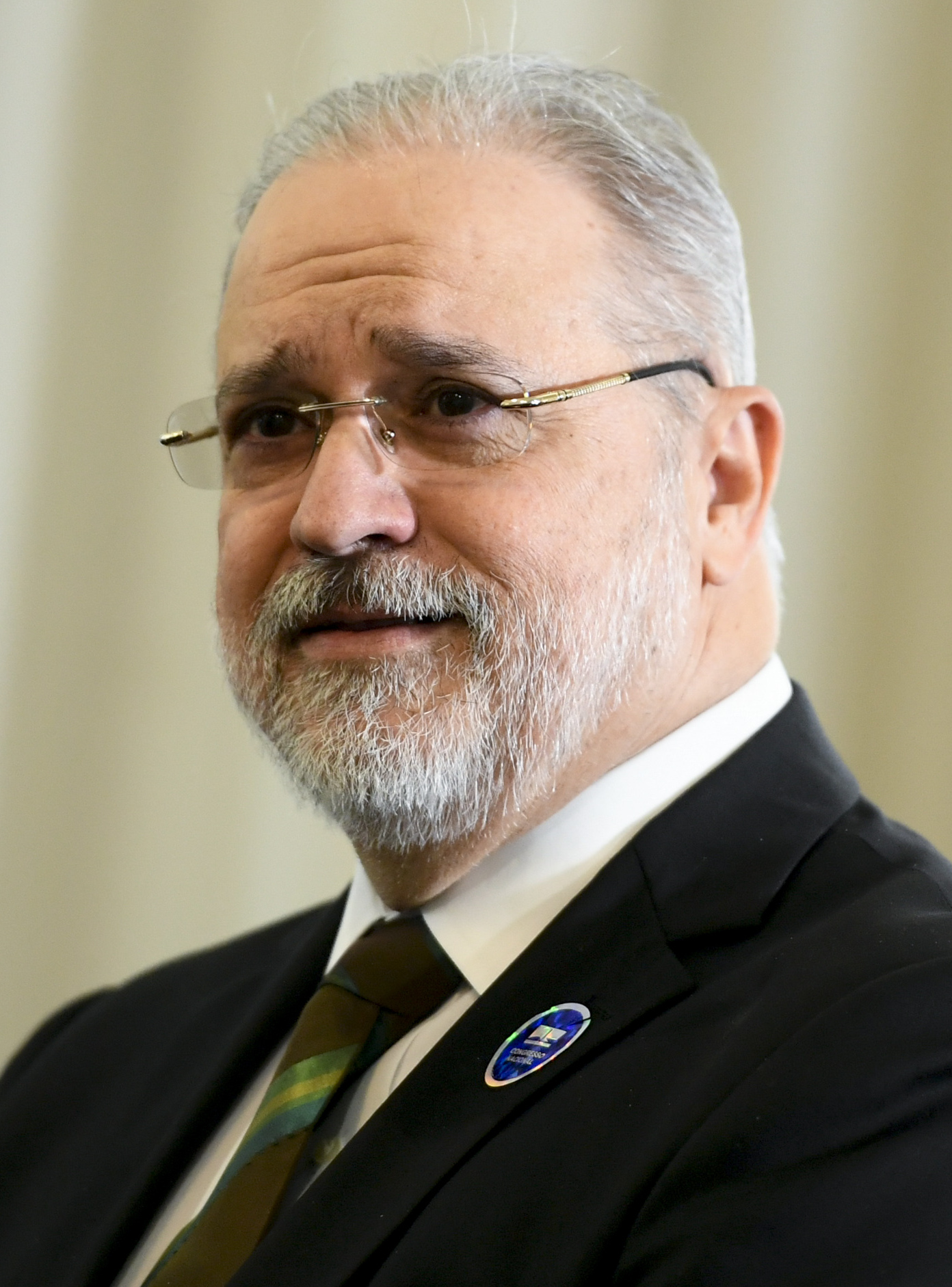
- Aras in 2022

Prosecutor General of the Republic
- In office 26 September 2019 – 26 September 2023
- Appointed by: Jair Bolsonaro
- Preceded by: Raquel Dodge
- Succeeded by: Elizeta Ramos (interim)

Personal details
- Born: Antônio Augusto Brandão de Aras; 4 December 1958 (age 67) Salvador, Bahia, Brazil
- Spouse: Maria das Mercês Gordilho (m. 1992)
- Children: 2 sons; 3 step-daughters
- Education: Catholic University of Salvador (LL.B.); Federal University of Bahia (LL.M.); Pontifical Catholic University of São Paulo (LL.D.)
- Profession: Federal prosecutor

Antônio Augusto Brandão de Aras (born 4 December 1958) is a Brazilian attorney, former sub-Prosecutor-General of Brazil, professor in the Law School of University of Brasília (UnB) and had served as Prosecutor General of Brazil from 2019 to 2023.

He is Bachelor of Laws by the Catholic University of Salvador, Master of Economic Laws by Federal University of Bahia, and Doctor of Constitutional Laws by Pontifical Catholic University of São Paulo. He teaches electoral laws and private laws in UnB. Is a member of the Public Prosecutor's Office since 1987.

On 5 September 2019, he was appointed by President Jair Bolsonaro to be Prosecutor General of Brazil despite not being one of the names in the triple list voted by members of the Public Prosecutor's Office. His name was approved by the Senate on 25 September 2019, and he was sworn in on the 26 September 2019.

== Biography ==
Augusto Aras was born in Salvador, Bahia. When he was a child, his family moved to Feira de Santana, where he concluded his studies. He returned to Salvador to start his graduate classes in the Law School of the Catholic University of Salvador.

In 1987, he was admitted by entrance examination for the Public Prosecutor's Office. Two years later, he joined the teachers' board of the Law School of Federal University of Bahia (UFBA) and is currently a professor at the University of Brasília (UnB), where he teaches electoral law and private law.

In 1992, he married Maria das Mercês de Castro Gordilho, current sub-Prosecutor-General of Brazil. He has 2 sons and 3 step-daughters.

Aras concluded his master's degree in economic laws in UFBA in 2000. In 2005, he concluded his doctor's degree in constitutional laws in Pontifical Catholic University of São Paulo (PUC-SP). His doctor's degree thesis about the adoption of the Partisan Representative Mandate and partisan fidelity were accepted as jurisprudence by the Supreme Federal Court (STF).

== Career ==
=== Acting in the Public Prosecutor's Office ===
Augusto Aras joined the Public Prosecutor's Office in 1987. Acted in the 1st Chamber of Coordination and Review in Constitutional and Infraconstitutional Matter. He was coordinator in the Work Group of Fight Against Electronic Crimes in the 2nd Chamber of Coordination and Review in Criminal Matter. He was also coordinator in the 3rd Chamber of Coordination and Review in Economic and Consumer Matter. Acted in the Institutional Council and in the Superior Council.

He was Electoral Regional Prosecutor of Bahia between 1991 and 1993. Between 2008 and 2010, he represented the MPF in the Administrative Council for Economic Defense (CADE). During his representation, CADE was considered the best anti-trust agency in the Americas, with the official recognition of the MPF participation.

Later, between 2012 and 2013, he was Assistant Corregedor of the MPF. He was General Ombudsman of the MPE in 2013.

=== Other acts ===
He acted, by entrance examination, as National Finances Prosecutor and Legal Auditor in the State Accounts Court of Bahia.

Aras was member of the jurists committee made by the Ministry of Justice for the elaboration of a bill of the new Public Civil Action and participated the jurists committee made by the University of Brasília, Federal Senate, Chamber of Deputies and Federal Council of the Order of Attorneys of Brazil (OAB) for the studies destinated to the Electoral Reform (2009). Besides that, he is peer reviewer of the Presidency of the Republic magazine and the Editorial Council of the Federal Regional Court of the 1st Region magazine.

== Awards and titles ==
- Electoral Merit Diploma, Electoral Regional Court of Bahia (1992).
- Merit Commendation, Electoral Regional Court of Bahia (1992).
- Motion of Honor to Merit no. 1270/93, Legislative Assembly of the State of Bahia (1993).
- Motion of Honor to Merit, Legislative Assembly of Bahia Employees' Association (1997).
- Patron of the I Brazilian Congress of Electoral Law (2008).
- Medal of Honor to Merit in Electoral Law, César Montes Foundation (2010).
- Electoral Merit Diploma, Electoral Regional Court of Federal District (2011).
- Merit Commendation, Electoral Regional Court of Federal District (2011).
- Honor to Merit in Ombudsman Office, National Council of the Public Prosecutor's Office Ombudsmen (2015).
- Thomé de Souza Medal, Municipal Chamber of Salvador (2015).
- Order of the Military Judiciary Merit, Ministry of Defence (2016).
- Order of the Aeronautic, Ministry of Defence (2016).
- High Distinction, Superior Military Court (2016).
- Title of Friend of the Military Police, Military Police of Bahia (2018).

== Publications ==
- Brandão de Aras, Antônio Augusto (26 September 2005). Fidelidade partidária: a perda do mandato parlamentar (Thesis) (in Portuguese). Pontifical Catholic University of São Paulo.
- Aras, Augusto (2010). Fidelidade e Ditadura (Infra) Partidárias (in Portuguese). Edipro. ISBN 978-8572837255.
- Aras, Augusto (2016). Fidelidade Partidária: Efetividade e Aplicabilidade (in Portuguese). GZ Editora. ISBN 9788562027895.
- Aras, Augusto (2018). As candidaturas avulsas à luz da Carta de 88 (in Portuguese). Edição do Autor.

Legal offices
Preceded by Raquel Dodge	Prosecutor General of the Republic; 2019−2023	Succeeded by Elizeta Ramos (interim)
