= José Manuel Maza =

Spanish prosecutor, judge, criminologist and writer

The Most Excellent José Manuel Maza OSRP
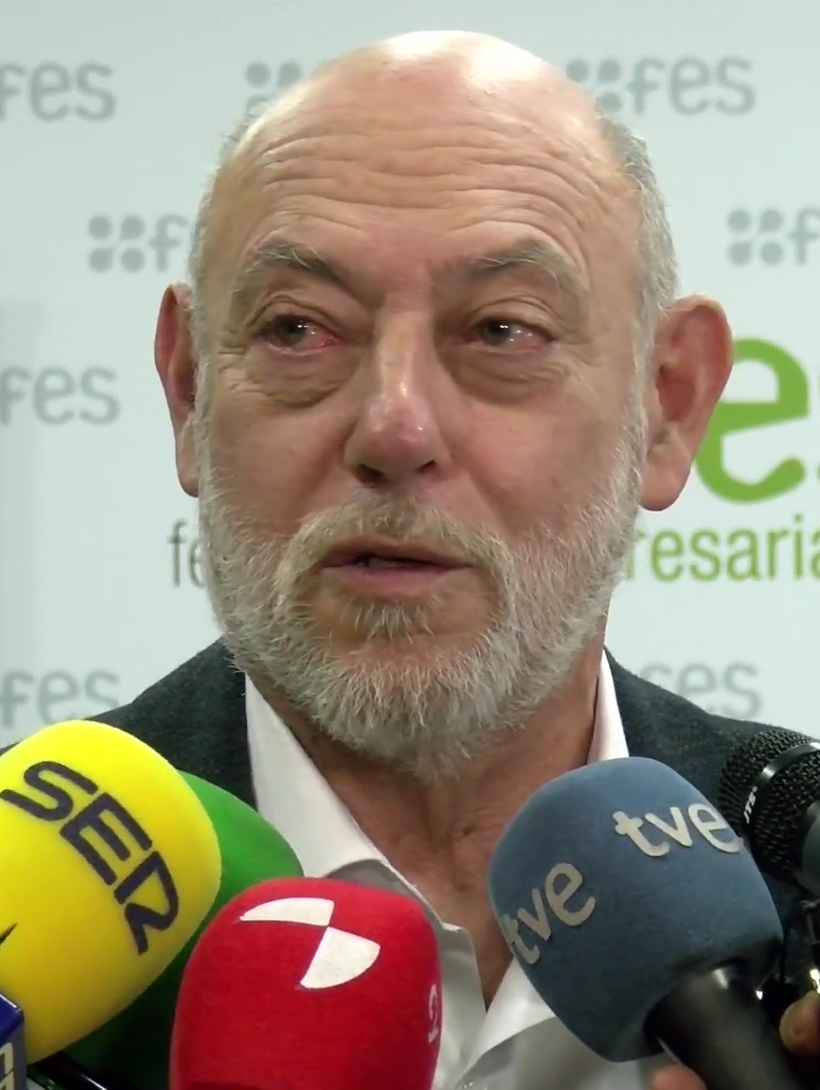
- José Manuel Maza (2017)

Prosecutor General of the State
- In office 25 November 2016 – 18 November 2017
- Preceded by: Consuelo Madrigal
- Succeeded by: Luis Navajas (acting)

Personal details
- Born: 23 October 1951 Madrid, Spain
- Died: 18 November 2017 (aged 66) Buenos Aires, Argentina
- Education: Complutense University of Madrid

José Manuel Maza Martín (23 October 1951 – 18 November 2017) was a Spanish prosecutor, judge, criminologist and writer. He served as the Prosecutor General of the State from November 2016 until his death on 18 November 2017.

== Legal career ==
He studied Law and History in the Complutense University of Madrid. He also got a diploma in Criminology in the same university. He entered the Judicial career in 1975 and in the Prosecutor career in 1978, where he was the first of his promotion. He worked for a few years as a lawyer and as a counsel of the National Railways Network. For a short time, Maza worked as a lawyer, taking on cases for state-owned company Renfe.

During the 1990s, Maza served as the spokesman for the Unión Judicial Independiente (UJI), a conservative association of judges. During this time, Maza became a district judge in Madrid after having worked in the courts of Alcorcón, Valencia and Cangas de Morrazo. He later was appointed chair of the first chamber of the Madrid Provincial Court and, in 2002, he was appointed Magistrate of the Criminal Chamber of the Supreme Court replacing Adolfo Prego, who was appointed member of the CGPJ.

In addition to his daily work as a magistrate, he also authored several books, including the Handbook of Legal and Forensic Psychiatry, Circumstances that exclude or modify Criminal Responsibility and Criminal Penalty Practices, and other publications related to Criminal Law and the relationship between law and medicine.

During his time at the Supreme Court, he worked on many high-profile cases. Maza defended the disqualification of judge Baltasar Garzón, and, in 2007, made it possible to file a case against the former president of the Santander Group, Emilio Botín.

The Council of Ministers nominated Maza as Spain's Prosecutor General in November 2016, a position he held until his death a year later. On 16 May 2017, the Congress of Deputies censured him as Prosecutor General for suspicious activity in the Prosecution Ministry that aimed to obstruct certain cases against corruption. Justice Minister Rafael Catalá and the anti-corruption prosecutor, Manuel Moix, were also reprobated. The latter resigned to his position on 1 June 2017. This reprobation had no binding effects so he continued with his job.

== 2017 Spanish constitutional crisis ==
In September 2017, Maza asked security forces to investigate possible Catalan government preparations to hold an independence voting. He also announced that he would present criminal charges against members of both the regional parliament and government for allowing the referendum. The central government proceeded to deploy a series of legal measures intended to nullify the referendum, while also warning local councils in Catalonia to either impede or paralyse efforts to carry out the vote. On 13 September, he summoned 700 Catalan mayors for their role in the independence referendum.

On 30 October 2017, Maza called for charges of rebellion, sedition and embezzlement against Puigdemont, the Bureau of the Parliament, and other Catalan leaders. It transpired that the ousted President and five of his ministers had fled to Belgium, and some had been jailed.

== Death ==
On 17 November 2017, he was admitted in the Bazterrica Clinic in Buenos Aires for some pain. He died the next day, as a result of a kidney infection complicated by the diabetes he suffered.

== See also ==
- Judiciary of Spain
- 2017 Spanish constitutional crisis
- Operation Anubis
