= Rodrigo Janot =

Brazilian jurist

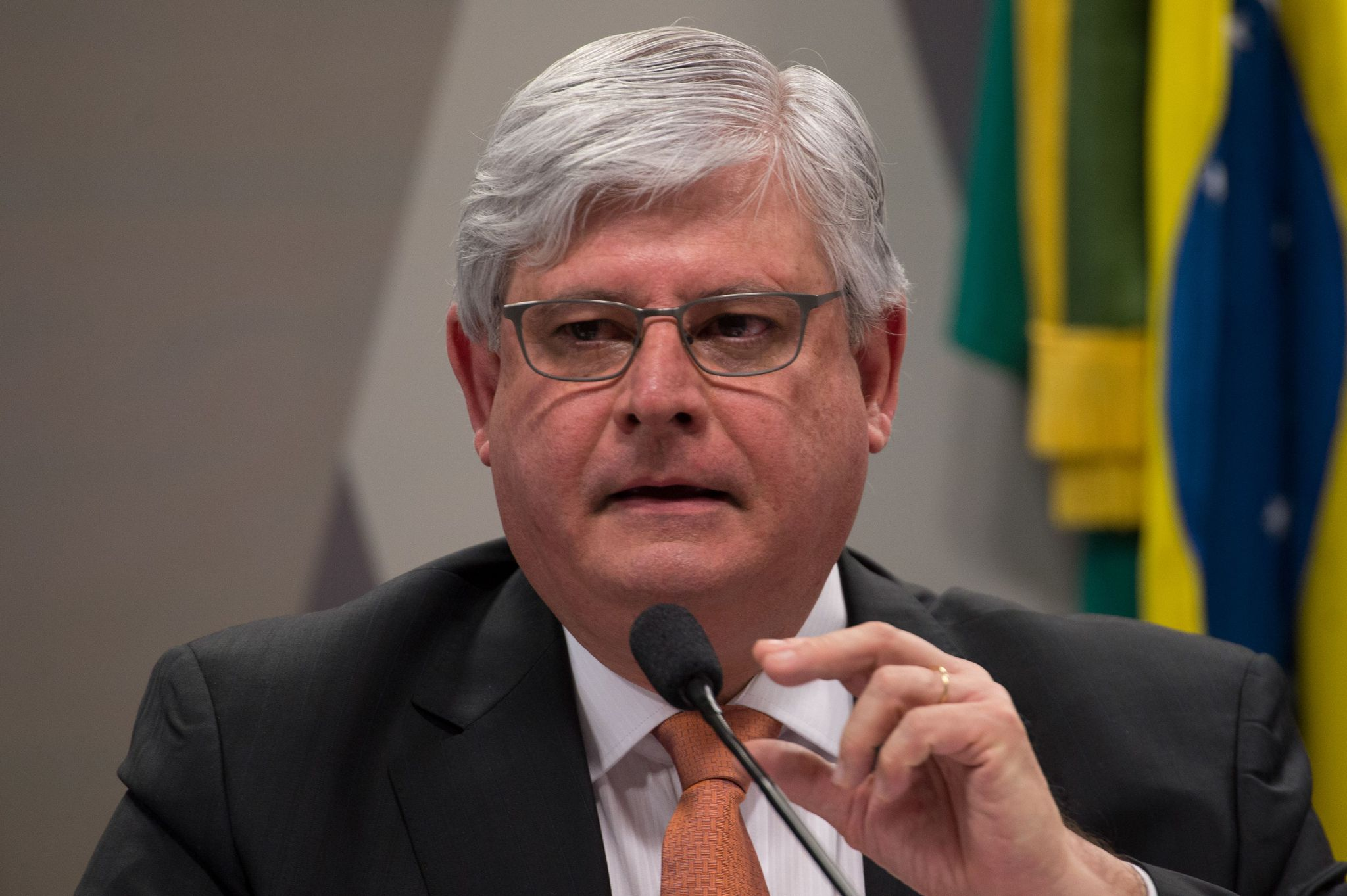

Prosecutor General of the Republic
- In office 17 September 2013 – 18 September 2017
- Nominated by: Dilma Rousseff
- Preceded by: Roberto Gurgel
- Succeeded by: Raquel Dodge

Personal details
- Born: Rodrigo Janot Monteiro de Barros; 15 September 1956 (age 70) Belo Horizonte, Minas Gerais, Brazil
- Education: Federal University of Minas Gerais (LLB, LLM)
- Profession: Prosecutor of the Republic (retired)
- Awards: Order of Rio Branco, Grand Cross
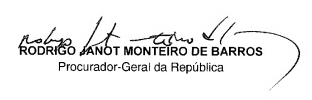
- Signature

Rodrigo Janot Monteiro de Barros (born 15 September 1956, Belo Horizonte) is a Brazilian jurist who served as the Prosecutor General of the Republic from 2013 to 2017.

== Career ==
Rodrigo Janot graduated with an undergraduate degree in law from the Federal University of Minas Gerais in 1979. He completed a specialization in 1985 and master's degree in 1986, from the same university. From 1987 to 1989, he attended a university in Pisa, Italy, called the Scuola Superiore di Studi Universitari e di Perfezionamento Sant'Anna.

Acted as a private attorney from 1980, until 1984, when he joined the Federal Prosecutor's office as a State Prosecutor. He was promoted to Regional Prosecutor in 1993, and Assistant Attorney General for the Republic, in 2003. He was also the General Secretary of the MPF, from 2003 to 2005.

In 2013, he was chosen by President Dilma Rousseff to replace Roberto Gurgel for the top job (Attorney General of the Republic) at the Attorney General's Office, and took office on 17 September 2013.

Attorney Janot won the internal election to return to the role in August 2015. Attorney Janot won the election with more than 300 votes ahead of his second-place competitor. Janot received 288 more votes than in the previous 2013 election.

Legal offices
Preceded by Roberto Gurgel	Prosecutor General of the Republic; 2013–2017	Succeeded by Raquel Dodge
