= High Court of Justice of Andalusia, Ceuta and Melilla =

Coordinates: 37.1773°N 3.5957°W

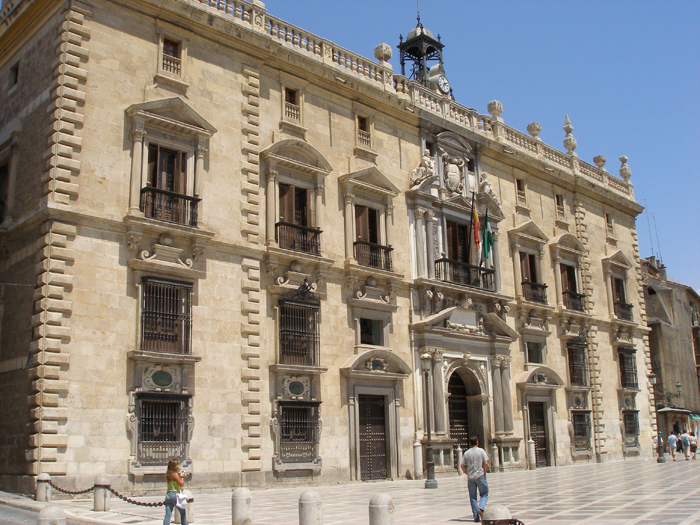
Seat of the High Court of Andalusia, in Granada.

The High Court of Justice of Andalusia, Ceuta and Melilla (Spanish: Tribunal Superior de Justicia de Andalucía, Ceuta y Melilla, TSJA), is the highest court of Andalusia, and for the Spanish autonomous cities of Ceuta and Melilla. Its seat is the former Royal Chancery of Granada. The TSJA has full power over all the jurisdictional orders: civil and penal law, social law, administrative disputes, and any other orders that may be created in the future.

The TSJA is the final jurisdictional court of all trials initiated in the autonomous community of Andalusia and the autonomous cities of Ceuta and Melilla, and is the final appeal court for all legal processes that occur in those areas, whatever law is invoked as applicable, in accord with the Organic Law of Judicial Power and without prejudice to the powers reserved to the Supreme Court.

== History of the High Court ==
The TSJA was created as provided for in Article 7 of the original (1981) Statute of Autonomy of Andalusia. In the first ordinary session of the Parliament of Andalusia, Granada was chosen as the seat of the TSJA, making that city the judicial capital of Andalusia; Seville is the political capital.

The TSJA was constituted in 1989. This superseded the old Audiencias Territoriales and gave rise to a new judicial model adapted to the requirements of the Spanish Constitution of 1978 and the Statutes of Autonomy of the various autonomous communities. The new territorial model and the new model of judicial power made it necessary to replace the two old courts—seated in Granada and Seville, respectively—with a single court for the whole of Andalusia, Ceuta, and Melilla, as well as the creation of the Divisions (Salas) of Civil and Penal Law and the Division of Social Law, to which new powers were attributed. The new court was not considered as having continuity from the previous Audiencia Territorial; it was an entirely new creation. It does not consider the decisions of that court as precedents.

Owing in part to the judicial history of Seville, two displaced divisions (Salas desplazadas) were created in that city: a Division of Administrative Disputes (Contencioso-Administrativo) and a Division of Social Law. Because of the importance of the city of Málaga and the large volume of cases generated in the surrounding province of Málaga, despite the city having no prior history as the seat of a judicial institution, two salas were created as in Seville. Both of these also have equivalents in Granada.

In 1997 the Andalusian Autonomous Government transferred material and human resources to the TSJA, permitting the latter to gain more institutional importance within Andalusia. This occurred in part because of a series of agreements increasing cooperation between the Andalusian Autonomous Government and the General Council of the Judiciary.

On 17 June 1999 it was celebrated the tenth anniversary of the High Court of Andalusia, Ceuta and Melilla, with the presence and involvement of the president of the Supreme Court and of the General Council of the Judiciary, the president of the Andalusian Regional Government, the president of the Parliament of Andalusia and the president of the court itself.

== History of the seat of the TSJA in Granada ==
The seat of the high court is the former Royal Chancery of Granada. From 1505 to 1834, the Royal Chancery had jurisdiction over the Kingdom of Granada, over the three kingdoms that then made up Andalusia (Seville, Córdoba, and Jaén, as well as the Kingdom of Murcia, La Mancha, certain provinces of Extremadura, and the Canary Islands. The oldest parts of the present building were built around 1531. The present façade and staircase date from slightly later, during the reign of King Philip II; the façade was completed in 1587. The building contains numerous sculptures and paintings from roughly that era, as well is ironwork, tapestries, and so forth. In 1762 a stone balustrade was added to the cornice, with carved pyramids and a 16th-century clock in the center. That clock used to be in an interior staircase; its old place was filled in 1806 by a marble medallion with the figure of King Charles III.

In 1834, the status of the Chancery was reduced to that of an Audiencia, with jurisdiction over the provinces of Granada, Almería, Jaén and Málaga.

== Powers ==
As remarked above, the TSJA is the highest court in Andalusia, Ceuta, and Melilla, subject only to the powers reserved for the Supreme Court of Spain. More specifically, the TSJA fulfills several roles, corresponding to its various divisions (salas).

The Divisions of Civil and Penal law (Sala de lo Civil and Sala de lo Penal) has jurisdiction over charges under civil or criminal law against civil officials and magistrates related to the execution of their offices, except insofar as the Statute of Autonomy assigns certain jurisdiction to the Supreme Court. It also is the court with jurisdiction in disputes between courts in the autonomous community that do not have any other common superior court. The Division of Administrative Disputes (Sala de lo Contencioso Administrativo) has broad appellate powers and power to review administrative actions by government entities. The Division of Social law (Sala de lo Social) deals specifically with labor law.

== Presidency of the TSJA ==
(Spain) Presidents of the High Court of Andalusia
President	From	To
Andrés Márquez Aranda	1989-05-23	1991-03-12
Juan Ignacio Pérez Alférez	1991-06-04	1992-06-05
Manuel Rodríguez López	1992-07-20	1995-05-30
Augusto Méndez de Lugo	1995-06-08	present
Source: Tribunal Superior de Justicia de Andalucía, official page
