= Order of Saint Raymond of Peñafort =

Order of St. Raymond of Peñafort Orden de San Raimundo de Peñafort
- Star of the Order

Awarded by the Spanish Monarch
- Type: Order of Merit
- Established: 1944; 81 years ago
- Royal house: House of Bourbon-Spain
- Awarded for: Recognition of activities in the fields of law and jurisprudence.
- Status: Currently Constituted
- Chancellor: Pilar Llop, Minister of Justice
- Grades: Grand-Cross; Cross of Honour; Distinguished Cross 1st Class; Distinguished Cross 2nd Class; Single Cross; Gold Medal of Merit in Justice; Silver Medal of Merit in Justice; Bronze Medal of Merit in Justice

Precedence
- Next (higher): Civil Order of Alfonso X, the Wise
- Next (lower): Order of Constitutional Merit
- Ribbon of the Order, Grand Cross right.

The Order of the Cross of St. Raymond of Peñafort (Spanish: Orden de la Cruz de San Raimundo de Peñafort) is a Spanish civil order of merit. Established 23 January 1944, the five classes recognize service to and contributions toward the development and perfection of the law and jurisprudence. The three medals of the order recognize years of unblemished service within the legal and administrative professions under the jurisdiction of the Ministry of Justice. The order is named for St. Raymond of Penyafort, the patron saint of lawyers.

== Classes ==
=== Crosses ===
The five classes of crosses of the Order of St. Raymond of Peñafort may be awarded to civil servants involved in justice administration; professionals working directly in the field of justice; those who have contributed to the development of law, the study of the Canon law, and the legislative and organisational work for the state; authors of legal publications deemed to be of relevant importance; and the founders and members of bodies and institutions devoted to the improvement of law and jurisprudence. The classes are as follows:

- Grand-Cross (Gran Cruz)
- Cross of Honour (Cruz de Honor)
- Distinguished Cross First Class (Cruz Distinguida de Primera Clase)
- Distinguished Cross Second Class (Cruz Distinguida de Segunda Clase)
- Single Cross (Cruz Sencilla)

=== Medals ===
The medals of the Order of St. Raymond of Peñafort are awarded to legal and administrative professionals working under the jurisdiction of the Ministry of Justice. The medals honour years of unblemished service. The classes are as follows:

- Gold Medal of Merit in Justice (Medalla de Oro del Mérito a la Justicia)
- Silver Medal of Merit in Justice (Medalla de Plata del Mérito a la Justicia)
- Bronze Medal of Merit in Justice (Medalla de Bronce del Mérito a la Justicia)
