= Cándido Conde-Pumpido =

Spanish judge

The Most Excellent Cándido Conde-Pumpido
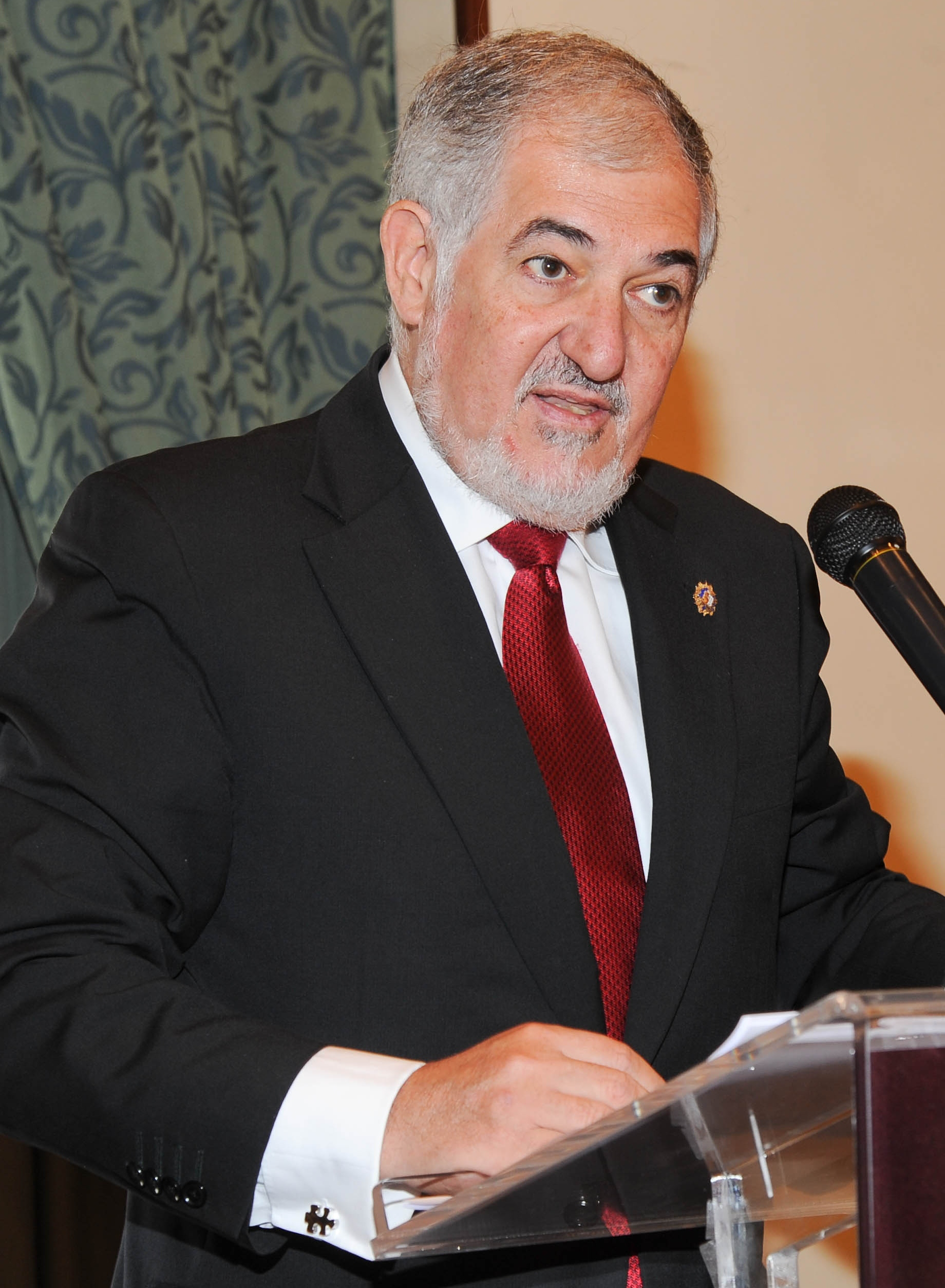

President of the Constitutional Court
- Incumbent
- Assumed office January 12, 2023
- Preceded by: Pedro González-Trevijano

Magistrate of the Constitutional Court
- Incumbent
- Assumed office March 15, 2017

Prosecutor General of the State
- In office April 24, 2004 – December 17, 2011
- Nominated by: Jose Luis Rodriguez Zapatero
- Preceded by: Jesús Cardenal
- Succeeded by: Eduardo Torres-Dulce

Personal details
- Born: September 22, 1949 (age 76) La Coruña, Spain
- Education: University of Santiago de Compostela

Cándido Conde-Pumpido Tourón (born September 22, 1949) is a Spanish judge who has served as President of the Constitutional Court since January 2023.

Conde-Pumpido previously served as Magistrate of the Supreme Court from 1995 to 2017, year in which he was proposed by the Spanish Senate as Magistrate of the Constitutional Court. He also served as Prosecutor General of the State from 2004 to 2011.

== Personal life ==
Conde-Pumpido was born in La Coruña, a city and municipality of Galicia, Spain. His father was also a Prosecutor. He graduated from the University of Santiago de Compostela and received his J.D. in Law and Economics in 1971. He worked as a Judge in San Sebastián and Segovia for twenty years. He played an active role on the board of directors for the Judges for Democracy Association.

Conde-Pumpido was nominated to the Supreme Court of Spain in 1995. The Supreme Court of Spain (Spanish: Tribunal Supremo) is the highest court in Spain for all matters not pertaining to the Spanish Constitution. The court, which meets in the Convent of the Salesas Reales in Madrid, consists of a president and an indeterminate number of magistrates appointed to the five chambers of the court.

In 2004, Conde-Pumpido was appointed Prosecutor General by the King Juan Carlos I, on the advice from the Government of prime minister Rodriguez Zapatero, after receiving the opinion of the General Council of the Judiciary, and he was the Spanish AG from 2004 to 2011. Now he came back to the Supreme Court of Spain.

He has written many papers, including "National prosecution authorities and criminal justice system: the challenges ahead". ERA Forum, NL, 2009.

== Prosecutor general ==
He was appointed by the King of Spain, on a proposal from the Government, after receiving the favorable opinion of the General Council of the Judiciary (CGPJ). He served as such from April 24, 2004, to December 17, 2011.

=== President of the European network of General Prosecutor near the Supreme courts ===
Jean-Louis Nadal, Prosecutor General at the Court of Cassation in Paris, strongly backed by Conde-Pumpido, created in 2009 the European Network of General Prosecutor near the Supreme Courts, in which Nadal was the first president. In May 2009, Conde-Pumpido was elected, in Praga, as president of the network.

=== President of the Ibero-American Association of Public Prosecutors ===
In October 2007, in the XV Assembly held in Madrid, Conde-Pumpido was elected to assume the Presidency of the Ibero-American Association of Public Prosecutors (AIAMP).

=== Antiterror effort ===
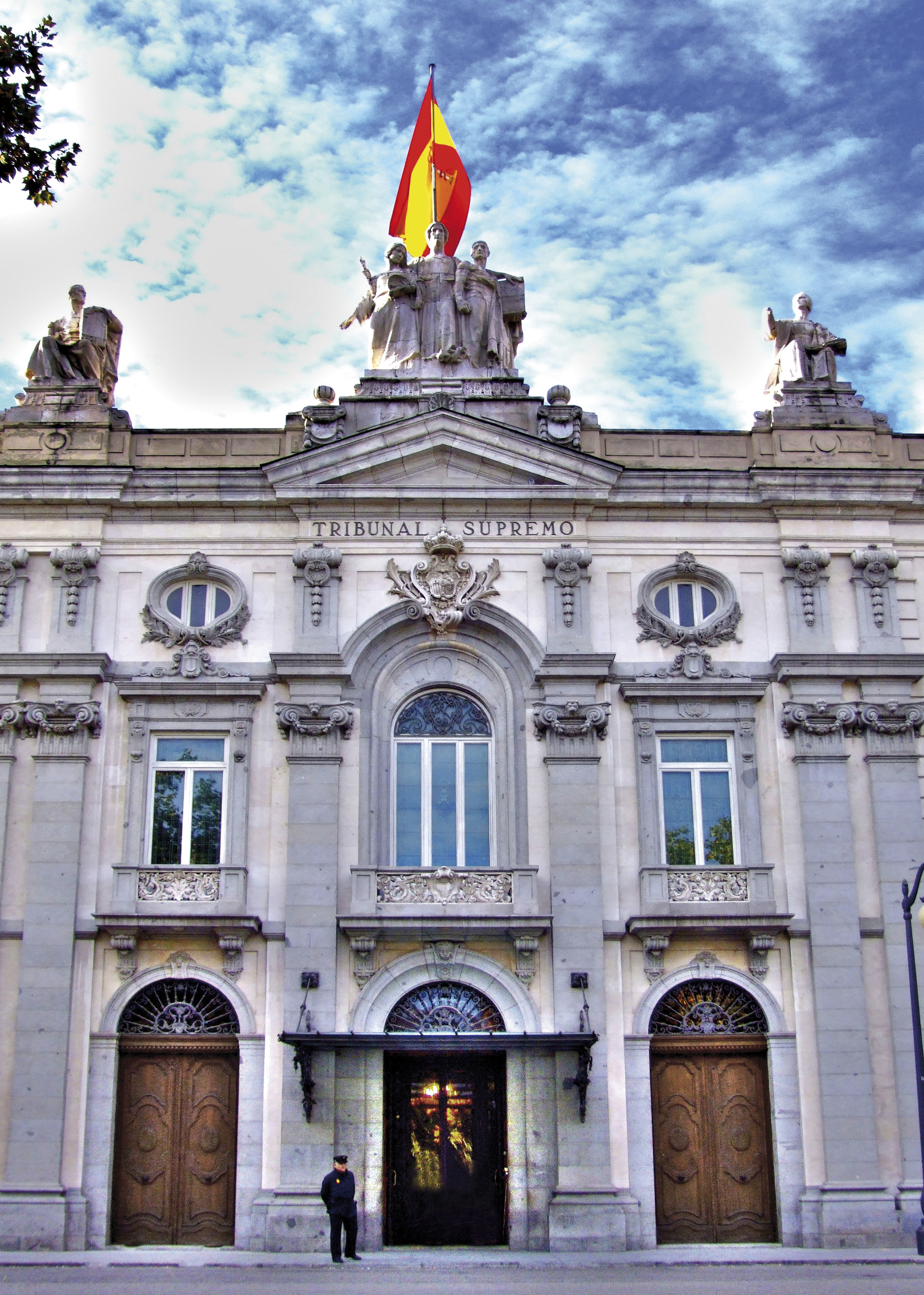
Supreme Court of Spain

Conde-Pumpido reinforced the activity of the Prosecutor of the national hearing against Islamist terrorism as a response to the attack of March 11, 2004, in Madrid, increasing its workforce, creating a group of specialized prosecutors and fostering international cooperation to share information, getting the trial for the massacre should be held within a reasonable time and with damning of most of the defendants result. At the same time, he advocated and put into practice a preventive criminal policy to Act police and judicially against the commands in training until they were able to cause damage, that improved police efficiency and produced a result positive to prevent further Islamist attacks in Spain throughout its mandate.

Conde-Pumpido also launched a U.S.-Spain Bilateral Counter Terrorism Experts Working Group, with prosecutor-to-prosecutor dialogues on Counter Terrorism issues. The U.S.-Spain Bilateral CT Experts Working Group was founded in March 2005 on the first anniversary of the Madrid train bombings. The January 12–13, 2010 meeting marked the first time that Organised Crime was on the agenda.

On April 17, 2009, Spain's prosecutor general, Candido Conde-Pumpido, said his office would not support Judge Baltasar Garzon's outrageous effort to prosecute Bush six Administration officials for their role in the US antiterror effort. Spain's AG said any such prosecution would turn his nation's National Court "into a plaything" for politics.

=== The European Public Prosecutor strongly backed by Conde-Pumpido ===
Following the attacks on the eurozone by speculators in 2009–10, Spain proposed the EU enact the European Public Prosecutor provision so the post could co-ordinate legal action in retaliation. "Spain wants the European Union to use a planned public prosecutor's office for the region to protect the euro currency against speculators", Spanish prosecutor general Cándido Conde-Pumpido said in March 2010.

=== Agreement to strengthen U.S.-Spanish cooperation ===
On April 8, 2010, in Madrid, US Attorney General Eric Holder signed an Agreement to strengthen U.S.-Spanish Cooperation with Conde-Pumpido. Holder met with Conde-Pumpido to discuss the many ways in which the United States and Spain can continue the partnership already established in counterterrorism, counternarcotics, money laundering, smuggling or combating international organized crime.

=== United States diplomatic cables leak ===
On November 28, 2010, WikiLeaks and five major newspapers from Spain (El País), France (Le Monde), Germany (Der Spiegel), the United Kingdom (The Guardian), and the United States (The New York Times) started simultaneously to publish the first 220 of 251,287 leaked confidential.

According to the United States diplomatic cables released by WikiLeaks, U.S. officials tried to pressure Spain into dropping court investigations into the Central Intelligence Agency's extraordinary rendition, torture at Guantanamo Bay detention camp, and the 2003 killing of José Couso, a Spanish journalist, in Iraq by American troops. Politicians such as the former Deputy Prime Minister María Teresa Fernández de la Vega, the former Minister of Foreign Affairs Miguel Ángel Moratinos and Prosecutor General Cándido Conde-Pumpido, among others, were pressured by U.S. officials.

Conde-Pumpido strongly denied the version of Ambassador Aguirre contained in the cables.

== Magistrate of the Constitutional Court ==
In 2017, the Senate proposed Conde-Pumpido as one of its candidates to assume a position within the Constitutional Court. He was appointed by the Monarch on March 15, 2017.

The initial proposal was made by the regional Assembly of Madrid, given that the Magistrates of the Constitutional Court appointed by the Senate are chosen from among those proposed by the parliaments of the Spanish regions.

He was elected president of the Court in January 2023. Before his election as president, he was considered the unofficial candidate of the so-called "progressive" sector of the Constitutional Court.
