= Electoral Commission of Catalonia =

- Formation: 2017
- Dissolved: September 22, 2017; 8 years ago
- Headquarters: Barcelona
- Region served: Catalonia
- Services: Overseesing elections

The Electoral Commission of Catalonia (Catalan: Sindicatura Electoral de Catalunya) was the electoral commission for the independence referendum, guaranteeing the transparency and objectivity of the electoral process and the effective exercise of electoral rights. It is based in Parliament of Catalonia. On September 21, 2017, the Constitutional Court of Spain imposed daily fines of 12,000 euros for each member of the commission, and 6,000 euros for each territorial trustee. On September 22, 2017, the Commission dissolved itself.

== Composition ==
It was a permanent body made up of five members, either jurists or political scientists, experts in electoral processes, appointed by an absolute majority of the Parliament of Catalonia at the proposal of the parties, federations, coalitions or voter groupings with representation in the Parliament of Catalonia.
