= 2017 demonstration against Catalan independence =

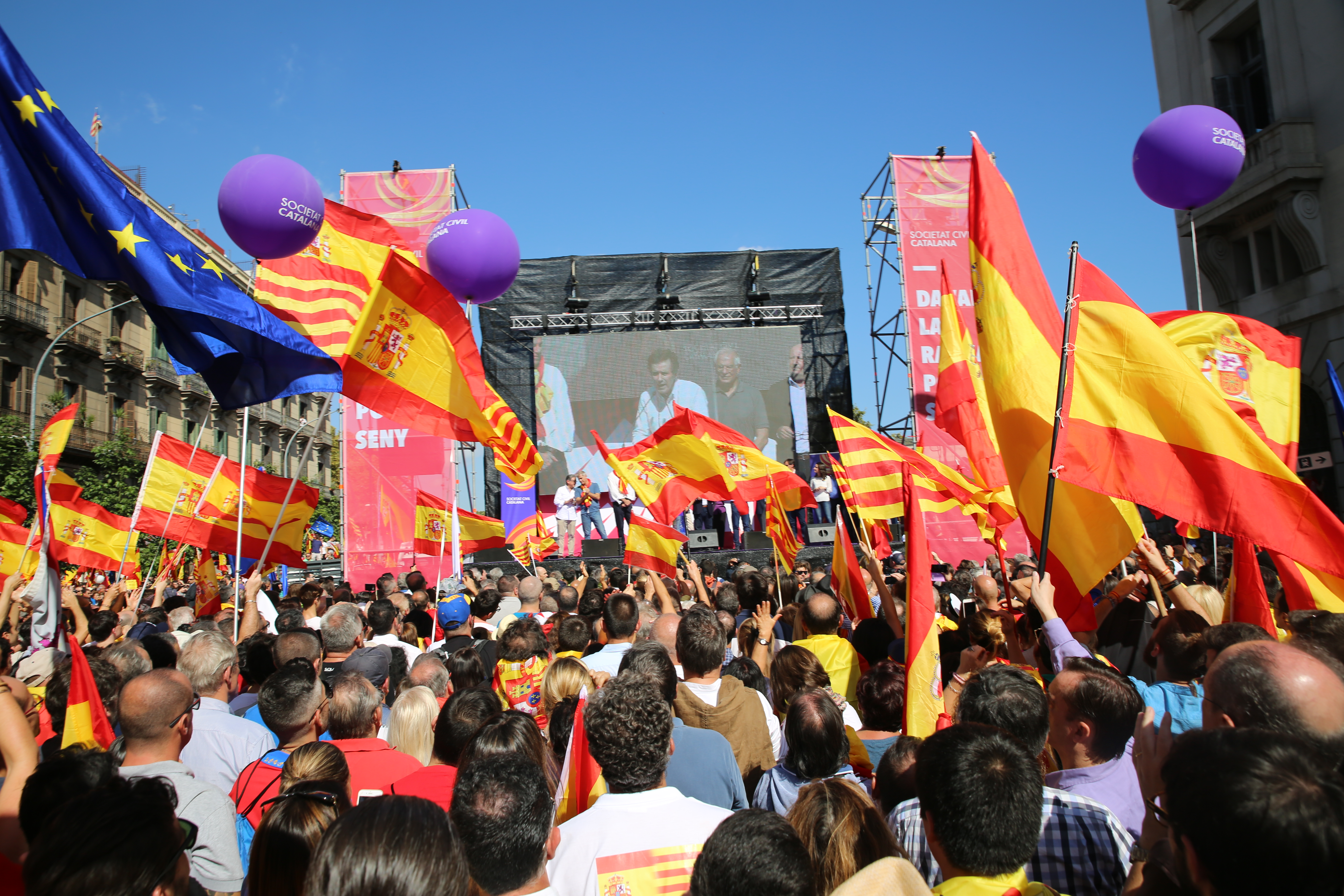
- View of the demonstration in Plaça Urquinaona, Barcelona.
- Date: 8 October 2017
- Location: Barcelona, Catalonia, Spain; 41.3854°N 2.1767°E
- Caused by: Passing of unconstitutional laws to create a new legal framework outside of Spain, holding of an illegal referendum on self-determination, announced declaration of independence of Catalonia.
- Goals: protest Catalan separatism
- Methods: Protest march, street protest

The 2017 demonstration against Catalan independence was a large demonstration in Barcelona, Spain, organized by Societat Civil Catalana on 8 October 2017, usually named after its slogan 'Stop! let's come to our senses' (in Catalan 'Prou! Recuperem el Seny'). It took place around midday starting in Plaça Urquinaona and ending in França railway station. The objective of the rally was to voice protests and growing concerns about the accelerating Catalan independence movement and the recent referendum on self-determination as well as to call for the preserved unity of Spain. The number of demonstrators was estimated at 950,000 by the organizers and 350.000 by the local police.

== Demonstration ==
The initial announcement was made by the entity Societat Civil Catalana, asking the 'silenced' Catalonia to demonstrate and say 'enough' to the Catalan independence movement. The aim of the organizers was to assemble the largest pro-unity rally in the history of Barcelona with the aim of making clear that a large part of society was feeling abused by the nationalist movement.

Later, political parties decided to participate asking their supporters to join. This included the People's Party, Citizens, and the Socialists' Party of Catalonia, as well as then minority parties UPyD and Vox.

It was explicitly asked of demonstrators to join in a civic and peaceful way with a constructive attitude, and they were encouraged to bring Catalan, Spanish and European flags to show the plurality of the pro-union supporters. No unconstitutional symbols were tolerated.

The march was led by the Minister of Health Dolors Montserrat, the Delegate of the Government in Catalonia Enric Millo, Nobel Prize in Literature laureate Mario Vargas Llosa, the former president of the European Parliament Josep Borrell and anti-corruption public prosecutor Carlos Jiménez Villarejo.

== Aftermath ==
The success of the demonstration surpassed the expectations of the organizers, as until that point the pro-independence movement had had a monopoly in organizing massive public demonstrations. This is reflected in the slogan the streets will always be ours (els carrers seran sempre nostres), commonly used in pro-independence rallies. As a result, the rally is considered a turning point in the public perception of the political conflict, being extensively featured in the international press.

== Gallery ==
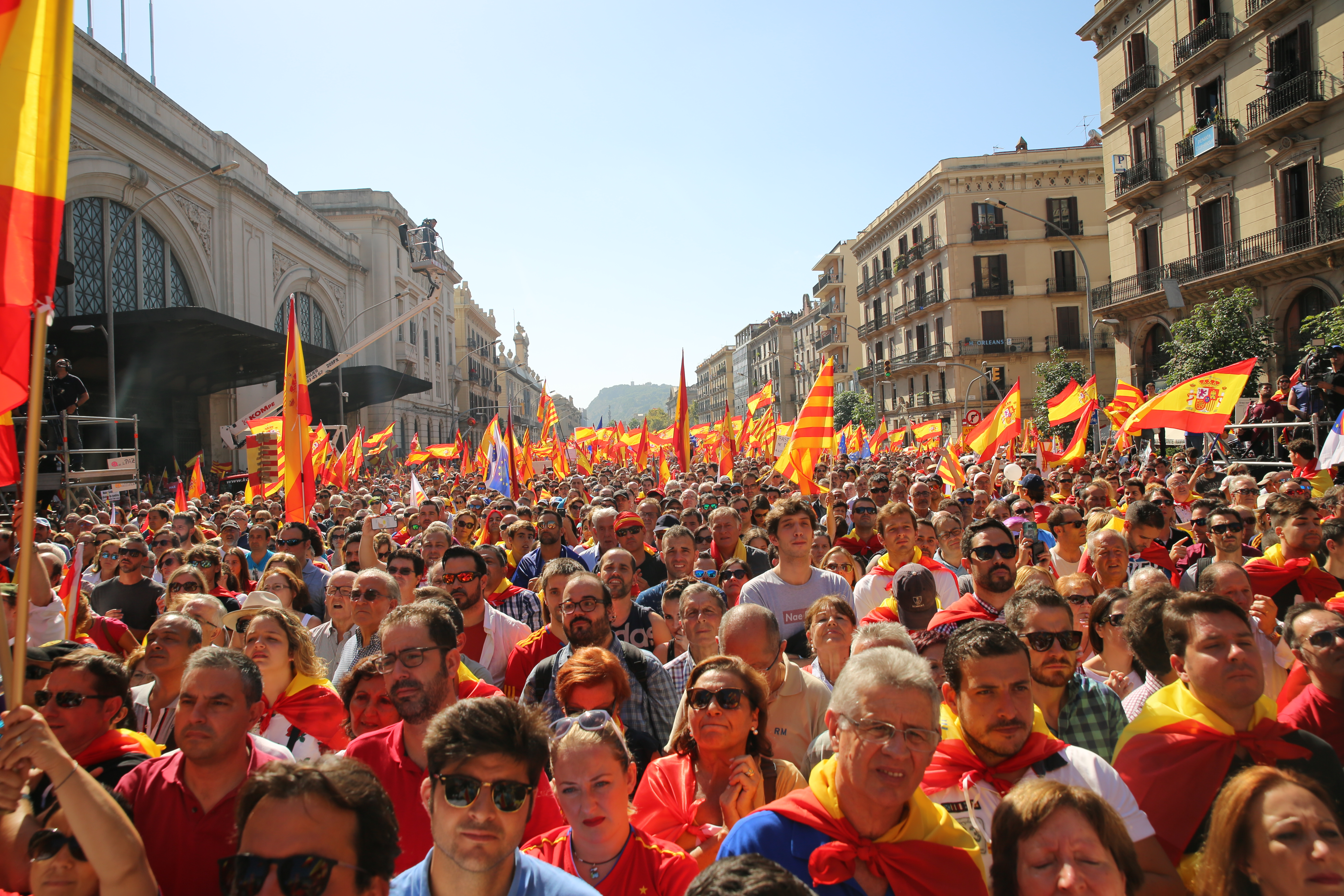

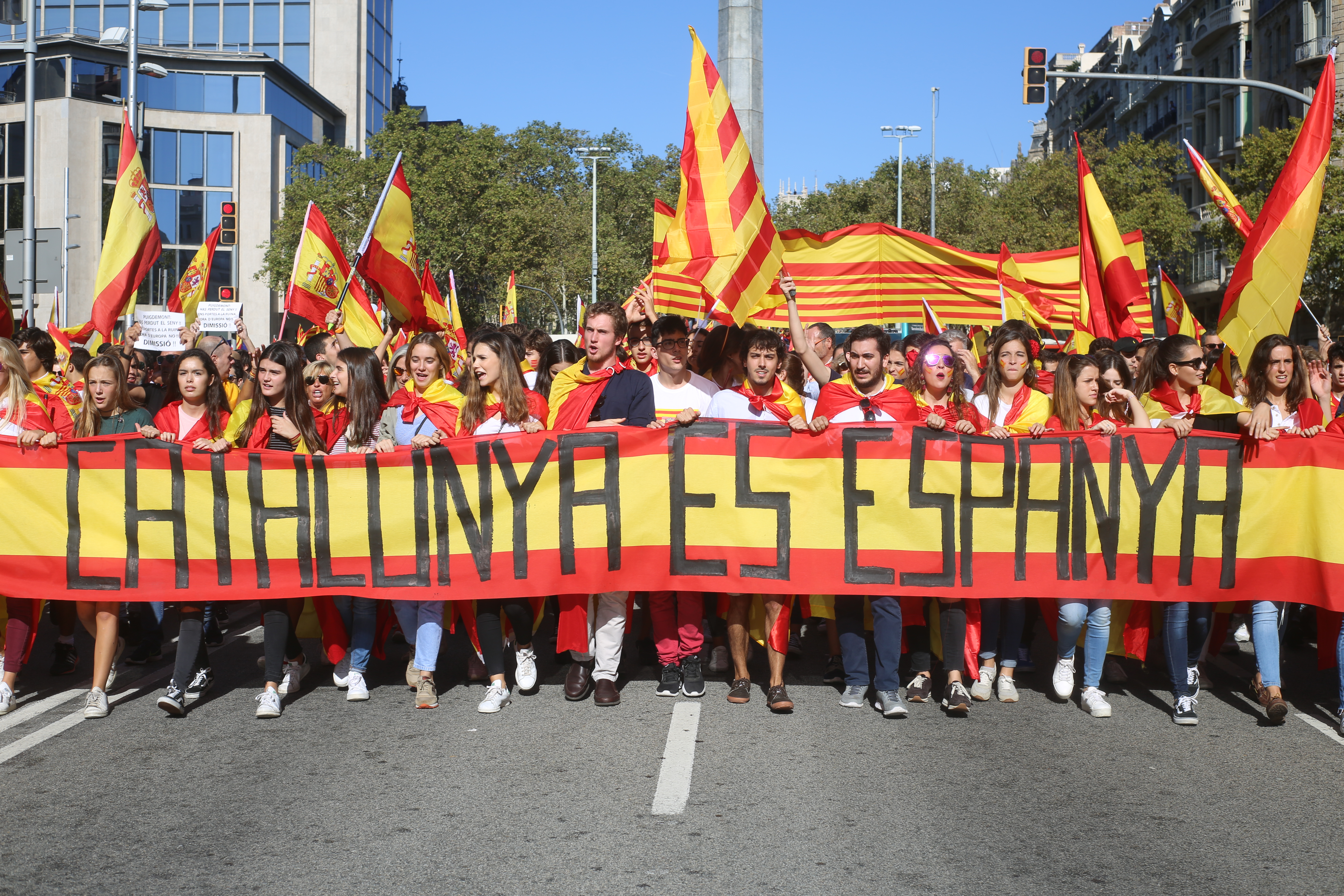

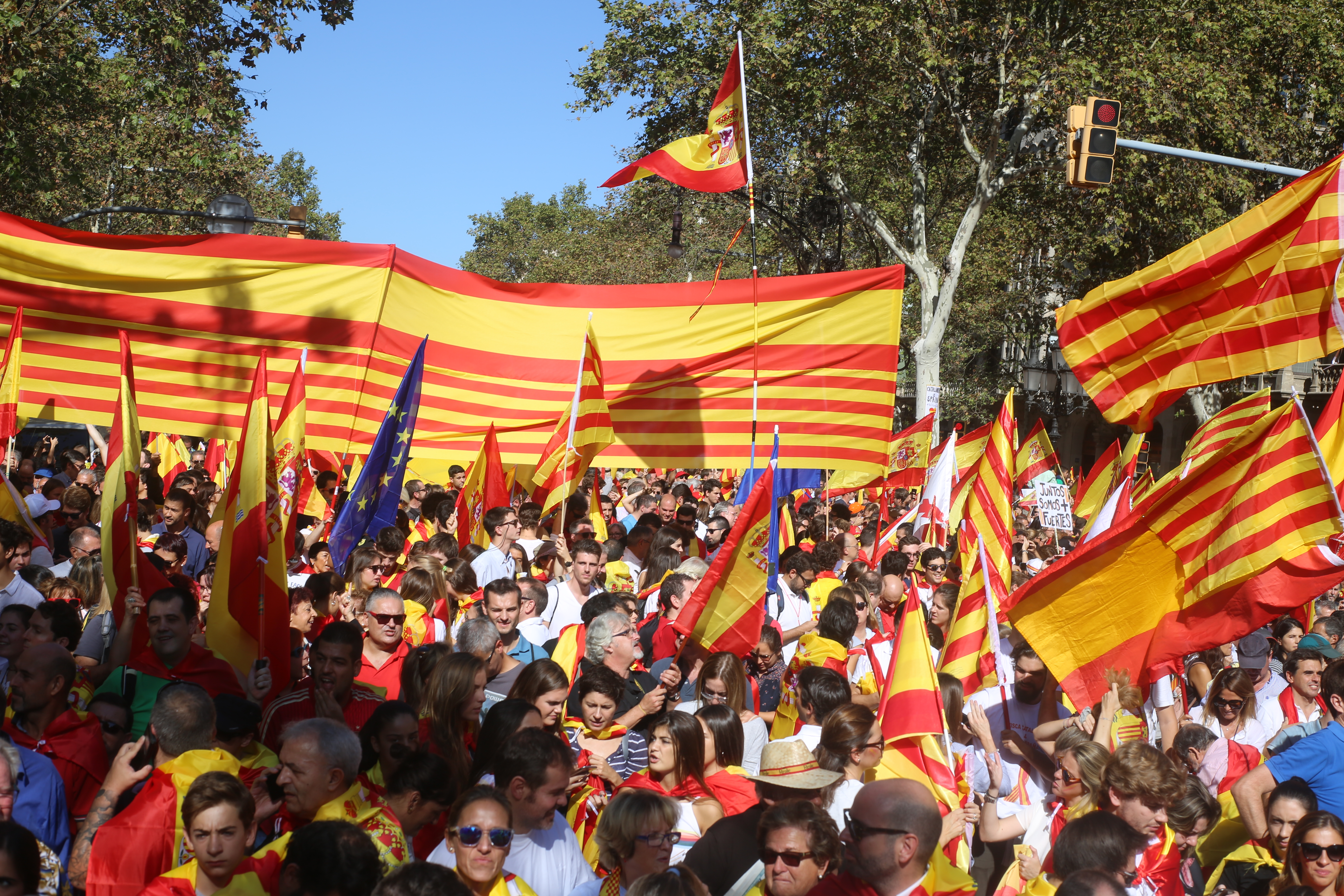

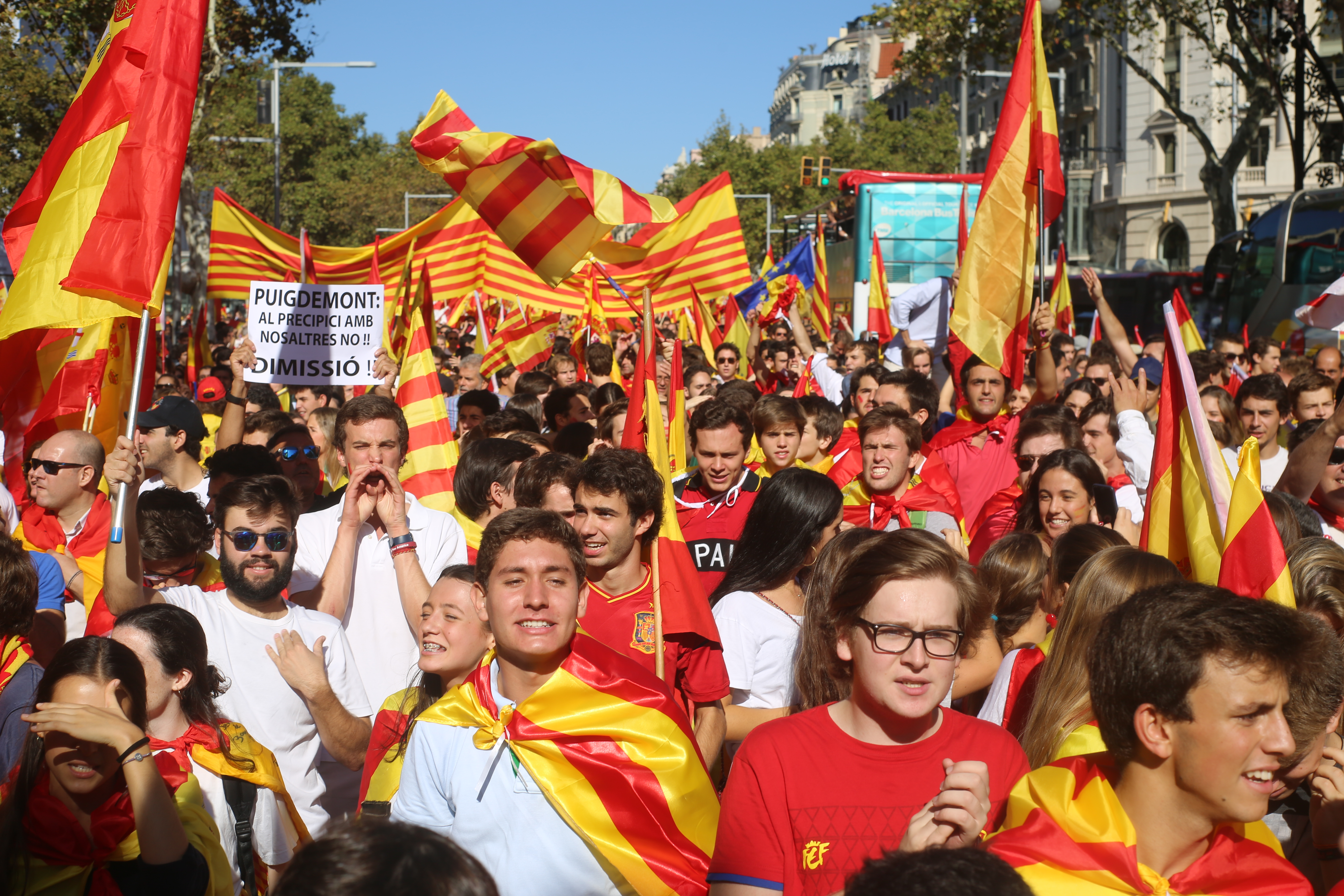

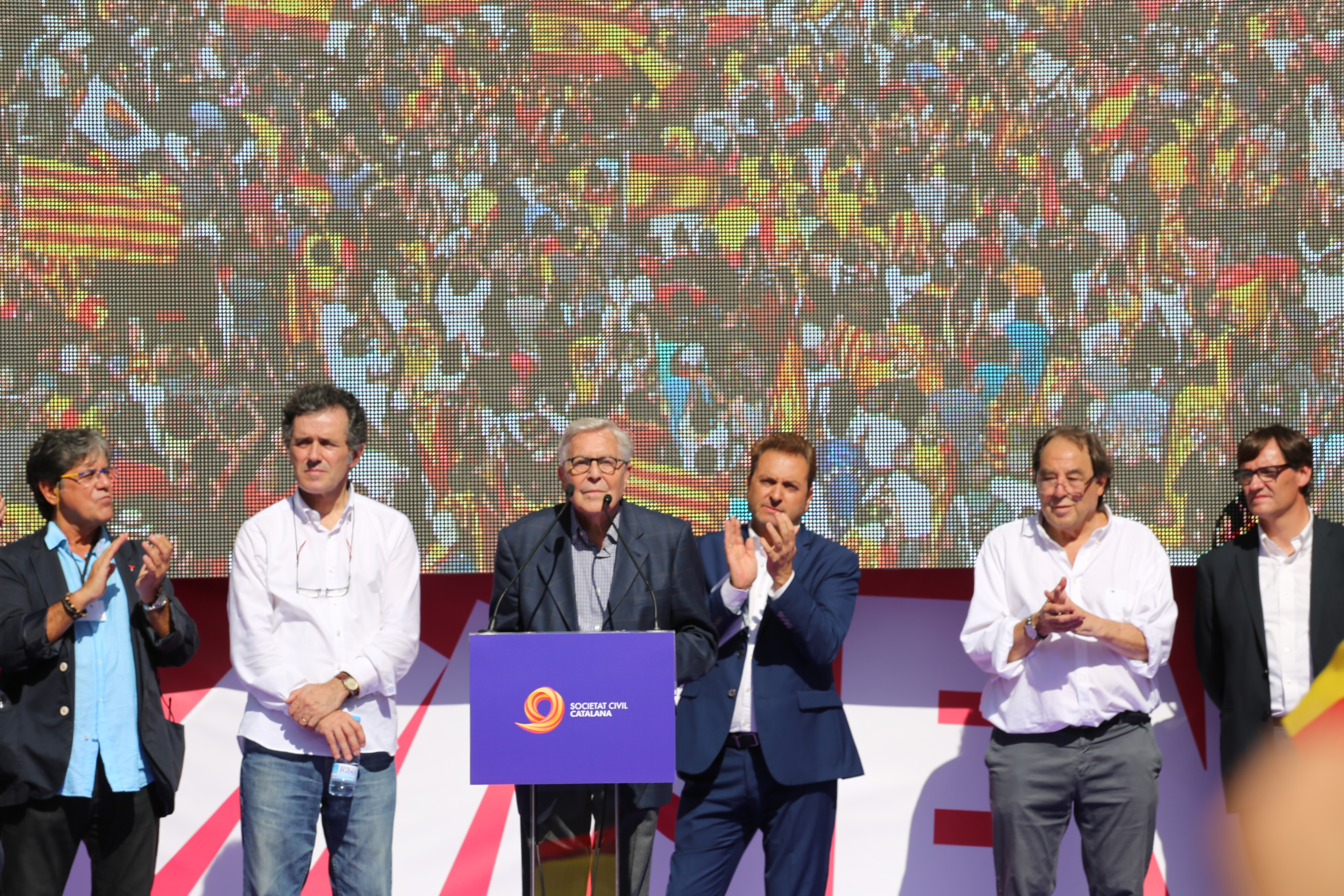

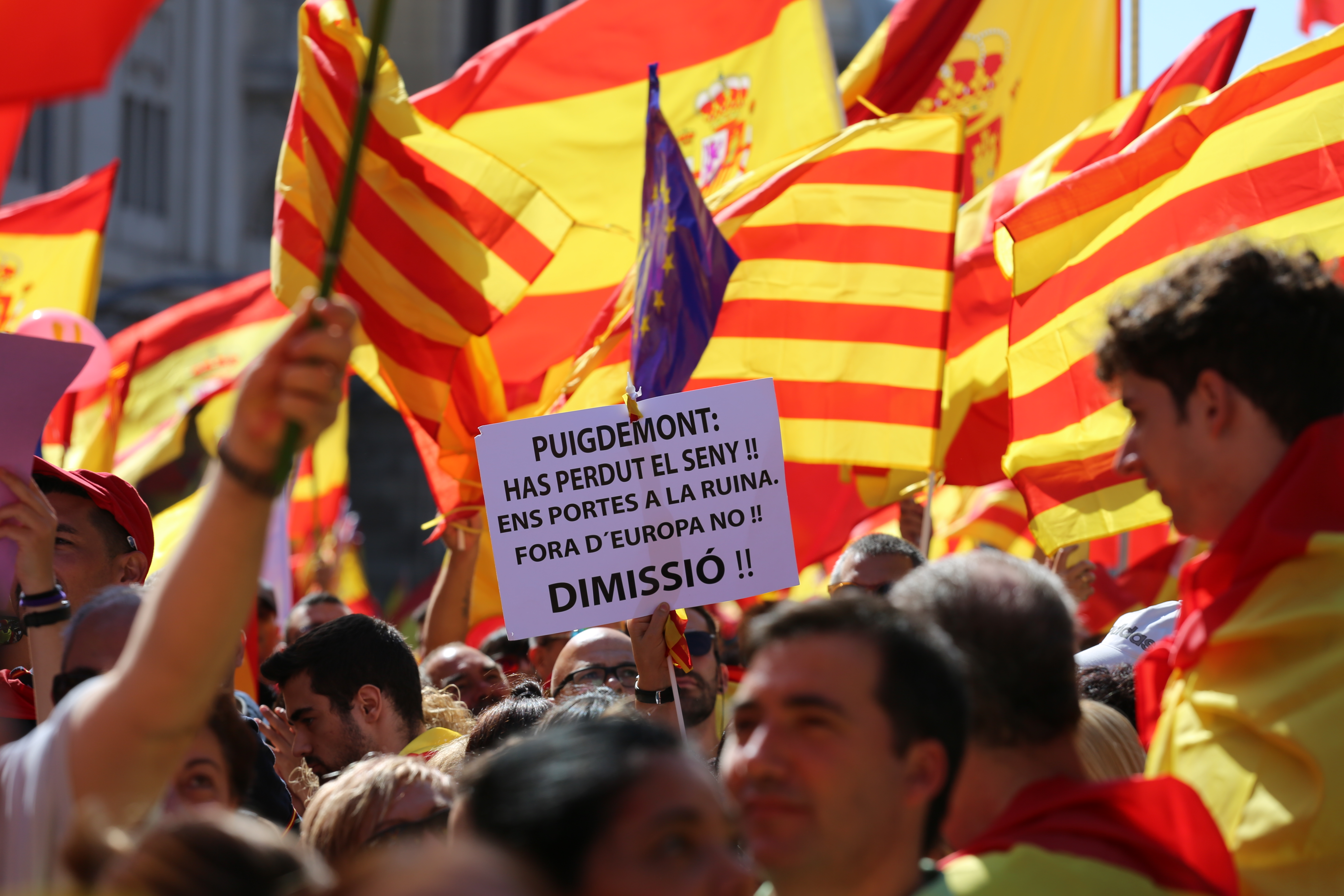

== See also ==
- 2017 Catalan independence referendum
- 2017–2018 Spanish constitutional crisis
