= Helena Catt =

UK-born New Zealand public servant

Dr. Helena Catt
- Born: United Kingdom
- Education: London School of Economics, Edinburgh University
- Scientific career
- Fields: Electoral law, democracy, voting patterns
- Workplaces: New Zealand Electoral Commission, Auckland University

Helena Catt, from the UK, was a New Zealand public servant and is an expert in electoral practice. She was the first female chief executive of the New Zealand Electoral Commission from 2004 to 2009 and was a professor in the Department of Political Studies, University of Auckland.

She was also part of the New Zealand Productivity Commission and during her tenure had a series of publications including "Are Commissions Representative?: The Composition of Commissions of Inquiry created in New Zealand since 1970".

Dr. Catt holds an MA (Hons) in Modern History and Politics from Edinburgh University and a PhD (on tactical voting) from the London School of Economics.

She was the lead of the International Election Expert Research Team, observing the Catalan Referendum in 2017.

== Selected works ==
- Catt, Helena. "Book Review: David M. Farrell and lan McAllister, The Australian Electoral System: Origins, Variations and Consequences (Sydney: University of New South Wales Press, 2006)." Political Science, 58:2, 90-91. 2006.
- Catt, Helena. "Are Commissions Representative?: The Composition of Commissions of Inquiry created in New Zealand since 1970." Political Science, 57:1, 77-87. 2005.
- Catt, Helena and Murphy, Michael. "What voice for the people? categorising methods of public consultation." Australian Journal of Political Science, 38:3, 407-421, 2003.
- Catt, Helena. "The New Zealand Election of 27 November 1999." Australian Journal of Political Science, 35:2, 299-304, 2000.
- Catt, Helena. "Are demands for a ‘politics of presence’ detected by the ‘democratic audit'?." Commonwealth & Comparative Politics, 37:1, 56-70, 1999.
- Catt, Helena. Democracy in Practice. Routledge, New York, 1999.
- Catt, Helena, Harris, Paul and Roberts, Nigel S. Voter ́s Choice:Electoral Change in New Zealand?. Dunmore Press, Palmerston North, 1992.
