= 2017 Catalan independence referendum =

Referendum in the Spanish region of Catalonia

- 1 October 2017
- Do you want Catalonia to become an independent state in the form of a republic?

Results
Choice	Votes	%
Yes	2,044,038	92.01%
No	177,547	7.99%
Valid votes	2,221,585	97.17%
Invalid or blank votes	64,632	2.83%
Total votes	2,286,217	100.00%
Registered voters/turnout	5,313,564	43.03%
- Yes: >90% 80–90%
- Source: Government of Catalonia

An independence referendum was held on 1 October 2017 in the Spanish autonomous community of Catalonia, passed by the Parliament of Catalonia as the Law on the Referendum on Self-determination of Catalonia and called by the Generalitat de Catalunya. The referendum, known in the Spanish media by the numeronym 1-O (for "1 October"), was declared unconstitutional on 7 September 2017 and suspended by the Constitutional Court of Spain after a request from the Spanish government, who declared it a breach of the Spanish Constitution. Additionally, in early September the High Court of Justice of Catalonia had issued orders to the police to try to prevent the unconstitutional referendum, including the detention of various persons responsible for its preparation. Due to alleged irregularities during the voting process, as well as the use of force by the National Police Corps and Civil Guard, international observers invited by the Generalitat declared that the referendum failed to meet the minimum international standards for elections.

The referendum was approved by the Catalan parliament in a session on 6 September 2017, boycotted by 52 anti-independence parliamentarians, along with the Law of juridical transition and foundation of the Republic of Catalonia the following day 7 September, which stated that independence would be binding with a simple majority, without requiring a minimum turnout. After being suspended, the law was finally declared void on 17 October, being also unconstitutional according to the Statute of Autonomy of Catalonia which requires a two-thirds majority, 90 seats, in the Catalan parliament for any change to Catalonia's status. The referendum question, which voters answered with "Yes" or "No", was "Do you want Catalonia to become an independent state in the form of a republic?". While the "Yes" side won, with 2,044,038 (90.18%) voting for independence and 177,547 (7.83%) voting against, the turnout was only 43.03%. The Catalan government estimated that up to 770,000 votes were not cast due to polling stations being closed off during the police crackdown, although the "universal census" system introduced earlier in the day allowed electors to vote at any given polling station. Catalan government officials have argued that the turnout would have been higher were it not for Spanish police suppression of the vote. On the other hand, most voters who did not support Catalan independence did not turn out, as the constitutional political parties asked citizens not to participate in the illegal referendum to avoid "validation". Additionally, numerous cases of voters casting their votes several times or with lack of identification were reported, and the counting process and the revision of the census were not performed with quality standards ensuring impartiality.

The days leading to the referendum witnessed hasty judicial fights, and the High Court of Justice of Catalonia eventually ordered police forces to impede the use of public premises for the imminent voting. With conflicting directives, the referendum mostly saw inaction of part of the autonomous police force of Catalonia, the Mossos d'Esquadra, who allowed many polling stations to open while the National Police Corps and the Guardia Civil intervened and raided several opened polling stations to prevent voting. Early figures of 893 civilians and 111 agents of the National Police and the Guardia Civil injured may have been exaggerated. According to Barcelona's judge investigating those police violence, 218 persons were injured in Barcelona alone. According to the official final report by the Catalan Health Service (CatSalut) of the Generalitat, 1066 civilians, 11 agents of the National Police and the Guardia Civil, and 1 agent of the regional police, the Mossos d'Esquadra, were injured. The United Nations High Commissioner for Human Rights, Zeid Ra'ad Al Hussein, urged the Spanish government to investigate all acts of violence that took place to prevent the referendum. The police action also received criticism from Amnesty International and Human Rights Watch which defined it as an "excessive and unnecessary use of force". Spanish Supreme Court judge Pablo Llarena stated Carles Puigdemont ignored the repeated warnings he received about the escalation of violence if the referendum was held.

Mossos d'Esquadra were investigated for disobedience, for allegedly not having complied with the orders of the High Court of Justice of Catalonia. Members of Mossos d'Esquadra under investigation included major Josep Lluís Trapero, who was investigated for sedition by the Spanish National Court. The Mossos d'Esquadra denied those accusations and said they obeyed orders applying the principle of proportionality, which is required by Spanish law in all police operations. The regional police and major Trapero were later cleared of any wrongdoing and the case against the force was dismissed.

== Background ==
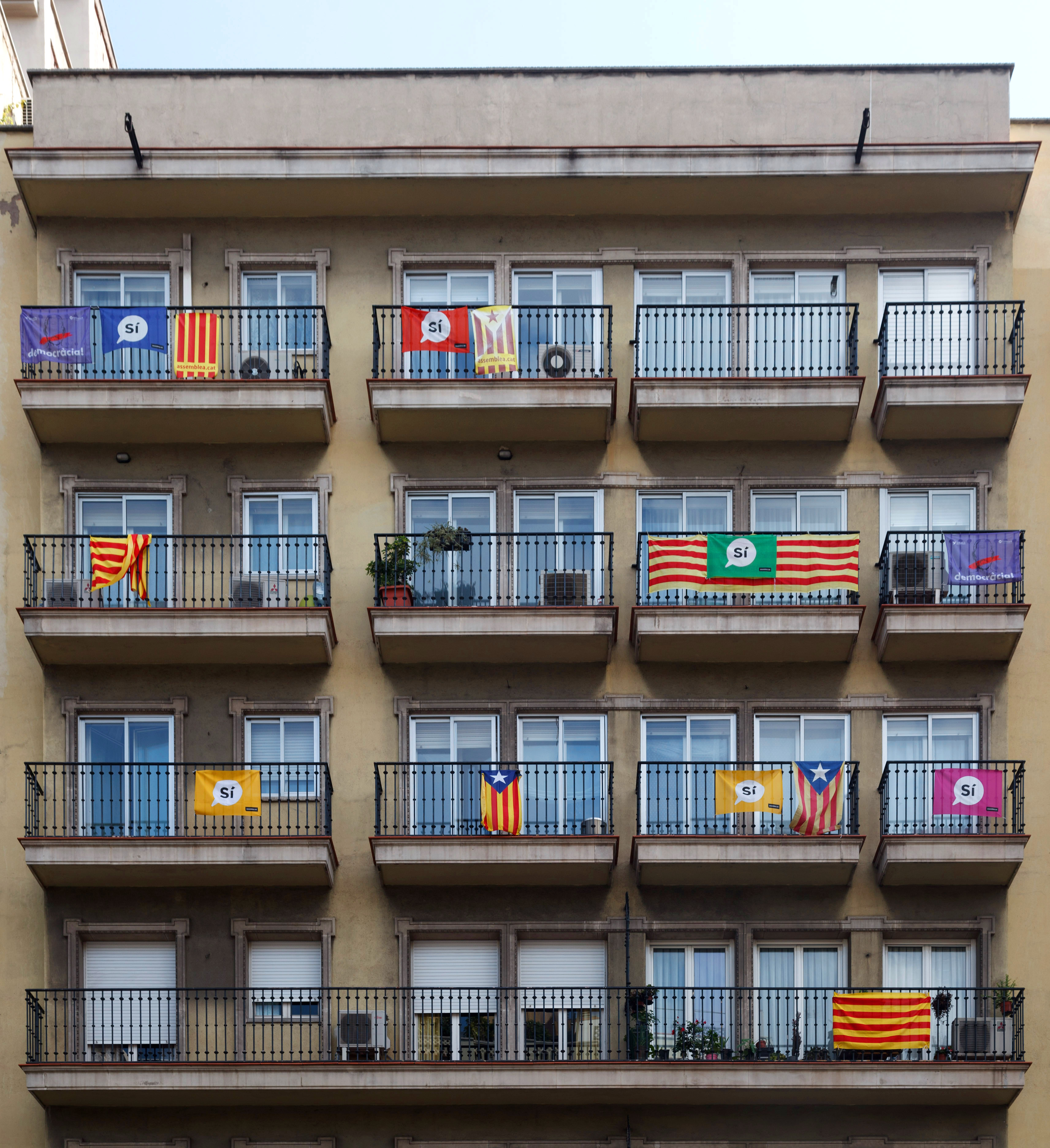
Pro-independence flags in Barcelona

The ballot was initially scheduled for no later than 17 September 2017, a result of an election pledge made by pro-independence parties ahead of the 2015 Catalan election (during the previous legislature, the Catalan government had held a non-binding "citizen participation process" about the question).

The election resulted in a minority government for the Junts pel Sí coalition (JxSí), which had won a plurality of MPs (62 of the 135 seats), plus conditional support from the 10 CUP-CC MPs. Shortly after the government was formed, it resolved to hold a referendum on independence.

On 24 January 2017, the Government of Catalonia held a privately organised conference in one of the rooms of the European Parliament in its Brussels headquarters. The event, entitled "The Catalan Referendum", was promoted by Carles Puigdemont, President, Oriol Junqueras, Vice President, and Raül Romeva. It was attended by 500 people, among whom were MEPs, diplomats and journalists from the international media.

=== Organisation ===
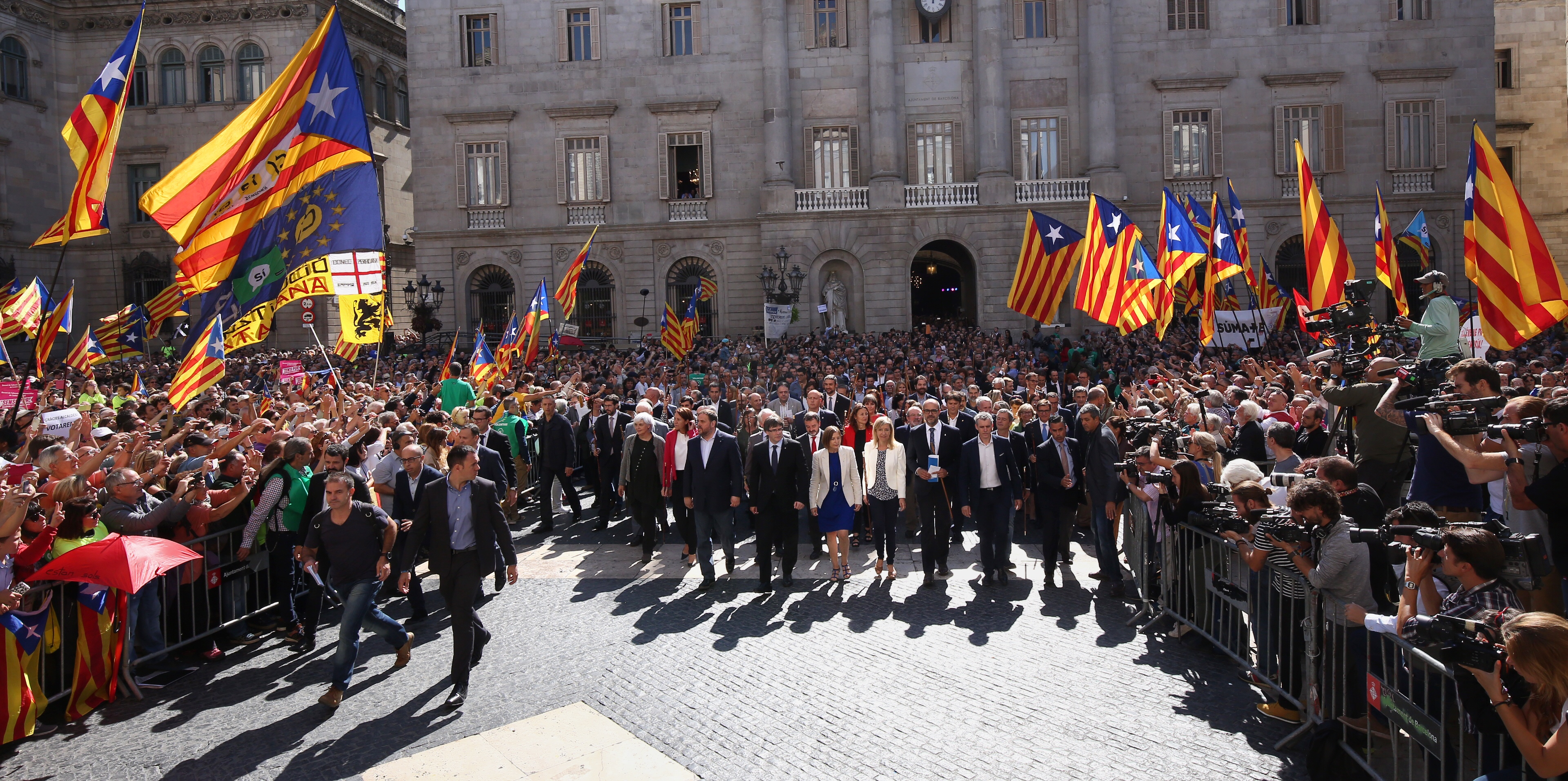
Catalan president Carles Puigdemont and 700 mayors of Catalonia on the meeting at preparation of referendum, 16 September 2017

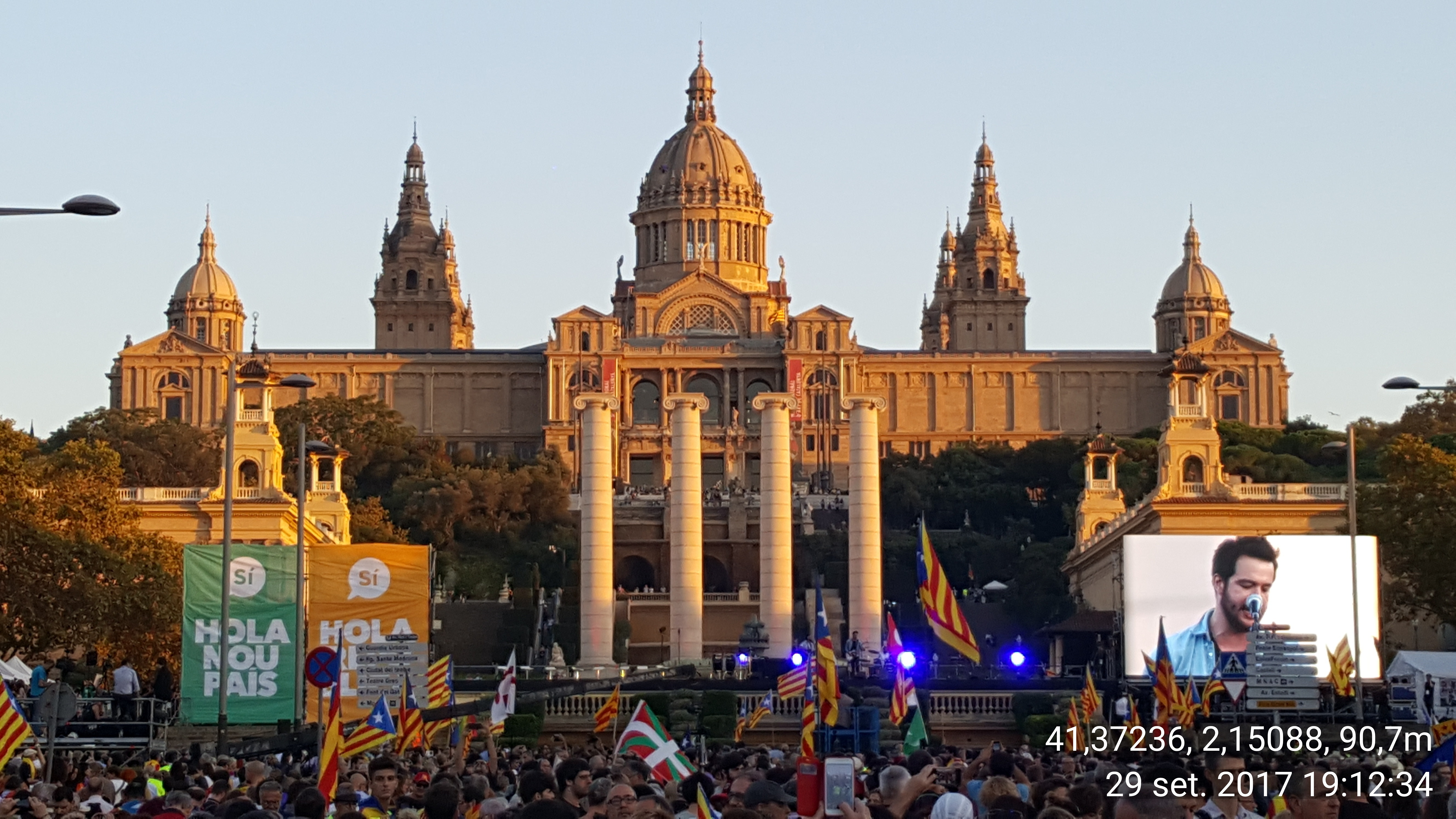
Final meeting of campaign for referendum in front of Palau Nacional, 29 September 2017

The Catalan government's decree officially calling the referendum was expected to be approved in the second half of August but was approved only on 6 September.

Shortly after the referendum was announced, attention focused on the issue of the ballot boxes, since the government of Spain is in charge of providing them, whereas for this non-state-sanctioned vote, the government of Catalonia would have to put them in place, potentially risking prosecution for the misuse of public funds. It is still unclear who bought them. The Catalan government opened a bidding process to buy them but no offers were presented. Cristóbal Montoro, the Spanish Minister of the Treasury, assured that the ballot boxes were not paid for with public money and some media reported they were finally bought by an individual whose identity remains unknown.

Tendering by the Catalan government for materials such as ballot papers and envelopes for a putative regional election in the region were thought by some to be an attempt to covertly organise the referendum. On 24 March, the Spanish Public Prosecutor's Office in Catalonia had already announced an inquiry to determine whether a referendum is in the planning.

In terms of its organisation, the electoral roll is one of the main points in contention, since this is managed by the National Institute of Statistics, an autonomous organisation placed under the jurisdiction of the government of Spain. To access its data, polls must have been authorised by the Spanish Congress. Without an undisputed access to the electoral roll, the results may be deemed unreliable. Similar difficulties could be met when it comes to the electoral commission to be formed for monitoring the polling and results.

By April 2017, the Catalan government had already received 5 judicial notices warning about the criminal liabilities they were exposed to if they continued the preparation of the referendum, as the constitutional court previously declared illegal any official budget allocation.

An official announcement by the government of Catalonia suggested that Catalan residents overseas willing to vote would have to register. By the end of June 2017, out of 285,000 Catalans living abroad and eligible to vote, 5,000 had registered.

=== Tensions within the Catalan government ===
On 3 July 2017, President Puigdemont sacked his Minister for Enterprise, Jordi Baiget, who, in the face of the legal challenges, had just expressed doubts regarding the referendum taking place as envisioned by the Catalan government.

Then, on 14 July, Puigdemont proceeded with a cabinet reshuffle, replacing three additional ministers in his cabinet (the ones responsible for presidency, education, and interior) in a move widely seen as a removal of the remaining hesitant voices within his cabinet in regards to the referendum issue.

On 17 July, the chief of the Catalan police, called Mossos d'Esquadra, resigned without giving any reason. The Catalan police force is seen as key to enforcing any court orders sought by the central government challenging the secession vote.

Additional isolated resignations and dismissals have been noted among some of the high-level civil servants potentially playing a role with the vote's organisation.

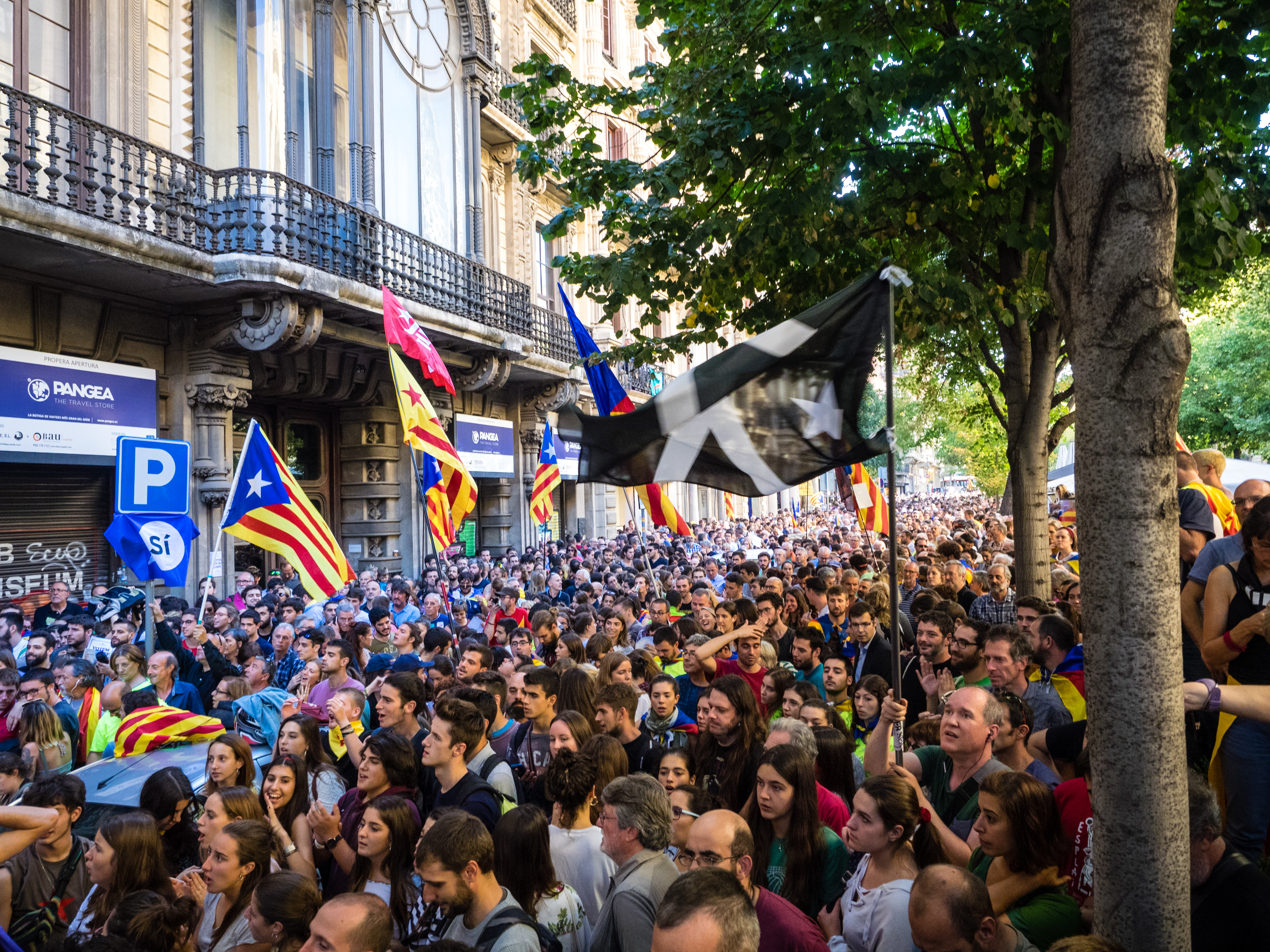
Protests in Barcelona after Spanish police raided Catalan government buildings, 20 September 2017

=== Scope ===
When the Spanish Constitutional Court suspended the law on the referendum on 7 September 2017, it forbade several Catalan office holders, the Catalan media, as well as the 948 municipalities of Catalonia to participate in the preparation of the referendum. The municipalities were instructed to reply within 48 hours whether they intended to comply or not. Out of 726 municipalities that answered, 682 announced that they would support the referendum anyway, 41 announced they would refuse to support it, and three, including the municipality of Barcelona, answered without making their intentions clear.

Around 150 people chanted slogans in favour of the police operation, the unity of Spain and against holding a referendum vote, 21 September 2017.

Among those that refused to support the referendum, however, there are large population centers, such as the provincial capitals of Lleida (140,000 inhabitants) and Tarragona (130,000 inhabitants) or the cities of Terrassa (215,000 inhabitants) and Hospitalet de Llobregat (250,000 inhabitants) governed by PSC mayors. The mayor of Barcelona, Ada Colau, while refusing to make a statement whether the municipality of Barcelona would provide logistical support to the referendum or not, strongly criticised the "language of testosterone" and the pressure that she said was being exerted on the municipalities. Nevertheless, she announced that she would do anything possible to allow those in Barcelona who wished to vote to do so.

The Catalan government financed advertisement for the referendum in the regional public television and radio, in spite of a legal notice against such actions by the High Court of Justice of Catalonia. No campaign for the No-side was organized, as no party opposing independence participated in the referendum nor wanted to legitimize it. In a few locations, fake posters with the logos of the main opposition parties and asking to vote No were reported.

=== Police operation to stop the referendum ===
The Catalan National Assembly's pro-independence "Sí" flag

On 20 September 2017, following orders of the trial court number 13, the Spanish Civil Guard started Operation Anubis. During the first day, the police officers raided different headquarters of the Government of Catalonia and arrested 14 senior officials involved in the preparation of the referendum. Simultaneously, several printing companies were searched for ballot papers and ballot boxes. Crowds gathered around the regional ministries to support the arrested staff and later on several pro-independence organisations, including the Catalan National Assembly (ANC) and Òmnium Cultural. A crowd of more than 40,000 people heeded the call made by Òmnium Cultural and ANC and surrounded the Catalan economy department, preventing the exit of the Civil Guard agents. Demonstrators vandalised three vehicles of the Civil Guard and their occupants were forced to flee into the Economy Department building, a court clerk remained trapped until midnight inside the building and had to flee by the roof, while several agents were trapped throughout the night as demonstrators shouted outside "You won't get out!". The damages in the vehicles (3 Nissan Patrol) accounted for €135,632. The Civil Guard agents cornered into the building made 6 calls for help to the autonomous police force of Catalonia, Mossos d'Esquadra, which were ignored. The first request for help was at 9:14 am with the subject: "Urgent – Request for support to Mossos".

Both Mossos d'Esquadra Major Josep Lluís Trapero Álvarez and Barcelona Intendant Teresa Laplana Cocera were charged with sedition because of the role played by the regional police. Trapero stated that the mossos were not warned with enough time and that the demonstration was peaceful. Two Catalan pro-independence leaders Jordi Sànchez and Jordi Cuixart (Assemblea Nacional Catalana and Òmnium Cultural, respectively) were sent to prison without bail by Spain's National Court. They are being investigated for alleged crimes of sedition for their role in organising these massive protests aimed at hindering the Civil Guard investigation. On 20 September morning, Jordi Sànchez called for "peaceful resistance" to the police operation through social media. The investigating judge stated that the leaders did not call for "peaceful demonstration but to the protection of Catalan officials through 'massive citizens' mobilisations" and that Jordi Sànchez, on top of a vehicle, encouraged the demonstrators with expressions such as "no one goes home, it will be a long and intense night". According to the judge the actions of Sànchez and Cruixat are into the scope of sedition, a felony regulated by the article 544 and subsequents of the Spanish Criminal Code:

Conviction for sedition shall befall those who, without being included in the felony of rebellion, public and tumultuously rise up to prevent, by force or outside the legal channels, application of the laws, or any authority, official corporation or public officer from lawful exercise of the duties thereof or implementation of the resolutions thereof, or of administrative or judicial resolutions.

— Article 544 of the Spanish Criminal Code.

A video uploaded to Twitter shows Cuixart and Sànchez on top of one of the vandalized Guardia civil cars on that night saying "Above all... We ask that you dissolve this demonstration, as best as you can, very calmly, today, in a few minutes". According to the source this happened around 11:00 pm and would contradict one of the arguments used by the investigating judge. Amnesty International considered "pre-trial detention" excessive in this case and called for "immediate release" of Jordi Sànchez and Jordi Cuixart.

In the following days, the Spanish Civil Guard and the Spanish National Police were reinforced with police officers from the rest of Spain, which are expected to reach 16,000 police and military police officers distributed in different Catalan cities on 1 October 2017 and would continue to carry out searches in companies that allegedly had referendum ballots or ballot boxes. This would spark multiple protest demonstrations all across Catalonia, including cacerolazos during the night. Demonstrations "in defense of the right to decide of the Catalans" were held in several cities in Spain, though few people attended. On the other hand, demonstrations were held throughout Spain in which thousands of people protested against the referendum and the agents were acclaimed by the crowds in numerous cities of Spain when they left for Catalonia.

A conference named Referendum yes or yes that was going to be held in Vitoria-Gasteiz on 15 September was forbidden by the courts after a request from the Spanish government. The speakers, including the pro-independence deputy Anna Gabriel, disobeyed the ruling and tried to hold the conference anyway, but the room where it was taking place was evicted by the police five minutes after starting. One year later, the same court recognized there were no reasons to suspend the conference.

In the days previous to the referendum, the Spanish civil guard shut down more than 140 websites following a court order issued by the High Court of Justice of Catalonia, including the official one from the Catalan government and the main site of the Catalan civil organization ANC. That involved sending requests — and sometimes, directly sending the Guardia Civil — to major Spanish telecom operators offices, domain providers, the dotCat Foundation and Google, in this particular case to remove an app from Google Play that included information on polling stations. This situation was denounced by Internet-related organizations from around the world including Internet Society, APC, EFF, The Tor Project and Xnet.

== Administration ==
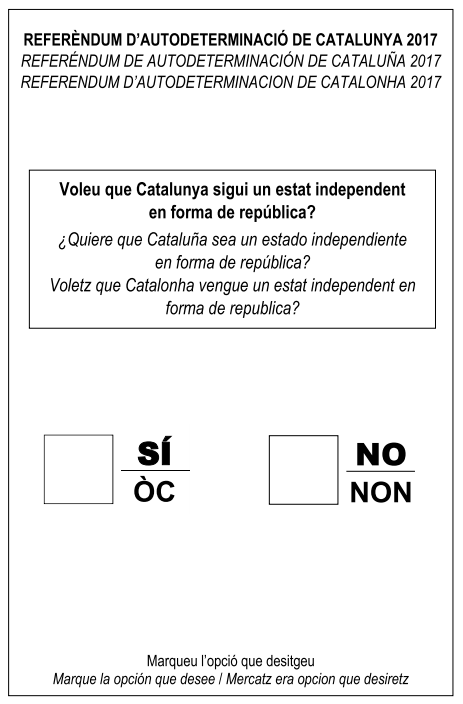
Ballot paper that the Catalan government intended to use in the referendum, in Catalan, Castilian Spanish and Aranese Occitan, the three official languages of Catalonia

The Catalan Government announced it planned to hold the referendum on 1 October 2017. The Electoral Commission of Catalonia was responsible for overseeing the referendum, but it was dissolved on 22 September 2017 after the Constitutional Court announced that otherwise they would be fined between €6,000 and €12,000 per day. The campaign was planned to last 15 days, spanning from 00:00 on 15 September 2017 to 24:00 on 29 September 2017.

According to the Catalan government, the following people were entitled to vote in the referendum:

- Those who have the political condition of Catalan, are 18 years of age or older on the voting day, are not under any of the situations that legally deprive the right to vote and are on the electoral roll.
- Those Catalans currently residing abroad and who have their last residence in Catalonia, fulfil all the legal requirements, and have formally applied to take part in the voting process.

=== Question ===
The question of the referendum was asked "Do you want Catalonia to become an independent state in the form of a republic?".

Ballot question
English	Do you want Catalonia to be an independent state in the form of a republic?
Catalan	Voleu que Catalunya sigui un estat independent en forma de república?
Spanish	¿Quiere que Cataluña sea un estado independiente en forma de república?
Occitan	Voletz que Catalonha vengue un estat independent en forma de republica?

=== International observers ===
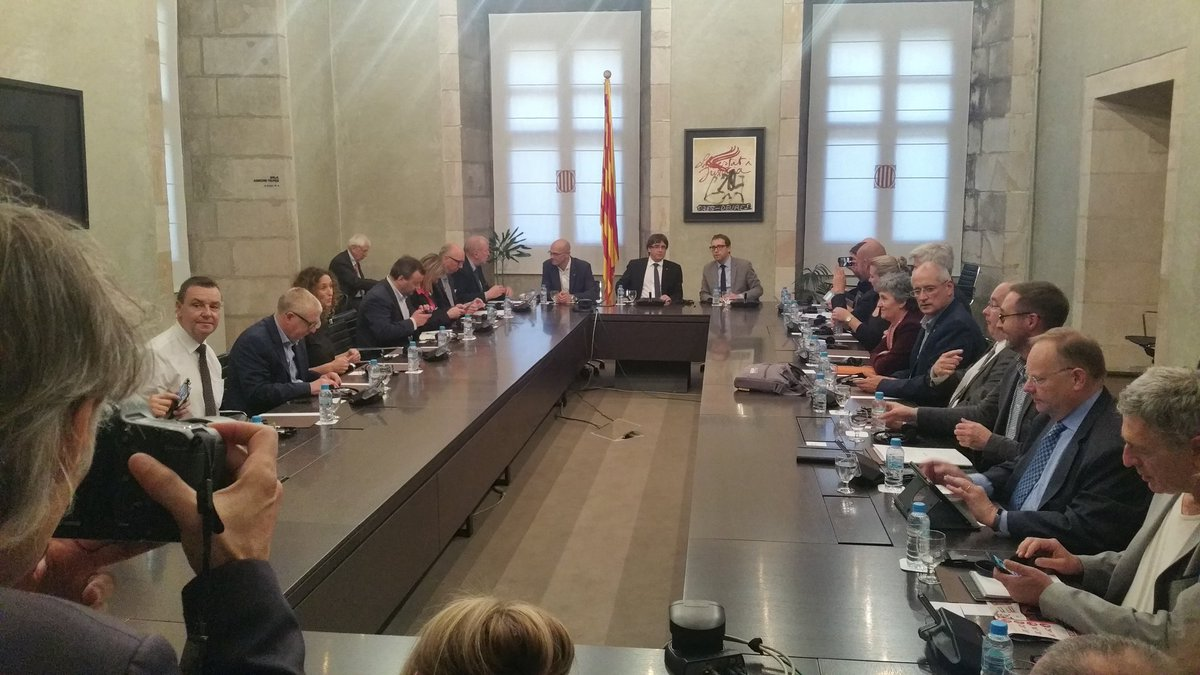
Sinn Féin representatives meeting Catalan President Carles Puigdemont ahead of the referendum.

The referendum was attended by several international observers who declared that no proper referendum took place in Catalonia. The first accredited international observers, led by The Hague Center for Strategic Studies, were headed by Daan Everts and consisted of 20 observers from the United States of America, the United Kingdom, the Netherlands, France and Poland, among others. The second international mission, called the International Electoral Expert Research Team, was headed by Helena Catt and consisted of 17 observers from the United Kingdom, France, Ireland and New Zealand, among others. There was also a delegation of 33 parliamentarians and politicians, called the International Parliamentary Delegation on Catalonia's Referendum on Self-Determination 1 October 2017, from political parties in Slovakia, Belgium, Denmark, Estonia, Finland, France, Germany, Greece, Iceland, Ireland, Israel, Latvia, Republic of Macedonia, Monaco, Spain, Sweden and United Kingdom.

Due to some irregularities and to the actions taken by the national police and civil guard, the international observers, invited by the Generalitat, declared that the referendum results could not be considered valid as the process failed to meet the minimum international standards for elections. They also criticized the police violence.

== Pre-result responses ==
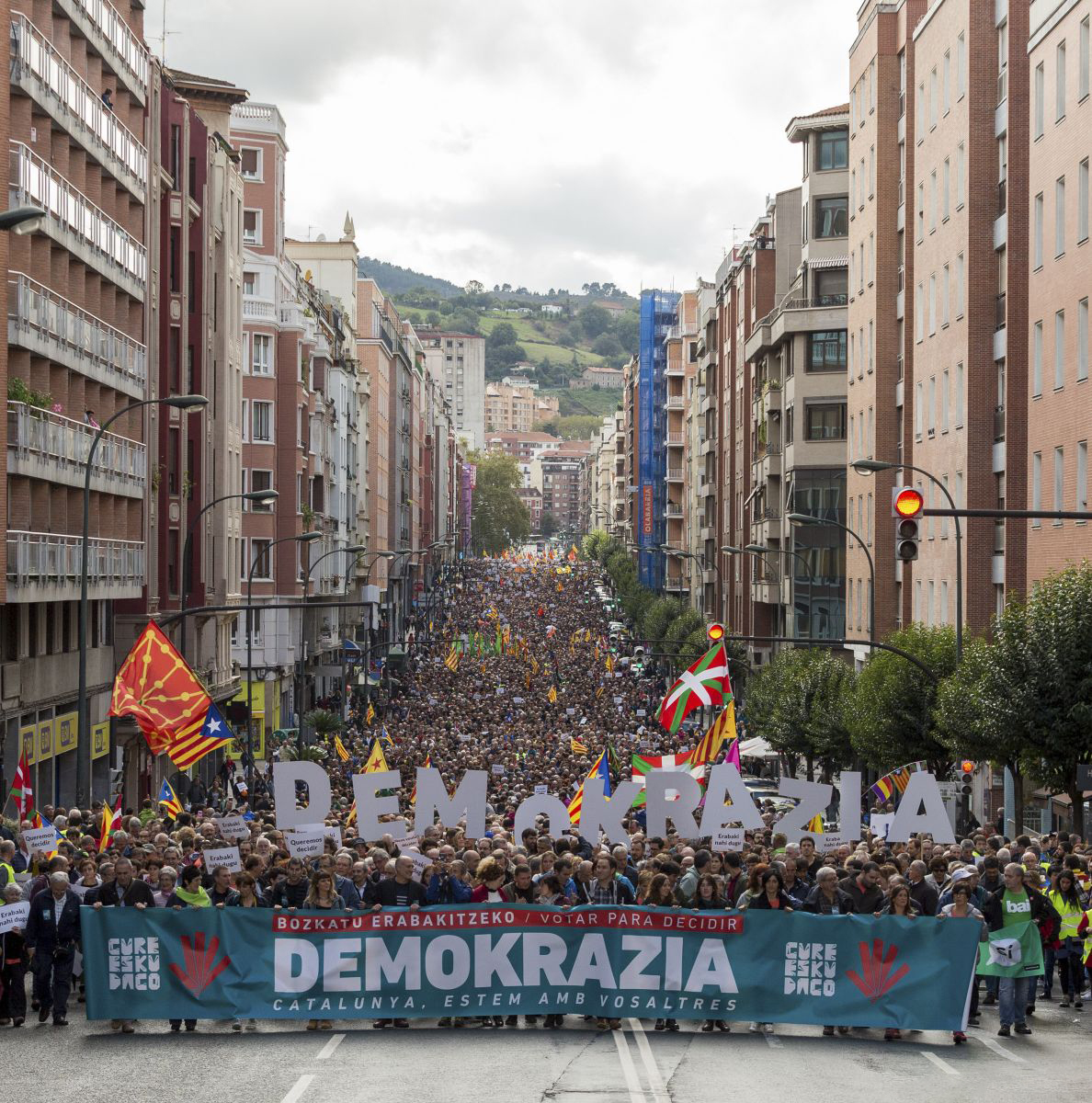
Demonstration in Bilbao in solidarity with the Catalan referendum, 16 September 2017

=== Domestic ===
In Spain, the referendum gathered support from nationalist-controlled regional parliaments:

- Basque Autonomous Community: The regional parliament showed its support for the referendum and criticised the Spanish government's stance on the issue. Tens of thousands took to the streets of Bilbao at two different dates in September in support of the referendum, with representatives of the nationalist parties, including the mayors of San Sebastián and Bilbao. ETA also issued a statement endorsing the referendum.
- Navarre: The parliament of Navarre, with the opposition from the opposition, denounced the Spanish government's de facto "takeover" of the Catalan devolution and its repressive approach.
- Galicia: Over 3,000 people marched through the streets of Santiago in Galicia to show their solidarity with the Catalan vote. The demonstration was attended by representatives of the nationalist parties En Marea and BNG.
- Madrid: The organisation in a public venue of a pro-referendum event led to some strifes due among other things to its depiction of the King in advertising posters. The event eventually relocated to private grounds following People's Party's complaints and the intervention of a judge.

=== UN member states ===
Most official country representatives stated that the referendum was an internal matter of Spain and some called for political dialogue:

- Belgium: Belgium's Prime Minister Charles Michel reaffirmed the government's call for political dialogue in Spain, and condemned any form of violence.
- Croatia: Croatian Prime Minister Andrej Plenković stated that Croatia considered the referendum an internal issue of Spain, while Croatian Ministry of Foreign and European Affairs called for dialogue.
- China: In response to a journalist, on 28 September 2017 foreign ministry spokesman Lu Kang said that the People's Republic of China believes "the issue of Catalonia belongs to the domestic affairs of Spain. We believe that the Spanish central government can properly handle relevant issues and maintain national solidarity, unity and prosperity".
- France: On 16 June, President Emmanuel Macron stated that he considers the question of Catalan independence to be an internal issue of Spain.
- Germany: On 8 September, Steffen Seibert, the spokesman for Chancellor Angela Merkel, stated that Germany was interested in stability in Spain and that for this it was necessary that the law, including the Spanish constitution, was respected at all levels.
- Hungary: On 18 September, government spokesman Zoltán Kovács announced that they would "respect the will of the people". At the same time, he called the independence issue an "internal issue of Spain and Catalonia".
- Lithuania: Lithuanian President Dalia Grybauskaitė said that the referendum on Catalonia's independence did not comply with the Spanish Constitution, but to use force is a failure of the Spanish authorities, expressing optimism that dialogued solutions would be found. On 28 September, Minister of Foreign Affairs Linas Linkevičius commented that Baltic states' movement to regain independence from the Soviet Union is not comparable with the situation in Catalonia due to Spain being a democracy that follows the rule of law and urged for a constructive dialogue.
- Portugal: Foreign Minister Augusto Santos Silva declined to comment on the referendum in Catalonia on 27 September, but believed that the Spanish government would be able to resolve the issue, in agreement with the Spanish constitution and law. A manifesto signed by Portuguese personalities, including the former socialist presidential candidate Manuel Alegre and the former leader of the Left Bloc Francisco Louçã, appealed to a "negotiated political solution" to the political situation in Catalonia.
- Russian Federation: The head of the international affairs committee at Russia's upper house Konstantin Kosachev called on the Spanish government to lead a dialogue, compared it with the Ukrainian situation and stated "A state should be talking to its citizens, should reach accord. Like we are doing in Russia."
- Serbia: Minister of Foreign Affairs Ivica Dačić, in an interview with Deutsche Welle, stated that Catalonia wants to repeat the example of Kosovo, by declaring unilateral independence without any agreement from Madrid. He stated that Serbia cannot accept such a model and that it is not a political issue but a problem of international law.
- United Kingdom: Foreign Secretary, and future Prime Minister Boris Johnson described the referendum as an internal issue for Spain, saying "Spain is a close ally and a good friend, whose strength and unity matters to the UK", while also insisting rule of law be upheld.
- United States: On 13 April, the embassy in Madrid stated that the U.S. sees the question of Catalan independence as an internal issue of Spain. On 26 September, President Donald Trump, during his meeting with Mariano Rajoy, said that "Spain is a great country and it should remain united", and expressed his doubts on whether a referendum would be held. Earlier that month, the State Department spokeswoman Heather Nauert also considered the referendum an internal affair of Spain.

=== Other political parties, groups and sub-national governments ===
- United Kingdom: Jeremy Corbyn, leader of the UK Labour Party, issued a statement condemning the violence in Catalonia and called on the British government to appeal to the Spanish government to find a political solution.
  - Scotland: On 16 September, Fiona Hyslop, the Scottish Government Cabinet Secretary for External Affairs, among other things said that all peoples have the right to self-determination and to choose the form of government best suited to their needs.
  - Wales: First Minister Carwyn Jones of Welsh Labour talked of "violence replacing democracy and dialogue", while leader of Plaid Cymru Leanne Wood criticised this position describing violence as "not on both sides".
- Denmark: A group of 17 Danish MPs from seven parties criticised the growing tensions in the weeks before the referendum and called on the Spanish government to play a constructive role and encourage political dialogue.
- European Union Parliament: Gregor Gysi, the chairman of the Party of the European Left, condemned the arrests by the Guardia Civil in the run-up to the referendum and called for a political solution to the problem.
- Italy:
  - The Lega Nord leader Matteo Salvini expressed his solidarity to the Catalan people after the arrests of 14 Catalan government officials; however, he also kept distance from the Catalan referendum calling it "a stretch" against the Spanish law.
  - Sardinia: The regional government expressed its support and solidarity to the Catalan community through a specific resolution approved by the regional council, and offered to print ballots for the referendum and to guard them. On 25 October, the Sardinian council issued a new resolution condemning the use of violence and supporting the right to choose any political option, including self-determination.
- Belgium: On 20 September, the Minister-President of the Flemish Region Geert Bourgeois urged the Spanish government to go into dialogue with the Catalan government or resort to international mediation.
- Switzerland: On 27 September, a group of MPs from all parties of the Council of States sent a letter to the Spanish government supporting the Catalan referendum and condemning the arrests of people and seizure of voting material.
- Rojava: On 29 September, TEV-DEM declared their support for the referendum.
- Slovenia: Speaker of the National Assembly Milan Brglez stated that the "Catalans have the right to self-determination".

=== International organizations and institutions ===
- European Union: On 7 September, Antonio Tajani, the President of the European Parliament, stated in a letter to Spanish MEP Beatriz Becerra (UPyD) that the constitutional order of each EU member state needed to be respected at all times. He also stated that if a territory would secede from an EU member state, it would become a third country with respect to the EU and the EU treaties would no longer apply there.

On 14 September, the President of the European Commission, Jean-Claude Juncker, said that the EU "would follow and respect the rulings of the Spanish constitutional court and parliament". Further, while the EU would respect the choice if a "yes" for Catalan independence were to come to pass, Juncker stated that Catalonia could not become an EU member the day after the vote.
On 2 October, the European Commission released a statement on its webpage declaring the referendum illegal.

- Council of Europe: The Council of Europe, when consulted by Carles Puigdemont, said that any referendum must be carried out "in full compliance with the constitution".
- United Nations: The UN has refused to participate in the monitoring of the referendum.

== Opinion polls ==
=== On 1 October 2017 referendum ===
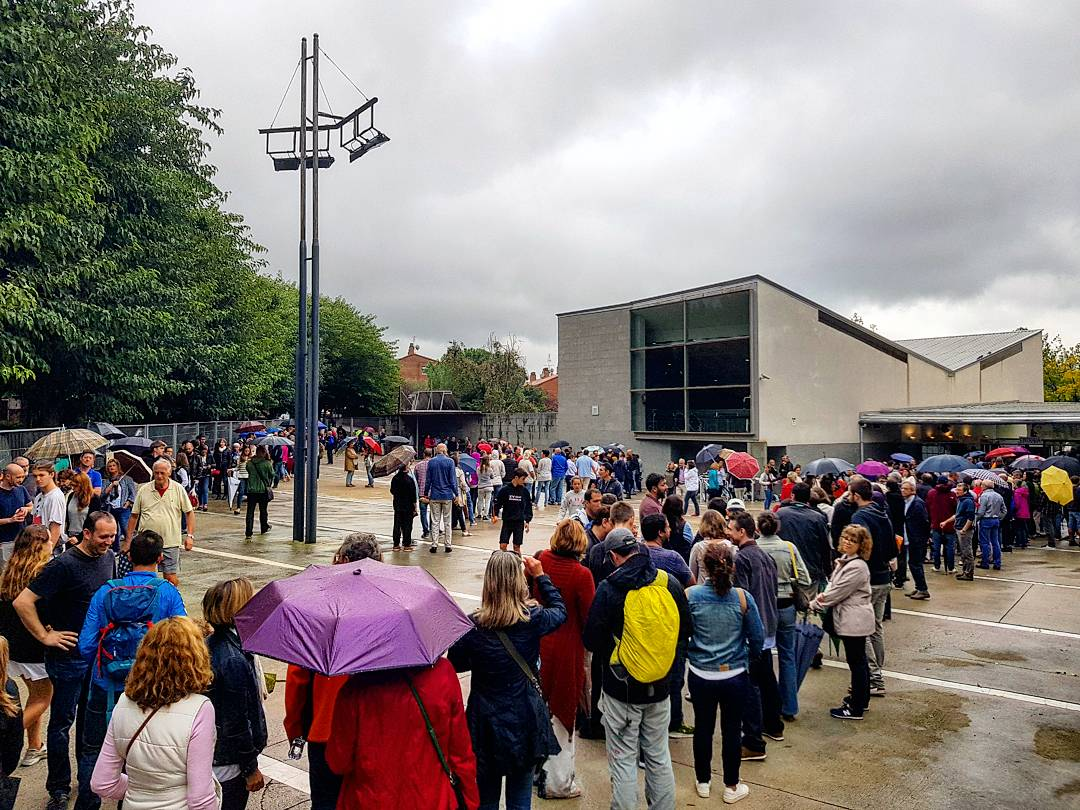
Queues of voters at polling stations for the referendum

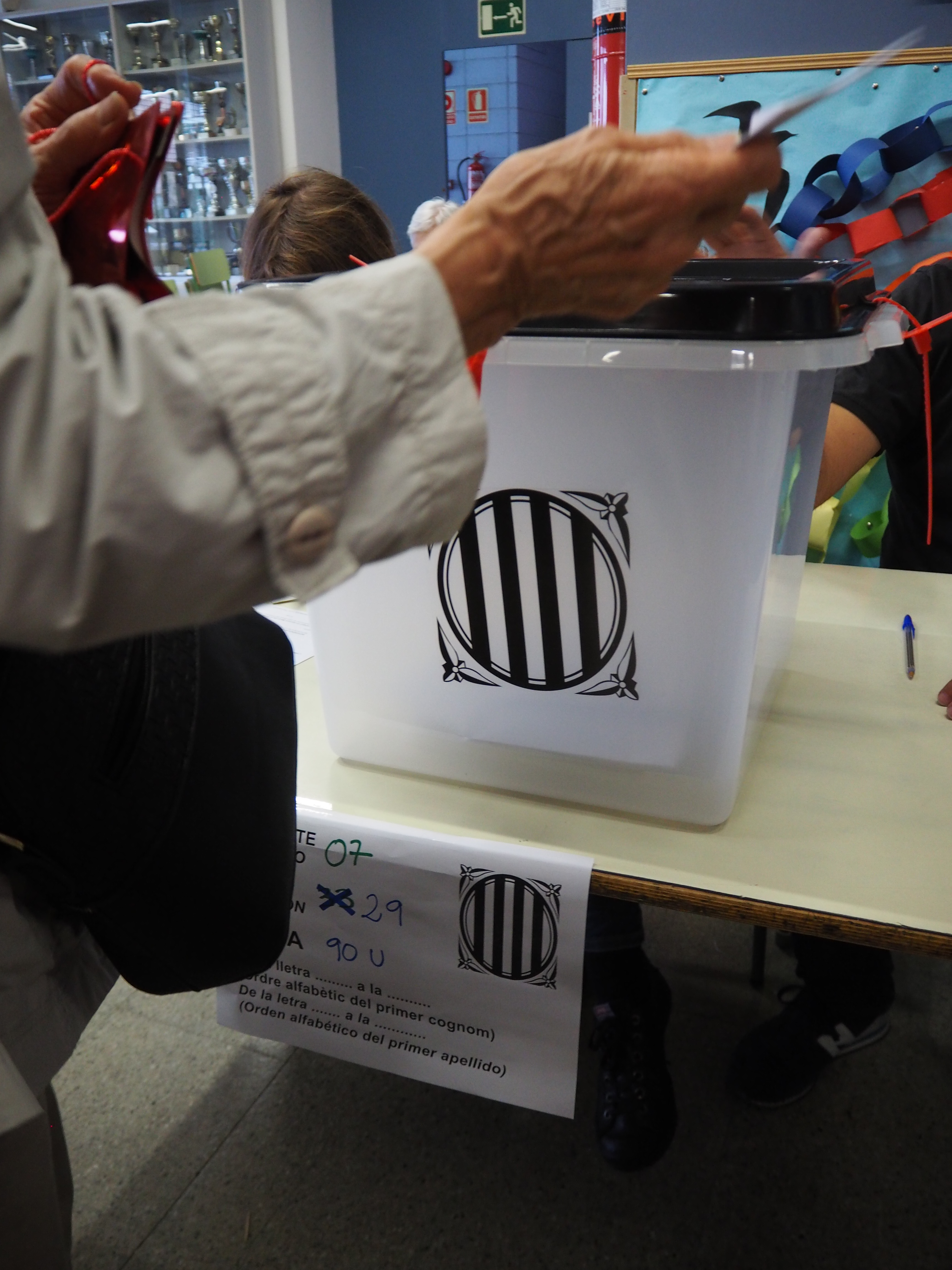
A person voting in Guinardó, Barcelona

Pollsters generally started using the proposed referendum question ("Do you want Catalonia to be an independent state in the form of a republic?") after it was revealed in early June 2017.

The Centre for Opinion Studies (Centre d'Estudis d'Opinió, CEO) polled respondents on their intentions rather than asking them the actual referendum question. In its March 2017 poll, aside from asking respondents whether they would want Catalonia to become an independent state, it asked their intents in the event of a referendum on the independence of Catalonia being called and organised by the Government of Catalonia without agreement from the Spanish Government. In a July 2017 poll a similar question was proposed, with the difference that it asked about the actual 1 October referendum.

==== Total ====
Polling firm/Commissioner	Fieldwork date	Sample size	Yes	No	Other/ Abst.	Question	Lead
Opinòmetre/Ara	16 Sep 2017	1,000	44.1	38.1	3.9	13.9	6.0
NC Report/La Razón	1–8 Aug 2017	800	41.5	48.6	–	9.9	7.1
Opinòmetre/Ara	17–20 Jul 2017	1,000	41.9	37.8	4.2	16.1	4.1
GESOP/CEO	26 Jun–11 Jul 2017	1,500	39.0	23.5	23.0	14.5	15.5
NC Report/La Razón	29 Jun–1 Jul 2017	800	44.0	48.6	–	7.4	4.6
GAD3/La Vanguardia	23–29 Jun 2017	?	42.5	37.6	10.2	9.7	4.9
DYM/El Confidencial	22–28 Jun 2017	531	47.0	44.4	–	8.6	2.6
Opinòmetre/Ara	12–15 Jun 2017	1,000	42.3	38.9	6.0	12.8	3.4
GESOP/CEO	6–21 Mar 2017	1,500	43.3	22.2	28.6	5.9	21.1

==== Certain to vote ====
(Note: voters who were not willing to vote were primarily those opposed to independence and/or a referendum being held, so support for independence among those who were certain to vote was expected to be high.)

Polling firm/Commissioner	Fieldwork date	Sample size	Turnout	Yes	No	Question	Lead
The National	30 Sep 2017	3,300	62	83.0	16.0	2.0	67.0
Opinòmetre/Ara	16 Sep 2017	1,000	51.0	69.9	14.3	15.8	55.6
Celeste-Tel/eldiario.es	12–15 Sep 2017	800	59.9	59.5	30.7	9.8	28.8
Sociométrica/El Español	28 Aug–1 Sep 2017	700	50	72.0	28.0	–	44.0
Opinòmetre/Ara	17–20 Jul 2017	1,000	54.9	66.5	18.5	15.0	48.0
GESOP/CEO	26 Jun–11 Jul 2017	1,500	67.5	57.8	34.8	7.4	23.0
DYM/El Confidencial	22–28 Jun 2017	531	70.1	65.4	28.4	6.2	37.0
Opinòmetre/Ara	12–15 Jun 2017	1,000	54.9	67.0	19.0	14.0	48.0

=== On the independence issue ===
Polling firm/Commissioner	Fieldwork date	Sample size	Yes	No	Other/ Abst.	Question	Lead	Question
Sociométrica/El Español	28 Aug–1 Sep 2017	700	50.1	45.7	–	4.2	4.4	(Note: "Would you prefer your community being an independent state?")
GESOP/CEO	26 Jun–11 Jul 2017	1,500	41.1	49.4	–	9.5	8.3	(Note: "Do you want Catalonia to become an independent state?")
GAD3/La Vanguardia	7–12 Apr 2017	601	41.9	39.7	9.1	9.3	2.2	(Note: "If a legal referendum on the independence of Catalonia was held, what do you think your vote would be?")
GESOP/CEO	6–21 Mar 2017	1,500	44.3	48.5	–	7.2	4.2	
GAD3/La Vanguardia	2–5 Jan 2017	601	42.3	41.9	5.9	9.9	0.4	
NC Report/La Razón	16–23 Dec 2016	1,000	44.8	47.2	–	8.0	2.4	(Note: "What would you vote in a referendum on the independence of Catalonia?")
DYM/CEO	12–17 Dec 2016	1,047	45.3	46.8	–	7.8	1.5	
GESOP/El Periódico	12–14 Dec 2016	800	48.9	40.3	2.4	8.5	8.6	(Note: "If you went out to vote, would you vote Yes or No to independence?")
Opinòmetre/CEO	17 Oct–3 Nov 2016	1,500	44.9	45.1	–	9.9	0.2	
GESOP/ICPS	26 Sep–17 Oct 2016	1,200	46.6	33.8	15.0	4.7	10.2	(Note: "If tomorrow a referendum on the independence of Catalonia was held, what would you do?")
NC Report/La Razón	2–6 Aug 2016	1,255	41.3	43.2	–	15.5	1.9	(Note: "Do you declare yourself independentist?")
Opinòmetre/CEO	28 Jun–13 Jul 2016	1,500	47.7	42.4	–	10.0	5.3	
GAD3/La Vanguardia	13–16 Jun 2016	800	48.4	35.3	7.7	8.6	13.1	
Opinòmetre/CEO	22 Feb–8 Mar 2016	1,500	45.3	45.5	–	9.2	0.2	
NC Report/La Razón	28–31 Dec 2015	1,255	44.1	49.7	–	6.2	5.6	(Note: "Do you favour Catalonia's independence?")
DYM/El Confidencial	30 Nov–3 Dec 2015	504	37.0	54.0	–	9.0	17.0	(Note: "Do you think Catalonia should separate from Spain and become an independent state?")
Feedback/La Vanguardia	20–27 Nov 2015	1,000	45.5	48.7	–	5.2	3.2	(Note: "If a legal referendum was held, do you think you would vote For or Against Catalonia becoming an independent state?")
GESOP/CEO	16–23 Nov 2015	1,050	46.6	48.2	–	5.2	1.6	
Opinòmetre/CEO	5–27 Oct 2015	2,000	46.7	47.8	–	5.6	1.1	
2015 Catalan regional election
Feedback/La Vanguardia	14–17 Sep 2015	1,000	45.2	45.9	–	8.9	0.7	
Metroscopia/El País	14–16 Sep 2015	2,000	45.0	46.0	–	9.0	1.0	(Note: "If a negotiated and fully legal referendum on the independence of Catalonia was held, what would be your likeliest vote?")
DYM/El Confidencial	14–16 Sep 2015	1,157	50.0	42.0	–	8.0	8.0	
Sigma Dos/El Mundo	31 Aug–3 Sep 2015	1,400	44.4	46.2	–	9.4	1.8	(Note: "Do you support Catalonia going independent?")
Feedback/La Vanguardia	6–9 Jul 2015	1,000	44.5	48.4	–	7.1	3.9	(Note: "If a referendum on the independence of Catalonia was held, what do you think your vote would be?")
Opinòmetre/CEO	2–24 Jun 2015	2,000	42.9	50.0	–	7.1	7.1	
Feedback/La Vanguardia	27–29 Apr 2015	1,000	43.7	47.9	–	8.3	4.2	
Opinòmetre/CEO	9 Feb–2 Mar 2015	2,000	44.1	48.0	–	7.8	3.9	
DYM/CEO	9–13 Dec 2014	1,100	44.5	45.3	–	10.3	0.8	
GESOP/ICPS	12 Nov–6 Dec 2014	1,200	49.9	27.4	18.8	4.1	22.5	
Feedback/La Vanguardia	1–4 Dec 2014	1,000	47.4	42.9	–	9.7	4.5	
Sigma Dos/El Mundo	17–20 Nov 2014	1,000	35.7	44.7	9.6	10.0	9.0	
2014 Catalan self-determination referendum
GESOP/8tv	30 Oct 2014	1,600	46.2	38.0	–	15.8	8.2	
Opinòmetre/CEO	29 Sep–23 Oct 2014	2,000	49.4	32.3	8.4	10.0	17.1	
Sigma Dos/El Mundo	26–29 Aug 2014	?	34.0	39.5	–	19.2	5.5	
Feedback/La Vanguardia	30 Apr–8 May 2014	577	43.4	43.5	–	13.4	0.1	
Opinòmetre/CEO	24 Mar–15 Apr 2014	2,000	47.2	27.9	12.4	12.6	19.3	
GESOP/El Periódico	26–28 Feb 2014	800	46.1	36.3	–	17.6	9.8	
GESOP/El Periódico	12–13 Dec 2013	800	44.1	36.2	–	19.7	7.9	
Feedback/La Vanguardia	16–19 Nov 2013	1,000	44.9	45.0	–	10.1	0.1	
GESOP/CEO	4–14 Nov 2013	2,000	54.7	22.1	17.0	6.3	32.6	
GESOP/El Periódico	16–18 Oct 2013	800	53.3	41.5	–	5.3	11.8	(Note: "Would you agree on Catalonia separating itself from Spain and becoming a new state within the EU?")
GESOP/ICPS	25 Sep–10 Oct 2013	800	48.6	25.2	21.9	4.3	23.4	
GESOP/CEO	31 May–13 Jun 2013	2,000	55.6	23.4	15.9	5.1	32.2	
GESOP/El Periódico	28–31 May 2013	800	57.8	36.0	–	6.3	21.8	
GESOP/CEO	4–14 Feb 2013	2,000	54.7	20.7	18.1	6.4	34.0	
GESOP/El Periódico	14–16 Jan 2013	800	56.9	35.0	–	8.2	21.9	
GESOP/ICPS	27 Nov–20 Dec 2012	1,200	49.2	29.2	15.1	6.5	20.0	
2012 Catalan regional election
Feedback/La Vanguardia	12–16 Nov 2012	1,000	47.5	40.2	–	10.1	7.3	(Note: "If a referendum on the independence of Catalonia was held, what would you vote?")
Feedback/La Vanguardia	6–9 Nov 2012	1,000	47.9	39.9	–	10.2	8.0	
DYM/CEO	22–30 Oct 2012	2,500	57.0	20.5	14.9	7.7	36.5	
Feedback/La Vanguardia	22–26 Oct 2012	1,000	52.8	35.4	–	9.7	17.4	
Feedback/La Vanguardia	8–11 Oct 2012	1,000	54.3	33.1	–	10.1	21.2	
Feedback/La Vanguardia	21–27 Sep 2012	1,200	54.8	33.5	–	10.2	21.3	
DYM/CEO	4–18 Jun 2012	2,500	51.1	21.1	22.1	5.8	30.0	
DYM/CEO	6–21 Feb 2012	2,500	44.6	24.7	25.2	5.5	19.9	
GESOP/ICPS	19 Sep–27 Oct 2011	2,000	43.7	25.1	23.2	8.0	18.6	
GESOP/CEO	29 Sep–13 Oct 2011	2,500	45.4	24.7	24.4	5.6	20.7	
GESOP/CEO	2–17 Jun 2011	2,500	42.9	28.2	23.8	5.2	14.7	
Noxa/La Vanguardia	1–2 Sep 2010	800	40.0	45.0	10.0	5.0	5.0	(Note: "If tomorrow a referendum on the independence of Catalonia was held, what would you vote?")

=== On whether a referendum should be held ===
Polling firm/Commissioner	Fieldwork date	Sample size	Yes	No	Question	Notes
Metroscopia/El País	18–21 Sep 2017	2,200	82.0	16.0	2.0	On a legal referendum as the best solution
GESOP/El Periódico	19–22 Feb 2017	?	71.9	26.1	2.0	On the State allowing a referendum
GAD3/La Vanguardia	13–16 Jun 2016	800	76.6	19.7	3.6	
NC Report/La Razón	16–23 Dec 2016	1,000	51.1	40.7	8.2	On holding a 9N-style referendum
GESOP/El Periódico	12–14 Dec 2016	800	84.6	13.8	1.6	
GESOP/El Periódico	12–14 Dec 2016	800	49.6	48.8	1.6	On holding a not legal referendum
NC Report/La Razón	2–6 Aug 2016	1,255	52.0	35.1	12.9	On agreeing a referendum with the State
GAD3/La Vanguardia	13–16 Jun 2016	800	75.7	20.6	3.7	
DYM/El Confidencial	30 Nov–3 Dec 2015	504	69.0	26.0	5.0	On the need of holding a referendum
Feedback/La Vanguardia	20–27 Nov 2015	1,000	78.8	19.9	1.3	
Feedback/La Vanguardia	14–17 Sep 2015	1,000	79.2	18.6	2.2	
Feedback/La Vanguardia	6–9 Jul 2015	1,000	79.8	19.4	0.8	
Feedback/La Vanguardia	27–29 Apr 2015	1,000	79.1	19.4	1.5	
Feedback/La Vanguardia	1–4 Dec 2014	1,000	83.9	14.5	1.6	
NC Report/La Razón	13–15 Nov 2014	?	54.3	39.9	5.8	On holding an agreed referendum
Feedback/La Vanguardia	30 Apr–8 May 2014	577	74.0	24.6	1.4	
GESOP/El Periódico	12–13 Dec 2013	800	73.6	20.0	6.4	On the State authorising the 9N referendum
Feedback/La Vanguardia	16–19 Nov 2013	1,000	73.5	23.6	2.9	
GESOP/El Periódico	28–31 May 2013	800	75.1	20.8	4.2	On the Government of Spain authorising a referendum
GESOP/El Periódico	28–31 May 2013	800	69.6	25.8	2.3	On holding a referendum
GESOP/El Periódico	14–16 Jan 2013	800	62.9	30.5	6.6	On holding a referendum even with the State's opposition
Feedback/La Vanguardia	12–16 Nov 2012	1,000	73.4	24.1	2.5	
Feedback/La Vanguardia	6–9 Nov 2012	1,000	73.6	24.0	2.4	
Feedback/La Vanguardia	22–26 Oct 2012	1,000	81.5	17.5	1.0	
Feedback/La Vanguardia	8–11 Oct 2012	1,000	81.7	17.6	0.7	
Feedback/La Vanguardia	21–27 Sep 2012	1,200	83.9	14.9	1.2	

== Results ==
=== Overall ===
Question: "Do you want Catalonia to become an independent state in the form of a republic?"

Choice	Votes	%
For	2,044,038	92.01
Against	177,547	7.99
Total	2,221,585	100.00
Valid votes	2,221,585	97.17
Invalid/blank votes	64,632	2.83
Total votes	2,286,217	100.00
Registered voters/turnout	5,313,564	43.03
Source: Government of Catalonia

The Catalan government estimated that polling stations representing up to 770,000 potential voters—14.5% of all registered voters—were closed down by police in raids, with any votes cast in those stations either seized, lost or inaccessible and therefore not counted. Catalan government spokesman Jordi Turull argued that turnout would have been higher were it not for Spanish police suppression. Catalan government officials argued that calculation by experts showed that without police pressure and closures, turnout could have reached up to 55%.

Earlier in the day, a universal census was introduced, so any Catalan elector going out to vote could do so at any one of the still functioning polling stations. Notorious examples of this included President Puigdemont himself—who voted in Cornellà del Terri instead of Sant Julià de Ramis where he was registered to vote, foiling a police operation to track him down along the way—or Parliament of Catalonia Speaker Carme Forcadell.

=== Results by province ===
Province	Electorate	Turnout	Yes		No	
Province	Electorate	Turnout	Votes	%	Votes	%
Barcelona	3,971,666	41.23	1,438,682	90.71	147,294	9.29
Girona	496,167	53.32	249,483	96.00	10,382	4.00
Lleida	298,140	52.83	146,583	95.14	7,485	4.86
Tarragona	547,591	40.62	205,038	94.33	12,331	5.67
Catalans abroad	N/A	N/A	4,252	98.72	55	1.28
Total	5,313,564	43.03	2,044,038	90.18	177,547	7.83

=== Results by vegueries ===
Vegueria	Electorate	Turnout	Yes		No	
Vegueria	Electorate	Turnout	Votes	%	Votes	%
Alt Pirineu i Aran	53,228	53.91	26,674	95.18	1,350	4.82
Barcelona	3,605,651	39.54	1,239,232	89.93	138,759	10.07
Central Catalonia	374,611	58.15	205,285	95.96	8,638	4.04
Girona	487,217	53.25	244,758	96.02	10,140	3.98
Lleida	245,266	52.12	118,799	94.98	6,274	5.02
Tarragona	420,740	36.82	142,386	94.12	8,897	5.88
The Ebre Lands	126,851	53.24	62,652	94.80	3,434	5.20
Catalans abroad	N/A	N/A	4,252	98.72	55	1.28
Total	5,313,564	43.03	2,044,038	90.18	177,547	7.83

=== Irregularities ===
Due in part to the deactivation and repeated blocking by the police of the computer programs used to implement universal census and result reporting, some irregularities were reported by Spanish media during the celebration of the referendum. Among them were people recorded voting more than once and votes cast by those not included in the census. Other media reported the system did not validate the second attempt when voting, but it could not be confirmed that this system worked during the whole process.

The Catalan government was not allowed to use the same ballot boxes used in other elections and referendums because they are owned by the Spanish government, so different ballot boxes were used, those were described as translucent by some media and opaque by some others in contrast to the transparent ballot boxes used in elections. Ballots and ballot boxes were transported together, which according to Spanish media raised doubts about whether those ballots were removed or not prior to the vote. Another controversial footage shows ballot boxes placed in the street, where any person could submit their vote without census control. According to a Catalan newspaper, a volunteer declared that it was "a symbolic vote" in Ramon i Cajal school, Barcelona, after Spanish police removed the ballot boxes at another nearby polling station.

There was no electoral board as it dissolved itself on 22 September to avoid being fined by the Constitutional Court and the counting system was blocked by the Guardia civil following orders from the Catalan High Court Justice. Guardia Civil also shut down a WordPress.com blog which alleged to be used as a voting system in the referendum, the Catalan government said they did not know about its existence.

The Spanish Government denounced that the rules of the referendum that were changed 45 minutes before opening. The new rules included the universal census according to which any citizen could vote in any voting center even if it was not the one originally assigned. They also accepted the use of non-official ballots printed at home and made optional the requirement of using envelopes.

=== Controversy over the results ===
The publication of the results generated controversy both for the lack of basic electoral warranties, as for the lack of coherence between the results that were published after 95% of the votes had been tallied and the official results published five days later.

One analyst said that the large pro-independence vote (90% by official estimates) could actually be a sign that many people did not vote at all, and that the referendum lacked the conditions for fairness.

In 71 municipalities the number of "yes" votes tallied were more than the number of registered voters for those municipalities, which could be partly explained by the "universal census" system introduced earlier in the day allowing people to vote in a different poll station than the one they were assigned.

The Civil Guard delivered a report to the Spanish High Court with recordings of conversations that allegedly demonstrate that "the results of the referendum were decided in the days leading up to its holding".

In the elections of December 2017 called by Spanish Prime Minister, parties supporting independence got 47.5% of the votes, but due to the high level of participation that was 33,970 more votes than 'Yes' votes were cast during the referendum.

== Aftermath ==
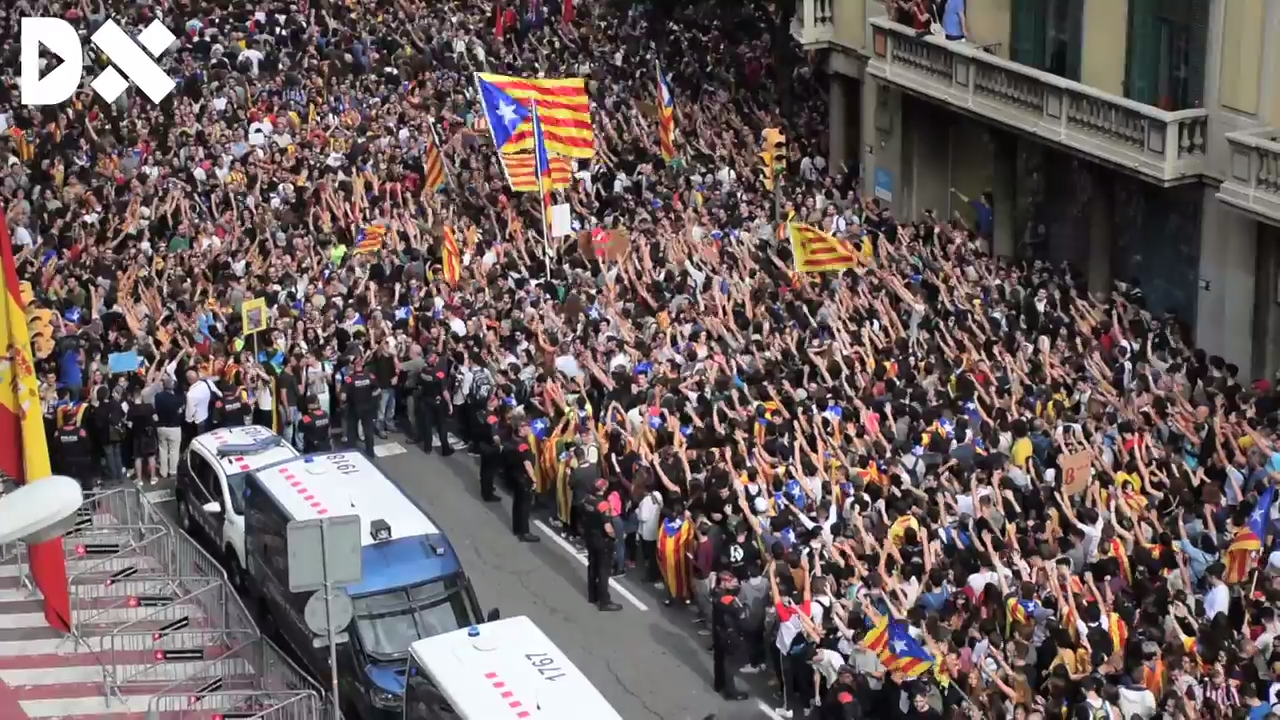
2017 Catalan general strike against police brutality

On 3 October 2017, Carles Puigdemont said that his government intended to act on the result of the referendum "at the end of this week or the beginning of next" and declare independence from Spain. Puigdemont would go before the Catalan Parliament to address them on Monday 9 October 2017, pending the agreement of other political parties. The same day, the King of Spain, Felipe VI, condemned the repeated acts of the government of Catalonia against the existing legal framework and appealed for unity in Spain, calling the situation "extremely serious".

On 4 October 2017, Mireia Boya, a lawmaker of the Popular Unity Candidacy (CUP), announced that a declaration of independence would likely come after the parliamentary session on 9 October.

On 5 October, Banco Sabadell, the second-largest bank based in Catalonia, announced its decision to move its legal headquarters out of the region amid economic uncertainty over the future of Catalonia's political situation ahead of a projected unilateral declaration of independence the ensuing week, which had seen sharp falls in the group's share prices the previous day and rating agencies downgrading the region. Concurrently, CaixaBank, the biggest bank in the region and the third largest in Spain, also announced it was considering redomiciling outside Catalonia. This sparked a massive business exit in the ensuing hours, with companies such as Abertis, Gas Natural, Grifols, Fersa Energias Renovables, Agbar, Freixenet, Codorníu, Idilia Foods, San Miguel Beer and Planeta Group also announcing or considering their intention to move their HQs out of Catalonia. The Spanish government announced on 6 October that it would issue a decree allowing companies based in Catalonia to move out of the region without holding a shareholders' meeting. On 11 October, Château de Montsoreau-Museum of Contemporary Art announced that it was repatriating its collection of Art & Language works that had been on loan at Barcelona Museum of Contemporary Art (MACBA) since 2010. Within two weeks, more than 1,000 business and firms would move out of Catalonia.

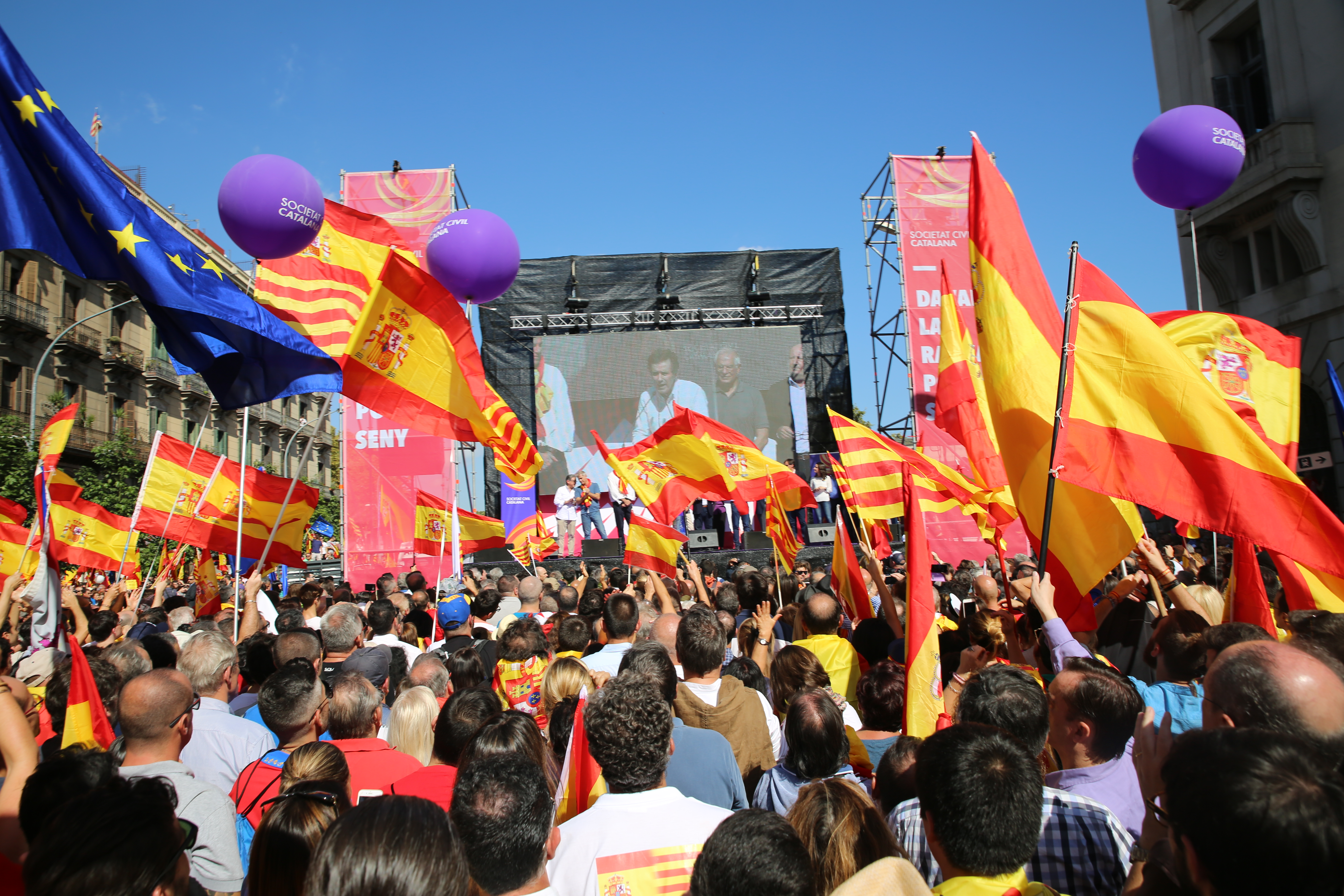
Demonstration against Catalan independence in Barcelona on 8 October 2017

On 7 October, tens of thousands of demonstrators rallied in Madrid and Barcelona dressed in white and without flags with the slogan 'Shall we talk?', asking for a deescalation of the political conflict. On 8 October, the largest demonstration against Catalan independence in recent Spanish history took place in Barcelona, the local police estimating at about 400,000 the number of participants. Former president of the European Parliament Josep Borrell, Nobel Prize winner Mario Vargas Llosa and several representatives of the opposition parties in the Catalan parliament delivered speeches against the independence process.

According to Swiss national radio, the Foreign Ministry of Switzerland offered to mediate between the two sides in the crisis. However, on 16 October, the Foreign Ministry of Switzerland released a press note declaring that no formal offer was made, also stating that the independent aspirations in Catalonia are an internal affair of Spain and should be resolved within its constitutional order. It also made clear that Switzerland fully respects Spanish sovereignty and that in any case any facilitation of the process could only take place in case that both sides requested it.

=== Violence and injuries ===
Spanish National Police in riot gear pushed by a crowd; protester Roger Español is hit in the eye by a rubber bullet (1 October 2017, Barcelona)

The Spanish National Police and Guardia Civil mounted operations to close the polling stations. The security forces met resistance from citizens who obstructed their access to the voting tables; in Sant Julia de Ramis, where Puigdemont was expected to vote, they were joined by Corps of Firefighters of Catalonia members who formed a "human shield" separating the police from civilians to help obstruct their access to the polling station. The police used force to try to reach the voting tables, in some cases using batons against firefighters and civilians, and dragged some of them away. The police made multiple charges. In some other incidents the security forces were surrounded and driven out by the crowds. According to the Ministry of the Interior, rubber bullets (balls) were only used against demonstrators in one of those incidents in the Barcelona's Eixample district. There were incidents at polling stations in Barcelona, Girona and elsewhere; the police forced entry to the premises, ejected the occupants and seized ballot boxes, some of them containing votes.

The Spanish government endorsed the police actions ordered by the regional high court. Carles Puigdemont accused Spanish authorities of "unjustified, disproportionate and irresponsible violence" and showing a "dreadful external image of Spain" while Amnesty International and Human Rights Watch criticized what they called "excessive and unnecessary use of force" by the National Police and the Civil Guard. The Spanish Coordinator for Prevention against Torture defined the police action as a "repression laboratory". Spanish Supreme Court judge Pablo Llarena stated Puigdemont ignored the repeated warnings he received about the escalation of violence if the referendum was held.

According to El País, after the first reports of violence, the government canceled the order given to the security forces, which pulled out early from the polling centers. Catalan Ombudsman Rafael Ribó, said there was evidence Angela Merkel asked Mariano Rajoy to stop police violence.

Various images and reports used to magnify the claims of police violence were circulated but were later found to be inaccurate or photoshopped, and reports argued later that such posts, as well as conspiracy theories, had been amplified through the same network of social network profiles that had earlier promoted alt-right and pro-Putin views during earlier elections in Western countries. A Republican Left of Catalonia (ERC) councillor accused the police of deliberately breaking her fingers one by one and of sexual abuse during a polling station evacuation, but later investigation disproved these statements. A real picture of an elderly woman bleeding in the head as a consequence of a police charge was chosen as one of the "Bloomberg's 100 photos of the 2017". The Spanish Ministry of the Interior instructed the Spanish Attorney General to investigate whether the accusations of police sexual abuse against protesters made by Mayor of Barcelona Ada Colau, who had mentioned the councilor's statements, could be considered a legal offense of slander against Spanish Law enforcement organisations.

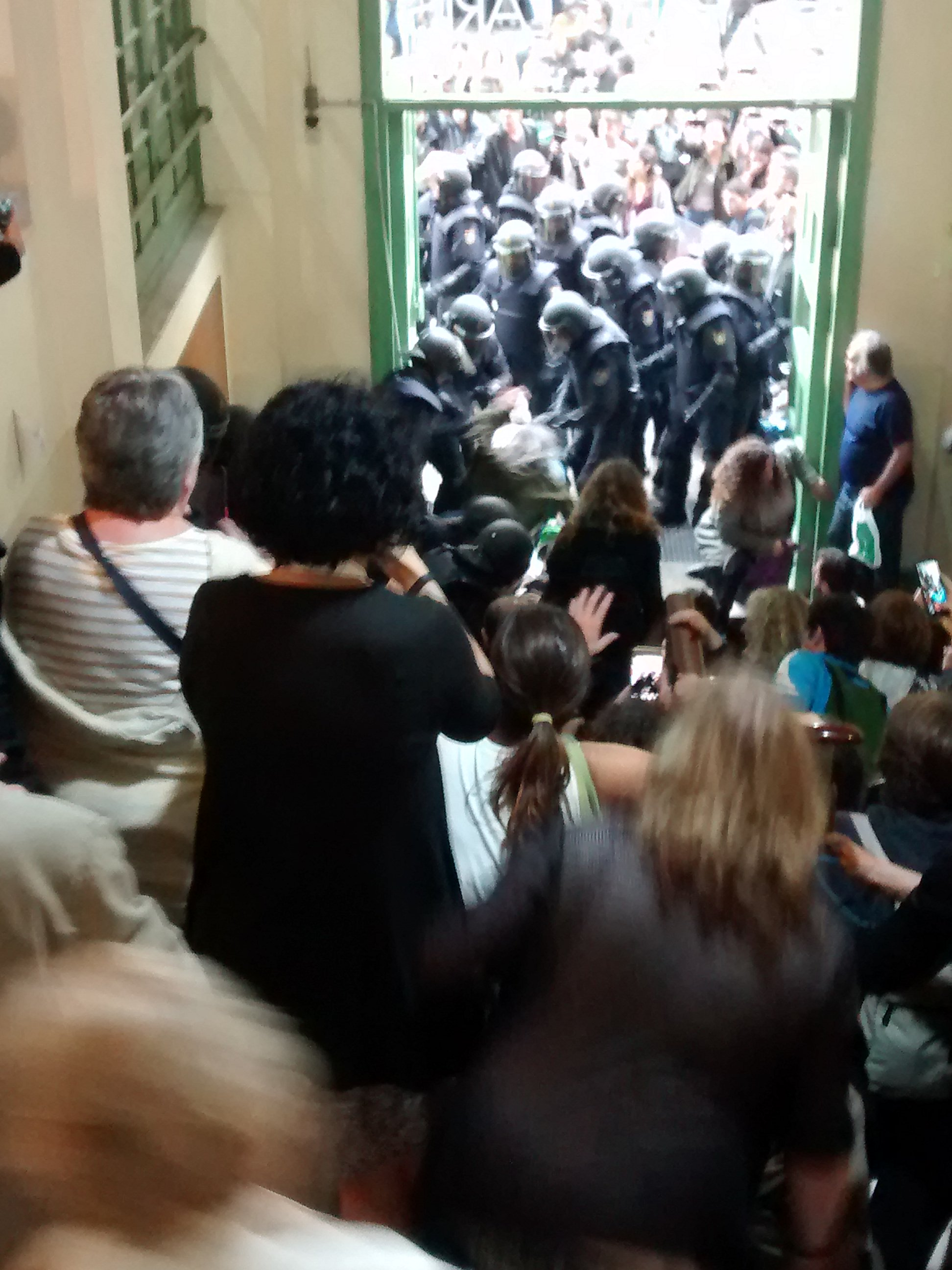
Spanish National Police storm Institut Pau Claris polling station on 1 October 2017

According to the judge, there were 218 persons injured on that day in the city of Barcelona alone. According to various sources previously reported figures for civilians and police may have been exaggerated. According to the Generalitat de Catalunya, 844 people requested the services of the Catalan emergency health service, this number includes people with irritation by gas and anxiety attacks. Of those injured, most were minor, but four people were hospitalised by the emergency health service and of those, two were in serious condition, one for unrelated causes and the other—musician Roger Español—after he was hit in the eye by a rubber bullet during the protests.

When police officers tried to enter inside the polling station near the Ramon Llull school, voters responded with a sit-in protest to block them from entering. After a few minutes, more anti-riot police officers were deployed and managed to break down the entrance to the polling station. Police officers confiscated the ballot boxes, some of them containing votes. On their way out, voters blocked the passage of the police cars standing or sitting in front of the police vehicles. Some of them harassed agents and targeted them with fences, umbrellas and other objects, among them Español. The agents responded by shooting rubber bullets. Español's injury cost him his vision in one eye and he sued three members of the Spanish National Police, adducing that one shot directly at his face. One witness, the journalist who recorded the images, testified he saw that a police officer pointed and shot horizontally, directly against demonstrators at a distance not exceeding 15 meters, hitting and injuring Español, which can be seen in the footage; according to four witnesses, there was no unrest at the moment the police charge and shots took place. 13 police officers were investigated for their actions in that polling station, even though the agent who shot the rubber bullet had not been identified yet.

Initially, the Ministry of the Interior said 431 agents were injured, 39 of them requiring immediate medical treatment and the remaining 392 having injuries from bruises, scrapes, kicks and/or bites. After a question from Basque senator Jon Iñarritu some months later, the Spanish Ministry of the Interior recognised that the number was much lower and stated that the number of police officers injured was 111. During the hearings of the trial of Catalonia independence leaders in February 2019, Saenz de Santamaría reduced that figure further to 93, down from the initial 400. In a document given to the judge investigating the police action during the day of the referendum in Barcelona, Spanish police reported around 40 injuries, including officers who acted in Girona and Sabadell, which include a "trauma on a finger", a "twisted foot" and a "nose scratch". The Police did not provide medical reports for some of them and did not explain how they were produced.

The Mossos d'Esquadra have been accused of failing to execute the direct order issued by the High Court of Justice of Catalonia and not closing the voting centers before the voting commenced, or not confiscating voting materials on the day of the poll.

According to the final report by the Catalan Health Service (CatSalut) of the Generalitat, 1,066 people were hospitalised in connection with the referendum, of whom 966 were attended to on the day of the referendum and 75 in the following three days. 886 were categorised as mild, 173 as moderate and seven as severe. 10.4% of the injured were over 65 years old and 23 of them were over 79. 2.1% were underage, including 2 children under 11 years old. 12 police officers were also injured, including nine from the Policía Nacional, two from the Guardia Civil and one from the Mossos d'Esquadra. The last injured person was discharged from hospital on 20 October 2017. The Catalan Health Officer planned to sue the general coordinator of the PP, Fernando Martínez-Maíllo, for his qualification as a "great farce" of the total number of injured persons.

On 19 February 2018, in the hearing for the injuries in the village of Castellgalí, a Guardia Civil policeman testified before the judge that he only found passive resistance, thus contradicting a Spanish police statement, which claimed that violence, kicks and spitting took place at that location.

According to a 2020 study, the crackdown by the Spanish state on Catalan activists "increased public sympathy for independence for a short period, and heightened animosity towards actors perceived to be associated or complicit with the Spanish state."

=== Economic effects ===
As of August 2017 the spread between Spanish 10-year government debt and German bonds was close to its narrowest in seven years; however, since the start of July the yield on the Catalan regional government's bonds had jumped by about 50 basis points, signaling unease among investors in regards to the referendum issue.

Stratfor suggested financial market disruption is due to the political upheaval. Predrag Dukic, senior equity sales trader at CM Capital Markets Bolsa, wrote: "The independence movement seeks to paralyze the region with strikes, disobedience, etc., a nightmare scenario for what until yesterday seemed a strong Spanish economic recovery." Markus Schomer, chief global economist at PineBridge Investments, suggested that the uncertainty both in and outside of Spain has made it hard to price the scenarios into final markets so far. Further he commented a strong approval could result in a euro −0.0255% sell off, just as in the aftermath of the German federal election the previous week. "I don't think there is an immediate change coming from that referendum. It'll take quite a bit longer to assess where this is going and what this will mean, how the EU will react, how the Spanish government will react. So I don't think you'll see people adjusting their portfolios on Monday, but you could get the classic knee-jerk, risk-off reaction."

=== Political effect ===
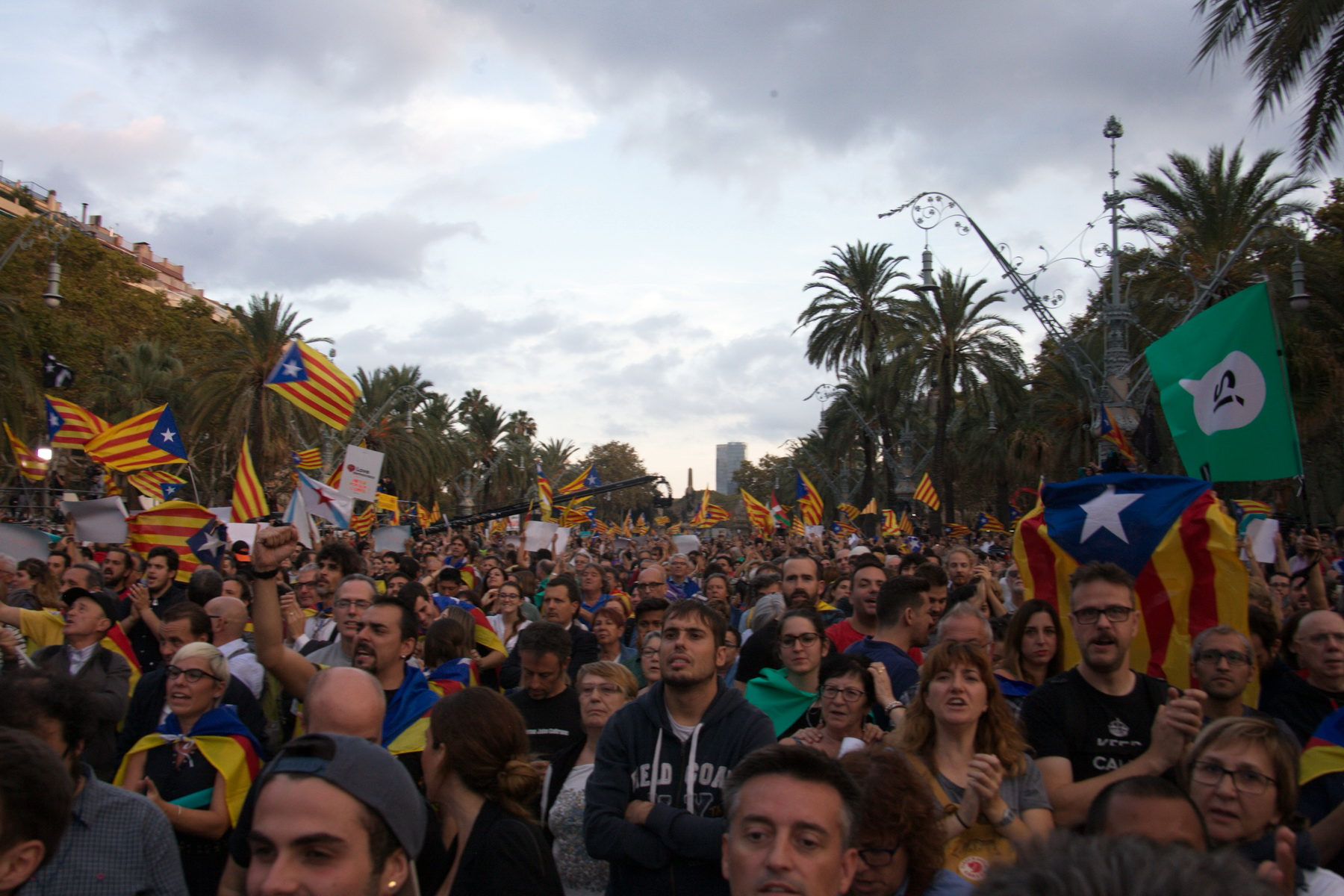
Pro-independence supporters during a rally in Barcelona, 10 October 2017

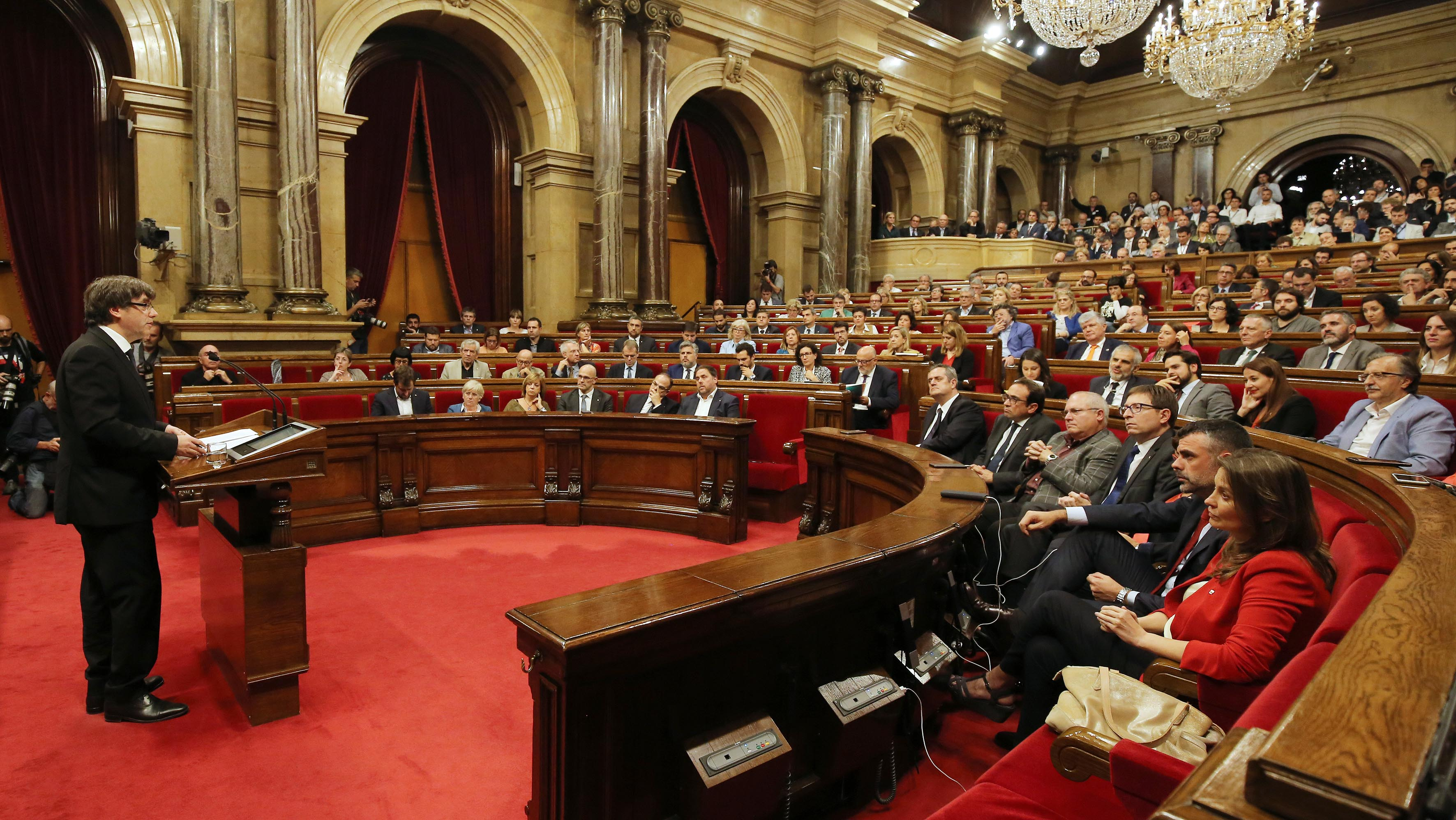
Catalan President Carles Puigdemont gives a speech at the Catalan Parliament in Barcelona on 10 October 2017

On 10 October in a speech in front of the Catalan parliament Puigdemont stated that he considered the referendum results to be valid and in consequence used the following wording: "I assume the mandate of the people for Catalonia to become an independent state in the shape of a republic", before adding that he would "ask Parliament to suspend the effects of the declaration of independence". In response, the Central government made a formal request for him to answer before Monday 16 October 2017 whether he had declared independence, asking specifically for yes or no answer, and clarifying that any answer other than "no" would be interpreted as a "yes". Along with the formal request there was also an offer from the central government negotiated with the Spanish Socialist Workers' Party to evaluate the situation of Catalonia within Spain and to study possible reforms, if needed, to the Spanish Constitution. On 16 October 2017 Puigdemont gave a response that did not address the issue of whether or not there had been a declaration of independence. this triggered a second deadline of 10 am on Thursday 19 October for them to backtrack before direct rule was imposed. The Spanish government subsequently offered to abort the suspension of self-rule if the Catalan government called for regional elections. The response from Puigdemont to the second deadline was again not clear. Since he refused to abandon his independence push, on 21 October the Spanish government initiated the implementation of Article 155 of the Spanish constitution.

On 27 October 2017, the Parliament of Catalonia unilaterally declared independence from Spain. The proposal presented by the pro-independence political parties Junts pel Sí and Popular Unity Candidacy was approved with 70 votes in favor 10 against and 2 blank votes. 55 MPs from the opposition refused to be present during the voting after the legal services of the Catalan Parliament advised that the voting could not take place as the law in which it was based had been suspended by the Constitutional Court. Within hours, the Spanish Senate approved actions proposed by the Spanish government to invoke Article 155 and assume direct control over some of Catalonia's autonomous powers. The measure was passed with 214 votes in favour, 47 against and 1 abstention. The measure is intended to be temporary; its claimed objective being to "re-establish the rule of law" and restore autonomy after new elections. The first measures taken by Spanish Prime Minister Mariano Rajoy after the approval by the senate was to fire the Catalan President Carles Puigdemont and his cabinet, dissolving the Parliament of Catalonia and scheduling fresh Catalan elections on 21 December 2017.

On 16 January 2018, the Spanish Constitutional Court issued a temporary restraining order regarding the work of the Catalan Government commission that investigates the violation of fundamental rights in Catalonia.

== Press coverage and Internet ==
Different sources describe aspects of the events differently according to their political stance. Notable examples include the coverage of Spanish TV channel TVE (Televisión Española) and Catalan channel TV3. TV3 covered the referendum and the police violence regularly while TVE mainly emphasised the Spanish government's position on its legality. TVE media coverage was criticised by Televisión Española information council, calling for the resignation of the entire direction. TV3 has been criticized both within and outside Catalonia as a mouthpiece for the independence movement.

Various media reported on fake images of police violence against civilians that were posted in social networks. They included images of people injured in other events, including footage from strikes and anti-austerity protests 4–5 years prior, Turkish police charges and protests by miners. The news sites Okdiario and Periodista Digital were also accused of falsely trying to discredit some of those involved in police violence episodes.

Some non-Spanish media outlets have criticized the Mariano Rajoy's government, police violence against civilians or Spain's media coverage, including The Guardian, The Independent, Al-Jazeera, The Daily Telegraph, and The New York Times.

The Spanish newspaper El País argued that "the network of fake-news producers that Russia has employed to weaken the United States and the European Union is now operating at full speed on Catalonia", involving a network of Russian media outlets and social network bots which, according to the argument, aimed to influence local and global discussion of events. Later investigations by Medium-DFRL said it found support for some but not all of the arguments made by Spanish outlets. It is argued that the goal was not specifically to support Catalan independence but to "foment divisions to gradually undermine Europe's democracy and institutions" and at discrediting Spanish legal and political authorities, while Russian authorities have denied that Russian actors had any involvement.

== In popular culture ==
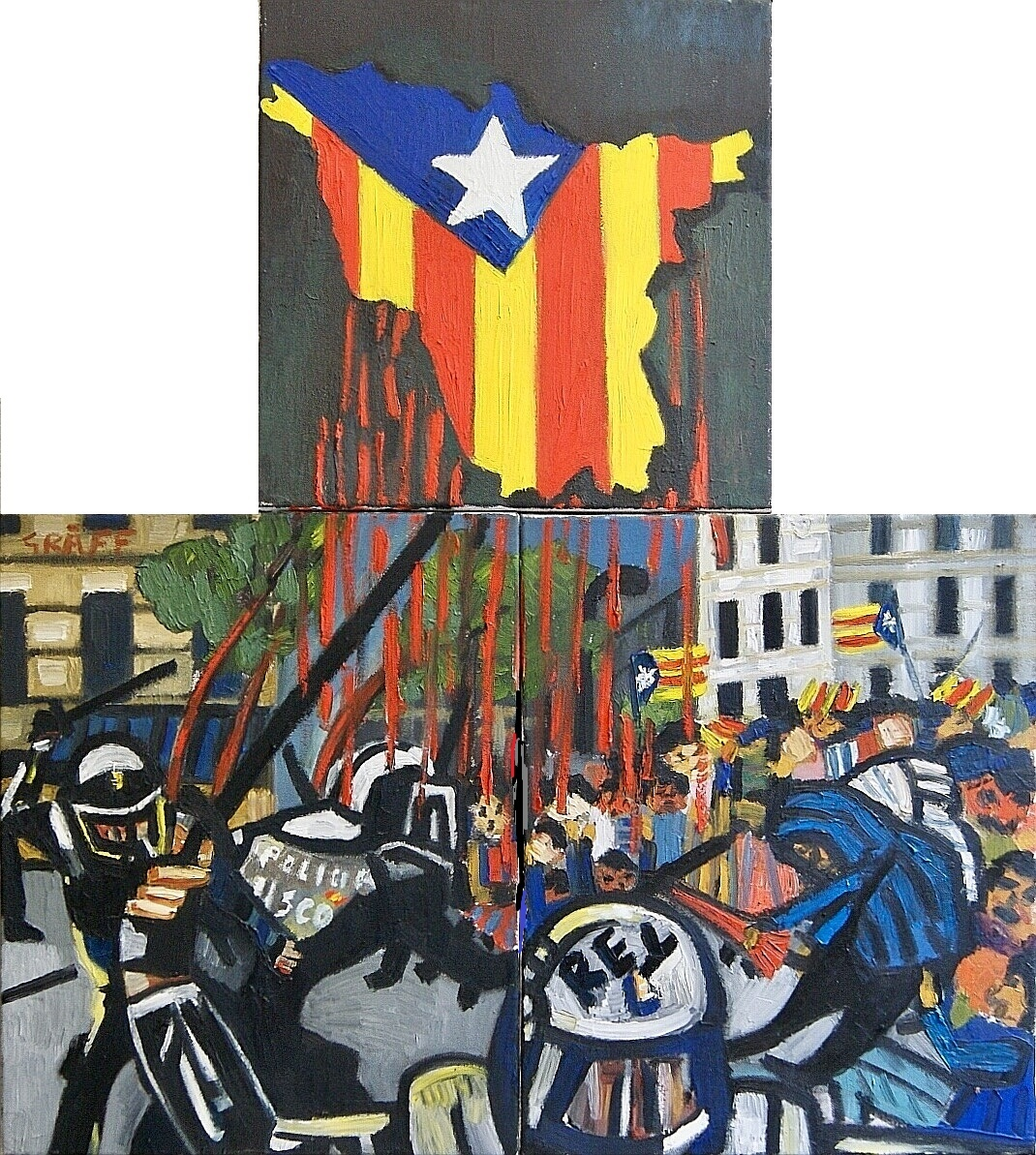
Katalanisches Tryptichon, painted by Matthias Laurenz Gräff

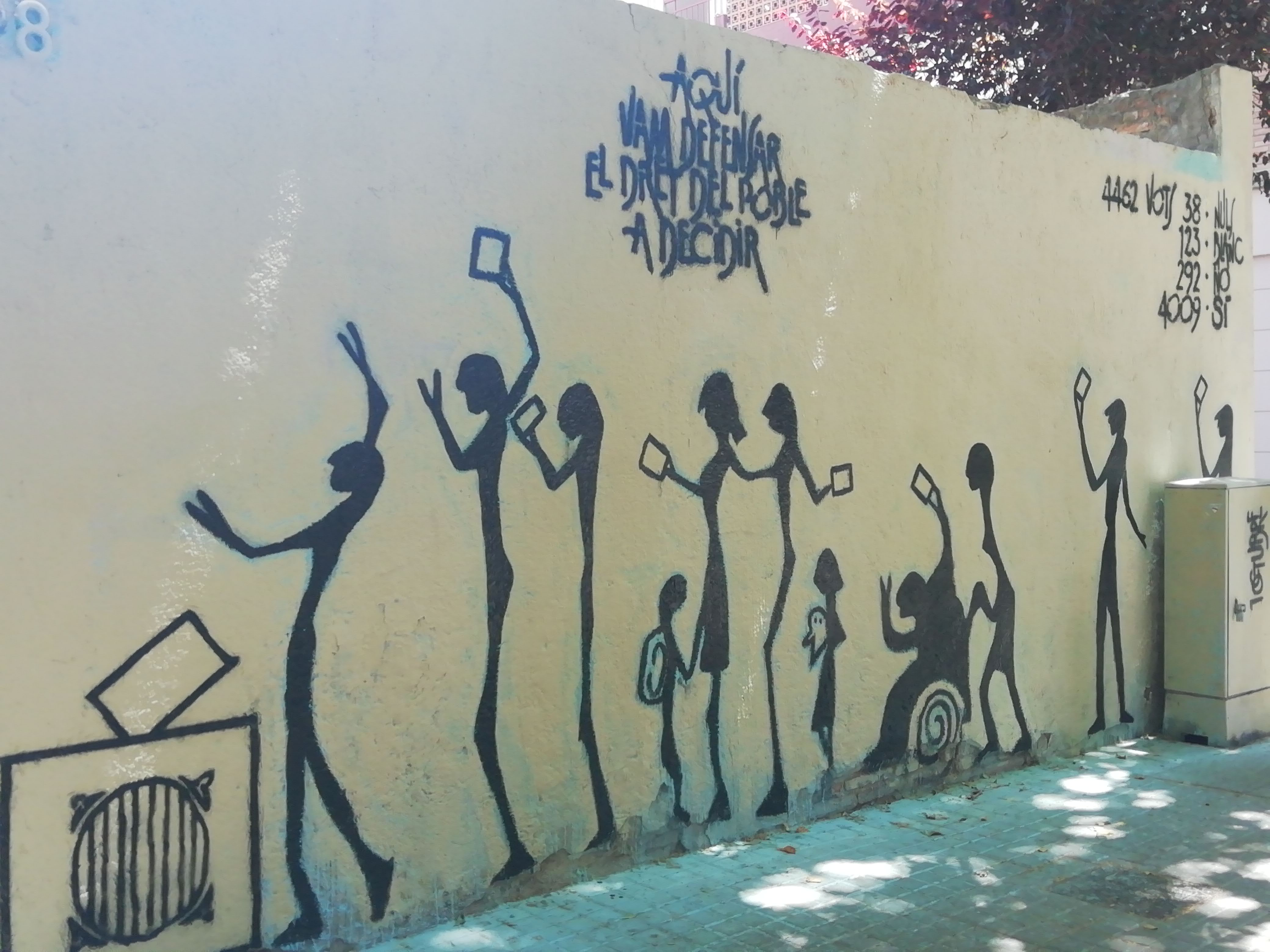
1-O commemorative mural in front of a polling station in the Sant Andreu district of Barcelona. Votes: 4009 Yes, 292 No, 123 blank, 28 null

Several documentaries have been made about the day of the referendum, the most known ones being 1-O produced by Mediapro, El primer dia d'octubre produced by La Directa and released for free in YouTube. and L'endemà produced by Massa D'Or produccions. All three were produced by independentist production companies and were criticised for being too propagandistic and biased, the last one even received harsh criticism by independentist politicians and journalists. Another well known documentary about the same topic but with a more unbiased approach was Dos Catalunyas directed by Gerardo Olivares and Álvaro Longoria.

Many books about the topic were published as well, including Operació urnes ("Operation Ballot Boxes"), explaining how the ballot boxes were distributed around Catalonia, and Dies que duraran anys ("Days That Will Last for Years"), a photo book by Jordi Borràs. Those two being the first and the third top-sellers in the category of non-fiction in Catalan language during the Diada de Sant Jordi of 2018.

Several Catalan groups also composed songs specially dedicated to that day, including Agafant l'horitzó (Catching the horizon) by Txarango and Rojos y separatistas (Red and separatists) by Lágrimas de Sangre. Some international groups used images from the police violence during the day of the referendum in their concerts and music videos, including A Sound of Thunder and Steven Patrick Morrissey.

On 15 June, the exhibition 55 Ballot Boxes for Freedom opened in Brussels, with artwork inspired by the ballot boxes of the Catalan referendum.

Netflix used images from the police action during the day of the referendum to promote the Black Mirror series in Spain.

== In 2020–2024 ==
In February 2020, the Catalan nationalist-led government and the Spanish left-wing coalition government agreed to start a dialogue on Catalonia's political future. Included in Catalan nationalists' two points was a retroactive legalization of the 2017 independence referendum. The central government's plan aims rather at a negotiation on the region's financial and political autonomy within the current legal framework. Fifteen representatives began talks with a discussion of the history of the Catalan crisis. Despite disagreement on when it began, the two sides concurred that their common political opponent, the People's Party, bore the overall responsibility in its fight against the Statute of Autonomy. It was agreed that negotiations would continue, with plans for monthly meetings and plenary sessions every six months, although this has been followed by a continued internal conflict within the nationalist parties, a fraction of which wishes no dialogue beyond a new legally binding referendum. The COVID-19 pandemic in Spain cancelled these plans.

In the 2024 Catalan elections pro-independence parties lost control of the government. Spanish commentators saw this as the end of the independence "process" for Catalonia. An amnesty was declared for crimes committed in relationship to the referendum in the same year.

== See also ==
- 2014 Scottish independence referendum
- 2017 Catalan regional election
- 2017 Kurdistan Region independence referendum
- 2018 New Caledonian independence referendum
- Catalan general strike
- Catalan independence movement
- Catalan nationalism
- Catalan Republic
- Catalan declaration of independence
- History of Catalonia
- Politics of Catalonia
- Catalan Revolt
