= Opening of the Judicial Year =

Solemn annual event in Spain

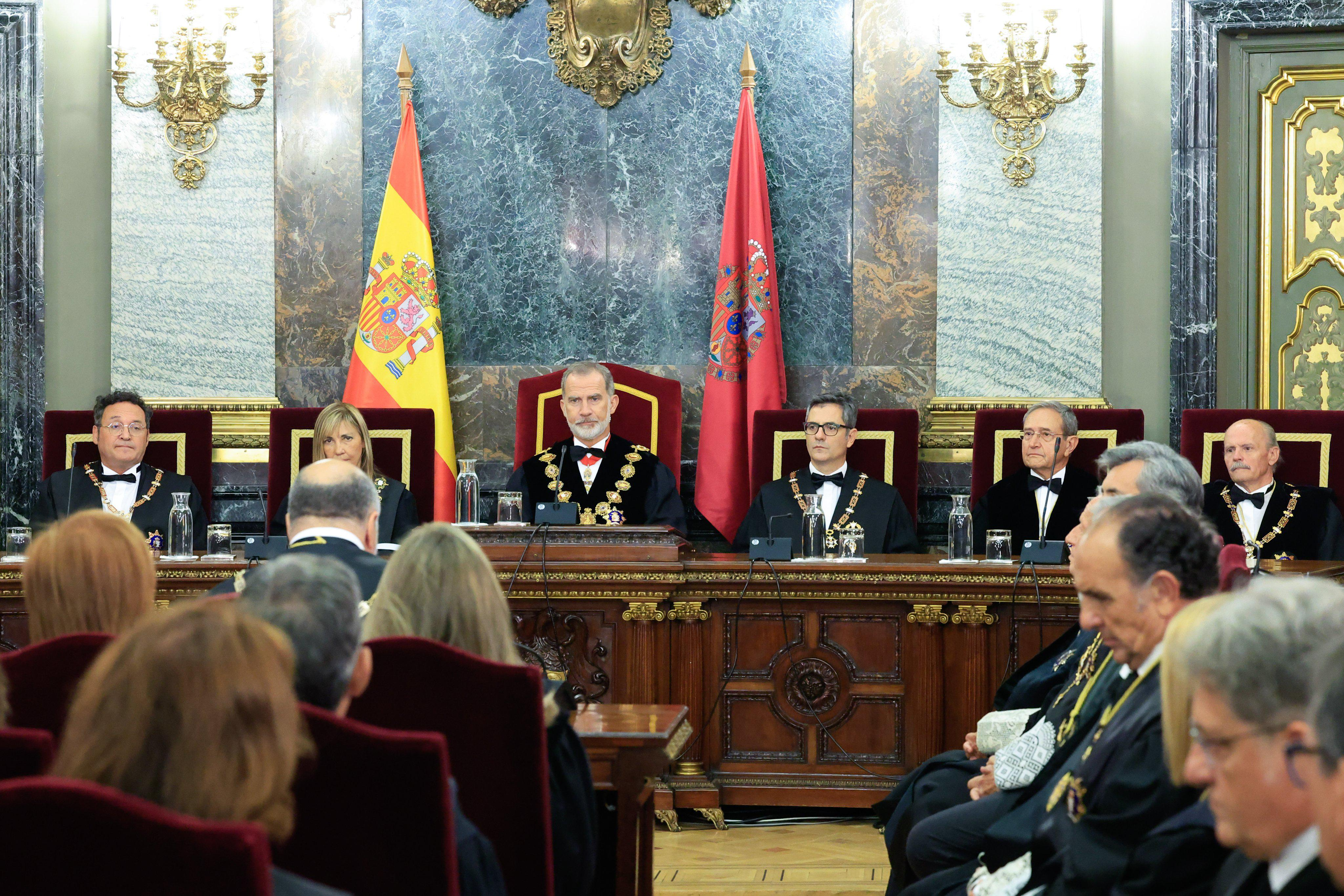
2024-25 Opening of the Courts

The Opening of the Judicial Year, also called Opening of the Courts, is a solemn event that takes place every year in the Plennary Hall of the Supreme Court of Spain in front of the most relevant judicial and political authorities. This act, that marks the start of the judicial activities after the summer break, is chaired by the Monarch —in whose name justice is administered— and takes place in the first days of September, since the judicial year in Spain runs from September 1st, or the following business day, to July 31st of each calendar year.

Likewise, the President of the Supreme Court, the members of the General Council of the Judiciary, the judges of the Supreme Court, the Minister of Justice, the Prosecutor General of the State, the presidents of the High Courts of Justice and other judicial and political authorities of the country attend this event.

== Event and attire ==
The event begins with the arrival of the Monarch at the Convent of the Salesas Reales. After being welcomed at the entrance by the Governing Chamber of the Supreme Court, the sovereign dons the corresponding attire and enters the Plenary Hall. After opening the solemn hearing, the monarch gives the floor to the Secretary of the Governing Chamber, who proceeds to read the rules governing the event, currently established in Article 181 of Organic Law 6/1985, of July 1st, on the Judiciary. Following this, the Prosecutor General, first, and then the President of the Supreme Court and of the General Council of the Judiciary, present their respective institutions' annual reports. After the speeches, the monarch declares the judicial year open and adjourns the session.

Due to the solemnity of the ceremony, judges, prosecutors, lawyers and other legal professions attend wearing the robes corresponding to their respective offices, as well as their insignias and decorations they have received for their services. Thus, it is common to see attendees wearing this attire and, in many cases, wearing some of the ranks of the Order of Saint Raymond of Peñafort.

=== Collars of Justice ===
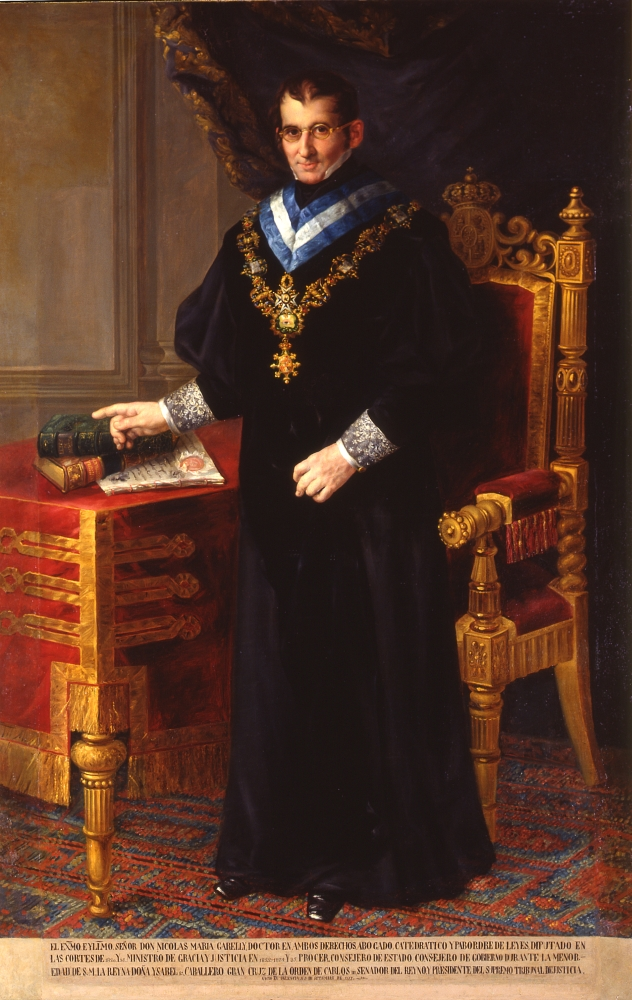
Nicolás María Garelli, president of the Supreme Court from 1843 to 1850, wearing the Grand Collar of Justice.

In addition to the collar of the Order of Saint Raymond of Peñafort, which can be worn by those who have been decorated with the Grand Cross of the Order, at this event it is possible to see two other collars, known as the "Collars of Justice". These are worn by the Monarch and the President of the Supreme Court, as the highest representatives of the Judiciary of Spain.

The first of the collars dates back to 1844, when the Under-Secretary of Grace and Justice, Manuel Ortiz de Zúñiga Montemayor, approved a royal order establishing the design of the Great Collar of Justice and another smaller one, for more common use by the president of the Supreme Court. Although there is no evidence that the small collar was made, the large one was made and is still in use today.

On the other hand, there is another collar, sometimes erroneously called the Great Collar of Justice, which is the one worn by the Monarch. This collar, which is simply called the Collar of Justice or the Collar of the Minister of Justice, was made in 1871 by the jeweler Francisco Moratilla. Since 1983, the monarch uses the Collar of the Minister of Justice and not the Great Collar of Justice, as was done during the reign of Alfonso XIII (and as Juan Carlos I did in 1976).

== Opening in other courts ==
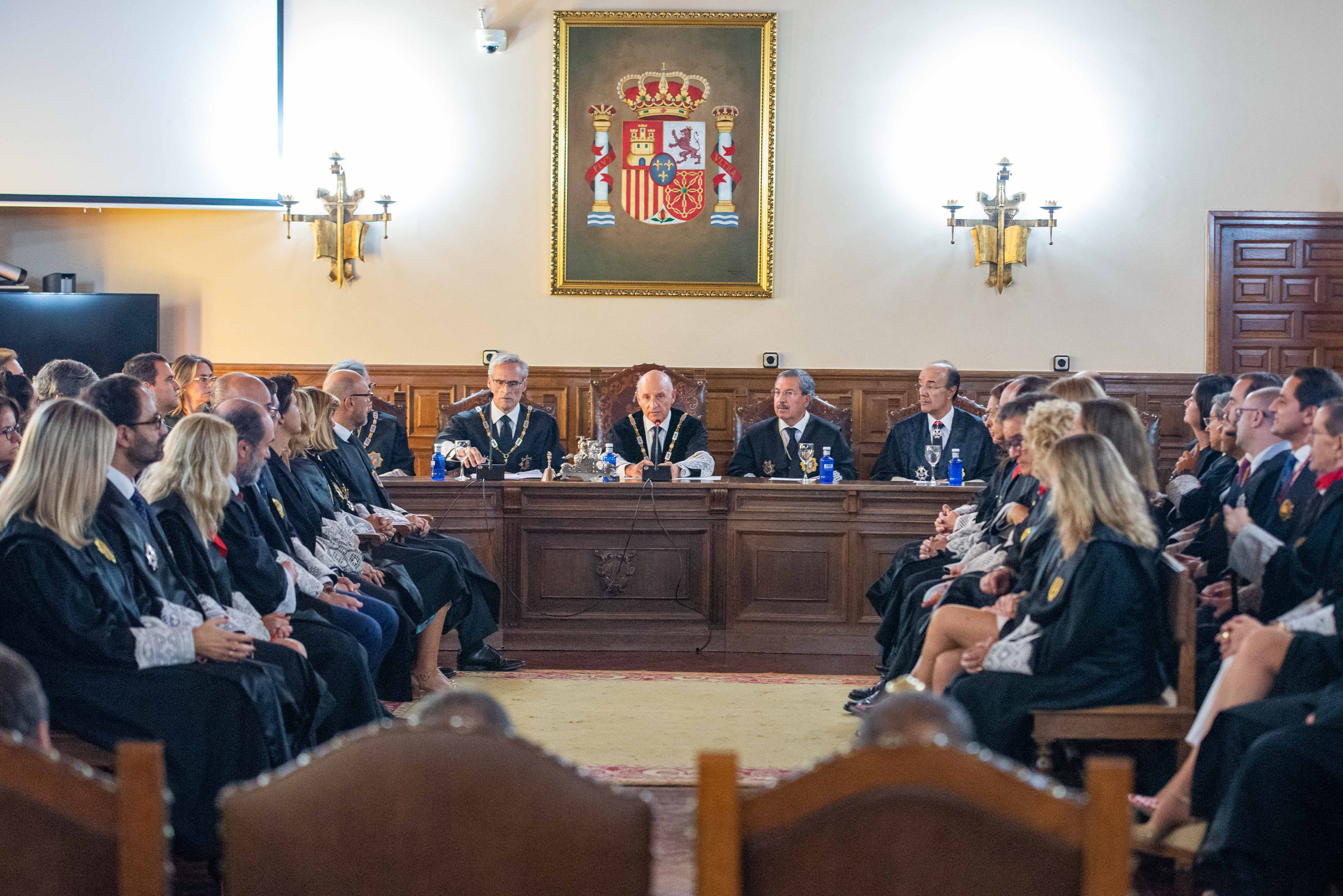
2019 Opening of the Courts ceremony at the High Court of Justice of Castile-La Mancha, Spain

After the solemn opening in the Supreme Court, the High Courts of Justice carry out a similar act, chaired by the president of the corresponding court and with the corresponding senior prosecutor reporting on the actions of the Public Prosecutor's Office in the region.

Similar events also take place in other countries, such as Canada, Peru or Equatorial Guinea, among others, and in international courts such as the European Court of Human Rights.

== History ==
The origin of this tradition is in the Council of the Indies. The custom of reading its internal rules (ordenanzas) during the first session of the year was established in this Council. Later, by Royal Decree of 19 November 1790, King Charles IV extended this practice to the inaugural sessions of the Council of Castile.

The tradition continued with the establishment of the Supreme Court in 1812 and extended to minor courts throughout the country. In the 1830s and 1840s, the act began to be formally detailed; thus, the Rules of the Courts of 1835 read as follows:

On the first business day of each year, the court of justice will be solemnly opened, with all magistrates meeting behind open doors in one of the courtrooms, with the mandatory attendance of all their subordinates. After the clerk has read Chapters 1, 3, 4, and 6 of the provisional rules of 26 September 1835, and these rules or those that will govern from then on, the president (regent) will deliver or read a speech on the administration of justice, recommending to all the magistrates the fulfillment of their respective obligations.

— Article 12 of the 1835 Courts' Rules

A decade later the speeches were homogenized, establishing the following rules by circular of the Minister of Justice in 1845:

1. These speeches shall contain an account of the principal matters the court has undertaken during the preceding year, both in the contentious aspect, specific to the chambers of justice, and in the administrative-judicial aspect of the full court, or the governing chamber, as the case may be.
2. These speeches shall also describe the state of the administration of justice throughout the territory, the reasons that hinder its expeditious course, any notable abuses observed, and the measures adopted by the court or proposed to the Government to remove obstacles or eradicate abuses.
3. A summary shall be made of the total number of all kinds of business handled and pending, both contentious and administrative, including among the latter the number of magistrates and judges sworn to exercise their positions, the number of court subordinates who have taken office, and the number of clerks sworn to perform their duties.
4. At the end of the speech, a statement equal to the attached model will be placed, including all the details expressed in the previous rule.

— Royal Order of the Minister of Justice of 17 September 1845.

Later, in 1848, the concept of "subordinate" established in 1835 was clarified, to include "rapporteurs, the court secretary, the court clerks, the chancellor registrar, the archivist, the appraiser, the procurators, and the doormen and bailiffs." It was also clarified that "Her Majesty's prosecutors [...] the first-instance judges [...] the court clerks of the capital and the governing board of the procuradores association [...] and the bar associations" were also required to attend. Likewise, this rule succinctly regulated the protocol, indicating that the prosecutor should sit on the right side of the court, immediately after the last judge, followed by the prosecutors, "observing among the individuals of each of these classes the respective category and seniority".

The first monarch to preside over a court opening ceremony was Queen Isabella II, on 2 January 1856. Later, in 1868, it was established that the opening would take place after the holiday period, establishing this custom on 15 September each year. It was not customary, however, for monarchs —or the head of state in non-monarchical periods— to preside over the event, delegating the representation of the Crown to the Minister of Grace and Justice; proof of this is that Isabella II only did so on two occasions (1856 and 1862), while Alfonso XII —in 1876— and Alfonso XIII —in 1925— only presided over it once. The presence of the sovereign has been customary since the reign of Juan Carlos I.

== Bibliography ==
- Ramírez Jiménez, David (2014). "Los collares de la Justicia: un estudio aclaratorio" [The Collars of Justice: A Clarifying Study]. Hidalguía: la revista de genealogía, nobleza y armas (in Spanish). 362: 5–54. ISSN 0018-1285.
