= First Chamber of the Supreme Court (Spain) =

Chamber for Civil Matters of the Supreme Court
- Sala Primera del Tribunal Supremo
- Established: 1812
- Jurisdiction: Spain
- Location: Convento de las Salesas Reales, Madrid
- Composition method: Court of final instance (civil)
- Authorised by: Supreme Court of Spain
- Website: www.poderjudicial.es

President
- Currently: Ignacio Sancho Gargallo

The First Chamber of the Supreme Court of Spain, commonly referred to as the Civil Chamber (Spanish: Sala Primera, de lo Civil), is the chamber that concludes the civil jurisdiction by deciding, as a court of last instance, appeals in cassation and review in civil matters.

It is also competent to hear certain civil liability claims against high-ranking State officials for acts carried out in the exercise of their office.

Within the structure of the Supreme Court of Spain —which is divided into five jurisdictional chambers— the First Chamber is the body competent for civil and commercial matters and serves as the highest court in that order throughout the national territory (excluding matters of a constitutional nature, which are reserved to the Constitutional Court of Spain).

Since March 2025 its president is Judge Ignacio Sancho Gargallo.

== History ==
The origin of the Supreme Court dates back to the Constitution of Cádiz of 1812, which provided for the creation of a Supreme Tribunal of Justice to unify the judicial power. Its effective establishment took place during the reign of Queen Isabella II: the Royal Decree of 24 March 1834 abolished the ancient Councils of Castile, Indies, War and Finance, and instituted the Supreme Court divided into three chambers (one for overseas affairs —named the Supreme Court of Spain and the Indies—, one for war and navy matters, and a third for finance).

Later, the Provisional Law on the Organization of the Judiciary of 15 September 1870 configured the Supreme Court with a Governing Chamber and four judicial chambers, assigning civil jurisdiction to the First Chamber.

During the Second Spanish Republic the Decree of 6 May 1931 reorganised the Supreme Court into five chambers: First Chamber (Civil), Second Chamber (Criminal), Third and Fourth Chambers (Administrative), and Fifth Chamber (Labour).

The 1931 Constitution also added a Sixth Military Justice Chamber, which assumed the competences of the former Supreme Council of War and Navy. This organisation was altered during the dictatorship of Francisco Franco (the Labour Chamber was suppressed), but the Law of 17 July 1945 restored the composition of five chambers of the Supreme Court.

The Spanish Constitution of 1978 (art. 123) recognised the Supreme Court as the highest judicial body in all orders —civil, criminal, administrative, labour and military— with jurisdiction throughout Spain. Pursuant to the Constitution, Organic Law 6/1985 of 1 July on the Judiciary maintained the division of the Supreme Court into five jurisdictional chambers. The First Chamber, for Civil Matters, is thus configured as the apex of the civil jurisdiction, responsible for appeals against judgments of lower courts in this area and for certain special procedures attributed by law.

== Jurisdiction and powers ==
The powers of the First Chamber of the Supreme Court are set out in article 56 of the Organic Law of the Judiciary (LOPJ). In particular, the First Chamber has competence over:

- Cassation, review and other extraordinary appeals in civil matters provided for by law.
- Civil liability claims against high-ranking State officials for acts performed in the exercise of their office, when such claims are directed against: the Prime Minister; the presidents of the Congress of Deputies and the Senate; the President of the Supreme Court and of the General Council of the Judiciary; the President of the Constitutional Court; members of the Government; members of the Congress and Senate; members of the CGPJ; judges of the Constitutional Court and of the Supreme Court; the presidents of the Audiencia Nacional and of its chambers and the presidents of the High Courts of Justice; the Attorney General of the State and the Supreme Court prosecutors; the president and counsellors of the Court of Auditors; the president and counsellors of the Council of State; the Defender of the People; and the president and counsellors of an autonomous government, when so determined by the corresponding Statute of Autonomy.
- Civil actions against magistrates of the Audiencia Nacional or of the High Courts of Justice for acts committed in the exercise of their functions.

In addition, article 55-bis of the LOPJ attributes to the First Chamber the investigation and trial of civil actions against certain members of the royal family: the queen consort (or her spouse), the Prince or Princess of Asturias and their consort, as well as any monarch who has abdicated and their consort.

== Composition ==
Under the Law on Judicial Districts and Judicial Establishment (Ley de Demarcación y Planta Judicial), the First Chamber of the Supreme Court is composed of a president and nine judges (magistrates). Following appointments made in 2025, the First Chamber has reached the full complement provided by law (ten members: one president and nine magistrates).

The current membership is as follows:

- President: Ignacio Sancho Gargallo.
- Magistrates (by order of seniority in the Chamber):
  - Rafael Sarazá Jimena
  - Pedro José Vela Torres
  - María de los Ángeles Parra Lucán
  - José Luis Seoane Spiegelberg
  - Antonio García Martínez
  - Manuel Almenar Belenguer
  - Raquel Blázquez Martín
  - Nuria Auxiliadora Orella
