= Álvaro García Ortiz =

Spanish prosecutor

The Most Excellent Álvaro García Ortiz
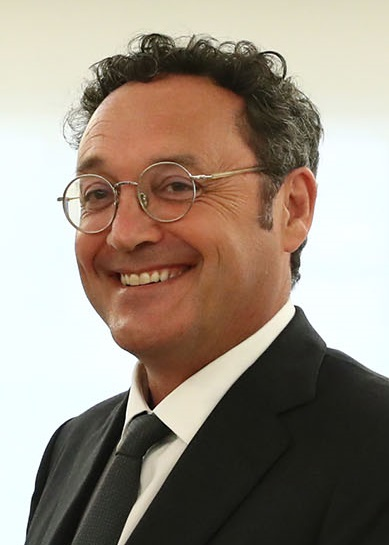
- García Ortiz in 2024

Prosecutor General of the State
- In office 2 August 2022 – 10 December 2025
- Preceded by: Dolores Delgado
- Succeeded by: Teresa Peramato Martín

Chief Prosecutor of the Technical Secretariat of the Prosecutor General's Office
- In office 5 March 2020 – 2 August 2022
- Preceded by: Fernando Rodríguez Rey
- Succeeded by: Ana Isabel García León

Personal details
- Born: 16 December 1967 (age 58) Lumbrales, Spain
- Education: University of Valladolid

Álvaro García Ortiz (born 16 December 1967) is a Spanish prosecutor who served as Prosecutor General of the State from 2022 to 2025, when he was forced to resign after being found guilty by the Supreme Court of revealing secrets in a case involving the partner of Madrilenian president Isabel Díaz Ayuso. Prior to 2022, García Ortiz was chief prosecutor at the Prosecution Ministry's Technical Secretariat.

== Professional career ==
García Ortiz was born on 16 December 1967 in Lumbrales and graduated with a degree in law from the University of Valladolid, then he began working for the Mahón prosecutor's office in 1998. Two years later, he was assigned to the Santiago de Compostela's Prosecutor's Office and, in 2004, he was promoted to the Prosecutor's Office in the High Court of Justice of Galicia, as an environmental prosecutor. From this position, he led the public prosecution in the Prestige oil spill.

In 2018, he was elected by his peers to be part of the Prosecutors' Council of Spain, an advisory body to the Prosecutor General of the State.

In 2020, after spending around two decades working in environmental law, prosecutor general Dolores Delgado promoted him to chief prosecutor of the Prosecutor General's Office's Technical Secretariat.

García Ortiz is part of the management team of the European Judges for Democracy and Liberty. In the past, he also wrote as a columnist for the Spanish media and in technical publications.

=== Prosecutor General ===
On 19 July 2022, after Dolores Delgado announced she would resign for health reasons, it was revealed that García Ortiz would be the government's nominee to replace her. On 21 July, the General Council of the Judiciary endorsed his nomination by a vote of twelve to seven.

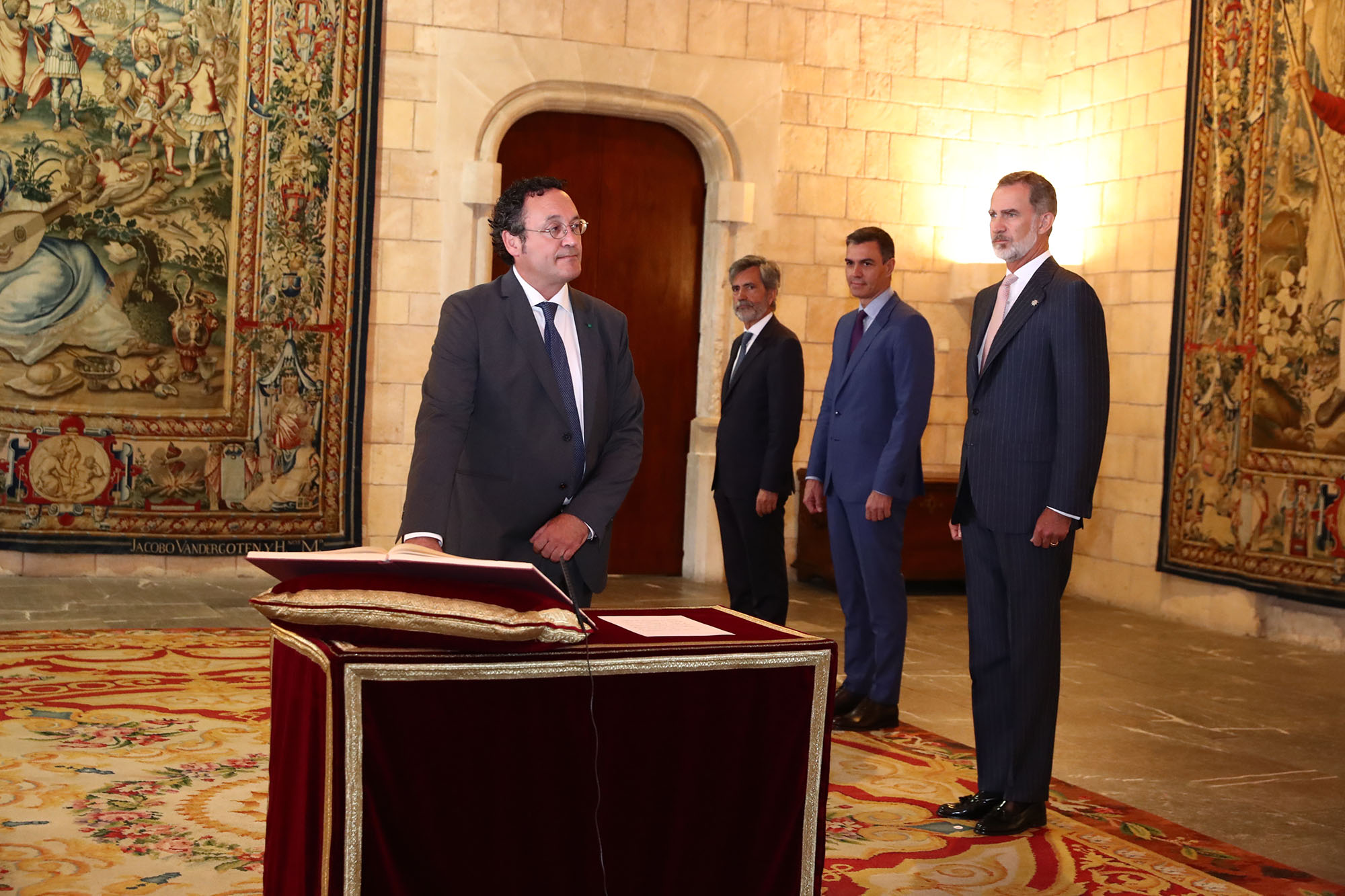
García Ortiz being inaugurated Prosecutor General

Following a review period by the Justice Commission of the Congress of Deputies, the Council of Ministers appointed him Prosecutor General on 1 August 2022. The next day, he took office before the King, in the Royal Palace of La Almudaina.

After Pedro Sánchez formed his third government, the Council of Ministers asked that García Ortiz's suitability for office be reviewed. After the request was granted, the General Council of the Judiciary found, in a non-binding report, that he was unsuitable for office. This was the first time in Spanish democratic history that the government's candidate for Prosecutor General had been rejected. Despite this, the government re-appointed García Ortiz on 27 December 2023.

=== Emails leaking and conviction ===
On 16 October 2024, the Supreme Court started an inquiry on the prosecutor general for suspicions that he or his office could have leaked to the press private emails related to a tax fraud case of the boyfriend of the president of the Community of Madrid, Isabel Díaz Ayuso. Fourteen days later the Civil Guard searched the Prosecutor's Office looking for evidence of the crime.

The trial took place between November 3 and 13, 2025, and forty witnesses testified, including González Amador himself (boyfriend of Madrid's regional leader), journalists, prosecutors and politicians. On 20 November 2025, the Supreme Court found García Ortiz guilty of leaking private information and it banned him from holding public office for two years and also ordered him to pay a fine of 7300 euros and additional 10,000 euros in damages to González Amador.

He resigned on 24 November. The following day Teresa Peramato Martín was announced as Government's candidate to succeed him.

After his resignation, in January 2026 he joined the Labour Section of the Prosecutor's Office of the Supreme Court.
