= Council of State (Spain) =

Supreme advisory body of Spain

Coordinates: 40°24′53″N 3°42′47″W

- Consejo de Estado

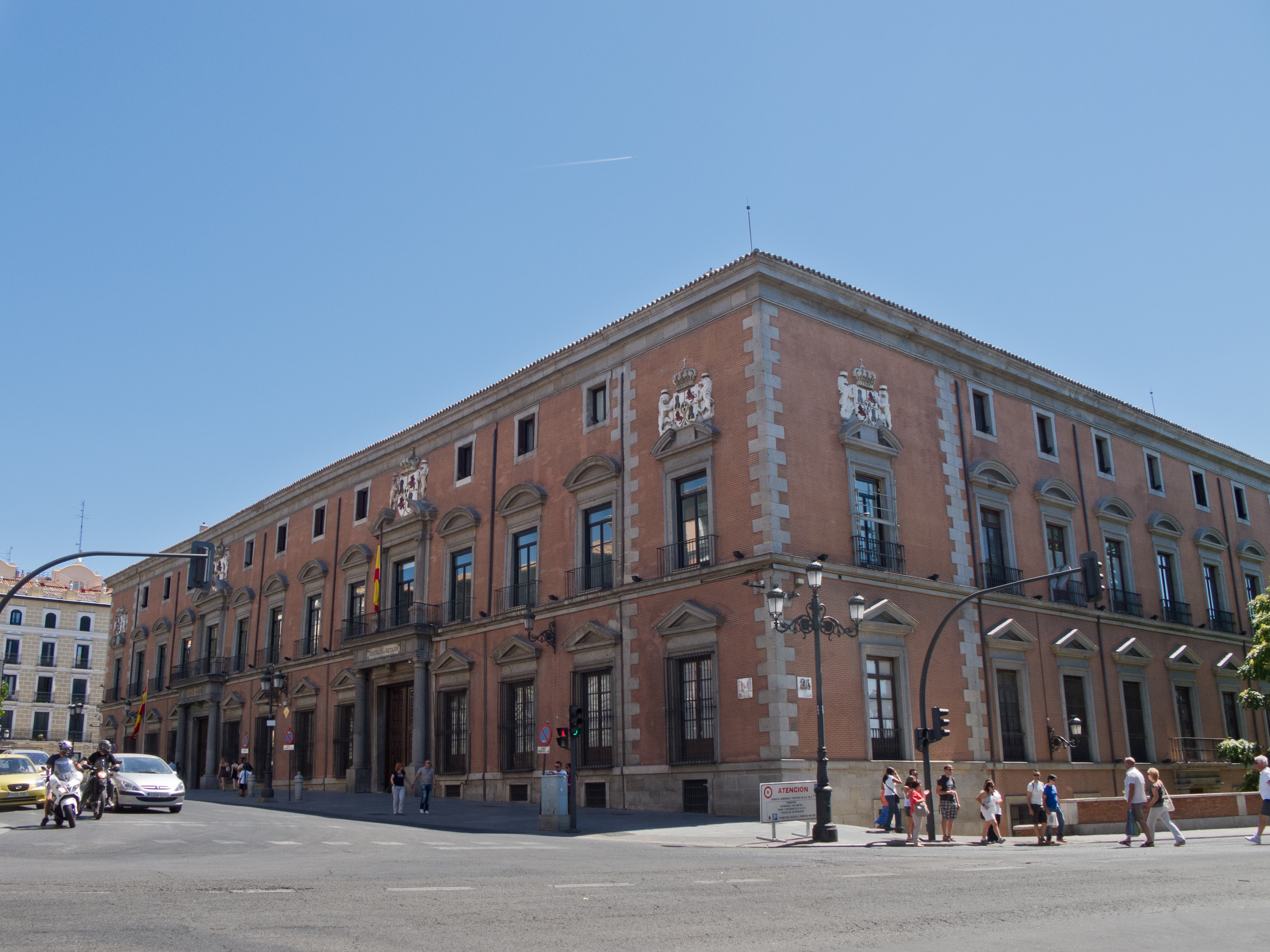
- Formation: 1526; 500 years ago
- Type: consultative body
- Headquarters: Palace of the Councils, Calle Mayor, 79, Madrid, Spain
- President: Carmen Calvo (since 2024)
- Budget: € 14.69 million (2025)
- Employees: 142 (31 December 2023)
- Website: www.consejo-estado.es

The Council of State (Spanish: Consejo de Estado), is the supreme advisory body of the Spanish Government. It was established in 1526 by King Charles I (V of the Holy Roman Empire) to advise him on foreign policy. Since the 19th century, the Council advises the government in all policies. It also advises the Monarch in the exercise of its royal prerogatives.

== History ==
The council as the body through which the monarchs ruled their territories has its origins in the Crown of Castile with the creation of the Council of Castile in 1385 by King John II. Other peninsular kingdoms like Navarre also created its own council in 1481 by Queen Joan II and in Aragón in 1494 by King Ferdinand the Catholic.

=== Foreign affairs council (1522–1834) ===
King Charles I inherited vast territories through Europe and decided to create a new council called «of State» due to the enormous foreign policy that marked his reign. This council started its duties in 1526 when Sultan Suleiman the Magnificent threatened Spanish possessions in Austria.

It was the only Council that did not have a president, because it was the King himself who assumed that function. His advisors were not specialists in laws but experts in international relations, such as the Duke of Alba or Nicolás Perrenot. The councilors were, therefore, members of the high nobility and the high clergy. In times of Philip II sometimes the monarch did not preside over the councils and, in his place, sent to its secretary Antonio Perez.

It had a great influence during the reigns of Charles I and Philip II and later during the regency of Mariana of Austria (1665–1675). The reforms of Philip V (1700–1746) emptied its actual power, although Manuel de Godoy wished to revive it in 1792.

Unlike the Council of Castile, in which the King listened to the councilors and executed the conclusions presented to him, in the Council of State was the King himself who exposed the points to be discussed, listened to his advisors and, subsequently, the same monarch made the decisions that were to be made.

=== Supreme consultative council of the Government (1812–today) ===
The Council of State has existed intermittently during 19th and 20th centuries. The Constitution of 1812 granted the King the executive power and established that this was the only council to which the King could go to ask for advice. This obligation was over in 1814 when King Ferdinand VII restored absolutism. The Constitution configured the council as a King-control-body forcing the King to take to the council important issues like the sanction of the laws, the declaration of war or the conclusion of treaties that in any case the sovereign could undertake without having previously "heard" the council.

With the death of the King in 1833, the year later the council was abolished and the Royal Council of Spain and the Indies was created instead as a superior consultative body but was abolished in 1836. In 1845, under the name of Royal Council the body was restored and for the first time the Presidency of the council was granted to the Prime Minister. In 1858 the original name recovered and since then the council has been regulated by numerous laws, the latest in 1980.

Nowadays the Council of State continues being the main and superior consultative body of the Government, but since 1991 some economic and social competencies have been transferred to the Economic and Social Council.

== Organization ==
The Council of State has its headquarters in the Palace of the Councils, Madrid. (LOCE § 1.3) The Constitution and the 1980 Council of State Organic Act establishes the Council as the supreme consultative body of the Government. As its main capacity it oversees the observance of the Constitution and the rest of the legal system by giving advice either when established by the law or required by the government. (LOCE § 2.1).

The council comprises the president, who is appointed by the Council of Ministers on the advice of the Prime Minister after appearing before Congress of Deputies, and three categories of Councilors:

- Permanent Councilors,
  who are appointed for life or until voluntary retirement by the government amongst present or former ministers; presidents or ministers of regional governments; Councilors of State of other category; members of the advisory councils of the regional governments; Head Counsels of the Council of State; academics of number of the Royal Academies integrated into the Institute of Spain; university professors of law, economy or social science with over 15 years experience, general officers of the Military Legal Corps, State civil servants with fifteen years of service at least that belong to corps or ranks that require a university degree, governors of the Bank of Spain.

Permanent councilors must be in the same number of the existing sections of the Council of State.

- Ex-officio Councilors,
  who are appointed by the position they hold during the duration of their mandates, this are former Prime Ministers (that will serve for life and are also considered permanent councilors); the directors of the Royal Academies, The chairperson of the Economic and Social Council, the Prosecutor General, the Chief of the Defence Staff, the chairperson of the General Council of Lawyers, the chairman of the Ministry of Justice' General Codification Committee, The Solicitor General, the Director of the Center for Political and Constitutional Studies and the Governor of the Bank of Spain.
- Elective Councilors,
  who are ten members appointed by the government for a period of four years amongst former: Members of Parliament; Justices of the Constitutional Court; Judges or Advocates General of the Court of Justice of the European Union; Ombudsmen; Presidents or Members of the General Council of the Judiciary; Ministers or Secretaries of State; Chairpersons of the Court of Auditors; Chiefs of the Defense Staff; Presidents or Ministers of the Regional Governments, Career Ambassadors; Mayors of a provincial capital, Presidents of a Provincial Council, Presidents of the Insular Council; University Rectors.

At least two members must be former presidents of the autonomous communities.

=== Current Council of State ===
- Carmen Calvo, former Deputy Prime Minister of Spain (President of the Council)
- Leopoldo Calvo-Sotelo Ibáñez-Martín, 2n Marquess of Ría de Ribadeo, GE, civil servant and former judge of the European General Court (Secretary-General of the Council)
- Miguel Herrero y Rodríguez de Miñón, former Member of the Congress of Deputies
- Magdalena Valerio, former Minister of Labour, Migrations and Social Security
- María Paz Andrés Sáenz de Santa María, professor of public international law at the University of Oviedo.
- Fernando Ledesma Bartret, former Minister of Justice
- Alberto Aza, diplomat.
- José Luis Manzanares Samaniego, former vice-president of the General Council of the Judiciary.
- María Teresa Fernández de la Vega, First Deputy Prime Minister of Spain from 2004 to 2010.
- Enrique Alonso García, former director of the Real Colegio Complutense
- María Luisa Carcedo, former Minister of Health, Consumer Affairs and Social Welfare
- Santiago Muñoz Machado, director of the Royal Spanish Academy.
- Antón Costas, President of the Economic and Social Council.
- Benigno Pendás García, President of the Royal Academy of Moral and Political Sciences.
- Manuel Pizarro Moreno, President of the Royal Academy of Jurisprudence and Legislation.
- Teresa Peramato Martín, Prosecutor General of the State.
- Teodoro Esteban López Calderón, Chief of the Defence Staff.
- Victoria Ortega Benito, President of the General Council of the Legal Profession.
- Antonio Pau, president of the First Section of the General Codification Commission.
- David Vilas Álvarez, Solicitor General of Spain.
- Yolanda Gómez Sánchez, director of the Center for Political and Constitutional Studies.
- José Luis Escrivá, Governor of the Bank of Spain.
- Juan Carlos Rodríguez Ibarra, former President of the Junta de Extremadura.
- José María Michavila, former Minister of Justice.
- Jordi Guillot i Miravet, former senator.
- María Emilia Casas, former rector of the National University of Distance Education
- Soraya Sáenz de Santamaría, former Deputy Prime Minister of Spain
- Elena Valenciano, former member of the European Parliament.
- Javier Losada, former mayor of La Coruña
- Pedro Sanz, former President of La Rioja
- Juan Carlos Aparicio, former Minister of Labor and Social Affairs.

== See also ==
- Economic and Social Council of Spain
