= High courts of justice (Spain) =

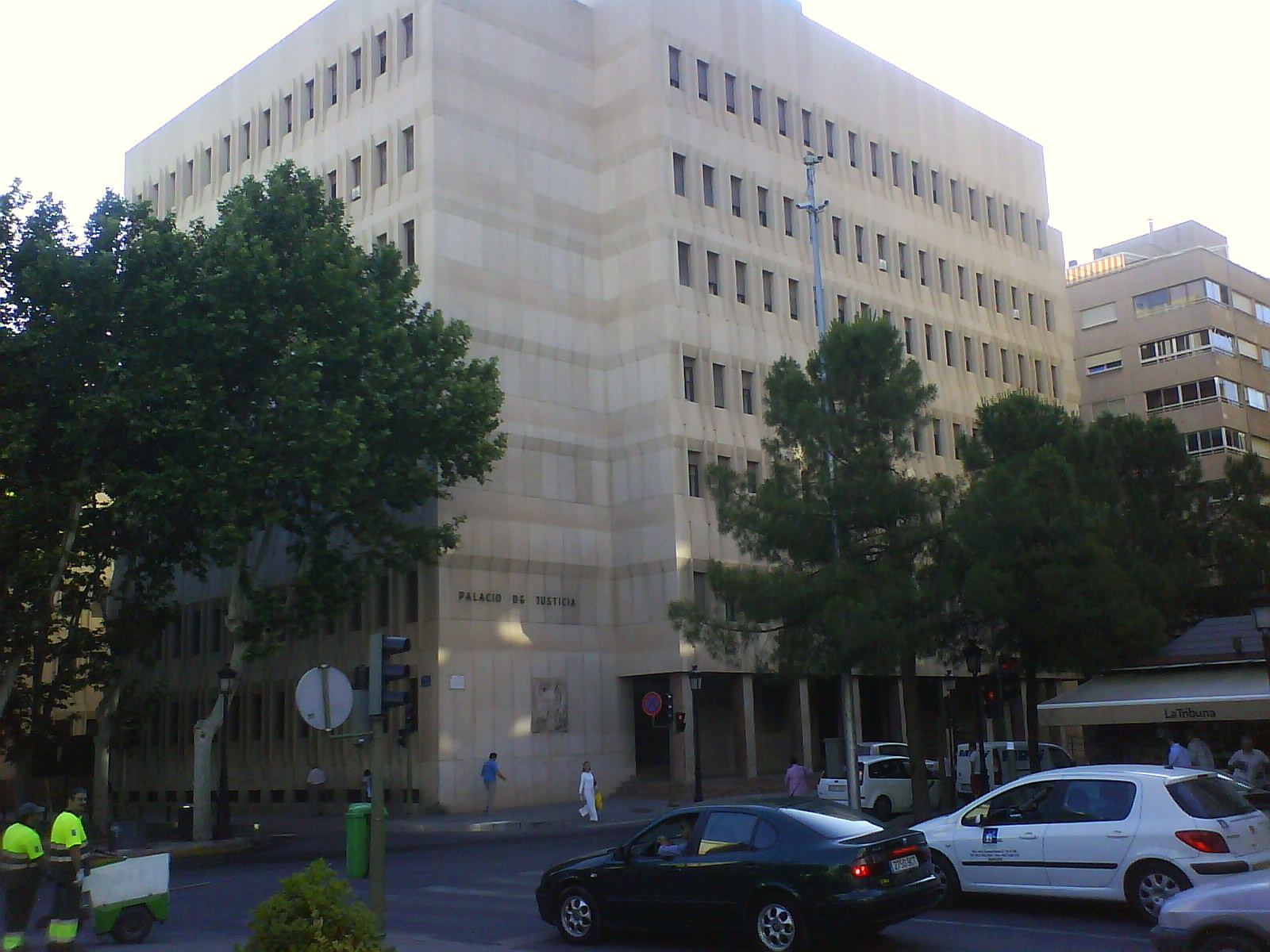
Upper court of Justice of Castile-La Mancha (Albacete).

The superior courts of justice (Spanish: Tribunales Superiores de Justicia), or high courts of justice, are courts within the judicial system of Spain, whose territorial scope covers an autonomous community, as laid down in the Organic Law of Judicial Power (Ley Orgánica del Poder Judicial).

The Spanish Constitution of 1978 defined the territorial organization of the Spanish State as a hierarchy of municipalities, provinces and autonomous communities. The current decentralised administrative structure is known as a "regional state" or, in Spain, "State of the Autonomous Communities" (Estado de las autonomías).

== Judicial powers of the autonomous communities ==
The autonomous communities possess their own legislative and executive powers, conferred on them under their Statute of Autonomy or transferred from the state, in accordance with the Spanish Constitution of 1978.

However, an important qualitative difference between the state of the autonomous communities and a federal state is that the autonomous communities do not have a judicial body of their own that would judge cases according to their own law; instead, the communities exercise the unified judicial power of the Spanish state. Despite this, legislation concerning the autonomous communities envisaged those communities having a judicial role, for instance in the powers of officials in the administration of the judicial system and of material and economic resources. Moreover, the legislative assembly of each community takes part in the appointment of one-third of the members of the civil and penal chamber of the respective superior court of justice: the assembly draws up a shortlist and presents it to the General Council of the Judiciary, which selects one of the candidates for the position in question.

The headquarters of each superior court of justice is stated in the respective statute of autonomy.

== Composition ==
The Superior courts of justice are divided into three Chambers: Civil and Penal, Administrative Disputes, and Social. There is a president of the superior court, a president for each chamber, and a president for each of the sections into which a chamber may be divided. The number of judges varies according to the volume of work.

Judges are selected by competition, taking account of their current judicial position, with places reserved for candidates with special expertise in each branch of the judiciary. One-third of positions in the Civil and Penal Chamber are allocated to lawyers of acknowledged distinction selected by the General Council of the Judiciary from a shortlist drawn up by the legislative assembly of the respective autonomous community.

== Competencies ==
=== Civil and Penal Chamber ===
- In its Civil aspect, the Civil and Penal Chamber acts as a court of appeal and a means of special review of decisions of the civil power vested in the autonomous community, based on claimed infringement of the civil, foral or special law in force within the Community, when the relevant statute of autonomy provides for such review. It also rules on civil liability claims: (a) arising from acts committed by members of the governing council of the community or of its legislative assembly in the exercise of their respective duties, unless the case, according to the statutes of autonomy, is proper to the Supreme Court; (b) arising from acts committed by all or the greater part of the magistrates of a provincial court or of any of its sections. Finally, it rules on issues of competency between different jurisdictional organs of the civil power in the Autonomous Community that do not have another organ overseeing both.
- In its penal aspect, the Civil and Penal Chamber hears criminal cases reserved to the superior court in accordance with the statute of autonomy. It hears and rules on criminal cases against judges, magistrates and tax officials arising from crimes or errors committed in the exercise of their duties, unless the case is proper to the Supreme Court. It hears appeals against judgments of the provincial courts, and any other appeals for which the law provides. Finally, it rules on issues of competency between different jurisdictional organs of the penal power in the autonomous community that do not have another organ overseeing both.

=== Administrative Disputes Chamber ===
The Administrative Disputes Chamber deals with matters relating to acts of local government bodies or the administrative body of the autonomous community, when not proper to provincial administrative dispute courts within the community. It hears appeals against the judgments or acts of those provincial courts, may review their final judgments, and may rule on issues of competency between two or more of them. As provided by relevant regulatory law, it may carry out reviews in order to harmonise doctrine, or in the interests of the law in the field of administrative disputes.

=== Social Chamber ===
The Social Chamber deals with disputes affecting the interests of workers and business people, according to the law and where the scope of the issue is greater than that of a lower court but not beyond the autonomous community. It hears appeals against decisions of lower social courts and decisions related to labour matters of commercial courts (Juzgados de la Mercantil) within the community. It settles labour-related insolvency cases, and may rule on issues of competency between two or more lower social courts.

== List ==
- High Court of Justice of Andalusia, Ceuta and Melilla
- High Court of Justice of Aragon
- High Court of Justice of Asturias
- High Court of Justice of the Balearic Islands
- High court of Justice of the Basque Country
- High Court of Justice of the Canary Islands
- High Court of Justice of Cantabria
- High Court of Justice of Castile and León
- High Court of Justice of Castile-La Mancha
- High Court of Justice of Catalonia
- High Court of Justice of Extremadura
- High Court of Justice of Galicia
- High Court of Justice of La Rioja
- High Court of Justice of Madrid
- High Court of Justice of Murcia
- High Court of Justice of Navarre
- High Court of Justice of Valencia

== See also ==
- National High Court of Spain
