= Law for the De-indexation of the Spanish Economy =

The Law 2/2015, of 30 March, on the De-indexation of the Spanish Economy is a law of the Spanish legal system in force since 2015 by which the prices in whose fixation intervenes, totally or partially, some entity of the public sector are decoupled from the evolution of the CPI. The main objective of this law is to control inflation and thus improve the competitiveness of Spanish products abroad.

== Economic context ==
According to the Global Competitiveness Index of the year the law was passed, the component of competitiveness in which Spain ranked worst was the macroeconomic scenario, a concept within which inflation was included. That said, what Spain is best positioned in, not only within its own indicators, but globally, is precisely in inflation, so this variable is the one that is currently harming Spain's competitiveness the least. Although the law was passed in 2015, the low inflation rate observed in Spain at the time due to the 2008–2014 Spanish financial crisis situation meant that the regulatory development of the rule was not urgent. It was in February 2017 when the government approved the Royal Decree that included the regulation of the law, due to the increase in inflation observed in the previous months, which could jeopardize, according to the government, the economic growth that Spain had experienced in recent years, based on competitiveness in foreign markets.

== Social response ==
The UGT union criticized the law because, in its opinion, it could affect collective bargaining and reduce the purchasing power of workers in companies working for the public sector. According to UGT, the main problem of Spanish competitiveness is not in inflation, but in the lack of innovation, and therefore the deindexation law is not the best way to promote the competitiveness of Spanish companies. For its part, the Economic and Social Council (Spain) warned that the law could discourage the participation of companies in long-term projects such as those related to public works.

== See also ==
- Indexation
