= Organización de Trabajadoras Sexuales =

Spanish trade union organizing sex workers

OTRAS
- Organización de Trabajadoras Sexuales
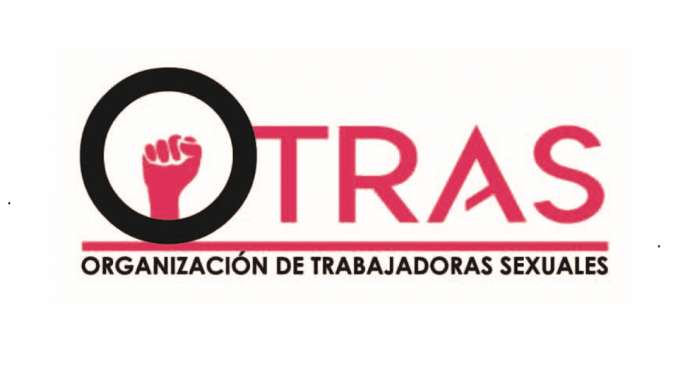
- Formation: August 4, 2018; 7 years ago
- Purpose: Advocacy for sex-positive feminism & sex workers' rights
- Secretary General: Linda Porn

The Organización de Trabajadoras Sexuales (OTRAS) is a Spanish trade union representing sex workers.

== History ==
OTRAS was formed in August 2018 and registered with Spain's Labour Ministry as a trade union.

However, a number of anti-sex work activists opposed the formation of the union and instigated a campaign on social media against them using the hashtag #SoyAbolicionista (“I’m an Abolitionist”). Those groups then brought a court action against OTRAS, resulting on OTRAS's statutes being annulled on the grounds that there can be no employment contract for prostitutes and therefore they were not "workers" in terms of employment law, but the court did not dissolve the union. In February 2019, the Superior Court of Justice of Madrid ruled that a prostitute working in a club in Barcelona had a valid employment relationship with the club owners. In June 2021, the Spanish Supreme Court overturned the ruling against OTRAS, thus confirming the union's registration as legal.

Sabrina Sánchez formerly served as OTRAS' communications secretary until 2021.

== See also ==
- Prostitution in Spain
