= Red Mass =

Liturgy in the Catholic Church for members of the legal profession

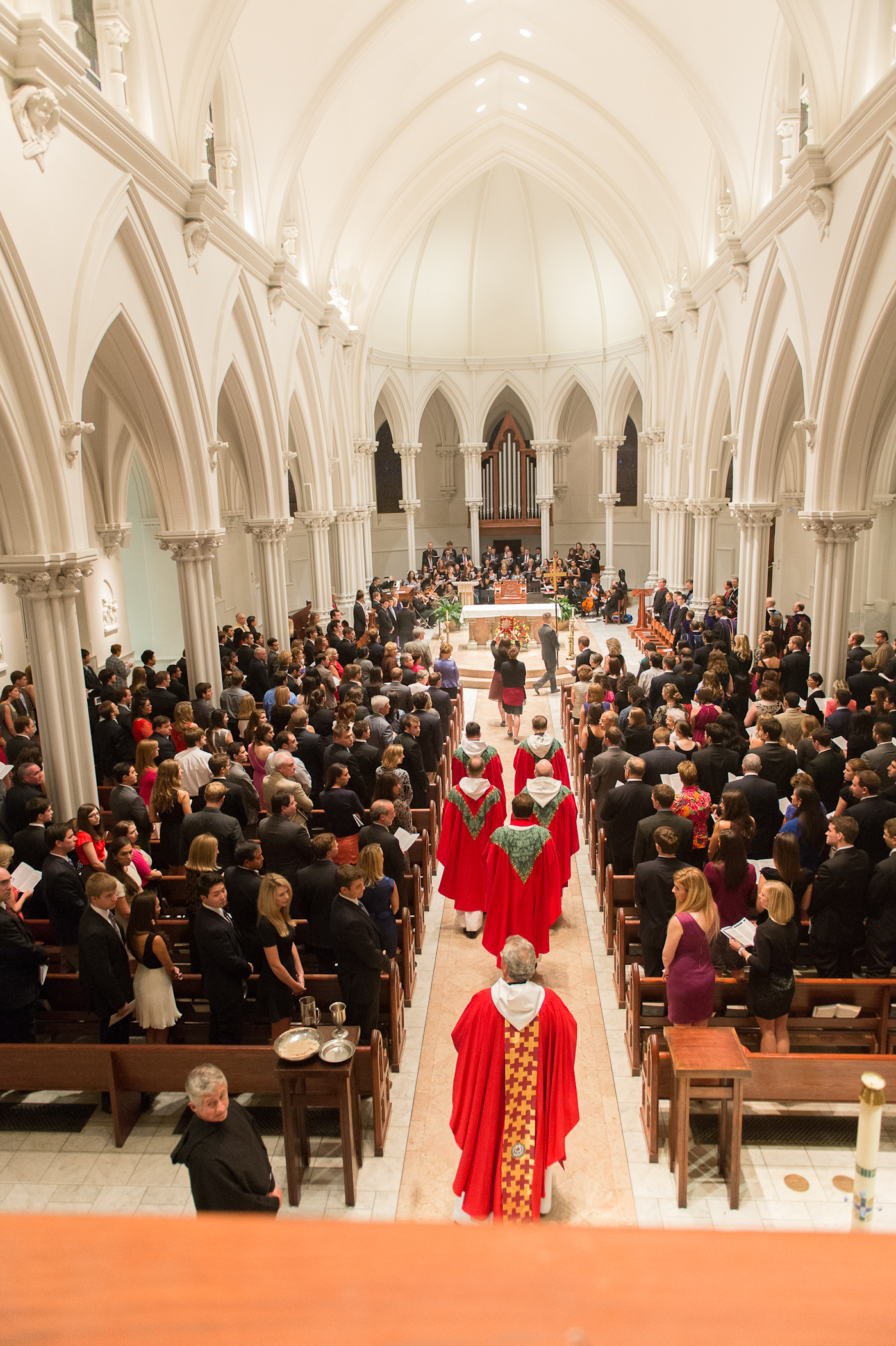
- Red Mass at the Villanova School of Law (2012)
- Type: Mass
- Orientation: Catholic Church
- Scripture: Acts 2:1–4

A Red Mass is a Catholic Mass annually offered towards all members of the legal profession, regardless of religious affiliation: judges, lawyers, law school professors, law students, and government officials, marking the opening of the judicial year. The religious service requests guidance from the Holy Spirit for all who seek justice, and offers the legal community an opportunity to reflect on the power and responsibility of all in the legal profession.

Originating in Europe during the High Middle Ages, the Red Mass derives from the red vestments traditionally worn in symbolism of the tongues of fire (the Holy Spirit) that descended on the Apostles at Pentecost Sunday (Acts 2:1–4). Its name also exemplifies the scarlet robes worn by royal judges that attended the Mass centuries ago.

In many countries with a Protestant tradition, such as England and Wales and Australia, a similar church service is held to mark the start of the legal year, with judges customarily wearing their ceremonial regalia.

== History ==
The first recorded Red Mass was celebrated in the Cathedral of Paris in 1245. In certain localities of France, the Red Mass was celebrated in honor of Saint Ives, the Patron Saint of Lawyers. From there, it spread to most European countries. The tradition began in England around 1310, during the reign of Edward II. It was attended at the opening of each term of Court by all members of the Bench and Bar. Today the Red Mass is celebrated annually at Westminster Cathedral.

In the United States, the first Red Mass was held in 1877 at Saints Peter and Paul Church Detroit, Michigan, by Detroit College, as the University of Detroit Mercy was known at the time. UDM School of Law resumed the tradition beginning in 1912 and continues to hold it annually. In New York City, a Red Mass was first held in 1928 at the Church of St. Andrew, near the courthouses of Foley Square, celebrated by Cardinal Patrick Joseph Hayes, who strongly advocated and buttressed the legal community's part in evangelization.

In Canada, the Red Mass has been celebrated in Toronto since the mid-1920's. It has been organized by The Thomas More Lawyers' Guild of Toronto on an annual basis since 1931. It was re-instituted in Sydney, Australia in 1931.

== Red Mass today ==
The main difference between the Red Mass and a traditional Mass is that the focus of prayer and blessings concentrate on the leadership roles of those present. The gifts of the Holy Spirit: wisdom, understanding, counsel and fortitude, are customarily invoked upon those in attendance.

=== Ireland ===
In Ireland, the Votive Mass of the Holy Spirit (the Red Mass) is held annually on the first Monday of October, which is the first day of the Michaelmas Law Term. The ceremony is held at St. Michan's Roman Catholic church, which is the parish church of the Four Courts. It is attended by the Irish judiciary, barristers and solicitors, as well as representatives of the diplomatic corps, Gardaí, the Northern Irish, English and Scottish judiciary. The judiciary do not wear their judicial robes, although formal morning dress is worn. Journalist Dearbhail McDonald has described it as "a grave, necessary reminder of the awesome powers and responsibilities of all those who dispense justice, including judges, lawyers, government and gardaí." A parallel ceremony is held at St. Michan's Church of Ireland (Anglican Protestant).

=== Philippines ===
In the Philippines, De La Salle University, Xavier University – Ateneo de Cagayan, and other Jesuit schools, and Holy Angel University annually celebrate the Red Mass, which they call "Mass of the Holy Spirit." The University of Santo Tomas, the Colegio de San Juan de Letran (Dominicans), and the San Beda University (Benedictines) also celebrate the Red Mass, known as Misa de Apertura, that is followed by the Discurso de Apertura to formally open the academic year.

=== Scotland ===
In Scotland, a Red Mass is held annually each autumn in St. Mary's Roman Catholic Cathedral in Edinburgh to mark the beginning of the Scottish Judicial year. It is attended by Roman Catholic Senators of the College of Justice, sheriffs, advocates, solicitors and law students all dressed in their robes of office. The robes of the Senators are red faced with white.

=== United States ===
Diocese of Austin 2009 Red Mass Announcement

One of the better-known Red Masses is the one celebrated each fall at the Cathedral of St. Matthew the Apostle in Washington, D.C., on the Sunday before the first Monday in October (the Supreme Court convenes on the first Monday in October). It is sponsored by the John Carroll Society and attended by some Supreme Court justices, members of Congress, the diplomatic corps, the Cabinet and other government departments and sometimes the President of the United States. Each year, at the Brunch following the Red Mass, the Society confers its Pro Bono Legal Service Awards to thank lawyers and law firms that have provided outstanding service.

Justice Ruth Bader Ginsburg, who was Jewish, used to attend the Red Mass with her Christian colleagues earlier in her tenure on the Court, but later stopped attending due to her objection to the use of images of aborted fetuses during a homily opposing abortion.

The first Red Mass in the United States was celebrated at Saints Peter and Paul Church (Detroit) in 1877, under the auspices of what is now the University of Detroit Mercy. The tradition was resumed in 1912, and has been held annually since. This Red Mass is the oldest continuously held in the United States. The better-known Red Mass in New York was first celebrated in 1928. The first Red Mass in Boston was celebrated on October 4, 1941 at Immaculate Conception Church under the auspices of Boston College Law School. A Red Mass is also celebrated at St. Joseph's Cathedral in the Diocese of Manchester, New Hampshire, at the University of San Diego, and at the Basilica of the Assumption in the Archdiocese of Baltimore. A Red Mass was first observed in Washington, D.C., in 1939 at the National Shrine of the Immaculate Conception. It continued as an annual event there under the auspices of the law school of the Catholic University of America. It was held in January to coincide with the opening of Congress. In 1953 it was moved to St. Matthew's Cathedral, but continued to be held at the beginning of the year until 1977. The University of Notre Dame ordinarily celebrates a Red Mass in the Basilica of the Sacred Heart each fall semester, at which the bishop of Fort Wayne-South Bend typically presides.

=== Canada ===
==== Quebec ====
The first Red Mass in Montreal was celebrated at Notre-Dame Basilica in September 1944 to mark the start of the judicial year and the opening of the courts. Until 1967, lawyers and judges in robes would make their way to Notre-Dame Basilica, just as they had done in the past in Paris and London.

In 1967, amid the excitement surrounding the Universal Exposition, the Montreal Bar Council wished to highlight the ecumenical nature of such a celebration. The Catholic and Protestant archbishops and a rabbi from Montreal led a joint interfaith prayer in the lobby of Montreal City Hall. This celebration was repeated in 1968 and 1969.

Beginning in 1970, the Red Mass returned to its original format at Notre-Dame Basilica, celebrated by the Archbishop of Montreal, accompanied by members of the ecclesiastical tribunal of the Diocese of Montreal, which lends a sense of solemnity to this tradition.

Starting in 1997, the organization was taken over by a committee independent of the Montreal Bar, whose mission was to ensure its continuity.

Since 2023, the Société Saint-Yves de Montréal has been responsible for organizing the Red Mass in Montreal, which continues to be celebrated at Notre-Dame Basilica every year on the first Thursday after Labor Day, marking the start of the judicial year.

In Quebec City, the first Red Mass was celebrated on September 10, 1896, at the Seminary Chapel at the initiative of the then Bâtonnier, François-Xavier Lemieux, in the presence of Lord Russell of Killowen, then Lord Chief Justice of England and Wales and the first Catholic to hold that office in centuries. This tradition continued for many years thereafter in the Jesuit chapel on Rue d’Auteuil.

==== Ontario ====
The Red Mass was first held in Toronto in 1925. Its sponsorship was assumed by the Guild of Our Lady of Good Counsel in 1931 and by The Thomas More Lawyers’ Guild of Toronto since 1968. Today, the Red Mass is celebrated at St. Michael’s Cathedral in Toronto and is followed by a reception. This event is even recognized by the Law Society of Ontario for continuing legal education credits.

In Ottawa, the Red Mass marks the opening of the fall court session and is organized by the Saint Thomas More Lawyers’ Guild of Ottawa at the cathedral. The Mass is followed by a reception.

In 2019, a group of lawyers, later to become the Red Mass Society of Windsor, partnered with Assumption University to revive the Red Mass tradition in Windsor. On October 13, 2022, a Red Mass was celebrated with the Most Reverend Ronald Peter Fabbro, CSB, Bishop of London and Chancellor of Assumption University presiding. Following the Red Mass, the Chief Justice Bridget McCormack of the Michigan Supreme Court received the inaugural St. Thomas More Gold Medal. Established in 2022, the St. Thomas More Gold Medal is awarded at the annual Red Mass. It is presented to a legal professional who has rendered outstanding service to their profession over the course of several years. The recipient of the award is chosen by the Red Mass Society of Windsor and presented by the Principal of Assumption University.

==== Alberta ====
The inaugural Mass was celebrated in Edmonton in 1961 by Bishop Anthony Jordan, O.M.I., D.D.

The Red Mass is organized annually by St. Thomas More Lawyers' Guild of Northern Alberta. It is followed by a reception and features various speakers.

=== Australia ===
The St Thomas More Society for Catholic lawyers, founded in Sydney in 1945, holds a Red Mass annually.

== See also ==
- Blue Mass
- Opening of the Judicial Year
