= Mercè Caso =

Spanish judge (born 1964)

President of the High Court of Justice of Catalonia
- Incumbent
- Assumed office 7 April 2025
- Preceded by: Jesús María Barrientos Pacho

Personal details
- Born: 1964 (age 61–62) Barcelona, Catalonia, Spain
- Education: University of Barcelona

Mercè Caso i Señal (born 1964) is a Spanish judge. She has been president of the High Court of Justice of Catalonia since 2025.

== Career ==
Caso was born in 1964 in Barcelona, Catalonia, Spain. She graduated in law from the University of Barcelona and began her judicial career in 1989.

Her first posting was at the Court of First Instance and Preliminary Investigations No. 1 in Vilafranca del Penedès, and three years later she was promoted to judge at the Court of First Instance and Preliminary Investigations in Mataró, subsequently serving in the criminal and family courts of Barcelona.

In 2007, Caso began working as a legal adviser to the General Council of the Judiciary and as a lecturer at the Judicial School. She returned to the courts in Barcelona in 2012. Between 2013 and 2021, she served as senior judge in Barcelona and subsequently as a judge at the Provincial Court of Barcelona, specialising in family law. Following the provisional imprisonment order for the pro-independence leaders in 2017, Caso stated in 2019 that she believed there were other alternatives and questioned the commission of a crime of rebellion by the authors of the Catalan declaration of independence. She is member of the Judges for Democracy.

On 26 February 2025 the General Council of the Judiciary named Caso the new president of the High Court of Justice of Catalonia, to succeed Jesús María Barrientos Pacho whose term of office had already expired three years ago but for whom no successor had been appointed. Following her appointment, she expressed her intention to involve the Court in institutional events in Catalonia in order to restore the image of this body as being close to the people, which had been damaged during the years of the independence movement. Caso was sworn in on 7 April 2025. In her inaugural speech, she called for respect for judicial decisions and the rule of law, as well as for the promotion of Catalan language within the judiciary.
