= High Court of Justice of Canarias =

Highest judicial power of Canary Islands (Spain)

- Tribunal Superior de Justicia de Canarias
- Established: 1989
- Location: Vegueta, Las Palmas and Santa Cruz de Tenerife
- Composition method: Partisan election
- Authorised by: Ley Orgánica del Poder Judicial
- Appeals to: Supreme Court; National Court (In some administrative law cases)
- Website: www.poderjudicial.es

President of the High Court of Justice of Canarias
- Currently: Juan Luis Lorenzo Bragado
- Since: 11 May 2021

The High Court of Justice of the Canary Islands (in Spanish: Tribunal Superior de Justicia de Canarias) is the highest organ of the judicial power in the autonomous community of Canary Islands (Spain). It has its seat in Las Palmas de Gran Canaria.

== History ==
Its most direct antecedent were the former Territorial Courts born in 1812. The current High Court of Justice of the Canary Islands was created in 1985 from Article 26 of the Organic Law of the Judiciary, being constituted on May 23, 1989.

== Jurisdictions ==
The High Court of Justice of the Canary Islands is the jurisdictional body in which the judicial organization in the autonomous community culminates, without prejudice to the competence reserved to the Supreme Court.

== Organization ==
The High Court of the Canary Islands is divided into four organs:

- The Governing Chamber
- The Civil and Criminal Chamber
- The Chamber for Contentious-Administrative Matters
- The Social Chamber

== Seat ==
The TSJC has its seat in the heart of Vegueta, the oldest district of Las Palmas de Gran Canaria. Also in Santa Cruz de Tenerife is one of the administrative litigation chambers and one of the social chambers.

== Presidency ==
The current president of the Superior Court of Justice of the Canary Islands is Juan Luis Lorenzo Bragado.

== See also ==
- Separation of Powers
- High courts of justice (Spain)
- Statute of Autonomy of Canarias of 1982
