= High Court of Justice of Cantabria =

- Tribunal Superior de Justicia de Cantabria
- Judiciary of Spain

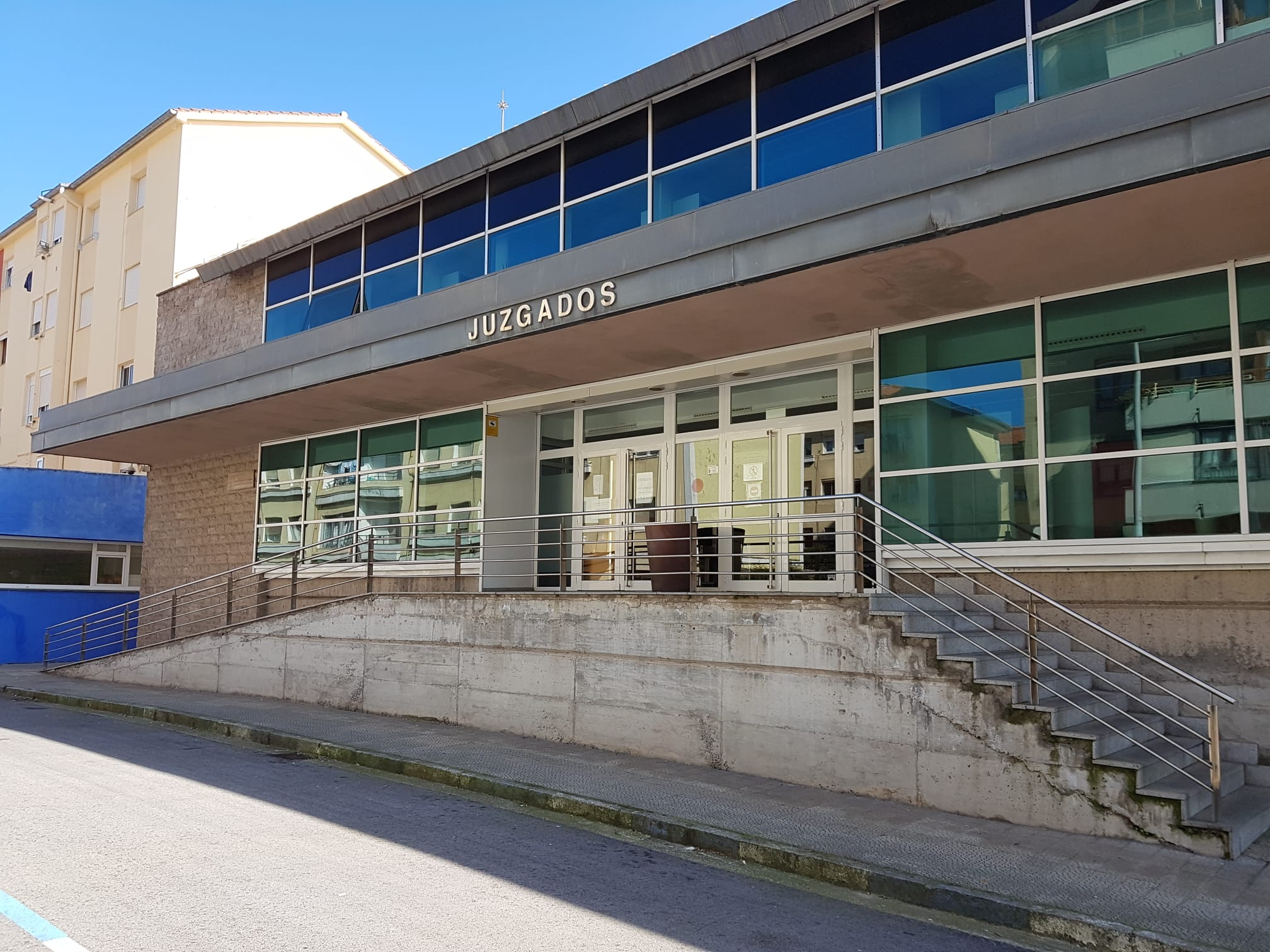
- Established: May 23, 1989
- Jurisdiction: Cantabria
- Location: Santander
- Composition method: Appointed by the Monarch on selection by the General Council of the Judiciary.
- Authorised by: Spanish Constitution
- Appeals to: Supreme Court; National Court (In some administrative law cases)
- Website: TSJ Cantabria

President
- Currently: José Arsuaga Cortázar
- Since: 3 March 2026

The High Court of Justice of Cantabria (TSJC) is the highest court of the Spanish judiciary in Cantabria, Spain. Established pursuant to Title VIII of the Spanish Constitution, it has original jurisdiction over cases against high-ranking officials of the autonomous community and appellate jurisdiction over all cases. The TSJC decisions may be appealed to the Supreme Court. It also has entrusted the resolution of conflicts of competence between courts in Cantabria. The Court has the power of judicial review over norms with lower rank than the law of the regional administrations.

As set in the Judiciary Organic Act of 1985, the Court consists of the President of the High Court of Justice, the Chairpersons of the Chambers and an undetermined number of Magistrates. The president has the rank of Magistrate of the Supreme Court and chairs over the Civil and Criminal Law Chamber. The president is nominated by the General Council of the Judiciary for a tenure of five years.

As well as the Supreme Court, each Magistrate of the High Court is nominated by the General Council of the Judiciary and appointed by the Monarch for a lifetime tenure up to the age of 70, when they must retire, although they can request a 2 years extension.

== History ==
Its most direct antecedent were the old Audiencias Territoriales (Territorial Courts) born in 1812. This territorial courts only had two rooms, one for civil matters and other for criminals. The present High Court of Justice of Cantabria was created in 1985 from article 26 of the Organic Law of the Judicial Power, being constituted on 23 May 1989.

== Composition ==
The High Court of Justice is composed by three Chambers, one dedicated to the civil and criminal cases, other for the cases against the Public Administrations and other for Labour cases. The number of justices is 11 distributed in the following way:

- Chamber for Civil and Criminal Law. Three magistrates.
- Chamber for Administrative Law. Four magistrates.
- Chamber for Labour Law. Four magistrates.

It does exist a fourth chamber, although is not a jurisdictional one. It is the so-called Governing Chamber. This Chamber is formed by 8 justices, four democratically elected by the judges and the other four are members by right: the three presidents of the TSJC' Chambers and the President of the Provincial Court of Cantabria. Its powers are related to the domestic governance of the Court.

== Headquarters ==
The headquarters of the Court is in the Judicial Complex of Las Salesas, in Santander, the capital of Cantabria.

== List of presidents ==
- Claudio Movilla Álvarez (1989–1997)
- Francisco Javier Sánchez Pego (1997–2004)
- César Tolosa Tribiño (2004–2015)
- José Luis López del Moral (2015–2026)
- José Arsuaga Cortázar (2026–present)

== See also ==
- Judiciary of Spain
- Superior Court of Justice of Spain
- Upper Court of Justice of Castile and Leon
