= Sabrina Sánchez =

Mexican human rights activist (born 1981)

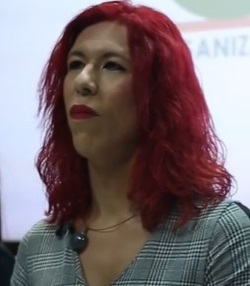
- Sánchez speaking in 2017
- Born: 1981 (age 44–45); Mexico City, Mexico
- Education: Universidad Autónoma Metropolitana
- Occupations: Human rights activist Sex worker
- Organization: Organización de Trabajadoras Sexuales
- Known for: Advocacy for transgender sex workers and migrants working in Spain

Sabrina Michelle Rivera Sánchez (born 1981), also known by the online pseudonym Shirley McLaren, is a Mexican human rights activist and sex worker, based in Spain. An advocate for the rights of transgender sex workers and migrants, she is the spokesperson for the International Committee on the Rights of Sex Workers in Europe, and was previously the communications secretary of the Organización de Trabajadoras Sexuales, a Spanish trade union representing sex workers.

== Early life and education ==
Sánchez was born in 1981, into a middle-class family living in Mexico City. She was educated at a bilingual school, before studying journalism at the Universidad Autónoma Metropolitana. During her time at university, Sánchez came out as a trans woman and a lesbian, and transitioned to living openly as a woman between the ages of 21 and 22.

After graduating, Sánchez began working in a newsroom, though experienced discrimination because of her gender. Inspired by the progressive government of José Luis Rodríguez Zapatero, the then-Prime Minister of Spain, she decided to migrate to Spain, moving to Catalonia.

== Activism ==
Sánchez first lived with her girlfriend, a sex worker, in Girona, before later moving to Barcelona. Due to her degree not being recognised in Spain, as well as her not being able to speak Catalan, Sánchez began working as a sex worker. Sánchez has criticised the Swedish model of sex work, which she stated led to an increase in attacks on sex workers, as well as the loss of clients and income; she is supportive of the New Zealand model, which grants sex workers the same employment rights as other workers. She has described sex work as an "option", but states there are "limited options" available to transgender women due to capitalism and has said that feminist opposition to the legalisation of sex work comes from "white, European, heterosexual and cisgender" feminists and a lack of intersectionality in their approach to feminism.

Sánchez became a member of the Carolines programme, launched by City Council of Barecelona to support transgender sex workers access support and local services. She also joined the Association of Sex Workers (Spanish: Asociación de Profesionales del Sexo, Aprosex), the precursor organisation to the Organización de Trabajadoras Sexuales (OTRAS), going on to become the association's secretary. During her time with Aprosex, Sánchez took part in events including Take Back the Night in Sants, and called for more training to be provided to medical staff to help them better treat transgender patients.

Sánchez became known online as a transfeminist activist and advocate for the rights of transgender people and migrants living in Spain, writing under the pseudonym Shirley McLaren. She said "patriarchy makes life difficult for transgender women and cisgender women" and has criticised gender-critical feminist movements and nationalist movements like HazteOir. Sánchez also commented on the experiences of transgender people in her native Mexico, calling on the Mexican government to promote the inclusion of transgender people into leadership positions, which she believed would reduce police brutality and the low life expectancy of transgender people in Mexico, which stood at 35 in 2020. Following reports that nine out of ten sex workers in Spain were migrants, Sánchez became the spokesperson for the International Committee on the Rights of Sex Workers in Europe, and joined the anti-racist collective t.i.c.t.a.c. (Spanish: Taller de Intervenciones Críticas Transfeministas Antirracistas Combativas, lit. 'Workshop of Critical Transfeminist Antiracist Combative Interventions'). While an advocate for the legalisation of sex work, Sánchez identified that some migrants did not become sex workers by choice, citing unique barriers facing them, including a lack of access to public healthcare, employment opportunities and housing.

In 2018, Aprosex was given permission to unionise by the Ministry of Labour; while the Spanish government initially annulled the decision, the annulment was later reversed by the courts. Sánchez became the communications secretary of OTRAS, continuing in the role until 2021. She frequently appeared in the Catalan and Spanish media to defend the decision to allow sex workers to form a union, and denied allegations that the union had ties to brothel owners and pimps, stating it was established to solely support the rights of sex workers themselves.
