= Teresa Peramato Martín =

Spanish prosecutor

The Most Excellent Teresa Peramato Martín
- Peramato in 2026

Prosecutor General of the State
- Incumbent
- Assumed office 10 December 2025
- Preceded by: Álvaro García Ortiz

Personal details
- Born: 12 November 1962 (age 63) Salamanca, Spain
- Education: University of Salamanca

Teresa Peramato Martín (Salamanca, 12 November 1962) is a Spanish prosecutor who serves as Prosecutor General of the State since 2025. With a long career in the field of gender-related violence, she is considered one of the leading experts in the fight against violence against women in Spain.

== Biography ==
Born in Salamanca in 1962, Peramato graduated in law by the University of Salamanca and joined the prosecutor career in 1989. She has held positions in the prosecutor's offices of the provincial courts of Tenerife and Valladolid, and in the prosecutor's offices of the High Courts of Justice of Catalonia and Madrid. She has served as chief prosecutor of the Violence against Women Section of the Prosecutor's Office of the High Court of Justice of Madrid and, later, as prosecutor in the Violence against Women Prosecutor Office of the Prosecutor General's Office, as well as a prosecutor in the Constitutional Court.

She was a member of the Expert Group of the State Observatory on Violence against Women. She has also served as president of the Progressive Union of Prosecutors, during which time she advocated for increased autonomy for the Public Prosecutor's Office.

In May 2021 she was appointed chief prosecutor of the Violence against Women Prosecutor Office of the Prosecutor General's Office and, four years later, chief prosecutor of the Criminal Section of the Prosecutor's Office to the Supreme Court.

On 25 November 2025, the Council of Ministers nominated her as Prosecutor General of the State following the resignation of Álvaro García Ortiz. The following day, the General Council of the Judiciary unanimously supported her appointment. On December 4 of that year, she testified before the Congress of Deputies' Justice Committee, where she recognized the work of her predecessors, especially mentioning García Ortiz, and set herself the goal of "healing the deep wound" generated by his criminal case. Her appointment was made official on 10 December 2025.

== Honours and awards ==
=== Honours ===
- Cross of the Order of Police Merit, with White Decoration (2010).
- Cross of the Order of Merit of the Civil Guard (2016).

=== Awards ===
- Alicia Salcedo Equality Award from the Oviedo Bar Association (2018).
- Beatriz Galindo Equality Award from the Salamanca Bar Association (2021).
- Ministry of Equality's Award to commemorate the International Day for the Elimination of Violence against Women (2021).
