= High Court of Justice of Catalonia =

Highest judicial power of Catalonia (Spain)

- Tribunal Superior de Justícia de Catalunya
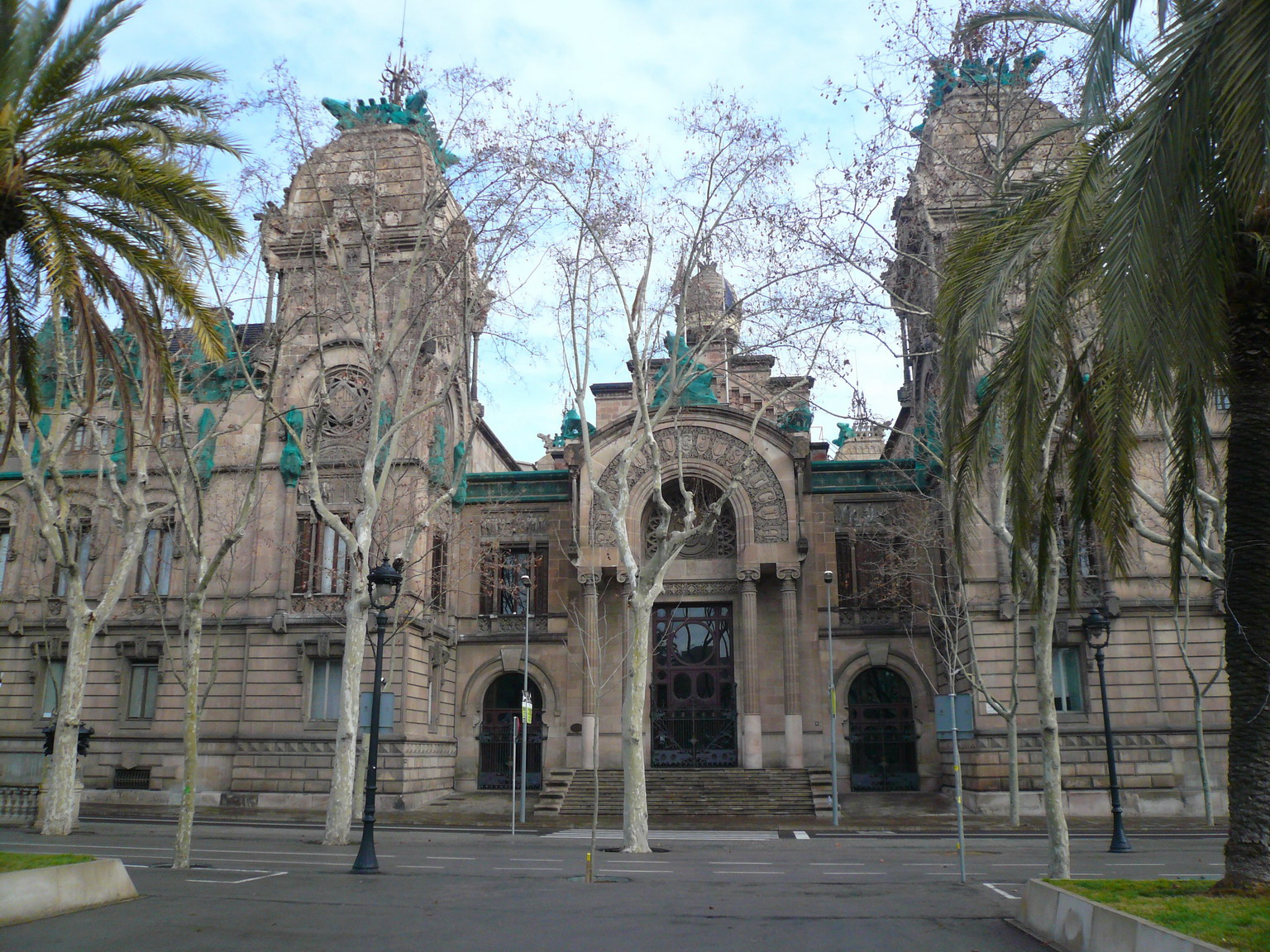
- Palau de Justícia, seat of the TSJC
- Established: 1989
- Jurisdiction: Catalonia
- Location: Passeig de Lluís Companys, Barcelona
- Composition method: Partisan election
- Authorised by: Ley Orgánica del Poder Judicial
- Appeals to: Supreme Court; National Court (In some administrative law cases)
- Website: www.poderjudicial.es

President of the High Court of Justice of Catalonia
- Currently: Mercè Caso
- Since: 7 April 2025

The High Court of Justice of Catalonia (Catalan: Tribunal Superior de Justícia de Catalunya, TSJC) is the highest body and last judicial instance of the Spanish judiciary in Catalonia. Unlike the Parliament of Catalonia (legislative branch) or the Executive Council of Catalonia (executive branch), the TSJC is not a part of the Generalitat of Catalonia, the autonomous system of self-government of the community, although the Catalan government has some powers over it, especially in material resources.

The TSJC regulates the functions of the judges and looks over the different provincial courts. The TSJC is the final appellate court in Catalan territory, notwithstanding the right of a citizen to appeal to the Spanish Supreme Court and/or the European Court of Justice.

The TSJC was created on 23 May 1989 with the Organic Law of Judicial Authority (Spanish: Ley Orgánica del Poder Judicial), as part of the process of devolution to Catalonia from the Spanish government, started in 1979. Its headquarters are located at the Palau de Justícia, Barcelona.

== Composition ==
=== Organization ===
The High Court of Justice of consists of three courts, although a fourth, for Minors, has been proposed.

- Civil and Penal (Sala Civil i Penal): Five magistrates, including the President of the Tribunal.
- Contentious-Administrative (Sala Contenciosa-Administrativa): Fourteen magistrates, distributed in four sections.
- Social (Sala Social): Sixteen magistrates, distributed in four sections.

=== President ===
==== Appointment process ====
Candidates need to obtain a three fifths (13) supermajority of the 21 votes of the General Council of Judicial Authority (Spanish: Consejo General del Poder Judicial).

==== Presidents ====
- José Antonio Somalo Giménez (1989–1994)
- Guillem Vidal Andreu (1994–2004)
- Maria Eugènia Alegret i Burgués (2004–2010)
- Miguel Ángel Gimeno Jubero (2010 - January 2016)
- Jesús María Barrientos Pacho (January 2016 – April 2025)
- Mercè Caso (April 2025 – present)

== See also ==
- High Court of Justice of Cantabria
- Separation of Powers
- Statute of Autonomy of Catalonia of 1979
- Statute of Autonomy of Catalonia of 2006
- Tribunal de Cassació
