= Economic and Social Council (Spain) =

- Consejo Económico y Social
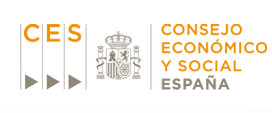
- Economic and Social Council logo

Advisory body overview
- Formed: June 18, 1991; 35 years ago
- Jurisdiction: Spanish Government
- Headquarters: Huertas Street, 73, Madrid
- Annual budget: € 8 million, 2022
- Advisory body executive: Marcos Peña, President
- Parent department: Ministry of Labour

The Economic and Social Council (CES) of Spain is one of the two advisory bodies that assist the Government of Spain in its duties. It is the body responsible for advising the Government in socioeconomic and work matters.

The CES is composed by 61 counsellors (including its President) divided in 3 groups of 20. The first group is composed by union representatives, the second group is composed by enterprises representatives and the last group is composed by representatives of the agrarian sector, maritime and fishing sector, consumers, social economy sector and 6 experts in the competences of the Council.

The counsellors are nominated by the different organizations of the sectors that participate in the Council with the exception of the 6 experts, which are nominated by the Minister of Labour and Minister of Economy. All of them are appointed by the Government.

The members of the Council will cease in the cases of expiration of the term of their mandate, at the proposal of the organizations that promoted the appointment, by resignation, due to death, for the evident breach of his duties and for having been convicted of an intentional crime. The President, apart from the mentioned causes, can cease if a joint decision between the ministers of Labour and Economy is made to fire him.

== Functions ==
The main function of the Council is to give opinions about matters of its competence. Some opinions are legally obligated to be made in cases of draft bills about socio economic and labour issues, about the internal organization of the Council or about the decision to fire the President or Secretary General of the Council. The rest of the reports and studies made by the Council require to be asked by the Government.

== Main bodies ==
=== President ===
The President holds the representation of the Council and directs the performance thereof. Also convene the sessions of the Plenum and the Permanent Commission, chairs and moderates the development of the debates, sets the agenda for the sessions of the Plenum and the Permanent Commission, taking into account the requests made by its members in the form that it be established in its internal organization and authorize the minutes, order the publication of the agreements and arrange for compliance with them.

=== Plenum ===
The Plenum of the Council is composed of all its members, under the direction of the President and assisted by the Secretary General.

The Plenum session holds ordinary sessions at least once a month, without prejudice to the possibility of holding extraordinary sessions in the terms determined by the Plenum itself. For the valid constitution of the Plenary will be necessary the presence of, at least, thirty one of its members, plus the President and the Secretary General or those who legally replace them. On second call, the attendance of twenty members plus the resident and the Secretary General or those who legally substitute them will suffice.

The Plenary will adopt the agreements by absolute majority of the attendees, in case of draw, it will be the President who has the last word. The agreements are not binding.

=== Secretary General ===
The Secretary General exercises the administrative and technical direction of the different services of the Council and ensures that their bodies act in accordance with the principles of economy, speed and efficiency; attends, with voice but without vote, to the sessions of the Plenum and of the Permanent Commission of the Council; make the minutes of the sessions, authorize them with their signature and the approval of the President and give the corresponding course to the agreements that are adopted.

It also keeps the documentation of the Council; issues certifications of the minutes, agreements, opinions, private votes and other documents entrusted to its custody with the approval of the President and assumes the leadership of the staff at the service of the Council.

== See also ==
- Council of State of Spain
- United Nations Economic and Social Council
