= High Court of Justice of Castile and León =

Superior and appellate court in Castile and León, based in Burgos

- Tribunal Superior de Justicia de Castilla y León
- Judiciary of Spain
- Established: 1989
- Jurisdiction: Castille and León
- Location: Burgos
- Composition method: Civil and Criminal Chamber; Administrative Chamber; Employment (Social) Chamber
- Authorised by: Superior Court of Justice
- Appeals to: Supreme Court of Spain
- Appeals from: Audiencias Provinciales (civil and criminal cases); Juzgados de lo Contencioso-Administrativo (administrative law cases); Juzgados de lo Social (labour law cases).
- Judge term length: indefinite
- Website: poderjudicial.es/cgpj/es/Poder-Judicial/Tribunales-Superiores-de-Justicia/TSJ-Castilla-y-Leon/

Presidente
- Currently: José Luis Concepción Rodríguez

The High Court of Justice of Castile and León (Spanish: Tribunal Superior de Justicia de Castilla y León), is the superior and appellate court of the Judiciary of Spain in the territory of the autonomous community of Castile and León, notwithstanding its original jurisdiction in some cases, and the jurisdiction of the Supreme court. Located in Burgos, the court is divided into the Civil, Criminal, Administrative (Spanish: Contencioso-Administrativo) and Labour (Social) chambers. The High Court is also tasked with the resolution of jurisdictional conflicts between the courts in Castile and León.

The court was established by article 26 of the Organic Law of the Judiciary of 1985 (Spanish: Ley Orgánica del Poder Judicial de 1985).

The President of this court is appointed by the General Council of the Judiciary for a five year term. The president of the High Court of Justice of Castile and León is José Luis Concepción Rodríguez.

== Courthouse ==
In July 1871 an agreement was reached to erect a building to be the seat of the then-Territorial Court (Spanish: Audiencia Territorial). It was designed by Castile and León architect David Ruiz Jareño. Construction did not start until 1878, and after some budget problems the building was completed on January 22, 1887.

During the renovation from 2007 to 2011 the courthouse was temporarily moved to the court buildings in the civic centre of San Juan. The renovations were completed In 2012.

It shares the building with the Provincial Court (Spanish: Audiencia Provincial) of Burgos and the Office of the Superior Prosecutor for Castile and León.
