= Court of Auditors (Spain) =

Supreme governmental accounting body of Spain

- Tribunal de Cuentas
- Coat of arms of Spain

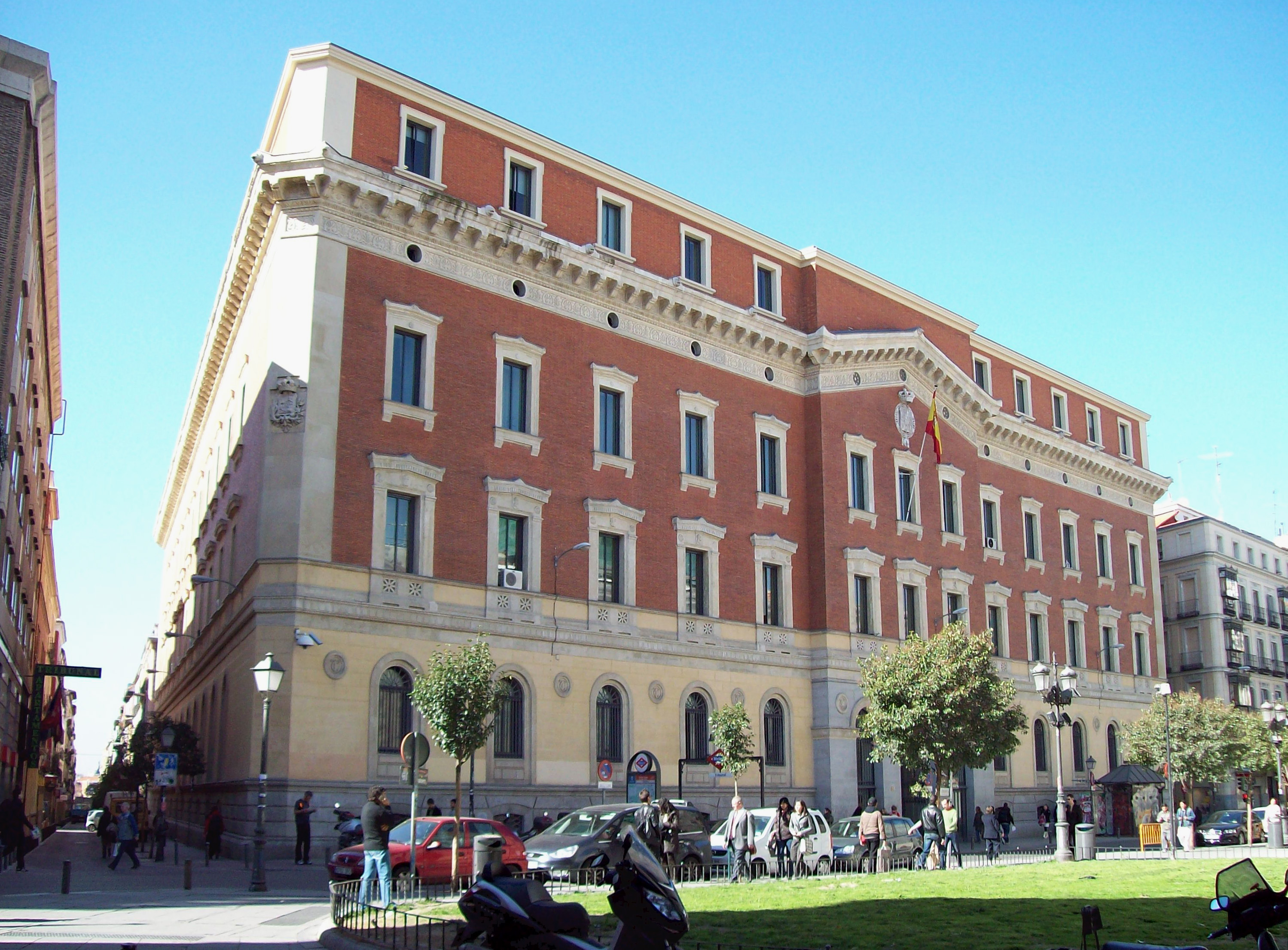
- Headquarters of the Court of Accounts, in Madrid.

Agency overview
- Formed: July 2, 1437; 589 years ago Current name: November 10, 1828
- Jurisdiction: All the administrations of Spain
- Headquarters: Fuencarral Street, 81, Madrid
- Employees: 791 (31 December 2025)
- Annual budget: € 74.97 million (2022)
- Agency executive: Enriqueta Chicano Jávega, President
- Parent department: Cortes Generales
- Website: tcu.es

The Court of Auditors (Spanish: Tribunal de Cuentas) is the supreme governmental accounting body of Spain responsible of the comptrolling of the public accounts and the auditing of the accountancy of the political parties, in accordance with the Constitution and its Organic Act.

The Court of Auditors is composed of the President and 12 counsellors. The Counsellors are appointed by the Cortes Generales, six of them by the Congress and the other six by the Senate. To be appointed Counsellor of the Court it is needed to be a person with knowledge in audit, judge, prosecutor, university teacher or a public servant in an office that requires superior studies, lawyer, economist or trade professor, all of them with recognized experience and with fifteen years of professional activity. The Court Account Counselors are independent and irremovable. Their term is 9 years.

== History ==
The very first origins of the Court go back to the Reign of John II of Castile. Álvaro de Luna, Constable of Castile, when the King was advised to approve a royal order to simplify tax collection due to the difficulties in the collection of taxes and in the ordering of the accounts. This royal order was approved on July 2, 1437, and it regulated the Senior Accountants, a group of civil servants in charge of resolving economic conflicts and reclaiming the money that was not paid in time.

During the reign of Isabella and Ferdinand, new ordinances were granted on January 9, 1478, to put an end to the backlog of outstanding accounts since 1454, in the Kingdom of Castile. The Accountancy was given the exclusive and absolute authority to claim, censor and reject all the accounts of public officials that handle flows and effects. The Senior Accountants were given the responsibility of reviewing them, those taken and completed, as well as determining and judging the scope of accounts. They are also authorized to proceed against any person or Council, and allow them to act on behalf of the Kings.

In the last years of the reign of King Charles I, on July 10, 1554, new royal orders were granted in Valladolid to the Senior Accountants. They increased the number of accountants and the amount of the accommodation right (it was a duty of the citizens of lend a room to the King's servants during their stay in town). It was also the first time that, in a judicial process of accounts, when accounts were considered extraordinary, or with some amendment, the norms included the obligation of the people who have been in charge of the accounts to take an oath on the veracity of confusing data.

In the reign of Philip II, the Senior Accountants werre helped by lawyers that advised them and the Treasury Council was created. In 1593, a new reform in the accounting system meant that the King's Council lose its powers in accounting and these were given to the Council of the Treasury, and incompatibilities were created for the Senior Accountants, not hallowing them to have another job at the same time.

In 1605 the Court of Auditors of the Indies was created in Mexico, Bogotá and Santa Fe to control the accounts of the Spanish territories in America.

The Constitution of 1812, passed by the Cortes of Cadiz, provided for the creation of an Accounting Office "to examine all accounts of public funds". In 1828, the ordinance establishing the Highest Court of Auditors was approved, and remained in force until 1851. In 1828, the ordinance establishing the Highest Court of Auditors was approved, and remained in force until 1851.

During the regime established in the Constitution of 1845, a series of major reforms were carried out in the financial administration of the State. The Organic Act of the Court of Auditors was approved in 1851, and this was the seed of the current institution, with responsibility for the financial control of Public Administration.

In 1870, a new Law on Organization of the Court of Auditors of the Kingdom was approved and was in force until the Supreme Court of the Treasury was established in 1924, which integrated both external and internal control functions of the public sector.

The Court of Auditors of the Republic was established in the Constitution of 1931 as the supreme audit body of the economic and management in the public sector. Its Organic Act was approved in 1934.

Rules adapting the institution to the political regime in force became established later. A Law on Organization, Functions and Procedures of the Court of Auditors of the Kingdom was approved in 1953 during the Franco regime. It was amended in 1961, when the Court of Auditors was defined as the supreme external audit body of the State, with the function of reporting to the Head of State and the courts the result of its audit activity and the recognition of a genuine judicial function.

The current Court of Auditors was established in its present form by the Constitution of 1978 as the supreme audit body of the economic and management for the public sector. It is independent of the executive power and is directly linked to the Spanish Parliament.

== Structure ==
The Court of Auditors is formed by the President, the Plenary, the Management Board, the Audit Section, the Prosecution Section, the Audit Counsellors, the Court of Auditors Prosecutor's Office and the General Secretariat. It has a staff of over 700. There is clear evidence of nepotism, and reports speak of at least 100 members of staff being family members of current or former members of the Plenum or senior post holders.

Even the Supreme Court complained in February 2013 of this politization, pointing out that the Court of Auditors had more civil servants appointed by political parties than staff who had won their jobs through civil service exams.

=== President ===
The English version of the structure of the Court is here: https://www.tcu.es/tribunal-de-cuentas/en/organizacion/

The President is the head of the Court. The President represents the court, convenes and chairs the Plenum and the Management Board, oversees the personnel of the Court and is the body in charge of recruitment and control the budget.

=== Plenum ===
The Plenum, in general, deals with the audit function and proposes the approach to conflicts affecting the competences or powers of the Court of Auditors to Parliament. It also gives resolutions against the provisions and acts of other organs of the Court in the performance of governmental or staff-related functions.

The Plenum is composed of twelve Audit Counsellors (one of whom shall be the President) and the Chief Prosecutor of the Court of Auditors. The Secretary-General acts as secretary of the Plenum, with voice but without vote, and writes the minutes, reflecting the outcome of the deliberations and resolutions adopted.

The Plenum will meet at least once c month, except in the holiday period of August, as well as the extraordinary calls made by the President with justified cause, or upon request of three members of the Plenum. The quorum to validly constitute the meetings shall be two thirds of its members and their resolutions shall be adopted by a majority of participants, except in cases where the law requires a qualified majority.

The discussions of the Plenum are confidential, must be kept secret by attendees and all those who could know them by reason of their duties.

=== Management Board ===
The management board in general, sets the working conditions of the Court, exercises disciplinary powers in cases of gross misconduct, distributes cases between Sections and appoints delegates instructors.

The management board is composed of the President of the Court of Auditors and the Presidents of the Audit and Prosecution Sections. The Secretary-General acts as Secretary of the Management Board, with the right to speak but not to vote.

=== Audit Section ===
It is the body of the Court of Auditors assigned the functions of verifying the accounts of public sector bodies, reviewing and auditing accounts subject to audit, examining audit procedures conducted in the various departments and making proposals to the Plenum regarding the results of audit procedures (report, motion or memo) taken to the Spanish Parliament.

The Audit Section is organized into seven departments: four sectoral departments, which are aligned, as far as possible, with the broad areas of the financial-economic activity in the public sector; two territorial departments, one of which audits economic and financial activity of the Autonomous Communities and Autonomous Cities and another for local authorities and a department of Political Parties.

The section consists of seven Audit Counsellors appointed by the audit departments. One of them is also the President of the Audit Section.

=== Prosecution Section ===
It is the jurisdictional body of the Court. Among its functions are preparing the Summary of Court proceedings during the relevant financial year and making an appropriate proposal to the Plenum, submitting to the Plenum the amendments to be made to the structure of the Section, as well as creating new units when the number of cases so requires and laying down the criteria on the basis of which case-allocation is decided among the Units and Counsellors of the Prosecution Section.

The Prosecution Section comprises the President and the Audit Counsellors, aware of court proceedings as first instance bodies or attached to the Courtroom or Courtrooms.

=== Court of Auditors Prosecutor's Office ===
The Court of Auditors Prosecutor's Office functionally reports to the Prosecutor General and is composed of a Chief Prosecutor (member of the Plenum of the Court), and several prosecutors. The Prosecutor of the Court of Auditors is appointed by the Government.

The Court of Auditors Prosecutors’ Office is responsible for being heard in audit procedures before final approval and issue its opinion on the General State Accounts and the other reports, memoranda, motions and memos of the Court of Auditors, being able to request the adoption of the measures that it deems appropriate in order to assign liability for the financial responsibilities that may result; take notice of all the audit procedures and court proceedings being dealt with in the Court of Auditors for the purpose of clarifying the possible financial liabilities arising from them and bringing an action for accounting liability and deducting the claims of this nature in the repayment for debtor balance proceedings and in the auditing of accounts.

=== General Secretariat ===
The General Secretariat performs the functions leading to the proper exercise of governmental powers of the President of the Court, the Plenum and the Management Board in all matters relating to the Court of Auditors the internal system.

The General Secretariat is vested with the powers of management, processing, documentation and registration of matters within the competence of the President, the Plenum and the Management Board. The Secretary-General acts as Secretary of the Plenum and the Management Board, with the right to speak but not to vote.
