= High Court of Justice of Castile-La Mancha =

- Tribunal Superior de Justicia de Castilla-La Mancha
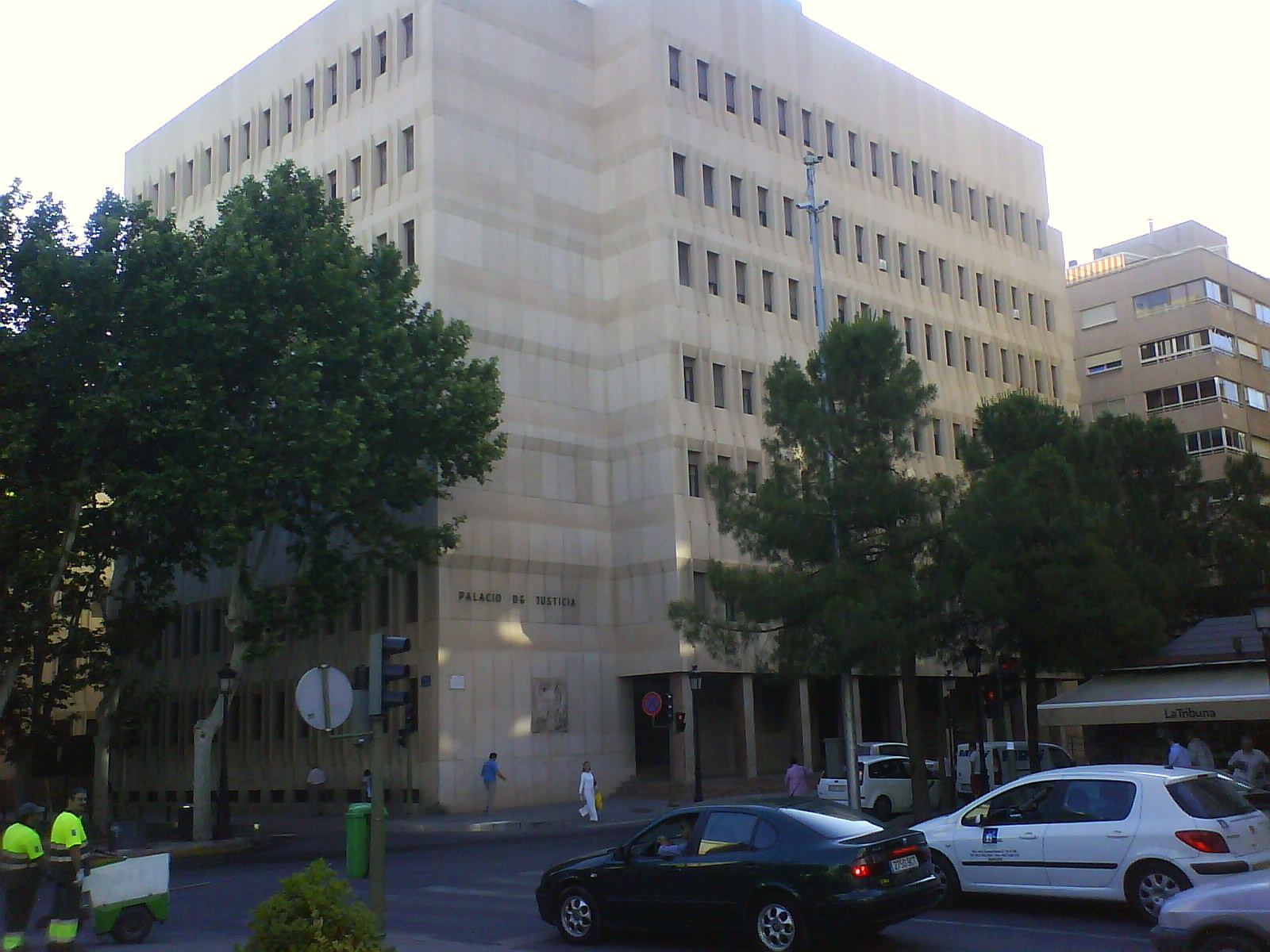
- Seat of the TSJCLM
- Interactive map of High Court of Justice of Castile-La Mancha
- 38.99482°N 1.85333°W
- Established: 1989
- Jurisdiction: Castilla–La Mancha
- Location: Palace of Justice, Albacete
- Coordinates: 38.99482°N 1.85333°W
- Website: www.poderjudicial.es

President of the High Court of Justice of Castile-La Mancha
- Currently: Vicente Rouco
- Since: 2005

The High Court of Justice of Castilla-La Mancha (Spanish: Tribunal Superior de Justicia de Castilla-La Mancha, TSJCLM) is the highest body of the judiciary in the autonomous community of Castilla–La Mancha (Spain). It is headquartered in the city of Albacete.

The presidency of the High Court of Justice of Castilla-La Mancha has been held since 2005 by Vicente Rouco, who, currently, is serving his third consecutive term.

== Composition ==
At present the High Court of Castile-La Mancha is divided into the following organs:

- Presidency
- Government
- Civil and Criminal
- Contentious-Administrative
- Social
