= Prosecutor General of the State =

Head of Spain's Public Prosecutor's Office

- Fiscal General del Estado

- Incumbent; Teresa Peramato Martín since 10 December 2025
- Prosecution Ministry
- Style: The Most Excellent (formal); Mr./Ms. Prosecutor General (informal)
- Member of: Council of State
- Reports to: Minister of Justice
- Nominator: The Government after hearing the General Council of the Judiciary and the Congress of Deputies
- Appointer: The Monarch
- Term length: 4 years, not renewable
- Constituting instrument: Spanish Constitution
- Precursor: Prosecutor of the Council of Castile
- Deputy: Lieutenant Prosecutor of the Supreme Court
- Website: www.fiscal.es

The Prosecutor General of the State (Spanish: Fiscal General del Estado), formerly known as Prosecutor of the Supreme Court, is the head of the Spanish Public Prosecution's Office (Ministerio Fiscal), the independent body within the Judiciary, that is tasked with promoting the operation of justice in defence of the rule of law, defending citizens’ rights, defending the public interest, with protecting the independence of the courts and with ensuring the public interest is satisfied through the courts.

The position is currently regulated at Article 124 of the Spanish Constitution of 1978, which states that the prosecutor general is appointed and dismissed by the Monarch, on the advice of the Government, and after hearing the General Council of the Judiciary. Since 2007, the nominated candidate must also appear before the Congress of Deputies to evaluate their suitability—although approval by Congress is not required. That is, the three powers of State participate in the appointment.

The candidate must be a Spanish jurist of recognised prestige and with more than fifteen years effective exercise of their profession. The term of the Prosecutor General is a maximum of four years and may not be renewed (except where they have held the position for less than two years) and in any event terminates when the Government completes its term. They can not be removed from office except for as defined by law (disability or serious illness, serious or repeated breach of duties, and other prohibitions).

== Duties and responsibilities ==
The prosecutor general holds the highest position and represents the Prosecution Ministry. The prosecutor general acts impartially and independently and cannot receive orders from the Government or any other body. In any case, the Government may request the prosecutor general to initiate appropriate legal proceedings before the courts to defend the public interest. In that case, the prosecutor general will decide on the appropriateness of the requested action after consulting with the Board of Prosecutors of the Supreme Court.

The prosecutor general issues orders and instructions as necessary for the service—primarily to guarantee the principle of unity of action—, the internal order of the institution, and the exercise of prosecutorial functions.

In addition, the prosecutor general is the head of the Prosecutor's Office of the Supreme Court. However, in practice, it is the Lieutenant Prosecutor of the Supreme Court who directs and coordinates this unit.

== Term and succession ==
The prosecutor general is appointed and dismissed by the Monarch, on the advice of the Government, and after hearing both the General Council of the Judiciary and the Congress of Deputies. The prosecutor general, who has a non-renewable 4 year term, has the authority to serve throughout Spain and is equivalent to the President of the Supreme Court, receiving the same salary and honors.

Furthermore, from 2024 onwards, it is prohibited to nominate for prosecutor general those persons who, in the previous five years, have held the position of government minister or secretary of state, regional minister, or who have been chair of a local government or have served as member of the Congress of Deputies or the Senate, of the European Parliament or of a regional parliament.

In cases of absence, impossibility or vacancy, the prosecutor general is replaced by the Lieutenant Prosecutor of the Supreme Court, a position established in 1844 for this purpose. This is the full line of succession:

1. Lieutenant Prosecutor of the Supreme Court.
2. Chief Prosecutor Inspector.
3. Supreme Court prosecutors, by seniority.

== Office of the Prosecutor General ==
The prosecutor general is assisted by the Office of the Prosecutor General (Spanish: Fiscalía General del Estado), which is organized as follows:

The Public Prosecutor's Office Inspectorate.

Established in 1926 and headed by the Chief Prosecutor Inspector, the Inspectorate assist the prosecutor general in the inspection of the services and personnel of the Prosecution Ministry, formulating, where appropriate, proposals for improvement, and applying the disciplinary regulations to the members of the Public Prosecutor's Career. Prosecutorial inspection is also exercised, within the scope of their respective prosecutor's office, by the chief prosecutors.

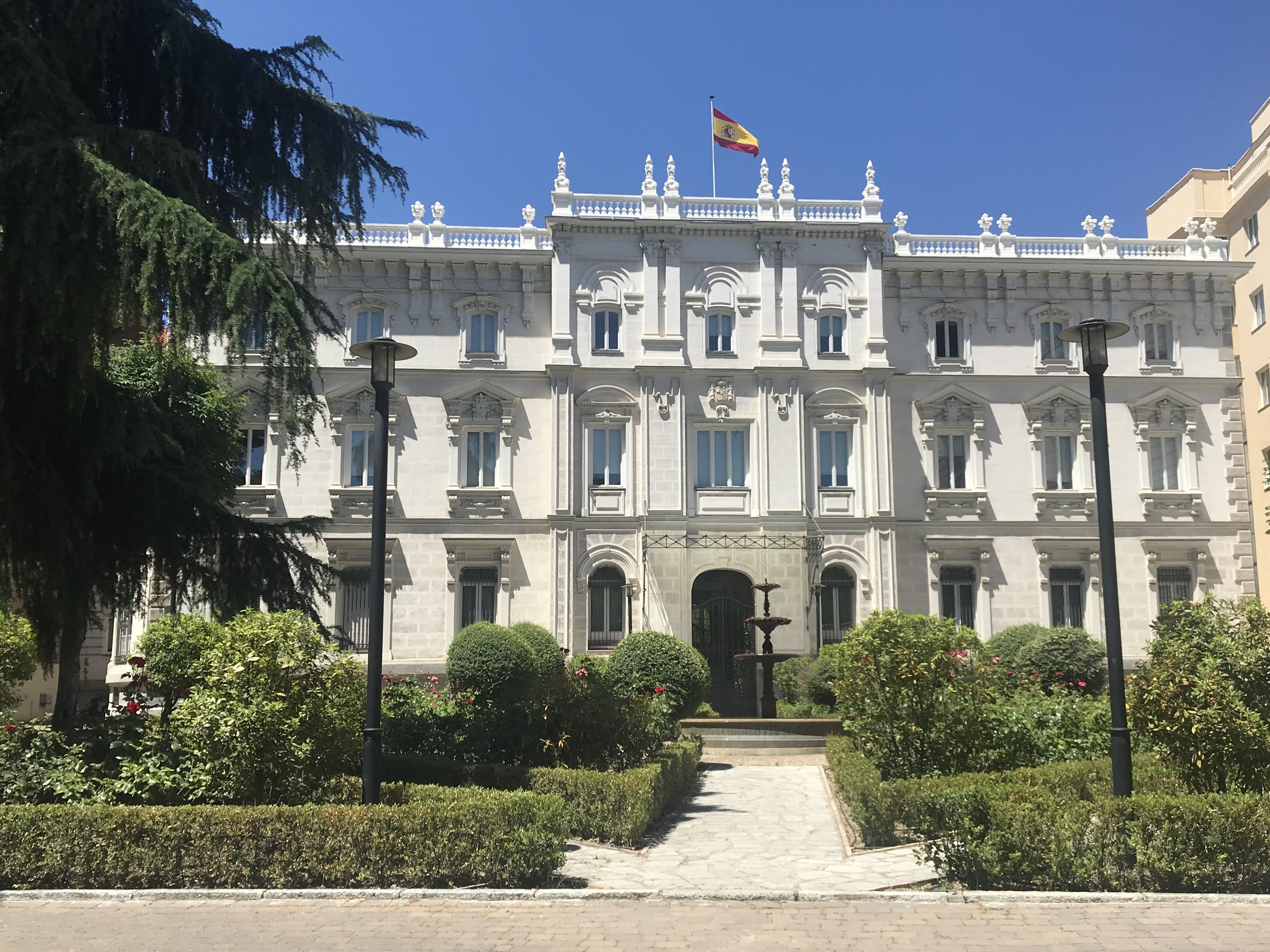
Prosecutor General Office's Headquarters

The Technical Secretariat.

Established in 1966, the Technical Secretariat carries out studies, investigations and reports of a technical-legal nature and elaborates the preparatory work for the Board of Prosecutors. It also collaborates in the training planning of the Public Prosecutor's Career, whose competence is attributed to the Center for Legal Studies, and has been conferred the functions of international legal cooperation by law attributed to the Public Prosecutor's Office.

The Support Unit.

Established in 2003 to strengthen the support bodies for the prosecutor general, it assists the prosecutor general and the Office of the Prosecutor General's prosecutors in everything related to institutional relations, information, communication and press, and citizen services. It is also responsible for statistics, ICT, material resources and documentation.

The Special Units, headed by a public prosecutor of the first-category:

International Cooperation.
Cybercrime.
Crimes against the Public Administration.
Hate Crimes and Discrimination.
Economic Crimes.
Human Rights and Democratic Memory.
Environment and Urban Planning.
Minors.
Persons with Disabilities and the Elderly.
Road Safety.
Occupational Health and Safety.
Human Trafficking and Immigration.
Violence against Women.

== History ==
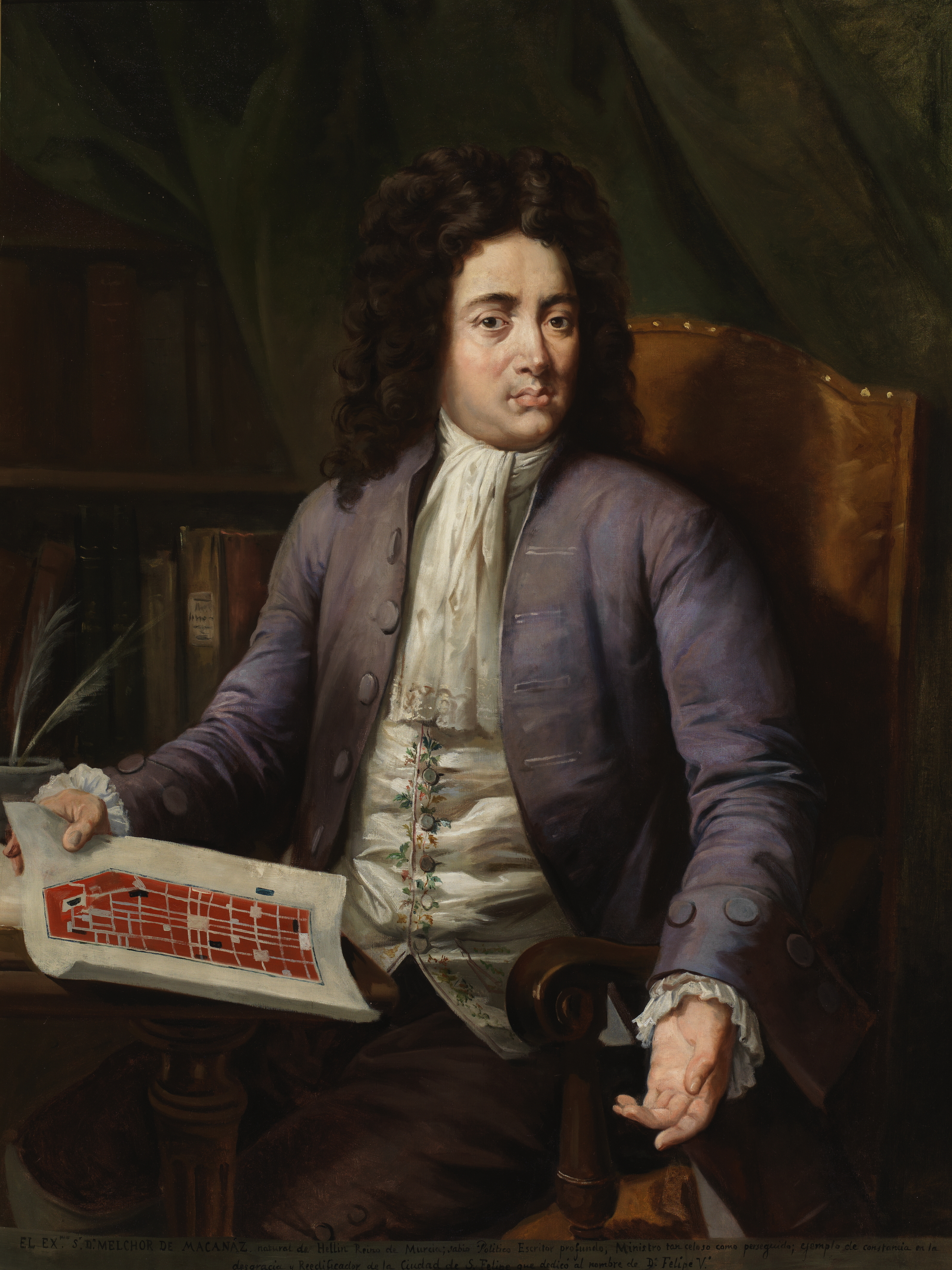
Melchor Rafael de Macanaz was the sole chief prosecutor of the Council of Castile from 1713 to 1715

The exact date when this position was first created is uncertain. The Council of Castile—the highest judicial body of the Kingdom at the time—had a Prosecutor's Office since its inception in the 14th century and, during the reign of Philip V, in 1713, the position of Prosecutor General of the Council of Castile was created—which fell to Melchor Rafael de Macanaz—, but it ended up disappearing due to the resistance of the system itself, restoring the previous organization with several prosecutors.

Thus, from 1715 onwards, it had two chief prosecutors, one for civil matters and another for criminal ones. Later, during the reign of Charles III, in 1769, another reform was carried out, structuring the prosecutor's offices not by subject matter, but by territory, creating one more prosecutor and designating them as the first, second, and third prosecutor's offices. The first prosecutor's office was in charge of all matters in Old Castile and everything that at that time comprised the Real Audiencia y Chancillería de Valladolid and the Audiencias of La Coruña and Oviedo; the second covered New Castile, which included the territory of the Royal Chancellery of Granada and the Audiencias of Seville and the Canary Islands; finally, the third was in charge of the Audiencias of Aragon, Catalonia, Valencia, and Mallorca.

With the approval of the Spanish Constitution of 1812, the Decree CLII of 17 April 1812 was passed. This decree abolished the councils and created the Supreme Court with two prosecutors. Later, Decree II of 25 March 1834 re-established the Supreme Court with three prosecutors. Royal Decree of 26 April 1844 simplified the Prosecutor's Office of the Supreme Court, reducing it to a single chief prosecutor. This reorganization was completed on 2 July 1844, when Joaquín Francisco Pacheco was dismissed and Pedro Jiménez Navarro became the sole head of the Prosecution Ministry.

Since then, there has been a single prosecutor general at the top, who has governed the Public Prosecutor's Office in a hierarchical manner. Their name has varied depending on the historical periods of Spain.

== See also ==
- Public Prosecutors Office
- General Council of the Judiciary
- Judiciary of Spain
- Justice ministry
- Minister of Justice
- Public Prosecutor (Autonomous Communities of Spain)

== Bibliography ==
- Public Prosecution Act (Organic Law 50/1981) (in Spanish). Agencia Estatal Boletín Oficial del Estado. 30 December 1981.
- "Types of legal professions-Spain". European e-Justice Portal. European Commission.
