= Judiciary of Spain =

System of law courts in Spain

The Judiciary of Spain consists of Courts and Tribunals, composed of judges and magistrates (Justices), who have the power to administer justice in the name of the King of Spain.

== Law ==
The Spanish legal system is a civil law system based on comprehensive legal codes and laws rooted in Roman law, as opposed to common law, which is based on precedent court rulings. Operation of the Spanish judiciary is regulated by Organic Law 6/1985 of Judicial Power, Law 1/2000 of Civil Judgement, Law of September 14 1882 on Criminal Judgement, Law 29/1998 of Administrative Jurisdiction, Law 36/2011 of Labour Procedure, and Organic Law 2/1989 that regulates Military Criminal Procedure.

=== Constitutional principles ===
The Spanish Constitution guarantees respect for the essential principles necessary for the correct functioning of the judiciary:

- Impartiality: to guarantee the assured effective judicial trusteeship to all citizens by the Constitution, judges must remain impartial in cases that they judge and must abstain from cases that they have no reason to enter into.
- Independence: courts and tribunals are independent of all authority or people in the exercise of jurisdictional power.
- Irremovability: judges and magistrates are irremovable and cannot be removed, suspended, separated or retired without cause and with guarantees established by law.
- Responsibility: judges and magistrates are personally responsible for their disciplinary infractions and crimes committed in the exercise of their office; this responsibility can only be required by the established legal disciplinary tract, without interference by the executive or legislative branches of the government or through ordinary legal proceedings.
- Legality: in the exercise of their jurisdictional functions, judges and magistrates are subject to the Constitution and to the rest of the laws just as other branches of government and citizens are.

== Court organization ==
The judiciary can be organised into different levels of territorial organisation:

- the national courts
- the autonomous communities of Spain
- the provinces of Spain
- the judicial district, which is the basic unit of the judiciary, covers one or several municipalities, and is served by at least one first instance and inquiry court

The judiciary can be also organised into five jurisdictional orders, which are each composed of several different circuits:

- civil jurisdiction
- criminal jurisdiction
- administrative jurisdiction
- labour or social jurisdiction
- military jurisdiction

Unipersonal courts are those courts that are controlled by one judge as opposed to the rest of the High Courts of Justice controlled by panels of judges. They are the basic units of judicial procedure in Spain.

=== Territorial ===
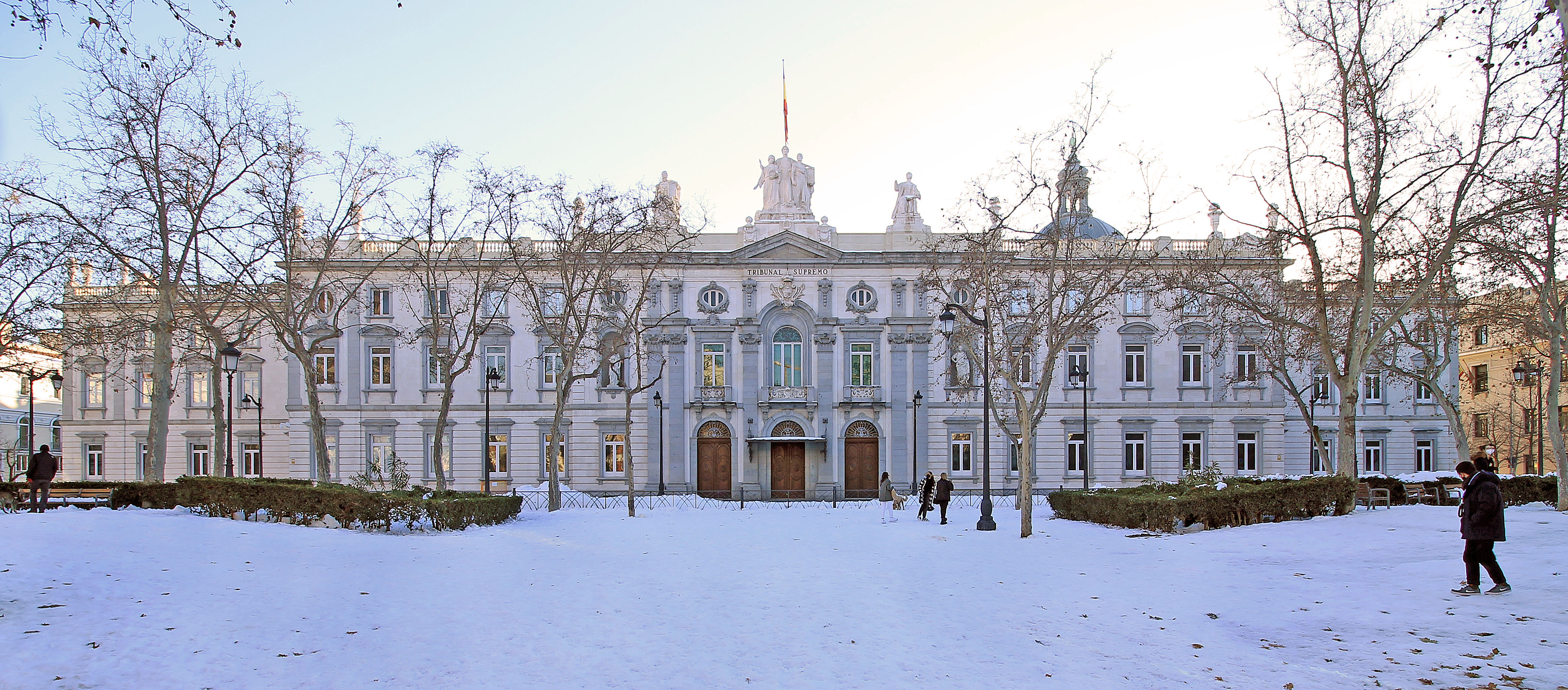
Home of the Supreme Court of Spain, in Madrid.

==== National ====
===== Supreme Court =====
The Supreme Court of Spain (Tribunal Supremo) is the highest judicial body in Spain. Composed of five chambers, it has cognizance of all jurisdictional orders and its rulings cannot be appealed, except to the Constitutional Court, when one of the parties claims that their constitutional rights have been infringed.

===== Audiencia Nacional =====
The Audiencia Nacional, based in Madrid, has jurisdiction over the entire territory of the nation. It has four Chambers, although it is composed of 3 jurisdictions, that cover:

- Appeal (no jurisdiction), will take cognizance of appeals against Criminal Jurisdiction rulings.
- Criminal jurisdiction in cases pertaining to crimes against the Spanish Crown, terrorism, organized crime, counterfeiting and crimes committed in more than one jurisdiction.
- Administrative jurisdiction, deals with appeal cases against resolutions of ministers, secretaries of state, the Council of Ministers] and the chiefs of staff of the armed forces.
- Social jurisdiction involves cases pertaining to collective bargaining agreements that cover more than the territory of one autonomous community.

The Audiencia Nacional also has specialized courts dealing with criminal inquiries, penitentiary surveillance and juvenile cases.

Some jurists consider this court to be unnecessary and a successor to the Public Order Court, the political court during the Francoist Period.

==== Autonomous communities ====
===== High Courts of Justice =====
The High Courts of Justice (Tribunal Superior de Justicia) have authority over a single autonomous community, and are the highest jurisdictional body of the autonomous community without prejudice to the Supreme Court. They are divided into three Chambers covering four jurisdictional orders:

- The First Chamber, or Civil and Criminal Chamber, is responsible for civil cases involving acts by the president of the autonomous community, members of the government council or of the legislature, and in cases of communities with their own civil law appealing against rulings by inferior courts. In the Case of Criminal Jurisdiction, to inquire, and proceed in cases related to public prosecutors, judges, magistrates, members of the legislature and government council, that relate to their activity within the autonomous community.
- The Second or Administrative Chamber: hears appeals against resolutions of state bodies not assigned to other courts, appeals against resolutions of the government of an autonomous community or its members, appeals against resolutions of legislative bodies pertaining to administration, appeals against electoral boards and appeals against first instance rulings by administrative courts.
- The Third or Social Chamber: is responsible for appeals against the rulings of first instance social courts and of cases pertaining to collective bargaining agreements that affect the territory of one autonomous community.

Some examples are:

- High Court of Justice of Cantabria
- High Court of Justice of Castile and León

==== Provincial ====
===== Audiencia Provincial =====
The Audiencia Provincial is a court that covers the territory of a single province and is responsible for two jurisdictional orders, civil and criminal.

- Civil chambers: are responsible for appeals against judgements by courts of first instance.
- Criminal chambers: judge serious criminal cases.

=== Jurisdictional ===
==== Courts of first instance ====
The courts of first instance are the basic courts of civil jurisdiction assigned to judicial districts. They hear all cases not assigned to High Courts of Justice, and also act as courts of second instance (appeal) in relation to rulings by Justices of the Peace. Judges of first instance are usually responsible for the civil registry.

==== Courts of inquiry ====
Courts of inquiry are responsible for investigating all criminal cases in order for them to be judged by criminal courts. In the case of smaller districts, first instance and inquiry courts are usually unified under the responsibility of one judge.

==== Criminal courts ====
Judge less serious crimes and misdemeanor, as well as acting as second instance (appeal) courts for the courts of Justices of the Peace. They are assigned to every judicial district – a smaller division inside of a province which includes various municipalities –.

==== Administrative courts ====
Are responsible for all cases corresponding to appeals for national and autonomic bodies not assigned by the constitution to other courts as of the appeals to resolutions issued by municipal bodies. They are assigned to a province.

==== Social courts ====
Social courts are basic courts related to labour law, and are assigned to a province.

==== Justices of the Peace ====
These courts are assigned to a municipality that is not the head of a judicial district and are presided over by a justice of the peace. Their responsibilities relate to the criminal and civil orders in minor cases.

==== Juvenile courts ====
Criminal cases committed by those who are over 14 years old and under 18 years old are the responsibility of juvenile courts and are ruled under the Organic Law 1/2000 “of Criminal Responsibilities of Minors”

==== Penitentiary surveillance courts ====
Oversee penitentiary conditions for criminals and establish penitentiary degrees or conditional freedom.

=== Constitutional Court ===
The Constitutional Court is not considered part of the judiciary, but as an independent branch of the state responsible for interpretation of the constitution. Despite this, its functionality and activities are usually similar to those of the rest of the judiciary.

== Officers of the court ==
=== Judges and magistrates ===
The Spanish Judiciary is a professional judiciary whose members are public servants divided into the three categories of judge, magistrate, and Supreme Court magistrate

Entrance to the judiciary is limited to Spanish nationals who hold a Bachelor's degree in Law issued by a Spanish university and who are not legally disbarred from applying. Applicants must pass a competitive state exam or a state exam with contest of merits. Selected applicants enter the Judiciary School where they take mandatory courses over a year, as well as carrying out practical courses as associate judges in courts and tribunals of the different jurisdictional orders. Candidates passing this course are then sworn in as judges. Magistrates of the supreme court can be drafted in a contest of merits between prestigious jurists and lawyers with more than fifteen years of professional experience. One in every five judges of the supreme court is recruited this way. Justices of the peace do not belong to the judiciary and are local people elected by the town council of the city where they were appointed.

Judges and magistrates are banned from membership of political parties and trade unions, from issuing messages of congratulation or censuring public powers or official corporations, and from attending public meetings or rallies in their role as members of the judiciary.

== Governance ==
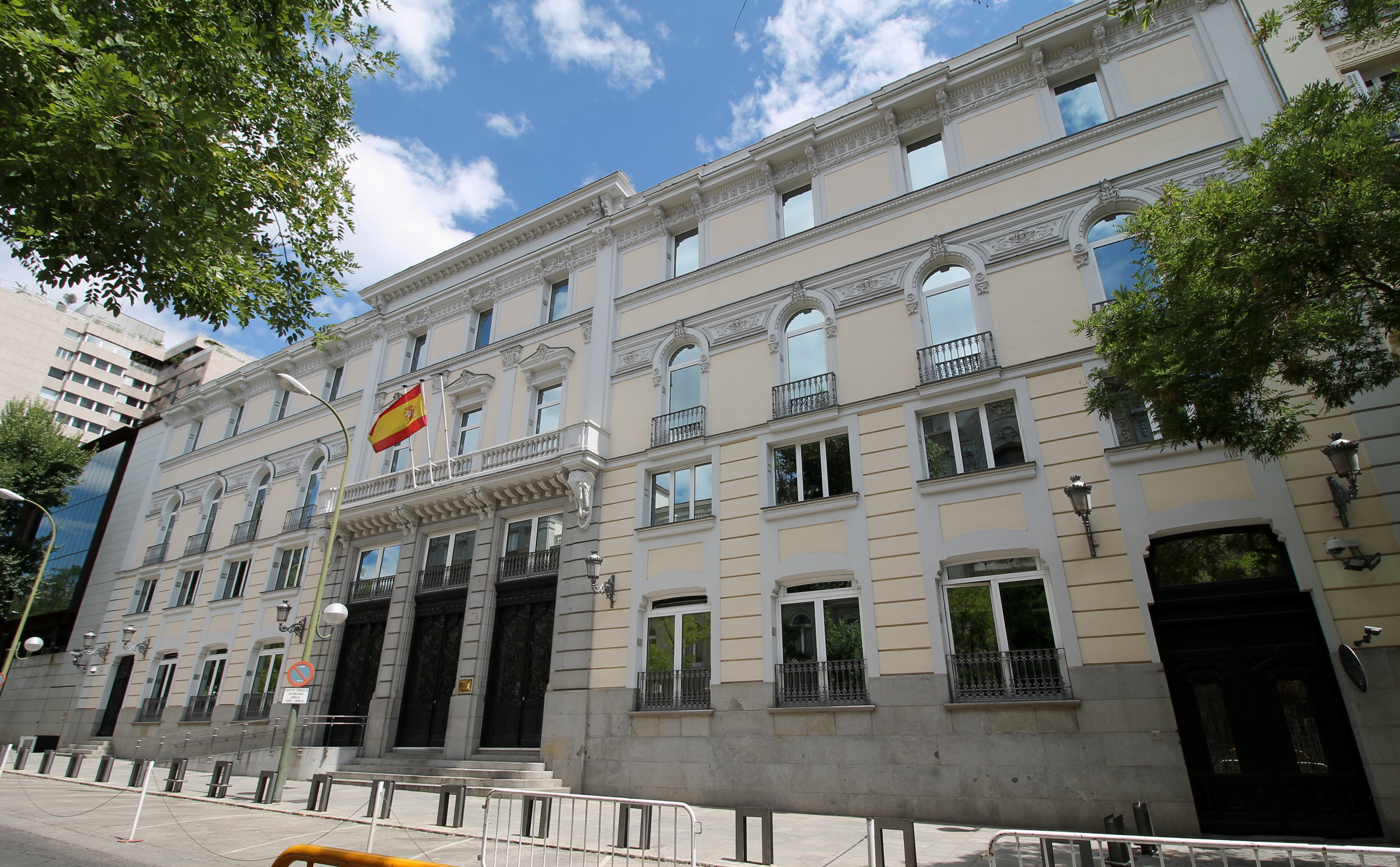
Home of the G.C.J., in Madrid.

Governance of the Spanish Judiciary is assigned to the General Council of the Judiciary. This constitutional body, although not a court in itself, is responsible for overseeing the work of all courts and tribunals of Spain, as well as of allocating judges and magistrates to each of them.

The General Council is composed of 20 members, twelve of who must be judges and magistrates and the remaining eight other jurists (lawyers, professors etc.) of renowned competence and with more than fifteen years professional experience. Of the twelve judges, six are elected by the Congress of Deputies and six by the Senate by three fifths supermajority from a list of thirty-six candidates proposed by professional associations of judges and magistrates according to the size of their membership or any independent candidate who obtains the endorsement of two percent of their colleagues. Of the eight jurists four are elected by the Congress of Deputies and four by the Senate by three fifths supermajority.
