= List of presidents of the Supreme Court of Spain =

The president of the Supreme Court is the head of the Supreme Court of Spain, an office created in 1812. Since 1980, the president of the Supreme Court is also the president of the General Council of the Judiciary, the governing body of the Judiciary of Spain. As such, the president is the defined in Section 105 of the Judiciary Organic Act as the "first judicial authority of the Nation" and "represents the Judicial Power and its governing body". That precept also establishes that the president will hold those "category and honors" corresponding to the holder of one of the three powers of the State.

== List of presidents of the Supreme Court ==
Since its creation in 1812, 48 people have served as president in 49 presidencies, and one as acting president. The first president was Ramón Posada y Soto, who served during the first period of the institution from 1812 to 1814. The shortest presidency was that of José Hevia y Noriega, who served 113 days, and the longest was that of José Castán Tobeñas, who served 22 years and 81 days. Lorenzo Arrazola y García has been the only person to serve in two different terms, the first between 1851 and 1853 and the second time from 1856 to 1864.

Eight of them have also held the position of president of the General Council of the Judiciary (CGPJ). The first holder was Federico Carlos Sainz de Robles y Rodríguez from 1980 to 1986. Carlos Lesmes was the longest-serving president of the CGPJ, serving for 8 years, 305 days, four of them ad interim. After his resignation, justice Francisco Marín Castán assumed the office ad interim, but not the position of president of the CGPJ.

The current and 49th president of the Supreme Court, as well as 9th president of the General Council of the Judiciary, is Isabel Perelló, since September 2024.

President		Tenure	Tenure length	Prior/other position	Head of State
1	Ramón Posada y Soto (1746–1815)	12 June 1812 – 4 May 1814	1 year, 326 days	Indies Councilor (1810–1812)	Ferdinand VII
Office abolished between 1814 and 1820					Ferdinand VII
2	Antonio Cano Manuel y Ramírez de Arellano (1768–1836)	27 May 1820 – 27 May 1823	3 years, 0 days	State Councilor (1820)	Ferdinand VII
Office abolished between 1823 and 1834
3	José Hevia y Noriega (1776–1834)	1 April 1834 – 23 July 1834 (died)	113 days	State Councilor (1833–1834)	Isabella II
4	Vicente Cano Manuel y Ramírez de Arellano (1774–1838)	29 July 1834 – 9 January 1838 (died)	3 years, 164 days	Minister of Grace and Justice (1821–1822)	Isabella II
5	Francisco Fernández del Pino Burgos-León (1768–1843)	10 February 1838 – 2 September 1840	2 years, 205 days	President of the Finance Supreme Court (1834–1835)	Isabella II
6	José María Calatrava y Peinado (1781–1846)	31 October 1840 – 29 July 1843	2 years, 271 days	92nd President of the Congress of Deputies (1839)	Isabella II
7	Nicolás María Garelli (1777–1850)	15 December 1843 – 12 February 1850 (died)	6 years, 59 days	Senator for Valencia (1843)	Isabella II
8	José María Manescau (1772–1850)	22 February 1850 – 22 December 1850 (died)	303 days	Senator for life (1849–1850)	Isabella II
9	Lorenzo Arrazola y García (1795–1873)	23 January 1851 – 9 April 1853	2 years, 76 days	Minister of Grace and Justice (1849–1851)	Isabella II
10	Francisco Olabarrieta y Urquijo (1784–1858)	3 June 1853 – 8 December 1854	1 year, 188 days	Magistrate of the Supreme Court (1843–1853)	Isabella II
11	José Alonso Ruiz de Conejares (1781–1855)	8 December 1854 – 13 April 1855 (died)	126 days	Minister of Grace and Justice (1854)	Isabella II
12	Claudio Antón de Luzuriaga (1792–1874)	14 November 1855 – 17 October 1856	338 days	Minister of State (1854–1855)	Isabella II
13	Lorenzo Arrazola y García (1795–1873)	17 October 1856 – 16 September 1864	7 years, 335 days	8th President of the Supreme Court (1851–1853)	Isabella II
14	Ramón López Vázquez (1807–1868)	30 September 1864 – 13 October 1868 (retired)	4 years, 15 days	Magistrate of the Supreme Court (1856–1864)	Isabella II
15	Joaquín Aguirre de la Peña (1807–1869)	13 October 1868 – 19 July 1869 (died)	279 days	Chairman of the Revolutionary Superior Junta (1868)	Francisco Serrano (regent)
16	Pedro Gómez de la Serna (1806–1871)	20 July 1869 – 12 December 1871 (died)	2 years, 145 days	7th Attorney General (1854–1856)	Francisco Serrano (regent)
16	Pedro Gómez de la Serna (1806–1871)	20 July 1869 – 12 December 1871 (died)	2 years, 145 days	7th Attorney General (1854–1856)	Amadeo I
17	Cirilo Álvarez Martínez de Velasco (1807–1878)	8 January 1872 – 6 November 1878 (died)	6 years, 302 days	Senator for Madrid (1872)	Amadeo I
17	Cirilo Álvarez Martínez de Velasco (1807–1878)	8 January 1872 – 6 November 1878 (died)	6 years, 302 days	Senator for Madrid (1872)	See presidents of the First Republic
18	Fernando Calderón Collantes (1811–1890)	6 January 1879 – 23 July 1882 (retired)	3 years, 198 days	Minister of Grace and Justice (1877–1879)	See presidents of the First Republic
18	Fernando Calderón Collantes (1811–1890)	6 January 1879 – 23 July 1882 (retired)	3 years, 198 days	Minister of Grace and Justice (1877–1879)	Alfonso XII
19	Eduardo Alonso Colmenares (1820–1888)	23 July 1882 – 31 March 1888 (died)	5 years, 252 days	Senator for life (1877–1882)	Alfonso XII
19	Eduardo Alonso Colmenares (1820–1888)	23 July 1882 – 31 March 1888 (died)	5 years, 252 days	Senator for life (1877–1882)	Alfonso XIII
20	Eugenio Montero Ríos (1832–1914)	7 May 1888 – 10 September 1888	126 days	Minister of Development (1885–1886)	Alfonso XIII
21	Hilario Igón y del Royst (?–1895)	8 July 1889 – 16 July 1892 (retired)	3 years, 8 days	Magistrate of the Supreme Court (1875–1889)	Alfonso XIII
22	Emilio Bravo y Romero (1827–1893)	29 July 1892 – 24 January 1893 (died)	179 days	Magistrate of the Supreme Court (1874–1892)	Alfonso XIII
23	Juan Francisco Bustamante (1824–1898)	30 March 1894 – 10 September 1895 (retired)	2 years, 164 days	Magistrate of the Supreme Court (1875–1889)	Alfonso XIII
24	Santos Isasa y Valseca (1822–1907)	10 September 1895 – 5 June 1901 (resigned)	5 years, 268 days	17th Governor of the Bank of Spain (1895)	Alfonso XIII
25	Eduardo Martínez del Campo y Acosta (1840–1911)	5 June 1901 – 21 October 1909 (resigned)	8 years, 138 days	Magistrate of the Supreme Court (1891–1901)	Alfonso XIII
26	José Aldecoa y Villasante (1838–1917)	17 January 1910 – 19 June 1917 (died)	8 years, 153 days	Magistrate of the Supreme Court (1883–1910)	Alfonso XIII
27	José Ciudad Aurioles (1849–1924)	15 November 1917 – 5 March 1923 (retired)	5 years, 108 days	Magistrate of the Supreme Court (1903–1917)	Alfonso XIII
28	Buenaventura Muñoz Rodríguez (1853–1925)	5 March 1923 – 7 February 1924 (retired)	339 days	Magistrate of the Supreme Court (1910–1923)	Alfonso XIII
29	Andrés Tornos y Alonso (1854–1926)	7 February 1924 – 30 November 1926 (died)	3 years, 296 days	Magistrate of the Supreme Court (1912–1924)	Alfonso XIII
30	Rafael Bermejo Ceballos-Escalera (1857–1929)	7 December 1926 – 28 January 1929 (died)	2 years, 52 days	Magistrate of the Supreme Court (1910–1926)	Alfonso XIII
31	Francisco García Goyena y Alzugaray (1859–1935)	4 February 1929 – 25 April 1930 (retired)	1 year, 80 days	Magistrate of the Supreme Court (1904–1929)	Alfonso XIII
32	Antonio Marín de la Bárcena (1858–1930)	25 April 1930 – 6 October 1930 (died)	164 days	Magistrate of the Supreme Court (1909–1930)	Alfonso XIII
33	José María Ortega Morejón (1860–1948)	23 October 1930 – 20 April 1931 (retired)	179 days	Magistrate of the Supreme Court (1918–1930)	Alfonso XIII
34	Diego Medina y García (1866–1942)	6 May 1931 – 21 August 1936 (retired)	5 years, 107 days	Magistrate of the Supreme Court (1930–1931)	See presidents of the Second Republic
35	Mariano Gómez González (1883–1951)	21 August 1936 – 1 April 1939 (exiled)	2 years, 223 days	Magistrate of the Supreme Court (1932–1936)	See presidents of the Second Republic
36	Felipe Clemente de Diego y Gutiérrez (1866–1945)	27 August 1938 – 15 August 1945 (died)	6 years, 353 days	Member of the General Codification Commission (1938)	Francisco Franco
37	José Castán Tobeñas (1889–1969)	12 September 1945 – 2 December 1967	22 years, 81 days	Magistrate of the Supreme Court (1934–1945)	Francisco Franco
38	Francisco Ruiz-Jarabo (1901–1990)	12 January 1968 – 12 June 1973	5 years, 151 days	Magistrate of the Supreme Court (1944–1945)	Francisco Franco
39	Valentín Silva Melero (1905–1982)	13 July 1973 – 4 August 1977	4 years, 22 days	Member of Parliament (1949–1973)	Francisco Franco
39	Valentín Silva Melero (1905–1982)	13 July 1973 – 4 August 1977	4 years, 22 days	Member of Parliament (1949–1973)	Juan Carlos I
40	Ángel Escudero del Corral (1916–2001)	4 August 1977 – 24 October 1980	3 years, 81 days	Magistrate of the Supreme Court (1967–1977)	Juan Carlos I
Presidents of the Supreme Court and of the General Council of the Judiciary (1980–present)
41	Federico Carlos Sainz de Robles y Rodríguez (1927–2005)	24 October 1980 – 29 October 1985	5 years, 5 days	Magistrate of the Supreme Court (1979–1980)	Juan Carlos I
42	Antonio Hernández Gil (1915–1994)	25 October 1985 – 8 November 1990	5 years, 14 days	President of the Council of State (1982–1985)	Juan Carlos I
43	Pascual Sala (1935–)	8 November 1990 – 25 July 1996	5 years, 261 days	President of the Court of Auditors (1988–1990)	Juan Carlos I
44	Javier Delgado Barrio (1932–2026)	25 July 1996 – 8 November 2001	5 years, 126 days	Magistrate of the Constitutional Court (1995–1996)	Juan Carlos I
45	Francisco José Hernando (1936–2013)	8 November 2001 – 26 September 2008	6 years, 323 days	Magistrate of the Supreme Court (1986–2001)	Juan Carlos I
46	Carlos Dívar (1941–2017)	26 September 2008 – 30 June 2012 (resigned)	3 years, 278 days	7th President of the National Court (2001–2008)	Juan Carlos I
47	Gonzalo Moliner (1944–)	21 July 2012 – 11 December 2013	1 year, 143 days	Magistrate of the Supreme Court (1998–2008)	Juan Carlos I
48	Carlos Lesmes (1958–)	11 December 2013 – 12 October 2022	8 years, 305 days	Magistrate of the Supreme Court (2010–2013)	Juan Carlos I
48	Carlos Lesmes (1958–)	11 December 2013 – 12 October 2022	8 years, 305 days	Magistrate of the Supreme Court (2010–2013)	Felipe VI
-	Francisco Marín Castán (1952–)	13 October 2022 – 4 September 2024	1 year, 327 days	Magistrate of the Supreme Court (2000–2022)	Felipe VI
49	Isabel Perelló (1958–)	4 September 2024 – present	2 years, 22 days	Magistrate of the Supreme Court (2009–2024)	Felipe VI

== See also ==
- Supreme Court of Spain
- President of the Supreme Court of Spain
- President of the Constitutional Court of Spain
- General Council of the Judiciary
