= Ángel Juanes Peces =

Spanish retired judge

1st Vice President of the Supreme Court
- In office 8 January 2014 – 22 October 2019
- President: Carlos Lesmes
- Preceded by: Office established
- Succeeded by: Dimitry Berberoff Ayuda

President of the National Court
- In office 26 March 2009 – 8 January 2014
- Preceded by: Carlos Dívar
- Succeeded by: Ricardo Bodas (Acting)

Personal details
- Born: Ángel Juanes Peces; October 24, 1947 (age 78) San Pablo de los Montes, Spain
- Education: Complutense University
- Profession: Jurist

Ángel Juanes Peces (born October 22, 1947) is a Spanish retired judge who served as the first Vice President of the Supreme Court from January 2014 to October 2019. From 2009 to 2014 he was President of the Audiencia Nacional.

== Judicial career ==
He began his career in 1978 as a judge in Don Benito, Badajoz. He was also destined to Mérida, San Sebastián, Badajoz (capital) and to the Cáceres and Badajoz Provincial Courts.

Later he was Labour magistrate in Seville, legal counsellor in the Constitutional Court and President of the High Court of Justice of Extremadura. In 2005 he was appointed Magistrate of the Military Chamber of the Supreme Court and in 2009 President of the National Court.

In 2014 it was created the office of Vice President of the Supreme Court replacing the office of Vice President of the General Council of the Judiciary. On January 8, 2014, he ceased as President of the National Court when he was appointed the 1st Vice President of the Supreme Court. His 5-years-term ended in January 2019 but because of the impossibility of renew the General Council of the Judiciary his term was extended until a new President of the Supreme Court assume office.

Juanes officially retired on October 22, 2019.

== Decorations ==
- Grand Cross of the Order of St. Raymond of Peñafort (2019)
