= Spanish General Council of the Judiciary blockade =

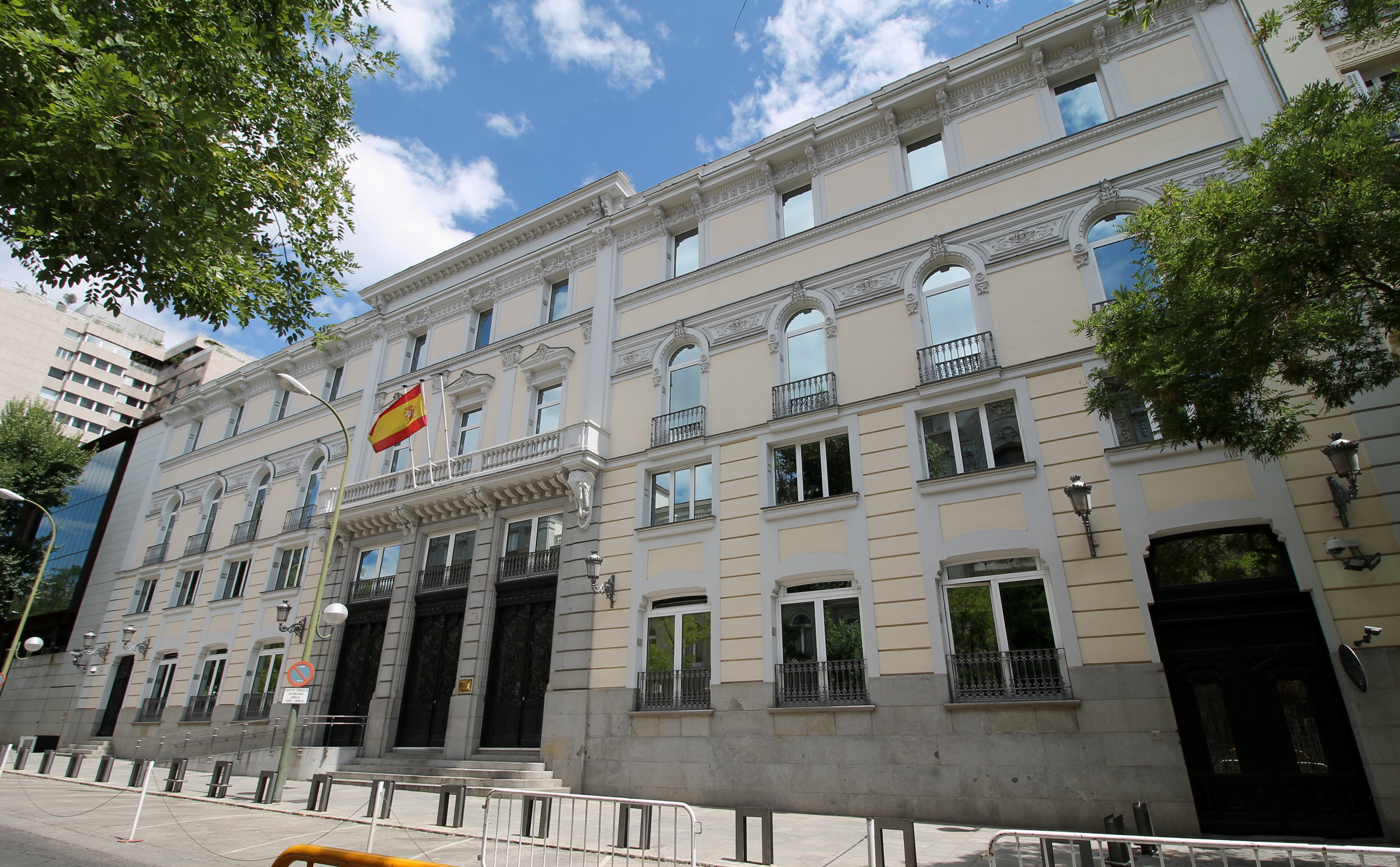
- Headquarters of the General Council of the Judiciary
- Date: 4 December 2018 – 25 July 2024 5 years, 7 months and 21 days
- Location: Spain
- Cause: End of five year term of the General Council of the Judiciary in 2018; Lack of parliamentary will to appoint a new Council
- Outcome: Resignation of the president of the Supreme Court; Numerous vacancies on the Supreme Court; Delay in the appointments to the Constitutional Court; Limited capacity of the CGPJ to appointment lower court judges

The General Council of the Judiciary blockade was a constitutional crisis that resulted in the General Council of the Judiciary (CGPJ), the governing body of the Judiciary in Spain, not being able to fulfill its functions due to the inability of the Spanish Parliament (Cortes Generales) to agree on the appointment of a new council since the term of the last council expired in 2018. The most serious of these functions that were in abeyance were the selection of the President of the Supreme Court and the appointment of judges to the Supreme Court and the Constitutional Court.

The Council has a term of five years, after which all 20 members of the council must be re-appointed. The law requires that a three fifths majority is required in both the Congress of Deputies and the Senate for their appointment, which usually means that a consensus must be reached between the Government and the Opposition. The Opposition refused to do so principally on the grounds that they wanted to change the method of appointment (to allow some members to be appointed by the judiciary themselves) but also as a bargaining chip in negotiations on other legislation. The Government had been able to pass legislation to allow some functions of the Council to be exercised without the Council but the Council remained in abeyance for five and a half years.

Similar situations occurred in the past, with blockades between 1995 and 1996, and between 2006 and 2008, both close to general elections.

After numerous negotiations and even mediation by the European Commission, an agreement between the two main political parties was reached and, on 25 July 2024, the new members of the Council assumed office, ending the crisis.

== Background ==
=== Regulations ===
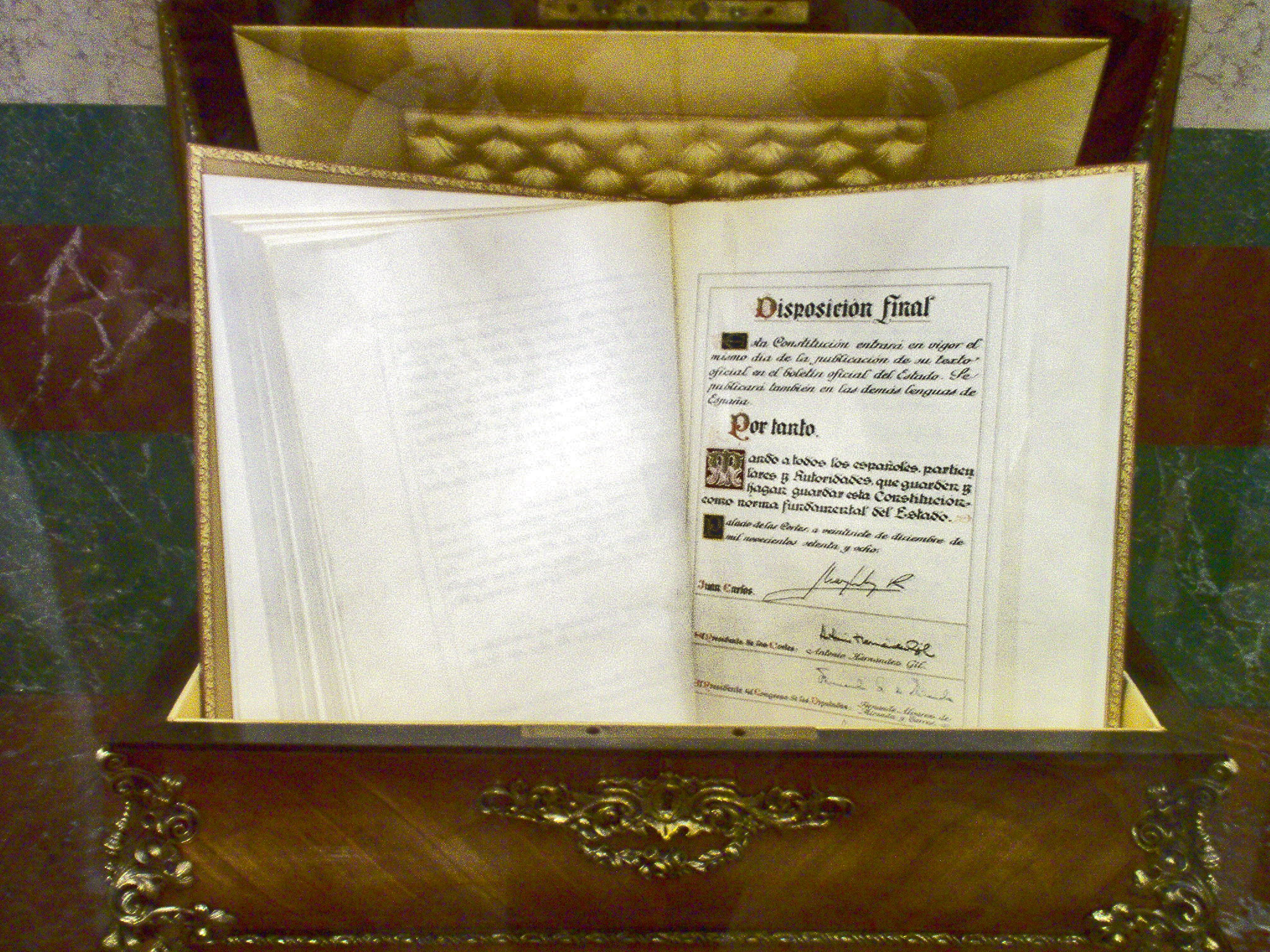
The new constitution was approved in the 1978 Spanish constitutional referendum

The Spanish Constitution establishes that the Judiciary of Spain is governed by itself through the General Council of the Judiciary. This body, chaired by the President of the Supreme Court and made up of twenty other members, has a mandate of five years. According to the constitutional text, of the twenty members mentioned, twelve must belong to the category of "Judges and Magistrates" and eight will be "lawyers and other jurists, all of them of recognized competence and with more than fifteen years of practice in their profession." Regarding the form of election, article 122 of the Constitution establishes that the eight jurists will be chosen by the Cortes Generales, in equal parts between both chambers, while the form of election of judges and magistrates leaves it open to the legal regulation made by the legislator.

At the beginning of 1980, the Cortes approved Organic Law 1/1980, of January 10, of the General Council of the Judiciary, an organic law that developed the powers of the Governing Council of judges. This law, in its twelfth and subsequent articles, established that the twelve judges and magistrates would be elected by the judges and magistrates themselves through a personal, equal, direct and the principle of a secret ballot. The law was definitively approved by the Congress of Deputies on December 28, 1979, with 258 votes in favour (mainly UCD and PSOE), 17 against and two abstentions.

Five years later, in 1985, the definitive Organic Law of the Judiciary was approved, which repealed the previous organic norm of 1980 and integrated it into this one. The main novelty that it brought with it was the modification of the system of these twelve judges and magistrates, who from the entry into force of the new law began to be elected — like the other eight members— by reinforced majorities —three fifths— of the Congress of Deputies and the Senate. This idea, initially discarded, was supported by the Spanish Socialist Workers' Party (PSOE) — which at that time had 202 seats— considered that the judiciary had a "conservative structure" and that the "parliamentary majority" should weigh more. The law was definitively approved by Congress on 28 March 1985 with 188 votes in favour, 65 against, and three abstentions.

This new law was appealed by the most conservative sector of Parliament, considering that there was a risk of "politicization", as well as by the General Council of the Judiciary itself, presenting various conflicts of competences. Its unconstitutionality was ruled out by the Constitutional Court in two judgments of 1986 (STC 45/1986, of April 17, and STC 108/1986, of July 29). Undoubtedly, the most relevant is 108/1986, which deals in depth with the question related to the election system. In this judgment, the High Court, although it sees coherence in the arguments of the appellants that there could be an implicit limit in the Constitution by establishing that eight of the members must be elected by the Cortes, while this is not the case for the twelve judges and magistrates, It is also true, according to the Court, that the text does not prohibit Parliament from legally appropriating that capacity. Likewise, the constitutional magistrates continue, the resolution of this ambiguity does not find a clear answer in the debate on the elaboration of the Constitution itself. After analysing the spirit of the regulation, the court considers that it is intended to "ensure that the composition of the Council reflects the pluralism existing within society and, especially, within the Judiciary" and that the risk of politicization would not only exist with a parliamentary election, but also with a "corporate election" among the judges and magistrates themselves, which could cause "the electoral procedure to transfer the existing ideological divisions in society to the heart of the Judicial Career."

For all these reasons, the Court concluded that "the existence and even the probability of this risk, created by a precept that makes possible, although not necessary, an action contrary to the spirit of the Constitutional Norm, seems to advise its substitution, but it is not a basis" enough to declare its invalidity, since it is constant doctrine of this Court that the validity of the law must be preserved when its text does not prevent an adequate interpretation of the Constitution. This being so in the present case, since the contested precept is susceptible to an interpretation in accordance with the Constitution and does not necessarily impose actions contrary to it, it is appropriate to declare that this precept is not contrary to the Constitution.

Subsequently, other reforms promoted by conservative governments such as those carried out by Organic Law 2/2001, of June 28, or by Organic Law 4/2013, of June 28, introduced a mixed system, in which the spirit of the 1985 reform was maintained, allowing the parliamentary election of the members of the CGPJ, but giving greater relevance in the procedure for proposing candidates to judges and magistrates, as well as to existing judicial associations.

=== Politics ===
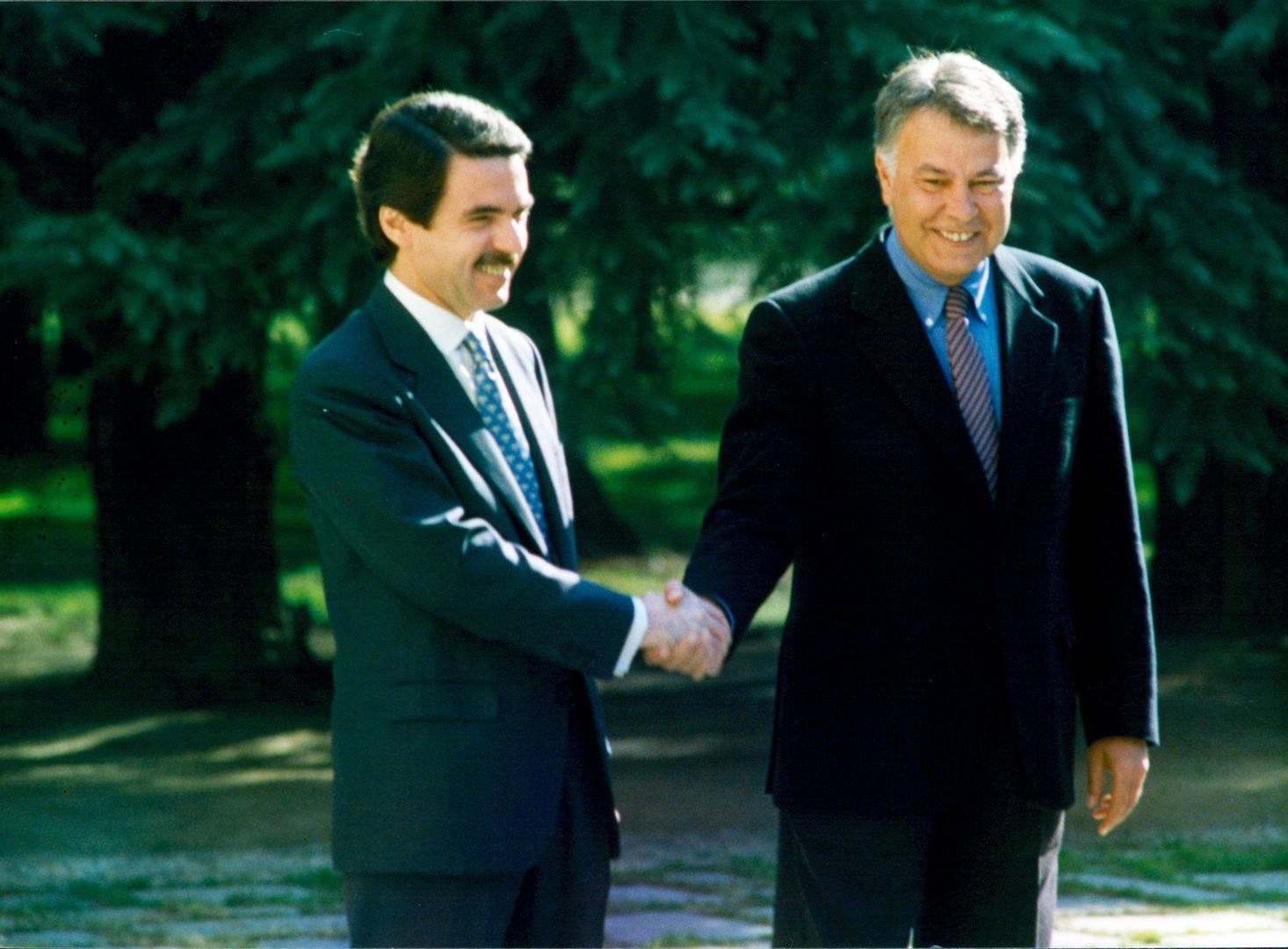
The first blockade occurred between 1995 and 1996, with Felipe González (right) as Prime Minister and José María Aznar (left) as Leader of the Opposition

As a result of the 1985 reform, the increased importance of the Legislative Branch in the election of the members of the governing body of judges and the majority necessary for it, required greater institutional loyalty and commitment on the part of the political parties, mainly the Spanish Socialist Workers' Party and the People's Party, parties that had dominated the political arena since the 1980s. It soon became clear that this would not always happen. In 1995, with Felipe González as Prime Minister of Spain and José María Aznar as leader of the opposition, the mandate of the third General Council of the Judiciary (CGPJ) expired but was not renewed until 1996, when Aznar's Popular Party won the 1996 general election and, after eight months of interim, it was renewed in a with a conservative majority. At that time, the CGPJ ended up diminished and in practice without the capacity to act, because between vacancies and resignations of members, the council was left with 11 members, insufficient to approve measures.

The second blockade took place in 2006. The Socialist Prime Minister José Luis Rodríguez Zapatero in the final period of the legislative session, and the Opposition Leader Mariano Rajoy once again refused to renew the CGPJ. It remained so for almost two years. In 2008, after the Socialists won the general election, the People's Party agreed to renew the judicial governing body.

== Development of the blockade ==
In December 2018, the five year term of the General Council of the Judiciary expired. The socialist Prime Minister Pedro Sánchez and the opposition People's Party led by Pablo Casado began negotiations on a new Council. A few months earlier, as the procedure dictates, the President of the Supreme Court Carlos Lesmes sent a list of 51 candidates to the Parliament in order to choose the twelve members as defined in the Constitution and the Organic Law of the Judiciary.

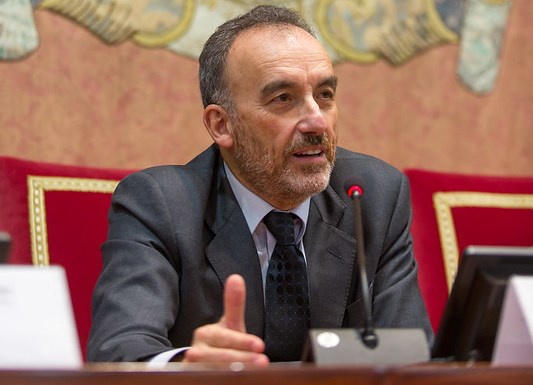
Manuel Marchena, candidate for the Presidency of the Supreme Court of Spain and the General Council of the Judiciary until the leak of voice messages.

In November 2018 the Socialist Party and the People's Party agreed to renew the Council, which according to reports would include the conservative Manuel Marchena as president. However, a week later a series of voice messages from the People's Party spokesman in the Senate, Ignacio Cosidó, was revealed, in which he described the agreement reached as "hopeful" and stated that it would allow them to control the Second Chamber of the Supreme Court from behind and presiding over room 61 — the special room to prosecute presidents or magistrates of the Supreme Chamber or the illegality procedures of political parties. After these leaks, magistrate Manuel Marchena himself refused to be the candidate to preside over said judicial bodies. His candidacy was also rejected by the various judicial associations.

After the date of 4 December 2018, the term of the General Council of the Judiciary expired. During the electoral year of 2019 —, President of the Supreme Court Carlos Lesmes urged three times through letters to the presidents of the legislative chambers to renew the Council. In the two general elections of that year, April and November, the Socialist Party of Pedro Sánchez won. At the beginning of 2020, Sánchez was re-elected prime minister by a simple majority of the Congress of Deputies, after reaching a coalition agreement with Unidas Podemos and enlist the support of other minority parties to form a new government.

During 2020, with Pablo Casado still as leader the Popular Party, it remained impossible to renew the CGPJ. Amongst the PPs demands was that the minority partner of the government coalition, Unidas Podemos, not participate in the negotiations. Another demand, that the system of election of the members of the Council be reformed (also demanded by other parties) proved more difficult. Although the first of the conditions was implicitly accepted, since Podemos did not actively participate in any of the negotiations, the Government categorically refused to reform the election system without first renewing the body.

After announcing a bill to lower the majority necessary for the renewal of the CGPJ, 32 members of the Spanish Socialist Workers' Party and the People's Party sat down again to negotiate. During 2021, the PSOE withdrew the reform and both parties managed to reach some agreements to renew other bodies such as the Constitutional Court, the Court of Auditors, the Spanish Ombudsman and the Spanish Data Protection Agency, but not to renew the CGPJ, since both parties differed in relation to reforming the method of election of the council, and neither side were willing to compromise. The Government, finally, promoted a reform of the Organic Law of the Judiciary (LOPJ) that established a special regime for the CGPJ in case of being in office, limiting their ability to make appointments while they were in that situation.

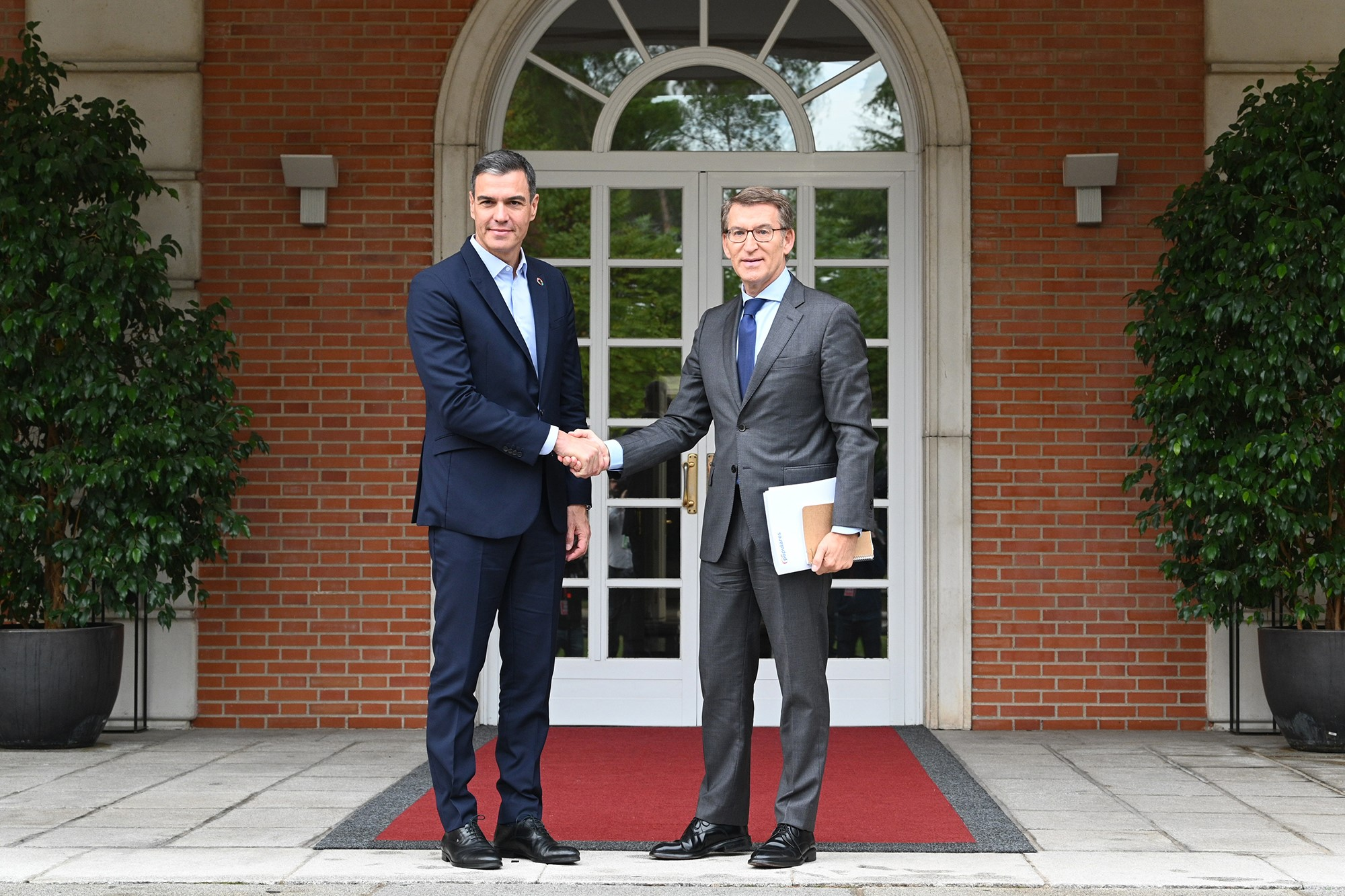
Pedro Sánchez and Alberto Núñez Feijóo in one of their meetings to negotiate the renewal of the CGPJ.

The year 2022 marked a new leadership for the People's Party, which elected Alberto Núñez Feijóo as their new leader. The negotiating positions remained similar to previous years, but both Sánchez and Núñez Feijóo set out to unravel the situation. This was hampered by news leaks from previous meetings in the middle of the year again paralyzing the negotiations.

In October 2022, the president of the Supreme Court and of the General Council of the Judiciary, Carlos Lesmes, submitted his resignation to King Felipe VI and requested his reinstatement as magistrate of the Supreme Court.

At the end of 2022 the Government announced it would present a bill to reform the crime of sedition, and the crime of embezzlement. The opposition People's Party demanded that such plans be dropped as a condition to continue negotiating the restoration of the CGPJ. The Government also presented amendments to the bill to reform the Organic Law of the Judiciary (LOPJ) to allow the Council to appoint justices of the Constitutional Court by simple majority, thereby enabling reappointment of the one third of justices whose term had expired. The problem had been that with a two-thirds majority the conservative members of the Council had used their votes to block the appointments.

Congress approved the reforms in December 2022. Faced with these reforms, the People's Party opposition filed an appeal for protection of their citizen rights before the Constitutional Court requesting the suspension of the plenary session on Friday 16. The appeal claimed that the modifications to the laws did not comply "with the constitutional doctrine on the exercise of the right of amendment and the homogeneous relationship that must exist between the amendments and the legislative initiative that is intended to be modified".

The Court upheld he appeal by six votes to five and ordered that the bill to amend the laws should be suspended as a precautionary measure. This was the first time that the Constitutional Court had ordered the Parliament in this way.

The Prime Minister described the decision as “unprecedented”. Both the President of the Congress of Deputies Meritxell Batet and the President of the Senate Ander Gil, confirmed that they would respect the decision of the Court, although they considered the decision a dangerous precedent since it meant that "the interruption of the legislative power is within the reach of a single deputy by filing an appeal" or prevent the "legitimate representatives of popular sovereignty" from "exercising their functions and debating or voting within the terms established in the legal system”. Likewise, they defended "parliamentary autonomy and the functions of the legislature" and confirmed that they would present allegations in the procedure. The following day, the Senate Bureau withdrew the amendments suspended by the High Court and confirmed that it would continue with the rest of the procedure not affected by the Court's decision.

In his traditional Christmas Eve National Speech King Felipe VI warned of the "erosion" of the institutions and called for them to be "strengthened" and "be an example of integrity and rectitude". Likewise, he urged "exercise responsibility and reflect constructively on the consequences that ignoring these risks may have for our union, our coexistence, and our institutions".

On December 27, 2022, with a three-month delay, the Plenary of the General Council of the Judiciary proposed to the king the appointment of the magistrates of the Supreme Court, César Tolosa Tribiño and María Luisa Segoviano Astaburuaga, as new magistrates of the Constitutional Court. After these nominations and the two candidates proposed by the Government — the magistrate Juan Carlos Campo and the professor Laura Díez Bueso —, the renewal of said court would be completed. The new magistrates took office before the king on 31 December 2022.

On 22 March 2023, the member of the CGPJ Concepción Sáez resigned, denouncing the "unsustainable" situation of the body, the "inability to make decisions" and the little prospect of renewal.

In January 2024, the European Commission confirmed that it has agreed to mediate negotiations between the government and the opposition. After the two main political parties reached agreement, on 25 July 2024 the new members of the Council assumed office, ending the crisis.

== Reactions ==
=== National reaction ===
At the national level, throughout the period covered by this institutional crisis, it has been characterized by a null assumption of responsibility by the main political actors as well as constant mutual reproaches. From the Government, initially formed by the PSOE and later with the inclusion of Unidas Podemos, the opposition -mainly the PP- has been accused of not having the will to negotiate a renewal and putting constant conditions that would hinder that objective. For its part, the Popular Party, with similar arguments, blamed the Government for a lack of willingness to negotiate as well as describing it as "authoritarian" and accusing it of wanting to "assault the institutions". Many of these disqualifications were also joined by parties such as Citizens or Vox (sometimes against the government, others against both parties), which from the beginning refused to participate in the "distribution of stickers" and demanded to reform the election method of the GGPJ.

=== International reactions ===
On the international stage, the political opposition has constantly called on the institutions of the European Union to align with its commitments and values. In response to these calls, the European Commission has always maintained that an immediate renovation and reduction of political influence in the election of the members of the CGPJ was necessary. In this sense, in 2022 the Commissioner for Justice, Didier Reynders, came to visit the country to try to mediate, without success.

Outside the European Union, the Council of Europe insisted on the need to renew the election system and to conclude the renewal of the CGPJ as a “priority” and criticized the lack of will to implement some of its recommendations.
