= Junta Electoral Central =

Spanish election overseer

Central Electoral Commission
- Junta Electoral Central

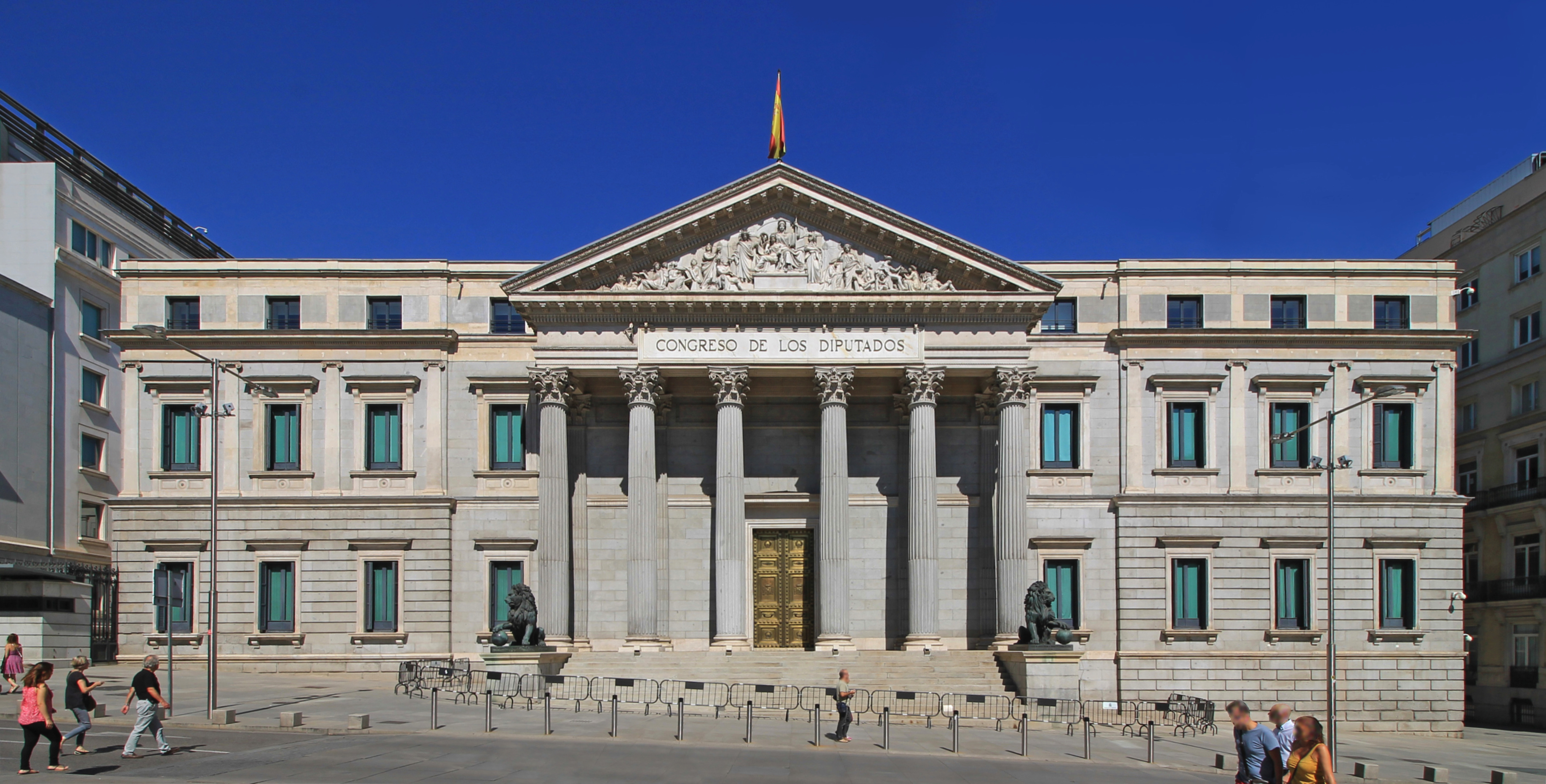
- Palacio de las Cortes, headquarters in Madrid

Agency overview
- Formed: June 26, 1890; 136 years ago
- Jurisdiction: Spain
- Status: Superior body of the electoral administration
- Headquarters: 36 San Jerónimo street Madrid, Spain
- Agency executives: Eduardo Calvo Rojas, Chair; María Pilar Teso Gamella, Deputy Chair; Fernando Galindo Elola-Olaso, Secretary
- Website: www.juntaelectoralcentral.es

The Junta Electoral Central (JEC) (English: Central Electoral Commission (Note: Its most literal translation would be "Central Electoral Board".)) is the electoral commission for elections in Spain, monitoring and registering provincial elections, district elections, those of self-governing districts and general elections. It supervises the vote at polling stations. Its mission is to "ensure the transparency of the electoral process and monitor the performance of the Electoral Census Office."

It is based in Madrid, and was created by Spanish law on 26 June 1890 as Central Commission of the Electoral Census (Spanish: Junta Central del Censo Electoral). During the transition to democracy, the Royal Decree-Law 20/1977 of 18 March, on Electoral Regulations, renamed it as Junta Electoral Central.

== History ==
As early as the time of the Cortes of Cádiz, an Electoral Commission existed, tasked with overseeing the appointment of the first elected members of the Cortes Generales. However, this board was not permanent, and its chair was the head of the Supreme Central Junta.

Eight decades later, the Law of 26 June 1890, established what is known today as the Central Electoral Commission—which, between 1890 and 1977, was named "Central Commission of the Electoral Census".

This electoral law created the first electoral administration—very similar to the current one—organized at State level by the Central Commission, based in Madrid, as well as at the provincial and local levels, each with its own respective commissions. All of these were permanent bodies. Unlike today, these commissions were presided over, respectively, by the President of the Congress of Deputies, the presidents of the Provincial Councils, and the mayors. The Central Commission was effectively constituted on 5 July 1890, under the presidency of Manuel Alonso Martínez.

Following the electoral law of 1907, the Central Commission was no longer presided over by the President of the Congress; instead, that role was assumed by the President of the Supreme Court. The same change applied to the other commissions, which were then headed by the presiding officers of the judicial bodies within their respective jurisdictions. Furthermore, efforts were made to ensure greater independence from the administration and the government by appointing prominent figures as members of the commission—such as the presidents of the Royal Academy of Moral and Political Sciences, the Royal Academy of Jurisprudence and Legislation, and the Institute of Social Reforms, as well as the rector of the Central University, the dean of the Madrid Bar Association, and the director of the Geographic and Statistical Institute. Additionally, responsibility for overseeing the electoral census was assigned to the Geographic and Statistical Institute.

The system remained in place, without any major changes, until the democratic transition. Most of the provisions of the 1907 law were ratified by Royal Decree-Law 20/1977, of March 18, on Electoral Rules, which renamed it as "Central Electoral Commission". Furthermore, the electoral governing bodies were depoliticized as much as possible, with a greater role given to prominent legal experts—not only judges, professors or legal scholars, but also the presidents of the Royal Academy of Moral and Political Sciences, the Royal Academy of Jurisprudence and Legislation, the General Council of Spanish Lawyers, and the Board of Deans of the Notarial Colleges of Spain—in the case of the Central Electoral Commission—, as well as their provincial and local-level counterparts for the other commissions. Local electoral commissions were abolished and replaced by district electoral commissions, based in the judicial districts.

Following the adoption of the current Spanish electoral legislation in 1985, the Central Electoral Commission was no longer presided over by the President of the Supreme Court. It is now composed of thirteen members—five Supreme Court justices and five professors of Law, Political Science or Sociology—appointed by the General Council of the Judiciary and the Congress of Deputies. The chair and deputy chair of the Commission are elected by their peers from among the judicial members. The Secretary-General of the Congress of Deputies serves as secretary of the Electoral Commission. Finally, this 1985 law introduced, for the first time, the possibility of establishing Regional Electoral Commissions to oversee regional electoral regulations and supervise electoral processes within their respective jurisdictions.

== Powers ==
Article 19 of the 1985 Electoral Law grants the Commission the following powers:

1. To direct and supervise the operations of the Electoral Census Office.
2. To issue binding rulings on inquiries submitted by provincial and regional electoral commissions.
3. To harmonize the interpretive criteria used by provincial and regional electoral commissions in the application of electoral regulations.
4. To resolve complaints, claims, and appeals submitted to it.
5. To ensure that candidate lists comply with regulations regarding electoral accounts and expenditures, from the calling of an election until 100 days after it has taken place.
6. To exercise disciplinary authority over all individuals officially involved in electoral operations.
7. To address infractions occurring during the electoral process—provided they do not constitute criminal offenses—and impose fines up to the maximum amount established by law.
8. To issue credentials to Deputies, Senators, Provincial Deputies and Island Councilors in the event of a vacancy due to death, incapacity, or resignation, once the mandates of the provincial and local electoral commissions have concluded.

== Composition ==
It comprises eight judges from the Supreme Court, five active professors of law and sociology, a secretary, and the director of the Electoral Census Office (part of the National Statistics Institute), who has a casting vote but is otherwise a sleeping partner.

=== Current commission ===
Central Electoral Commission (since 2025)
Office	Occupation	Nominated by	Name	Appointment
Chair	Magistrates of the Supreme Court	General Council of the Judiciary	Eduardo Calvo Rojas	4 February 2025
Deputy Chair	Magistrates of the Supreme Court	General Council of the Judiciary	María Pilar Teso Gamella	4 February 2025
Members	Magistrates of the Supreme Court	General Council of the Judiciary	Javier Hernández García	4 February 2025
Members	Magistrates of the Supreme Court	General Council of the Judiciary	Carmen Lamela Díaz	4 February 2025
Members	Magistrates of the Supreme Court	General Council of the Judiciary	Vicente Magro Servet	4 February 2025
Members	Magistrates of the Supreme Court	General Council of the Judiciary	Fernando Marín Castán	4 February 2025
Members	Magistrates of the Supreme Court	General Council of the Judiciary	Concepción Rosario Ureste García	4 February 2025
Members	Magistrates of the Supreme Court	General Council of the Judiciary	Fernando Cerdá Albero	2 July 2026
Members	Professors of Law, Political Science, or Sociology	Congress of Deputies	Francisco Javier García Roca	4 February 2025
Members	Professors of Law, Political Science, or Sociology	Congress of Deputies	María Luz Martínez Alarcón	4 February 2025
Members	Professors of Law, Political Science, or Sociology	Congress of Deputies	María da Alba Nogueira López	4 February 2025
Members	Professors of Law, Political Science, or Sociology	Congress of Deputies	Javier Tajadura Tejada	4 February 2025
Members	Professors of Law, Political Science, or Sociology	Congress of Deputies	Carlos José Vidal Prado	4 February 2025
Secretary	Secretary-General of the Congress of Deputies		Fernando Galindo Elola-Olaso	3 November 2023
President of the National Statistics Institute and Director of the Electoral Census Office			Elena Manzanera Díaz	2 August 2022

=== Presidents ===
Before 1985, the Commission was chaired by the President of the Congress of Deputies (1890–1907) and by the President of the Supreme Court (1907–1985).

- 1985 – 1987: Paulino Martín Martín
- 1987 – 1991: Francisco Tuero Bertrand
- 1991 – 1993: José Hermenegildo Moyna Ménguez
- 1993 – 1994: Ángel Rodríguez García
- 1994 – 1997: Francisco Soto Nieto
- 1997 – 1999: José Luis Albacar López
- 1999 – 2000: Juan Antonio Xiol Ríos
- 2000 – 2004: Enrique Cáncer Lalanne
- 2004 – 2008: José María Ruiz-Jarabo Ferrán
- 2008 – 2012: Antonio Martín Valverde
- 2012 – 2017: Carlos Granados Pérez
- 2017 – 2019: Segundo Menéndez Pérez
- 2019 – 2020: Antonio Jesús Fonseca-Herrero Raimundo
- 2020 – 2024: Miguel Colmenero Menéndez de Luarca
- Since 2025: Eduardo Calvo Rojas
