= Vice President of the Supreme Court (Spain) =

Second highest authority of the Supreme Court of Spain

- Coat of Arms of Spain
- Incumbent; Dimitry Berberoff Ayuda since 8 October 2024
- Supreme Court of Spain
- Style: The Most Excellent
- Member of: Governing Chamber of the Supreme Court
- Reports to: President of the Supreme Court
- Seat: Salesas Reales Convent, Madrid
- Nominator: General Council of the Judiciary
- Appointer: Monarch
- Term length: 5 years, renewable
- Constituting instrument: Act 4/2013
- Formation: 29 June 2013; 13 years ago
- First holder: Ángel Juanes Peces
- Website: www.poderjudicial.es

The Vice President of the Supreme Court is the second highest authority of the Supreme Court of Spain and its main duty is to support and replace the President as head of the Court. The vice president is appointed by the Monarch after being nominated by the General Council of the Judiciary at the proposal of the president of the council. It has a term of five years.

As the second authority and the main assistant to the president, the legislation established that the vice president is the person responsible for replacing the president in cases of vacancy, absence, illness or other legitimate reasons. The office of vice president was created in 2013 and it must not to be confused with the Vice President of the General Council of the Judiciary. The office of Vice President of the Supreme Court was created to replace the CGPJ Vice Presidency. Likewise, the president may delegate in the vice president the superior direction of the Technical Office of the Supreme Court, as well as other functions, but always for a justified reason.

The vice president, due to the fact of being it, is a born member of the Governing Chamber of the Supreme Court and it is responsible for proposing to the Chamber and to the president the adoption of those decisions aimed at guaranteeing the correct functioning of the Supreme Court, as well as ensuring the exact execution of the agreements adopted by the Governing Chamber.

The current Vice President of the Supreme Court is Dimitry Berberoff Ayuda, who was elected unanimously by the members of the General Council of the Judiciary on 25 September 2024.

== History ==
=== Origin ===
The office of Vice President of the Supreme Court was created in 2013 to replace the office of Vice President of the General Council of the Judiciary. According to the 2013 law that created it, "the existence of a Vice President is particularly important to the Supreme Court, due to that in the last thirty years the CGPJ has almost completely absorbed the time of the successive Presidents, de facto depriving the former of a unitary presidency". That is to say, the office of Vice President of the CGPJ was useless because the Council occupied most of the time of the president and the vice president had no duties. Moreover, the Supreme Court remained on numerous occasions without his head.

==== Vice President of the CGPJ ====
Like said before, the office of Vice President of the Supreme Court must not to be confused with the office of Vice President of the GCPJ, and the current Supreme Court' Vice President is never the Vice President of the GCPJ. The president, however, it is. The office of GCPJ Vice President existed from 1985 to 2013. Its main task was to replace the president of the council and it was appointed by the Monarch at the request of the CGPJ by a majority of three fifths.

From its creation to its suppression, six people held the position of Vice President of the CGPJ:

1. Adolfo Carretero Pérez (1985)
2. Manuel Peris Gómez (1985–1990)
3. José Luis Manzanares Samaniego (1990–1996)
4. Luis López Guerra (1996–2001)
5. Fernando Salinas Molina (2001–2008)
6. Fernando de Rosa Torner (2008–2014)

=== First holder and five years of vacancy ===
The first holder of the office was appointed by the Plenary of the General Council of the Judiciary in January 2014. Supreme Court' President Carlos Lesmes nominated Ángel Juanes Peces, a magistrates that was serving as President of the National Court since 2009 and before as member of the Military Chamber of the Supreme Court from 2005 to 2009. The 5-years-term of Juanes was expected to end in January 2019 but because of the impossibility of renew the General Council of the Judiciary because of the parliament deadlock, the Plenary of the Council agreed to extend his term until October 2019, when Juanes reached the mandatory retirement age.

In October 2019, the President of the Supreme Court approved the mandatory retirement of Juanes and he temporary divided the powers of the office between two positions: the Chair of the Military Chamber, Ángel Calderón, and the magistrate and member of the CGPJ, Rafael Fernández Valverde. The first one assumed the powers related with the Supreme Court, while the second one assumed the powers related with the council.

In the following five years, two other magistrates held this position, both on an interim basis. After Magistrate Calderón Cerezo, the president of the Social Chamber, Jesús Gullón Rodríguez, briefly served as vice president between 12 June to 25 June 2025, the latter being the date of his retirement. Subsequently, Judge Francisco Marín Castán, president of the Civil Chamber of the Supreme Court, assumed responsibility, combining this with presiding over the Supreme Court between October 2022 and September 2024, following the resignation of Carlos Lesmes. Finally, in September 2024 the CGPJ was renewed, and the new president, Isabel Perelló, proposed the magistrate Dimitry Berberoff Ayuda, who took office on 8 October 2024.

== Appointment ==
According to the Organic Act of the Judiciary of 1985, amended in 2013 to include the figure of the vice president, the vice president will be elected in the first ordinary Plenary meeting of the General Council of the Judiciary (CGPJ). To be appointed vice president, the Plenary must approve the candidate chosen by the President of the Supreme Court by absolute majority. If this majority is not reached, the president must propose another candidate.

In order to be a candidate, the candidate must have the status of Magistrate of the Supreme Court, be on active duty and meet the requirements to be President of a Supreme Court Chamber. The application must be public and communicated to the members of the CGPJ one week in advance.

=== Dismissal ===
In accordance with Section 589 of the Organic Act of the Judiciary, apart from the end of the term of office, the vice president may be dismissed by the Plenary of the council with a justified reason if approved by three fifths of it. If, once their term has ended, another vice-president has not been elected, the acting vice-presidency is assumed by the most senior president of Chamber of the Supreme Court, as happened in 2019.

== List of vice presidents ==
Acting vice president

Nº	Nombre	Inicio	Final
1	Ángel Juanes Peces	8 January 2014	22 October 2019
-	Ángel Calderón Cerezo	22 October 2019	12 June 2020
-	Jesús Gullón Rodríguez	12 June 2020	25 June 2020
-	Francisco Marín Castán	25 June 2020	8 October 2024
2	Dimitry Berberoff Ayuda	8 October 2024	Incumbent
