= Enrique Cancer Lalanne =

Spanish magistrate (1935–2025)

Enrique Cáncer Lalanne (15 February 1935 – 14 May 2025) was a Spanish judge and academic, justice of the Supreme Court of Spain between 1986 and 2010 and president of the Central Electoral Commission between 2000 and 2004.

== Early life and career ==
Cáncer was born on 15 February 1935.

He joined the Regional and Municipal Judges Corps by open competition in 1966 and held posts in Benabarre and Tremp, and in the Provincial Courts of Gran Canaria and Pamplona until 1986. That year, on 5 November, at the request of the General Council of the Judiciary, he was appointed a magistrate of the Supreme Court. Cáncer held that position until 2010, and since 2005 as justice emeritus.

He was president of the Central Electoral Commission between 2000 and 2004.

He combined his judicial activity at the University of Pamplona and at the Universidad CEU San Pablo in Madrid, where he taught Administrative Law.

== Personal life and death ==
His daughter, Pilar, was appointed justice of the Supreme Court in February 2025, in the Third Chamber (Administrative Litigation).

He was fond of hunting and some of his exploits as a young man were reported in local newspapers.

Cáncer died in Barbastro on 14 May 2025, at the age of 90.
