= José Castán Tobeñas =

Spanish jurist and judge

José Castán Tobeñas (1889–1969) was a Spanish jurist and judge.

After studies in Zaragoza and a much-lauded doctoral thesis submitted in Madrid, he taught civil law at Zaragoza, Madrid, Murcia, Barcelona and Valencia. He was appointed to the Supreme Court in 1933, and dismissed in 1936 during the Spanish Civil War.

In 1939, the Franco government appointed Tobeñas to a chair in Zaragoza and, in 1940, again to the Supreme Court, which he reorganised and presided over from 1945 to 1967. In addition, he led several legal reform projects and edited Spain's principal legal journal, Revista general de legislación y jurispridencia. His principal works, Derecho civil español común y foral (1922) and Derecho civil (1941/42) became standard textbooks.

Castán' judicial philosophy was guided by humanist and natural law ideas. He frowned on legal positivism and sought to soften the harshness of the law with individually tailored, socially responsible judgments of an independent judiciary. His work and personality caused Tobeñas to be considered Spain's leading jurist in the years after the Civil War. Even today, his name remains synonymous with Spanish civil law.
