= Moliner =

Moliner is a surname. Notable people with the surname include:

- Empar Moliner (born 1966), Spanish writer and journalist
- Gonzalo Moliner (born 1944), Spanish judge
- Jacques Moliner (born 1967), French rugby player
- María Moliner (1900–1981), Spanish librarian and lexicographer
- Ouida Ramón-Moliner (1929–2020), Irish-born Canadian anaesthetist
