= Felipe Clemente de Diego y Gutiérrez =

Spanish jurist

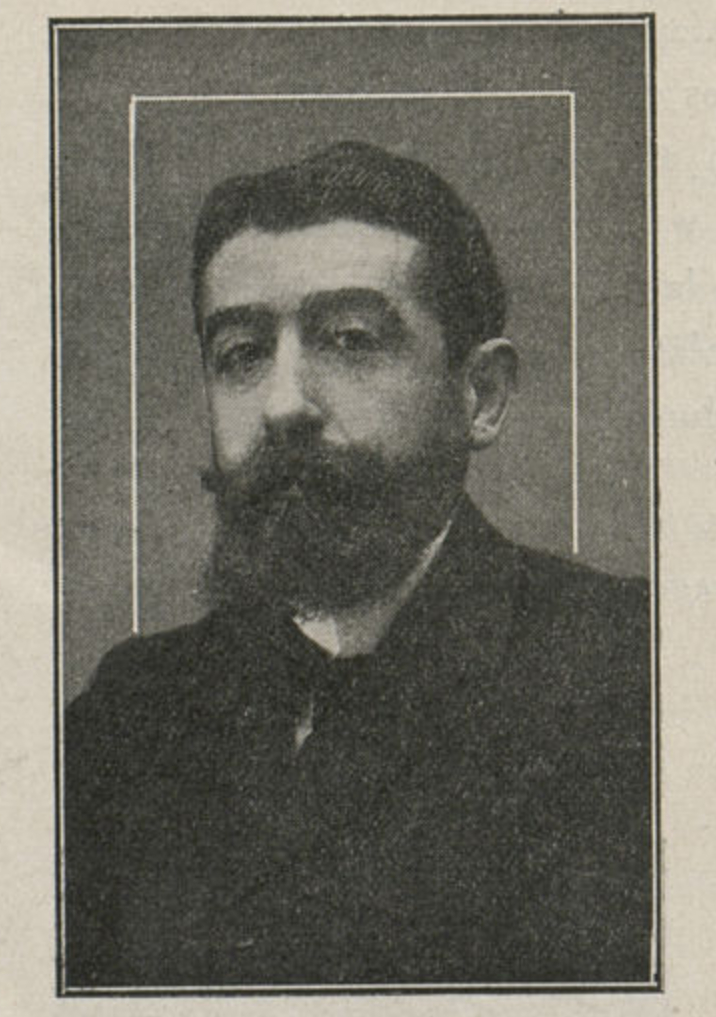
Clemente de Diego in 1927

Felipe Clemente de Diego y Gutiérrez (1866 – 1945) was a Spanish jurist who served as the 36th president of the Supreme Court from 1938 to 1945. He also served as member of parliament several times between 1919 and 1945.

Clemente de Diego taught Roman law in Santiago in 1897–99 and civil law in Valladolid, Barcelona and Madrid until 1936. He co-founded the Revista de derecho privado, later the most significant civil law journal in Spain, in 1913. During the Civil War, in 1938, the rebel government appointed him as president of the Supreme Court, a post he held until his death.

The principal work of Clemente de Diego is the six-volume Curso elemental de Derecho civil español común y foral (1920–23). He also engaged in the study of the philosophy of law, promoting the adherence to an ideal of natural law founded on Christian ethics in the practice of law, and denouncing legal formalism as the reason for the perceived crisis of the legal system prior to the civil war.
