= Pedro Gómez de la Serna =

Spanish jurist and politician

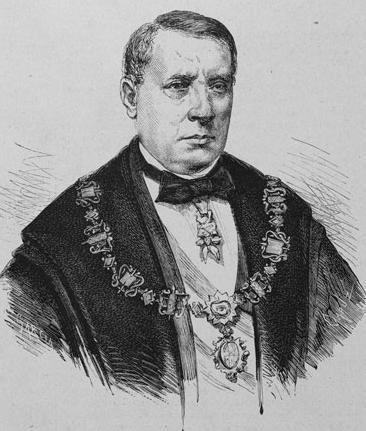
image of Pedro Gómez de la Serna

Pedro Gómez de la Serna (21 February 1806 – 12 December 1871) was a Spanish jurist and politician, and a leading force for the modernization of 19th-century Spanish law.

After studies of civil and canon law at the University of Alcalá, where he later also taught, Gómez de la Serna was employed in the judicial administration and was appointed provincial governor of Guadalajara in 1836. A follower of the Progressive Party, he was appointed Minister of the Interior in 1843 as part of the last cabinet of the regency of Baldomero Espartero, whom he followed into exile to London. He returned to Spain in 1846 and again briefly served in government as Minister of Justice in 1854 under Salustiano Olózaga. From 1854 to 1856, he served as prosecutor of the Supreme Court, and became president of the Supreme Court in 1869. He also served as rector of the University of Madrid and president of the Real Academia de Jurisprudencia y Legislación, and was a member of several other Royal Academies. On multiple occasions he was elected to the Congress of Deputies and the Senate of Spain.

Gómez de la Serna was a noted scholar in the fields of legal theory and legal history. He wrote the prescribed university textbooks on the principles of law and on Roman law, and developed one of the first systematic overview of Spanish civil and criminal law, thereby helping to establish modern Spanish legal scholarship. He was also one of the leading drafters of the first Spanish code of civil procedure of 1855.

He was awarded the Order of the Golden Fleece and the Grand Cross of the Order of Charles III.
