= Spanish Courts for Violence against Women =

The Courts for Violence Against Women (Spanish: Juzgados de Violencia Sobre la Mujer) are Specialised criminal courtrooms associated to the Inquiry Courts, established by the Organic Law 1/2004 of Comprehensive Protection Measures against Violence against women. Extraordinarily these courts also have powers in the civil jurisdiction acting as Courts of First Instance and Inquiry. They are associated to the Judicial District, even though one court can be created to cover the area of two or more districts.

== Powers ==
The Courts for Violence Against Women have the power to inquire on the following crimes:

- Homicide (manslaughter or murder), abortion, battery, harm to the fetus, crimes against freedom, crimes against moral integrity, sexual crimes or any other crime committed by the present or past spouse or significant other, independently or living together, as well as against minor and unable that are under the legal custody or care of the offender.
- On crimes against family obligations when the victim is one of the mentioned before

To rule on misdemeanor cases when the victim is one of the before mentioned.

They establish any legal measures necessary to protect the victims. In the Civil jurisdiction, and as long the process is due to the initiation of a criminal process in these courts, the courts have the power to know in the business related to family law.

== Staff ==
Staff associated with this Court are given special training in relation to gender violence due to the trauma suffered by victims, and the existence of emotional links with the offender. Additionally, the Courts are usually assisted by psychologists and social assistants.

== Criticism and support ==
The creation of this court, founded and strongly supported by Women's institutions, has generated quite a range of criticism within Spanish society.

A non-binding legal report by the General Council of the Judiciary (CGPJ), considered that the law on which the court is based violated the principle of equality as established in the Constitution. Many associations, like the Conservative the Professional Association of Magistrates (APM) or divorced fathers groups are opposed to the courts. As to March 2008, over 200 Spanish Judges have challenged the constitutionality of the law at the Constitutional Court via the constitutionality question procedure.

The law was founded and has extensive support of feminist organizations and specialised jurists, that believe it to be a necessary step in their goal of "eradicating" gender violence against women in Spain, however official figures from the National Institute of Statistics show that deaths have steadily increased since the start of the campaign.

In May 2008 the Constitutional Court ruled the constitutionality of the Organic Law for the Prevention of Violence Against Women, discarding any legal criticism of the law.

In 2019, a conservative Catholic Spanish group launched a bus campaign against 'Feminazis' with an image of lipstick-wearing Hitler, as a protest against sexist laws on domestic violence, demanding that laws are made gender-neutral.

== See also ==
- Violence against women
- Domestic violence
- Spanish Judiciary
