= Gonzalo Moliner =

Spanish judge

The Most Excellent Gonzalo Moliner Tamborero
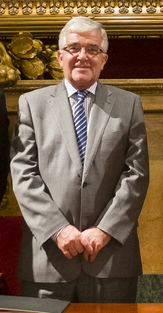

47th President of the Supreme Court
- In office 23 July 2012 – 11 December 2013
- Monarch: Juan Carlos I
- Preceded by: Carlos Dívar
- Succeeded by: Carlos Lesmes

7th President of the General Council of the Judiciary
- In office 23 July 2012 – 11 December 2013
- Monarch: Juan Carlos I
- Vice President: Fernando de Rosa Torner
- Preceded by: Carlos Dívar
- Succeeded by: Carlos Lesmes

Personal details
- Born: Gonzalo Moliner Tamborero; 20 July 1944 (age 81) Fuente la Reina, Spain

Gonzalo Moliner Tamborero (born 20 July 1944) is a retired Spanish judge. He served as the 47th President of the Supreme Court and 7th President of the General Council of the Judiciary from July 23, 2012, to December 11, 2013. Moliner was elected president to complete the 5-year-term of the council after the resignation of Carlos Dívar.

Previous to this, he had served as judge in several cities and between 1990 and 1998 he served as judge in the High Court of Justice of the Valencian Community. In 1998 he became a Supreme Court Judge and in 2008 he was elected Chair of the Labour Law Chamber.

== Biography ==
Moliner graduated in Law by the University of Valencia. He joined the judicial career by public contest in 1969 and he trained himself in the Judicial School until July 1970. During the 80s, he started to work as university professor at the National University of Distance Education, the University of Valencia and the Universidad CEU San Pablo. He has been Criminal Law, Procedural Law, Labour Law and Trade Union Law professor.

He started as judge in the courts of the cities of Mataró, Alcira and Valencia, although he also worked in the courts of Ciudad Real and Castellón. In 1990 he was promoted to the Labour Law Chamber of the High Court of Justice of the Valencian Community until 1998, when he was promoted to the Labour Law Chamber of the Supreme Court, acquiring the category of Supreme Court Magistrate.

After several years as member of the Labour Law Chamber, in 2008 he was elected Chair of the Labour Law Chamber of the Supreme Court. He served as such until July 2012, when the President of the Supreme Court and of the General Council of the Judiciary, Carlos Dívar, resigned after a public-financed trips scandal. A month after his resignation, in July, the Plenary of the General Council of the Judiciary elected Moliner as its president and, at the same time, President of the Supreme Court for the year remaining until the end of the term of the council.

Moliner has been considered a progressive magistrate and he's a member of the progressive judges association Judges for Democracy, an association from which he's founder. Previously, he was a member of Democratic Justice, a clandestine association during the dictatorship of Francisco Franco to democratize the Judiciary. In April 2013 he defended the escraches made by the Mortgage Affected Platform as an example of freedom of demonstration as long as they were not violent. In December 2013 the term of the Council ended and, the newly appointed Council, elected Carlos Lesmes to replace Moliner.

In 2014, Moliner retired because he reached the mandatory retirement age, 70 years.

Moliner is the author of numerous articles in specialized journals and several books, including the Labour appeal for supplication (1991), the Appeals in the Labour procedure of execution (1996) and Labour appeal for the unification of the doctrine (2003).

== See also ==
- General Council of the Judiciary
- Supreme Court of Spain
