= Francisco Marín Castán =

Spanish magistrate

President of the Civil Chamber
- In office 7 February 2014 – 10 November 2024
- Monarch: Felipe VI
- Preceded by: Xios Rìos

Acting President of the Supreme Court
- In office 12 October 2022 – 4 September 2024
- Preceded by: Carlos Lesmes
- Succeeded by: Isabel Perelló

Acting Vice President of the Supreme Court
- In office 25 June 2020 – 8 October 2024
- President: Carlos Lesmes (2020–2022)
- Preceded by: Jesús Gullón Rodríguez
- Succeeded by: Dimitry Berberoff Ayuda

Personal details
- Born: 10 November 1952 (age 73)
- Occupation: Magistrate

Francisco Marín Castán (born 10 November 1952 in Segovia) a Spanish retired judge who served as acting president of the Supreme Court from 2022 to 2024.

Francisco Castán was born in 1952, he started the judiciary career in 1977. He was the magistrate of the Civil Chamber of the High Court in 2000, and the Corresponding academic of the Royal Academy of Jurisprudence and Legislation in 2008.

Francisco has been professor of Procedural Law and Civil Law in the National Distance Education University Huelva working for nine years in the institute.

He was President of the Civil Chamber of the Supreme Court. He assumed the office in February 2014 after Juan Antonio Xiol Ríos. He was also acting President of the Supreme Court from October 2022 to September 2024 and acting Vice President of the Supreme Court from June 2020 to October 2024. Francisco Castán, a professor of procedural law and magistrate. He is a member of the Francisco de Vitoria Association of Judges and Magistrates which he previously served as acting president of the aforementioned Supreme Court.

Francisco was appointed by the Plenary of the General Council of the Judiciary on February 20, 2021 presided over by Carlos Lesmes, acting president of the Supreme Court.

He retired on 10 November 2024, after reaching the legal retirement age.
