= Pascual Sala =

Spanish jurist

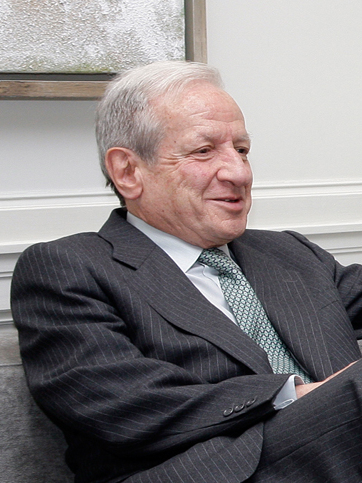
- Sala in 2011

President of the Constitutional Court
- In office 20 January 2011 – 19 June 2013
- Preceded by: María Emilia Casas
- Succeeded by: Francisco Pérez de los Cobos

President of the Supreme Court
- In office 7 November 1990 – 25 July 1996
- Preceded by: Antonio Hernández Gil
- Succeeded by: Javier Delgado Barrio

President of the General Council of the Judiciary
- In office 7 November 1990 – 25 July 1996
- Preceded by: Antonio Hernández Gil
- Succeeded by: Javier Delgado Barrio

Personal details
- Born: Pascual Sala Sánchez; June 18, 1935 (age 91) Valencia, Spain
- Occupation: Magistrate and jurist
- Awards: Order of Constitutional Merit; 1995; Order of Saint Raymond of Peñafort – Grand Cross; 1996; Order of Charles III – Grand Cross; 2014

Pascual Sala Sánchez (born 18 June 1935) is a Spanish jurist. He was president of the Supreme Court and of the General Council of the Judiciary between 1990 and 1996, and was later president of the Constitutional Court, between 2011 and 2013.

== Early life ==
Sala was born on 18 June 1935 in Valencia, and went on to study a law degree at the University of Valencia. He became a judge in 1962, and in 1970 became a magistrate of administrative disputes, presiding over courts in Valencia, Albacete and Santa Cruz de Tenerife. During the same decade, he formed part of Justicia Democrática, a movement composed of lawyers and other legal professionals in opposition to Franco's dictatorship in Spain and in favour of democracy. After the end of Franco's dictatorship, Sala became a member of the professional association Judges for Democracy until he took up his post as the President of the Supreme Court and the General Council of the Judiciary. In 1982, he became the member of the Spanish Court of Auditors representing the Congress of Deputies, as proposed by the Spanish Socialist Workers Party, and taking on the role of the President of the Prosecutions Division.

== Supreme Court and General Council of the Judiciary ==
In 1986, Sala became a magistrate of administrative disputes on the Supreme Court, and in 1988 was elected to the presidency of the Court of Auditors by its members.

On 7 November 1990, Pascual Sala became the President of the Supreme Court and the General Council of the Judiciary, with a vote of 13 in favour to 4 against of an electorate of 20 of the members of the General Council.

As president of the General Council of the Judiciary, Sala played a crucial role in the reaction to the scandal surrounding Luis Pascual Estevill, and requested Estevill resign after he was implicated in a number of offences.

On 25 July 1996, Sala left the presidencies of the Supreme Court and the General Council of the Judiciary, and returned to his previous position as a Supreme Court judge. He was replaced in the presidency by Judge Javier Delgado Barrio.

== Constitutional Court ==
From 2004 to 2013 Sala was a member of the Constitutional Court of Spain, and on 20 January 2011 he was elected its president. Sala was the first career judge ever to have been president of the Constitutional Court, with all the others having been professors. He remained in this post until 19 June 2013, when he was replaced by Francisco Pérez de los Cobos.

Notable and controversial cases his presidency of the court covered include the legalising of the Basque political party Sortu, which passed by one vote, and in whose case El País attributed the speed of the decision to Sala's effort; the case considering the constitutionality of same-sex marriage in Spain; and the beginning of the case regarding the declaration of sovereignty made by the Parliament of Catalonia (not to be confused with the Catalan declaration of independence of October 2017).

In a 2013 interview with Escritura Pública, a Spanish magazine related to law and the legal profession, Sala spoke of his concern about the politicisation of the court, saying that "the necessary institutional respect has sometimes become unknown to politicians who criticise decisions they do not approve of that the Court takes, confounding legitimate criticism with discreting, and even sometimes with insult".

== Politics ==
In an interview with RAC 1 in late 2018, speaking about the Catalan declaration of independence, Sala said "for me, it's very difficult - almost impossible - that there might exist a crime of rebellion, and very problematic, not to say also impossible, that there might exist one of sedition".

== Awards ==
On 1 December 1995, Sala was awarded the Order of Constitutional Merit by the Council of Ministers.

The next year, on 13 September 1996, he was awarded the Grand Cross of the Order of Saint Raymond of Peñafort.

On 5 December 2014, he was awarded the Grand Cross of the Order of Charles III.

== Published works ==
- Derecho de la edificación (Building law, 2001; ISBN 84-7676-784-6)
- Derecho procesal administrativo (Procedural administrative law, 2001; ISBN 84-8004-464-0)
- Jurisdicción y competencia en el proceso contencioso-administrativo: problemas de delimitación competencial en la nueva Ley Reguladora de la Jurisdicción Contencioso-administrativa (Jurisdiction and competency in the administrative judicial process: problems of definition of competencies in the new Law on Regulation of the Administrative Judicial Jurisdiction, 2002; ISBN 84-7676-816-8)
