= Ramón Posada y Soto =

Spanish jurist, writer and academic

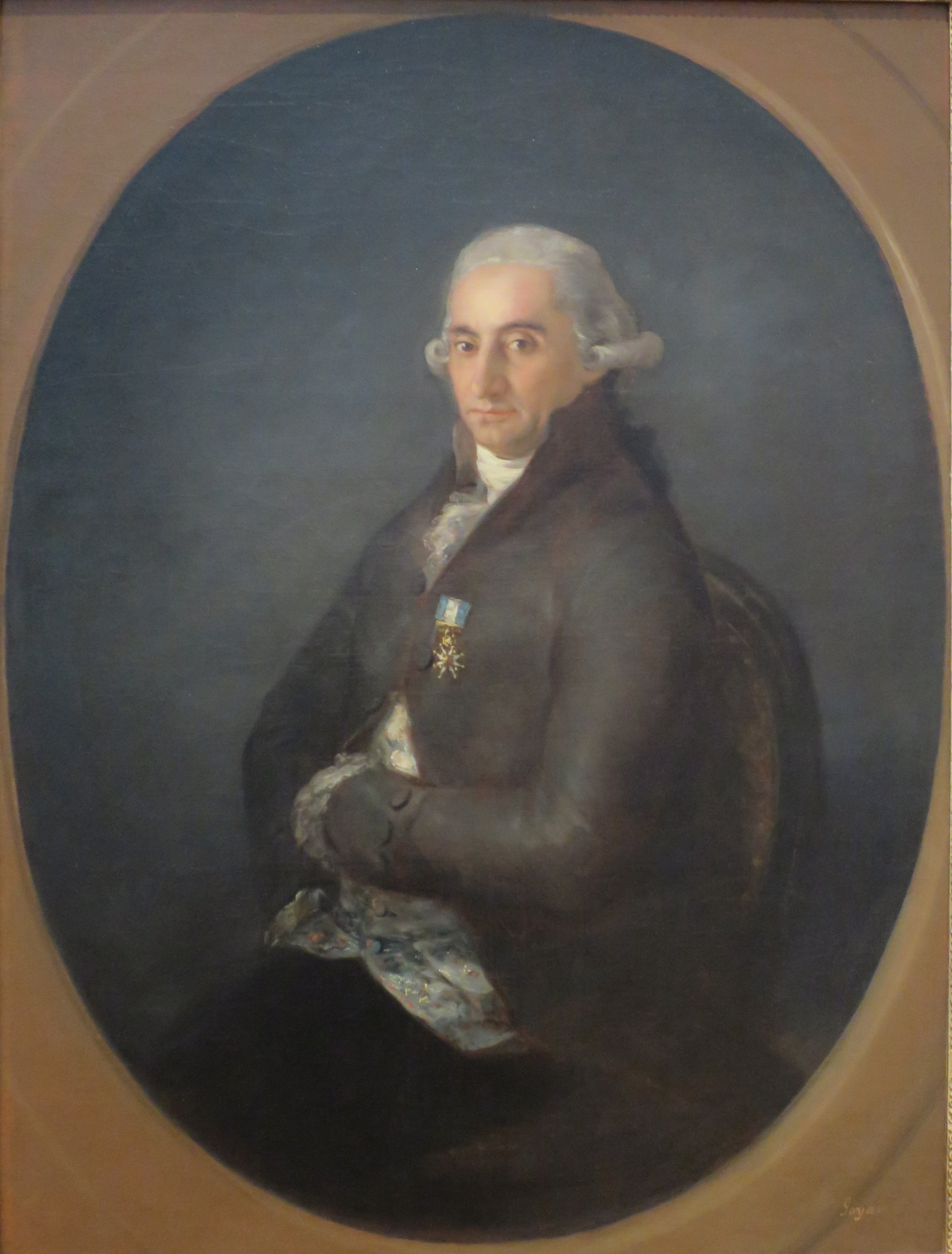

1st President of the Supreme Court
- In office 1812–1814
- Preceded by: Office established
- Succeeded by: Office abolished until 1820 (Antonio Cano Manuel y Ramírez de Arellano (1820-1823))

Personal details
- Born: Ramón de Posada y Soto; January 3, 1746; Cangas de Onís, Spain
- Died: January 1815 (aged 69); Toledo, Spain
- Spouse(s): Ana Fernández de Córdoba (1778–1779); María Magdalena López de Cabrejas y Gómez
- Children: 8
- Education: University of Valladolid; University of Ávila; University of Santa Catalina

Ramón Posada y Soto (January 3, 1746 – January 1815) was a Spanish jurist, writer and academic who served as the first president of the Supreme Court from 1812 to 1814.

== Biography ==
Posada y Soto was son of Joaquín de Posada y Rivero and Josefa de Soto y Posada, both members of important Asturian noble families.

After graduating in the three-years preparatory grade on Philosophy in the Benedictine Convent of San Salvador in Celorio he started his studies on Canons and Laws in the University of Valladolid in 1762. He also graduated in Civil Law by the University of Santa Catalina and in Civil and Canon Law by the University of Ávila (1766). In 1767 he graduated in Civil Law by the University of Valladolid.

After failing the public contest to become a professor, he completed its legal education by practising in the Gimnasio Carolino de Leyes y Cánones of Valladolid as well as in different law firms of important lawyers of the time. He also served as secretary of the University of Valladolid

He moved to Madrid and was appointed lawyer of the Royal Councils of the Council of Castile on February 16, 1773. Still in his youth, he managed to become a member of the San Fernando Royal Academy of Fine Arts in 1774. The professional course towards the legal profession was abandoned in 1774 after being appointed by King Charles III judge (oidor) of the Real Audiencia of Guatemala. In Guatemala, he also participated in governing functions as member of some courts and boards specialized in good of deads, police, tobacco, Jesuits, among others. On June 6, 1779 he was appointed Alcalde del Crimen ("Crime Mayor", a specialized judge in criminal law) in the Real Audiencia of Lima, although he could not assume the office because he was appointed prosecutor of the Real Audiencia of Mexico. At the same time, he served as Protector-General of the Native People (Protector General de los Indios). In 1785 he was ordered knight of the Order of Charles III,

Posada married in Guatemala with Ana Fernández de Córdoba in 1778. Ana was the niece of Ana de Zayas, wife of Matías de Gálvez, Viceroy of Mexico. They had five six children. His wife died in 1799 and he married again with María Magdalena López de Cabrejas y Gómez, with whom he had two daughters.

After requesting it several times, he was appointed prosecutor in the Council of the Indies in 1793 and it was during this time when Francisco de Goya made a portrait of him. In 1796 he was part of the committee that studied a project of direct trade between China and India of the Royal Company of the Philippines (a state-protected enterprise) and because of this he established a close relationship with the company, being appointed Vice President of it. He left the office of prosecutor in the Council of the Indies in 1803.

During the Peninsular War, King Joseph I appointed him member of the Council of State in 1808, although he resigned and sided with the national side (supporters of King Ferdinand VII). That year, in Cádiz, the Supreme Junta of the Kingdom appointed him as member of the new Extraordinary and Temporary Surveillance and Protection Court to investigate and prosecute the actions of the French side.

In 1810 the Council of the Indies was reestablished and he was appointed member of it. With the approval of the Constitution of 1812, in the top of judiciary was established the Supreme Court and he was one of the twenty members appointed as judges. He was elected President of the Supreme Court and on June 20, 1812, he made the inaugural speech of the court.

After the revocation of the Constitution by the king in 1814, he rejected to return to its position in the Council of the Indies and he died a year later.
