= Javier Delgado Barrio =

Spanish judge (1932–2026)

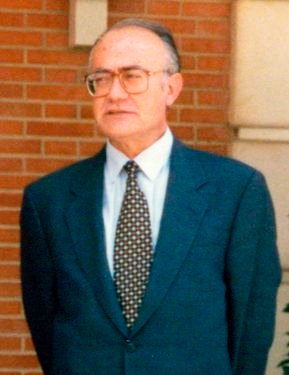
- Delgado Barrio in 1996

President of the Supreme Court
- In office 26 July 1996 – 7 November 2001
- Preceded by: Pascual Sala
- Succeeded by: Francisco José Hernando

President of the General Council of the Judiciary
- In office 26 July 1996 – 7 November 2001
- Preceded by: Pascual Sala
- Succeeded by: Francisco José Hernando

Magistrate of the Constitutional Court
- In office 2001–2012

Personal details
- Born: 21 October 1932 Barbastro, Spain
- Died: 25 September 2026 (aged 93) Madrid, Spain
- Occupation: Judge

Javier Delgado Barrio (21 October 1932 – 25 September 2026) was a Spanish judge. He served as president of the Supreme Court of Spain and the General Council of the Judiciary from 1996 to 2001, and was later a magistrate of the Constitutional Court of Spain from 2001 to 2012.

Delgado Barrio died in Madrid on 25 September 2026, at the age of 93.
