= Isabel Perelló =

Spanish judge (b. 1958)

The Most Excellent Isabel Perelló
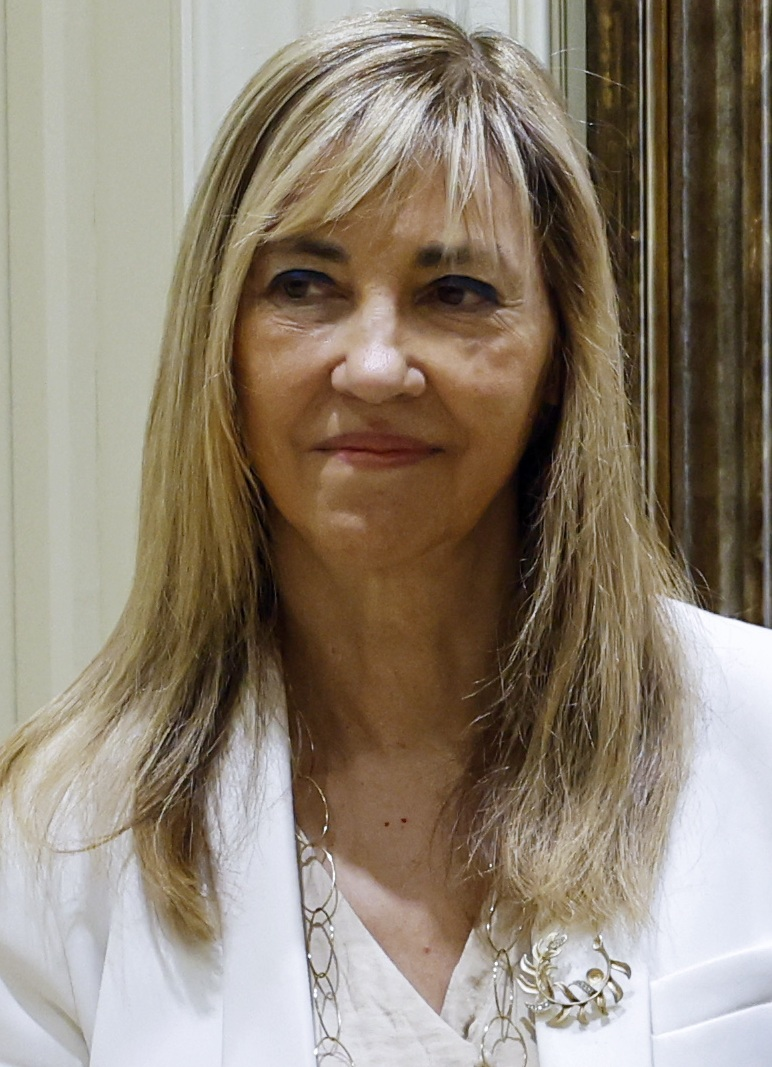
- Isabel Perelló in 2024

President of the Supreme Court and the General Council of the Judiciary
- Incumbent
- Assumed office 4 September 2024
- Preceded by: Francisco Marín Castán (as president of the Supreme Court); Vicente Guilarte Gutiérrez (as president of the CGPJ)

Personal details
- Born: María Isabel Perelló Doménech; 18 March 1958 (age 68) Sabadell, Spain
- Education: University of Santiago de Compostela; Complutense University of Madrid
- Occupation: judge

María Isabel Perelló Doménech (born 18 March 1958) is a Spanish judge serving as president of the Supreme Court and of the General Council of the Judiciary since 2024. She has been described as a progressive judge.

== Biography ==
Born in Sabadell on 18 March 1958, and raised in La Coruña, Isabel Perelló began her judicial career in 1985 and held posts in the Court of First Instance and Instruction of Mahón (Menorca), in the Provincial Court of Barcelona and in the High Court of Justice of Catalonia. A specialist magistrate in contentious-administrative matters, she served in the Contentious-Administrative Chamber of the High Court of Justice of Andalusia, Ceuta and Melilla (1991–1992) and in that of the National Court (1993–1994). In 1993, she joined the Constitutional Court as a lawyer, a position she held until 2003.

In 2009, she was promoted to the rank of magistrate of the Supreme Court and she was assigned to its Administrative Chamber. In this position, she specialised in economic regulation, supervising the activity of regulatory bodies such as the National Commission for Markets and Competition and the Bank of Spain.

In 2022, she was a candidate for magistrate of the Constitutional Court. In 2024, she was elected as president of the Supreme Court and of the General Council of the Judiciary, becoming the first woman to hold this position. She was presented as a consensus candidate, obtaining the support of 16 of the 20 members of the Council.

She is a member of the association Judges for Democracy.

== Literature ==
- La Europa de los derechos: el Convenio Europeo de Derechos Humanos. Madrid: Centro de Estudios Políticos y Constitucionales, 2005. ISBN 978-84-259-1299-3
