= Carlos Lesmes =

Spanish magistrate and prosecutor

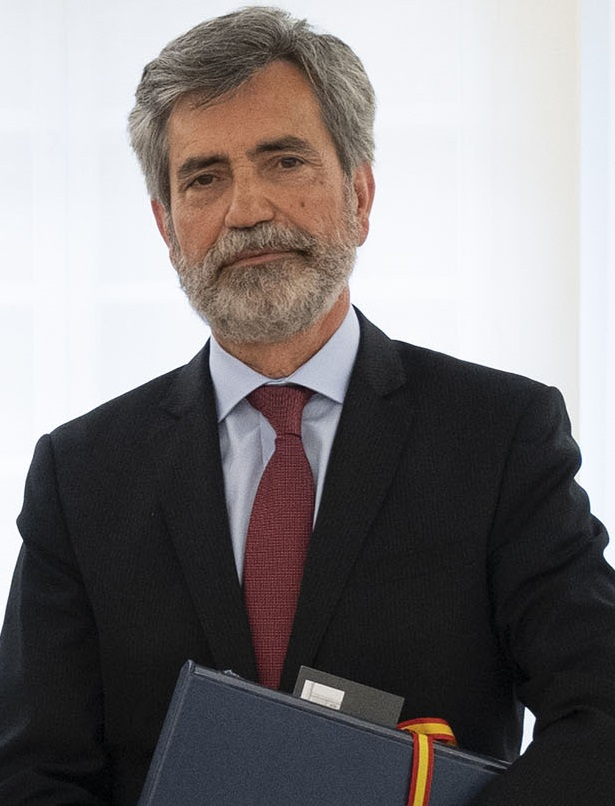
- Lesmes in April 2022

President of the Supreme Court and the General Council of the Judiciary
- In office 11 December 2013 – 12 October 2022
- Monarchs: Juan Carlos I (2013–14); Felipe VI (2014–2022)
- Preceded by: Gonzalo Moliner
- Succeeded by: Francisco Marín Castán (Supreme Court); Rafael Mozo Muelas (CGPJ)

Personal details
- Born: Carlos Lesmes Serrano; 10 June 1958 (age 66); Madrid, Spain

Carlos Lesmes Serrano (born 10 June 1958) is a Spanish magistrate and prosecutor who served as president of the Supreme Court and president of the General Council of the Judiciary (CGPJ) from 2013 to 2022. Since December 2018, he served in acting capacity in both posts, as his mandate expired at the time and the renovation of the CGPJ was blocked from then on. He is seen as a Conservative jurist with a religious background.

== Judicial career ==
Lesmes was born in Madrid, Spain in 1958. After graduating in Law, Lesmes entered by open tendering in the judicial and prosecution careers in 1984, and he chose to start his career as a prosecutor until 1993 when he entered the judicial career. As a prosecutor, he was assigned to the Provincial Courts of Alicante (1984–1985) and Madrid (1985–1992) and to the Constitutional Court (1992–1993).

In 1993 he returned to the Judicial Career, after overcoming the open tendering to specialist magistrate of the jurisdictional contentious-administrative order. Between 1993 and 1996 he was a magistrate in the Contentious-Administrative Chamber of the High Court of Justice of the Valencian Community.

Between 1996 and 2004, he temporarily suspended its functions as judge within the judicial career switching to politics during the governments of José María Aznar, serving as Director-General for Conscientious Objection (1996–2000) and Director-General for Relations with the Administration of Justice (2000–2004), both roles within the Ministry of Justice.

Lesmes returned in 2005 to his position in the Eighth Section of the Contentious-Administrative Chamber of the National Court. That year he was appointed Chairman of the Chamber, a position he held until 2010. He was also Acting President of the National Court from September 2008 to April 2009.

In March 2010, he obtained a place in the Third Chamber (Contentious-Administrative) of the Supreme Court. In 2012, Lesmes was a member of the Commission appointed by the Ministry of Justice to advise on the preparation of the proposed reform of the Judiciary Organic Act and the Judicial Organization Act.

On 9 December 2013, he was elected by the Plenary of the General Council of the Judiciary as its 8th President and 48th President of the Supreme Court.

After requesting a report from the Technical Office of the Supreme Court at the end of September to establish what his succession would be like in the event of his resignation, on 9 October 2022 he announced his intention to resign. He presented his formal resignation to the king on October 10 and was official on October 12.

He is in possession of the Grand Cross of the Order of St. Raymond of Peñafort and the gold medal awarded by the Spanish Pro-Human Rights League for his work in favor of conscientious objection.

== See also ==
- General Council of the Judiciary
- Supreme Court of Spain
