= General Council of the Judiciary =

Governing body of the Judiciary of Spain

- Established: October 23, 1980; 46 years ago
- Location: Madrid
- Composition method: Members elected by the Congress and the Senate and appointed by the King.
- Authorised by: Spanish Constitution
- Judge term length: 5 years
- Number of positions: 21
- Annual budget: € 78.33 million (2025)
- Website: www.poderjudicial.es

President of the Supreme Court and the GCJ
- Currently: Isabel Perelló
- Since: 4 September 2024

The General Council of the Judiciary (Spanish: Consejo General del Poder Judicial, CGPJ) is the national council of the judiciary of Spain. It is the constitutional body that governs all the Judiciary of Spain, such as courts, and judges, as it is established by the Spanish Constitution of 1978, article 122 and developed by the Organic Law 6/1985 of the Judicial Power (LOPJ). The president of the Supreme Court serves as ex officio president of the General Council.

== Constitutional nature ==
The Constitution of 1978 regulates the General Council of the Judiciary in paragraphs 2 and 3 of the section 122.

2. The General Council of the Judicial Power is its governing body. An organic act shall lay down its status and the system of incompatibilities applicable to its members and their functions, especially in connection with appointments, promotions, inspection and the disciplinary system.

3. The General Council of the Judicial Power shall consist of the President of the Supreme Court, who shall preside it, and of twenty members appointed by the King for a five-year period, of which twelve shall be judges and magistrates of all judicial categories, under the terms provided for by the organic act; four nominated by the Congress and four by the Senate, elected in both cases by three-fifths of their members amongst lawyers and other jurists of acknowledged competence with more than fifteen years of professional practice.

This means that, the Constitution only detail the way of election of the eight members of the CGPJ that they will be chosen between the most renowned jurists. It requires a minimum of 15 years of experience. Four of them must to be chosen by the Congress and the other four by the Senate. Both case requires a majority of three fifths of the members of every Chamber to be elected member of the CGPJ.

Otherwise, for the election of the twelve members precedents of the judiciary, with independence of the professional category that they belong (Magistrate of the Supreme Court, Magistrate or Judge), the Constitution refers to what is established in a future Organic Law. The Cortes fulfilled this constitutional mandate with the approval of the Organic Law 6/1985, of 1 July, of the Judicial Power.

== Functions ==
The CGPJ is not a jurisdictional body, but an overseeing and organising body of the Spanish Judiciary - it does not form part of the judiciary itself. Among its main functions are:

- To elect, among its members, its president and the president of the Supreme Court
- To nominate, by a three fifths majority two justices of the Constitutional Court
- To oversee and inspect the activities of judges and courts.
- To select, train, assign destination, administrative situations and establish and keep the disciplinary rules and procedures of judges and magistrates.
- To name judges and, with the approval of the Minister of Justice, the Magistrates of the Supreme Court, Court presidents and magistrates.

The CGPJ is also compelled to report on all the laws and legal dispositions of the State and the Autonomous Communities pertaining to judicial questions, as well as being consulted in the naming of the Attorney General of the State.

== Composition and manner of election ==
The Constitution determines in its article 122.3:

- It will have 20 members and a president.
- The President of the CGPJ it is also the president of the Supreme Court.
- 12 members will be judges or magistrates. An organic law will decide the method of election.
- 8 members will be lawyers or jurists. 4 of them elected by the Congress and 4 by the Senate.

The Organic Law 2/2001 (currently in force), modified the Organic Law 6/1985 in which refers to the election system:

Of the 12 members who must be Judges or Magistrates, 6 are elected by Congress and 6 by the Senate, from a list of 36 candidates proposed by associations of judges or by non-associate judges.

== Changes in the Organic Law and new reform proposal ==
=== According to the original wording of Article 112 of the Organic Law 6/1985, of July 1st, of the Judiciary ===
Each of the chambers that form the Cortes Generales chose ten members by a qualified majority of three fifths. Six among active duty judges and four among lawyers of recognized competence. Members of the outgoing Council or those who provided services in their technical bodies could not be elected.

The President is appointed by the Plenary of the CGPJ between members of the judicial career or jurists of recognized competence. During his term, members can not be removed, replaced, or terminated and can not be re-elected. Formally, they are appointed by the King of Spain.

=== According to the modification made by Organic Law 2/2001 of June 21st ===
Organic Law 2/2001, of June 21, modified article 122 of the Organic Law of the Judiciary reforming the election method between members coming from the judiciary. The professional associations of the judiciary or groups of judges who make up at least 2% of the total on active duty may present to the chambers a total of thirty-six candidates, of which the Congress shall elect six and the other six will be chosen by the Senate from among the remaining thirty.

=== Reform proposal of 2012 ===
Alberto Ruiz-Gallardón, minister of Justice, announced in 2012 his intention to change the method of election of the 12 members of the CGPJ, returning to the old system of 1985. However, on December 21, 2012, the minister attended to the Council of Ministers with a preliminary project in which it was established that the election of the twenty members of the governing body of the judges was carried out directly by the Parliament, without previous elections in the judicial career. Ruiz-Gallardón considered that the reform, consensual with the PSOE, would contribute to depoliticization justice. The Council of Ministers rejected this project.

== Members of the CGPJ ==
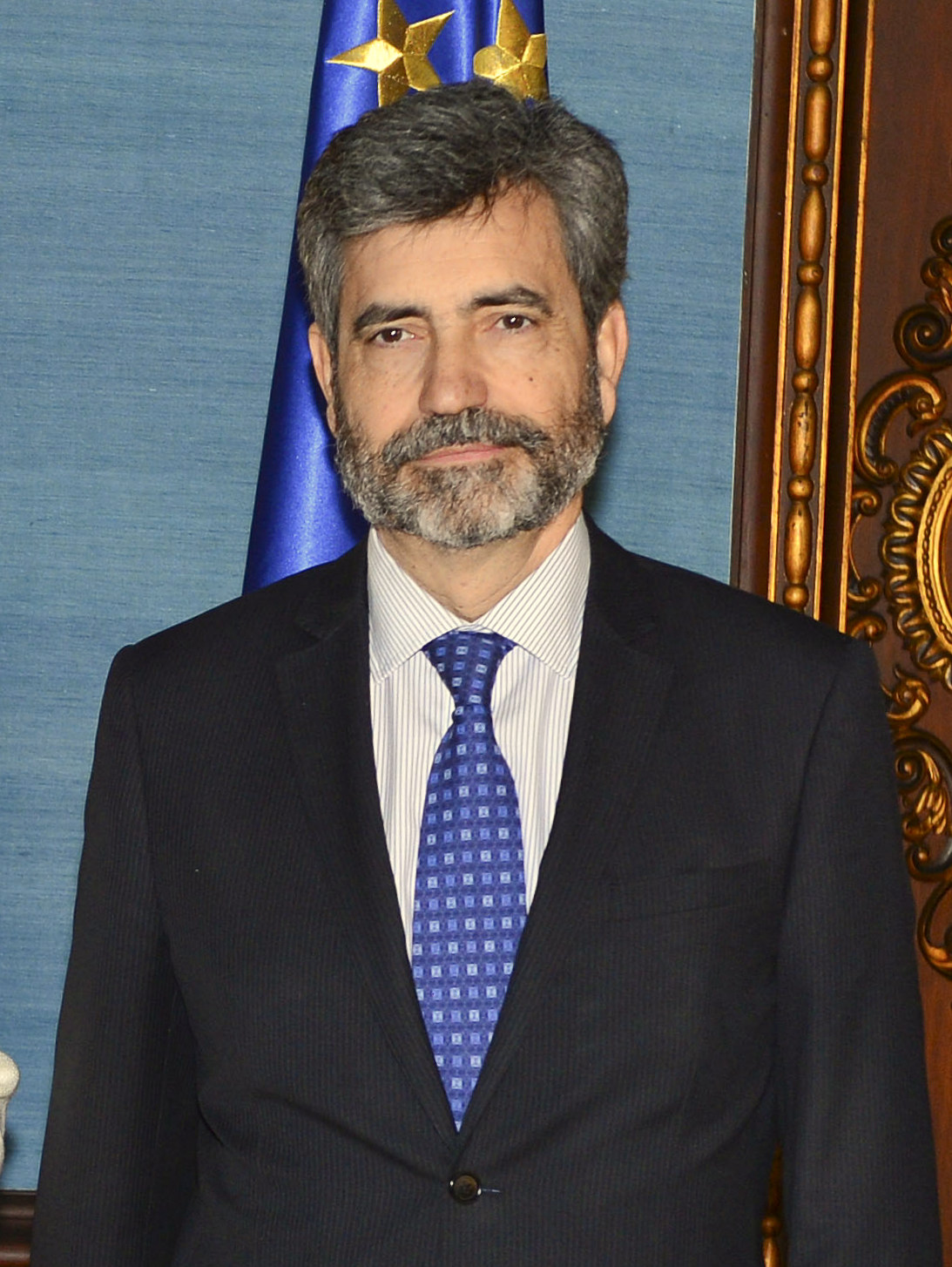
Carlos Lesmes, former president of the Supreme Court and the General Council of the Judiciary

The members of the General Council of the Judiciary are the President, the Vice-president and the Members.

== Presidents ==
The President of the CGPJ is also the president of the Supreme Court. They are:

- Federico Carlos Sainz de Robles y Rodríguez (1980–1985)
- Antonio Hernández Gil (1985–1990)
- Pascual Sala Sánchez (1990–1996)
- Francisco Javier Delgado Barrio (1996–2001)
- Francisco José Hernando Santiago (2001–2008)
- Carlos Dívar Blanco (2008–2012)
- Gonzalo Moliner Tamborero (2012–2013)
- Carlos Lesmes Serrano (2013–2022)
- Francisco Marín Castán (2022–2022). Acting.
- Isabel Perelló (2024–present)

== Vicepresidents ==
- Rafael Gimeno Gamarra, replaced by Manuel García Miguel (1980–1985)
- Manuel Peris Gómez (1985–1990)
- Luis López Guerra (1996–2001)
- Fernando Salinas Molina (2001–2008)
- Fernando de Rosa Torner (2008–2013)

In 2013, the position was replaced by that of Vice President of the Supreme Court, which is not part of the CGPJ.

== Members ==
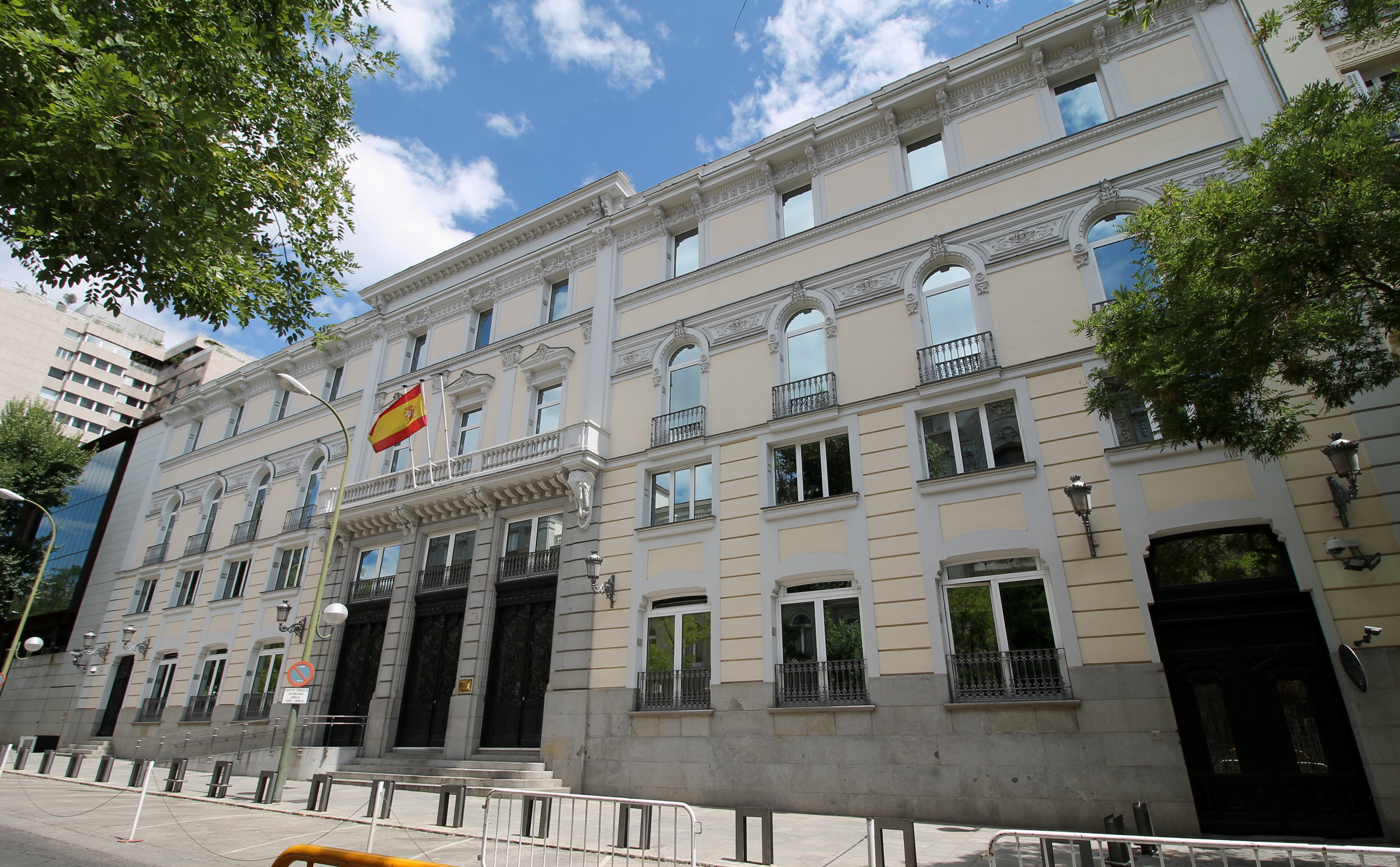
Headquarters of the CGPJ in Madrid.

These are the current Members of the CGPJ since November 29, 2013. They were elected by the Congress and the Senate. Since 2018, a third need to be renewed. The members with expired terms refuse to step down. The Spanish parliament has not mustered the 3/5 majority required to appoint new members of the CGPJ.

- Roser Bach i Fabregó
- María del Mar Cabrejas Guijarro
- María Ángeles Carmona Vergara
- María Victoria Cinto Lapuente
- Álvaro Cuesta Martínez
- Nuria Díaz Abad
- Juan Manuel Fernández Martínez
- Rafael Fernández Valverde
- Fernando Grande-Marlaska Gómez
- Vicente Guilarte Gutiérrez
- Carmen Llombart Pérez
- Clara Martínez de Careaga
- Juan Martínez Moya
- Francisco Gerardo Martínez Tristán
- Rafael Mozo Muelas
- Enrique Lucas Murillo de la Cueva
- Wenceslao Francisco Olea Godoy
- Maria Mercè Pigem i Palmés
- María Concepción Sáez Rodríguez
- María Pilar Sepúlveda García de la Torre

== See also ==
- Constitutional Court of Spain
- Royal Decree
- Spanish Courts for Violence against Women
- Spanish Judiciary
- Supreme Court of Spain
