= Carlos Dívar =

Spanish magistrate

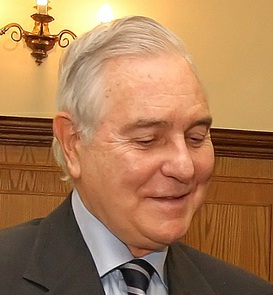
Carlos Dívar

José Carlos Dívar Blanco (Málaga, December 31, 1941 – Madrid, November 11, 2017) was a Spanish magistrate. He served as the 46th President of the Supreme Court and 6th President of the General Council of the Judiciary from September 2008 to June 2012.

Previously, he had been President of the National Court (2001-2008), he being the only judge in Spain to have been President of the Audiencia Nacional and the Supreme Court. He resigned in June 2012 when it was uncovered a scandal of alleged misappropriation of public funds as a result of a series of trips he made to Marbella for several weekends that were not justified and paid with public money. The Prosecutor's Office of the Supreme Court did not consider his actions criminal, but his reputation was very affected and public opinion forced him to resign.
