= President of the Supreme Court (Spain) =

President of the Supreme Court and the General Council of the Judiciary
- Coat of Arms of the General Council of the Judiciary

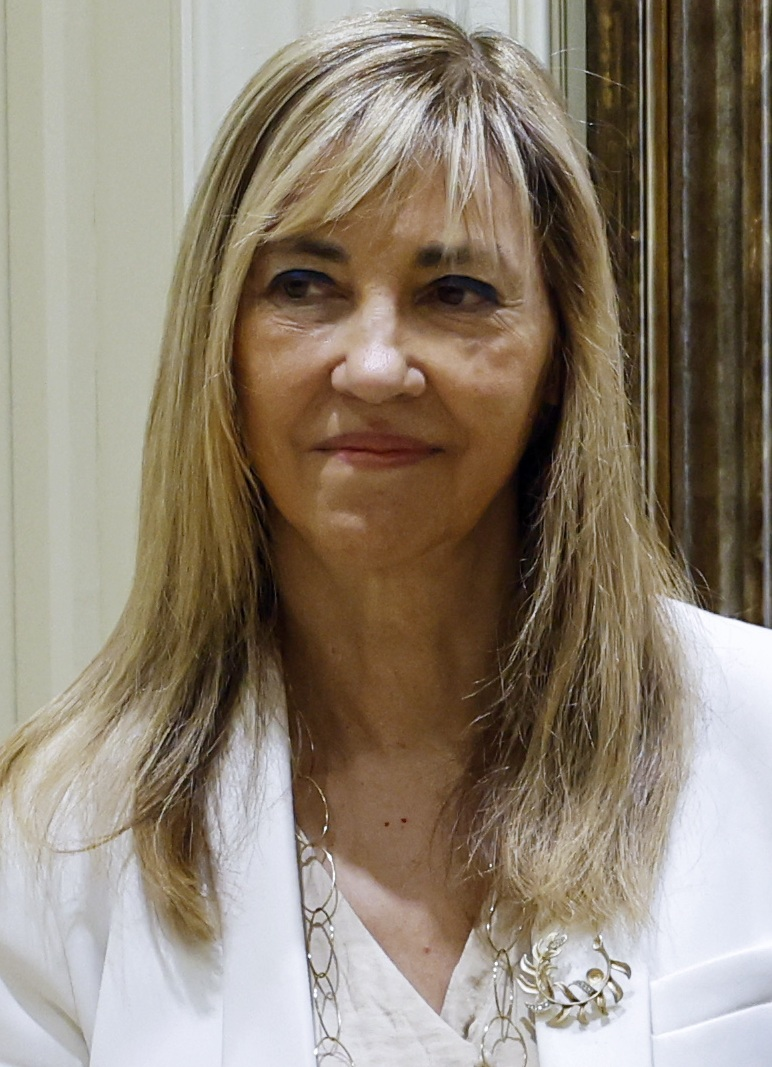
- Incumbent; Isabel Perelló since 4 September 2024
- General Council of the Judiciary; Supreme Court of Spain
- Style: The Most Excellent
- Member of: Supreme Court of Spain; General Council of the Judiciary
- Seat: Salesas Reales Convent, Madrid
- Nominator: General Council of the Judiciary
- Appointer: Monarch
- Term length: 5 years, renewable once
- Constituting instrument: Constitution of 1812
- Formation: 1812; 214 years ago
- First holder: Ramón Posada y Soto
- Unofficial names: Chief of the Judiciary
- Deputy: Vice President
- Salary: €151,186 per year
- Website: poderjudicial.es

The President of the Supreme Court, and also President of the General Council of the Judiciary, is the highest judicial authority of the Kingdom of Spain and holds the representation of the judicial branch and its governing body, the General Council of the Judiciary (CGPJ). The office of President of the Supreme Court is foreseen in the Constitution as well as giving to the president the presidency of the CGPJ. As a parliamentary monarchy, the president of the Supreme Court is appointed by the Monarch after being nominated by the Plenary of the General Council of the Judiciary, who serves until the end of its 5-years-term, its dismissal by the CGPJ or its resignation.

The President of the Supreme Court also chairs the special courts, such as the Jurisdiction Conflicts Chamber which resolve conflicts between the civil and military justice, the Jurisdiction Conflicts Court which resolve conflicts between the Courts of Justice and the Administration, the Competence Conflicts Chamber which resolve conflicts between different Courts of Justice and the Chamber for Section 61, which is in charge of major cases against the Supreme Court justices, of reviewing some sentences and of the illegalization of political parties when they promote illicit activities, do not have a democratic internal organization or there is any cause of illegality foreseen in the Criminal Code.

Since the Supreme Court was established in 1812, 48 people have served as president. The first was Ramón Posada y Soto (1812–1814). The General Council of the Judiciary was established in 1978 and held its first meeting in 1980, electing Ángel Escudero del Corral as its president.

== Functions ==
According to Article 598 of the Judiciary Organic Act, the CGPJ President is entitled:

- To represent the General Council of the Judiciary.
- To summon and chair the meetings of the Plenary and the Permanent Committee, deciding the ties with a vote of quality.
- To establish the agenda of the meetings of the Plenary and of the Permanent Committee.
- To propose to the Plenary and to the Permanent Committee any issue it deems appropriate regarding their competence.
- To propose the appointment of the judge in charge of giving judgment to Council to prepare the resolution of a matter.
- To authorize with its signature the agreements of the Plenary and of the Permanent Committee.
- To exercise the superior direction of the activities of the technical organs of the General Council of the Judiciary.
- To establish the policy of the CGPJ Press Office.
- To appoint and dismiss the Director of the Office of the President and the Director of the Press Office, as well as the eventual staff at the service of the President.
- To carry out the nomination of the Magistrate, of the Second or Third Chamber of the Supreme Court, competent to authorize of the activities of the National Intelligence Center that affect the fundamental rights recognized in Section 18.2 and 3 of the Constitution, as well as the nomination of the Magistrate of said Chambers of the Supreme Court that replaces him in case of vacancy, absence or impossibility.
- To propose to the Plenary the appointment of the Vice President of the Supreme Court, the Secretary-General and the Deputy Secretary-General, as well as, in the last two cases, agree its dismissal.
- The president may assign tasks to specific CGPJ Vowels or working groups provided that this assignment is not permanent or with no time limit.

=== Subordinations ===
From the President of the Supreme Court depends the Office or Cabinet of the Presidency, headed by a Director who is freely appointed and dismissed by the incumbent president. This office and tis director exercise the duties that the president entrusts him and directs the Services of Secretariat of Presidency, both of the Supreme Court and the General Council of the Judiciary.

Only a Magistrate of the Supreme Court or those members of the judicial career or jurists of recognized competence who meet the legal requirements to access the category of Magistrate of the Supreme Court may hold the office of Director of the Office of the Presidency.

== Election ==
According to the provisions of Section 586 of the Judiciary Organic Act, to be elected President of the Supreme Court and the General Council of the Judiciary:

«It will be necessary to be a member of the judicial career with the category of Magistrate of the Supreme Court and to meet the conditions required to be President of a Chamber of the Supreme Court, or to be a jurist of recognized competence with more than twenty-five years of seniority in the exercise of the profession»

— Section 586.1, LOPJ

The president is elected in the Plenary of the Council if he has obtained the confidence of three fifths of the members of the Plenary. If this was not the case, a second ballot would be held between the two candidates most voted in the first ballot, and the one who obtained the most support would be elected president. Once elected, the election will be communicated to the Monarch who will appoint the nominated candidate to be president. Subsequently, the appointed president will take oath before the Monarch and the Plenary of the Court.

=== Cessation ===
Pursuant to Section 588 of the Judiciary Organic Act, the President of the Supreme Court and the General Council of the Judiciary shall cease for the following reasons:

1. Due to the expiration of his term of office, which will be deemed exhausted, in any case, on the same date as the one of the Council for which he was elected.
2. By resignation.
3. By decision of the Plenum of the General Council of the Judiciary, because of notorious incapacity or serious breach of the duties of the position, appreciated by three fifths of its members.

=== Oath ===
The Oath of the President of the Supreme Court, all the judges of the Court and all the members of the judicial career is regulated in Section 318 of the Organic Act of the Judiciary.

«I faithfully swear (or promise) to obey and enforce at all times the Constitution and the rest of the legal system, with loyalty to the Crown, administer fair and impartial justice and fulfill my judicial duties before all.»

— LOPJ, Section 318

== List of presidents of the Supreme Court and the CGPJ ==
Since 1812, there have been numerous presidents of the Supreme Court, however, the General Council of the Judiciary is relatively younger. This list only includes the presidents who have been at the same time presidents of the General Council of the Judiciary:

- 41º Federico Carlos Sainz de Robles y Rodríguez (1980–1985)
- 42º Antonio Hernández Gil (1985–1990)
- 43º Pascual Sala Sánchez (1990–1996)
- 44º Francisco Javier Delgado Barrio (1996–2001)
- 45º Francisco José Hernando Santiago (2001–2008)
- 46º Carlos Dívar Blanco (2008– 2012)
- 47º Gonzalo Moliner Tamborero (2012–2013)
- 48º Carlos Lesmes Serrano (2013–2022)
- Francisco Marín Castán (2022–2024). Acting. Only president of the Supreme Court.
- 49º Isabel Perelló (2024–)

== See also ==
- Supreme Court of Spain
- General Council of the Judiciary
- President of the Constitutional Court of Spain
- Judiciary of Spain
