= Supreme Court (Spain) =

Highest court in Spain

- Tribunal Supremo
- Badge of the magistrates of the Supreme Court

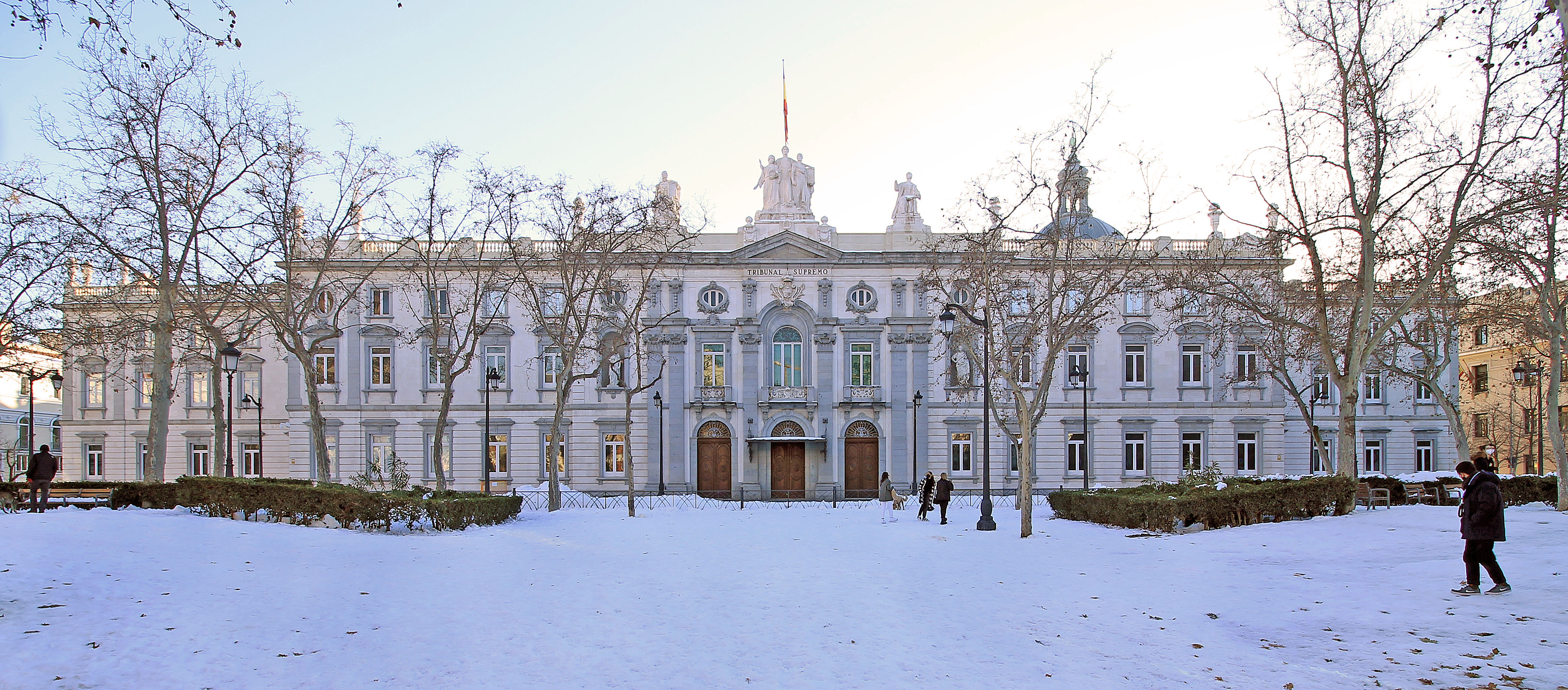
- Headquarters of the Supreme Court in Madrid
- Interactive map of Supreme Court
- Established: April 17, 1812; 214 years ago
- Location: Convent of the Salesas Reales, Madrid, Spain
- Composition method: Appointed by Monarch on selection by the General Council of the Judiciary
- Authorised by: Constitution of Spain
- Judge term length: Appointed for life until retired at 70
- Number of positions: 83 (as of 2026)
- Website: Portal del Tribunal Supremo

President of the Supreme Court
- Currently: María Isabel Perelló Doménech
- Since: 4 September 2024

Vice President of the Supreme Court
- Currently: Dimitry Berberoff Ayuda
- Since: 8 October 2024

The Supreme Court (Spanish: Tribunal Supremo, TS) is the highest court in the Kingdom of Spain. The court has original jurisdiction over cases against high-ranking officials of the Kingdom and over cases regarding the banning of political parties. It also has ultimate appellate jurisdiction over all cases. The Court also has the power of judicial review, except for constitutional matters, reserved to the Constitutional Court.

The Court was originally established pursuant to Title V of the Constitution of 1812 to replace the System of Councils in all matters that affected justice, and it is currently regulated by Title VI of the Constitution of 1978. As set in the Judiciary Organic Act of 1985, the Court consists of the President of the Supreme Court (who also chairs the General Council of the Judiciary), the Vice President, the Chairpersons of the Court's Chambers and an undetermined number of Magistrates (83 as of 2026). Each Magistrate of the Supreme Court is nominated by the General Council of the Judiciary and appointed by the Monarch for a lifetime tenure up to the age of 70, when they must retire (unless they request a 2-year extension).

The Court meets in its Palace, built by Antonio Ruiz de Salces on the site of the old Convent of the Salesas Reales in Madrid. The security of the buildings and personnel of the Supreme Court is entrusted to the Supreme Court Special Commissariat, a unit of the National Police Corps.

== Powers ==
The Supreme Court is the court of last resort and can provide finality in all legal issues. It can exercise original jurisdiction over matters of great importance but usually functions as an appellate court able to investigate procedural irregularities arising from actions in the national courts or Provincial courts. It can order ordinary and extraordinary remedies against decisions of lower courts according to the provisions of Spanish law.

The Supreme Court is responsible for processing substantial complaints of wrongdoing against prominent persons such as government Ministers, Senators, Deputies and members of the various regional parliaments, senior judges, including the President and judges of the Constitutional Court, the highest tribunal in the country regarding constitutional matters.

It also processes formal applications by the procurator (public prosecutor) to outlaw political parties,

Generally, there is no avenue of appeal against a Supreme Court decision although, in criminal matters, the Crown may exercise the prerogative of mercy to invalidate sentences imposed or ratified by the Supreme Court, constitutionally, such appeals are resolved by the Council of Ministers and then formalized by the monarch, as head of state.

Supreme Court decisions may, exceptionally, be overruled by the Constitutional Court if there has been an infringement of rights and freedoms of citizens embodied in the Spanish Constitution of 1978 – articles 14 to 29 and 30.2, regarding Fundamental Rights– or by decisions emanating from the European Court of Human Rights since Spain is a signatory to the European Convention on Human Rights.

== Constitutional Status ==
The Supreme Court is the head one of the three branches of the Spanish government, alongside the legislature and the executive

- The legislature formulates laws,
- The executive (actually the Council of Ministers led by the Prime Minister), proposes laws and regulations and enforces those actions that the legislature endorses via administrative orders which can be reinforced by police action or armed force.
- The Supreme Court and the rest of national judicial institutions provide remedies where that enforcement is found to be unjust or disproportional against the standard set by either law, as defined by the legislature or the Spanish Constitution of 1978 or the human rights provisions currently in force

To ensure its independence, the Supreme Court has the prerogative to enforce its actions under the principle of obedience to final judicial decisions enshrined in the Constitution. Also, most of its resolutions are reliable since they are solutions to appeal against the considered decisions of lower courts.

The Supreme Court is the only entity that can order the detention of members of its own judiciary or the legislature or executive authorities and then impeach them according to the additional civil and criminal obligations, which, by law, it must discharge diligently in the performance of their official duties.

Peer review is provided by the General Council of the Judiciary, a panel of senior Supreme Court judges that monitors the Supreme Court practice and operation, but the decisions of this Council are advisory and may be annulled by due process in a Supreme Court action.

== Composition ==
=== Size of the court ===
Neither the Constitution of 1812 or the current Spanish Constitution specify the number of justices. The Supreme Court of Justice Act of 1814 established a high court consisting of 16 "ministers" distributed in three chambers. This act hardly took effect due to the restoration of absolutism in 1814, although it was in force between 1820 and 1823. In 1834, it was restored with the name of Supreme Court of Spain and Indies and it was established the same composition. In 1864, the Court was divided into two chambers and the number of magistrates grows up to 25.

In 1868, it was created the Third Chamber to know the issues related to the public administrations (administrative law). In 1870 the number of magistrates grow again to 33 distributed in four chambers; one for civil cases, two for criminal cases and one for administrative cases. Between 1875 and 1904 the administrative jurisdiction was transferred to the Council of State.

In 1931, the Republic divided the Court into six chambers: First Chamber for Civil Law, Second Chamber of Criminal Law, Third and Fourth Chambers for Administrative Law, Fifth Chamber for Laboral Law and Sixth Chamber for Military Law, and the number of magistrates was up to 40. In the current democratic period, the Court is divided into five chambers and neither the Constitution or the Organic Judiciary Act specifies the number of magistrates. According to 2017 data, the Court was composed by 79 magistrates.

=== Nomination and appointment ===
The Constitution does not regulate the form of appointment of the magistrates although it does regulate the procedure of appointment of the President of the Court. According to Section 123, the President is nominated by the General Council of the Judiciary and appointed by the Monarch. The Judiciary Organic Act of 1985 copy this procedure of appointment but specifies that the Royal Decree must be countersigned by the Minister of Justice.

To be a candidate for Magistrate of the Supreme Court the law establishes two options:

- Justices from the category of Magistrate, with at least ten years in the category of Magistrate and fifteen in the judicial career.
- Legal experts of recognized prestige and with fifteen years of a legal career.

==== Military members of the Fifth Chamber ====
The Organic Law on the military jurisdiction provides that half of the members of the Fifth chamber will be selected from general officers of the Military Legal Corps. These members are appointed by the General council of the judiciary from a list proposed by the Ministry of Defence. Upon nomination to the Supreme Court, military members are retired from the armed forces and will act only on the capacity of Supreme Court Justices.

=== Tenure ===
The tenure of the Magistrates of the Supreme Court is regulated in Section 386 of the Judiciary Organic Act and it establishes a life tenure. However, the law also established that the magistrates must retire at the age of 70. However, the law allows the magistrates to ask the General Council of the Judiciary an extension of their tenure until the age of 72. The Magistrates can freely retire since the age of 65.

Outside of these cases, magistrates shall be forcedly retired when there is a permanent disability for the exercise of their functions. The forced retire can be requested by the Prosecution Ministry or the magistrate itself to the Governing Council of the Supreme Court or to the Governing Council of a specific chamber. After this, the Governing Council shall send the request to the GCJ and the Council shall approve the retire.

== Organization ==
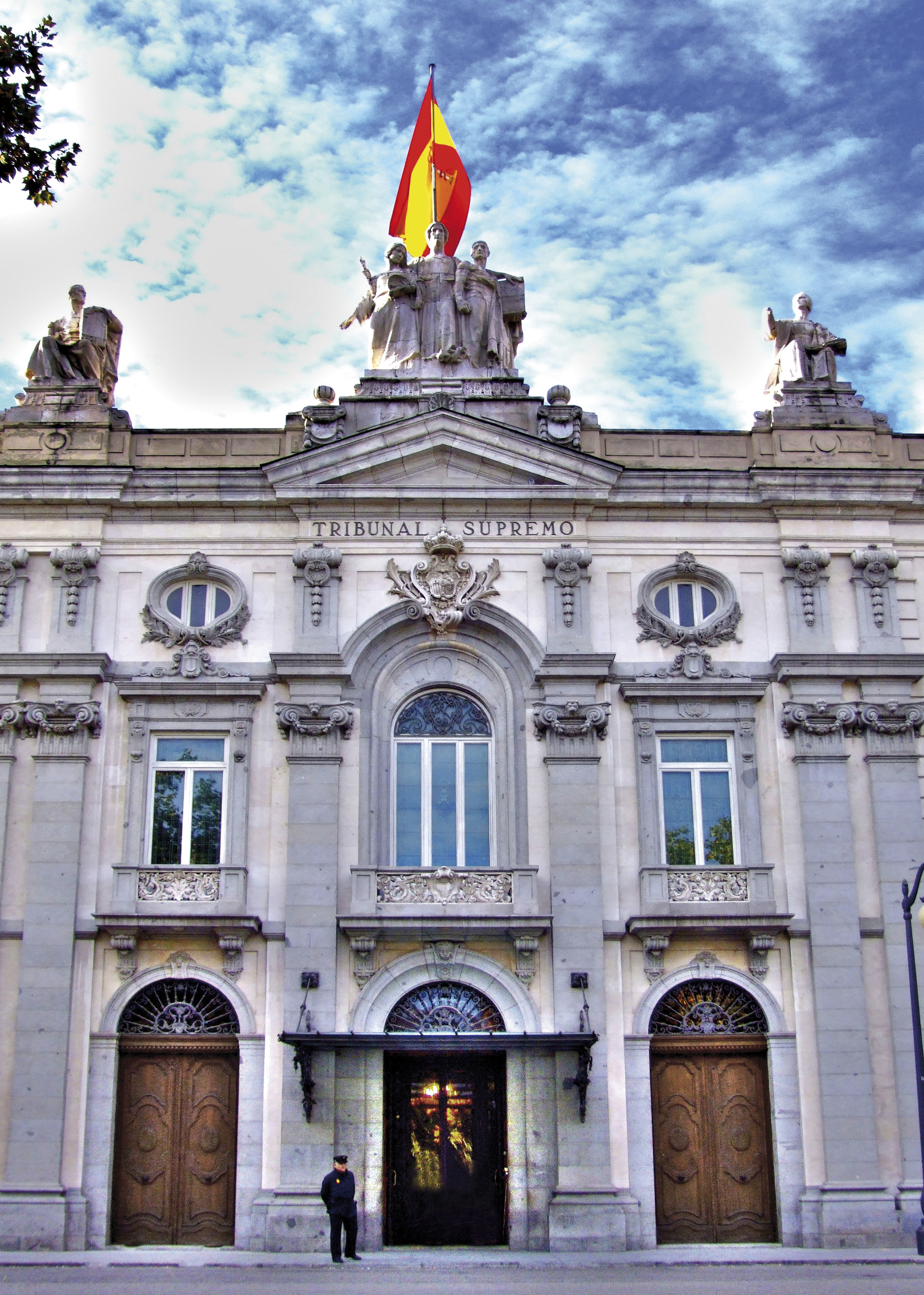
Entrance to the Court

=== Chambers ===
The Supreme Court is divided into five ordinary chambers, each dealing with a specific areas of Spanish law that may affect ordinary citizens, and four special chambers dealing with state issues. The five ordinary chambers are:

- First Chamber, for Civil Law
  - The President of the First Chamber is Francisco Marín Castán
- Second Chamber, for Criminal Law
  - The President of the Second Chamber is Manuel Marchena Gómez
- Third Chamber, for Contentious-Administrative Law
  - The President of the Third Chamber is Luis María Díez-Picazo Giménez
- Fourth Chamber, for Labour Law
  - The President of the Fourth Chamber is Jesús Gullón Rodríguez
- Fifth Chamber, for Military Law
  - The President of the Fifth Chamber is Ángel Calderón Cerezo

The four special chambers are:

- Special Chamber under Article 61 of the Organic Law on the Judiciary
  - Deals with the process of outlawing political parties, the investigation, and correction of a judicial error on reporting and accountability in the exercise of judicial functions and other legal processes of particular importance. The tribunal is composed of the Chief Justice, sitting with the serving presidents of the five Chambers, and one independent senior judge.
- Court for Conflicts of Jurisdiction
  - Resolves conflicts and deficiencies arising between the jurisdictional responsibilities of a civil court, the Courts Martial or Administrative courts. It is composed of the Chief Justice, two Judges of the Third Chamber, and three permanent directors of the Spanish Council of State.
- Chamber for Conflicts of Jurisdiction
  - Resolves conflicts and deficiencies arising between the ordinary civil courts and organs of military justice. The Chief Justice, two Judges of the Board for the relevant civil court (within the ordinary civil jurisdictional competence of Chambers 1-4) plus two judges from the military chamber (Fifth Chamber).
- Chamber for Conflicts of Competence
  - Resolves conflicts of jurisdiction arising between members of different judicial branches such as overlaps or lacunas between different courts or where claims or denials of competence by different Chambers are incompatible. The Chief Justice and one Judge drew of each of the Boards supervising jurisdictions where conflict has arisen.

=== Governing bodies ===
Subordinate to the General Council of the Judiciary, the Supreme Court's governing bodies are responsible for hearing and resolving administrative issues that may arise:

- The Office of The Chief Justice (Presidente del Tribunal Supremo).
- The Administration Division of the Supreme Court, comprising the Chief Justice, the Presidents of each of its divisions and a number of additional judges specified by the Spanish General Law of Judicial Power.

=== Management bodies ===
- The Office of Chief Justice (Presidente del Tribunal Supremo),
- The Technical Documentation and Information service
- The Department of Archives, Library, and Information
- The Department of Computer Science
- An external relations unit that maintains a General Register of external administrative and technical specialist services that may provide expert assistance.

== See also ==
- Judiciary of Spain
- President of the Supreme Court of Spain
- President of the Constitutional Court of Spain
- Constitutional Court of Spain
- Audiencia Nacional of Spain
- Regional High Courts
- Regional Courts of Justice
