= 2008 Spanish general election =

- 9 March 2008

All 350 seats in the Congress of Deputies and 208 (of 264) seats in the Senate 176 seats needed for a majority in the Congress of Deputies
- Opinion polls
- Registered: 35,073,179 ▲1.5%
- Turnout: 25,900,439 (73.8%) ▼1.9 pp
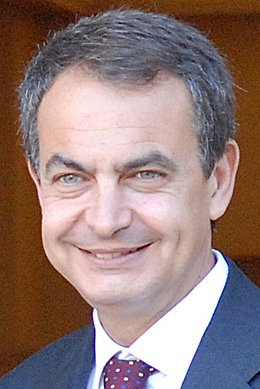

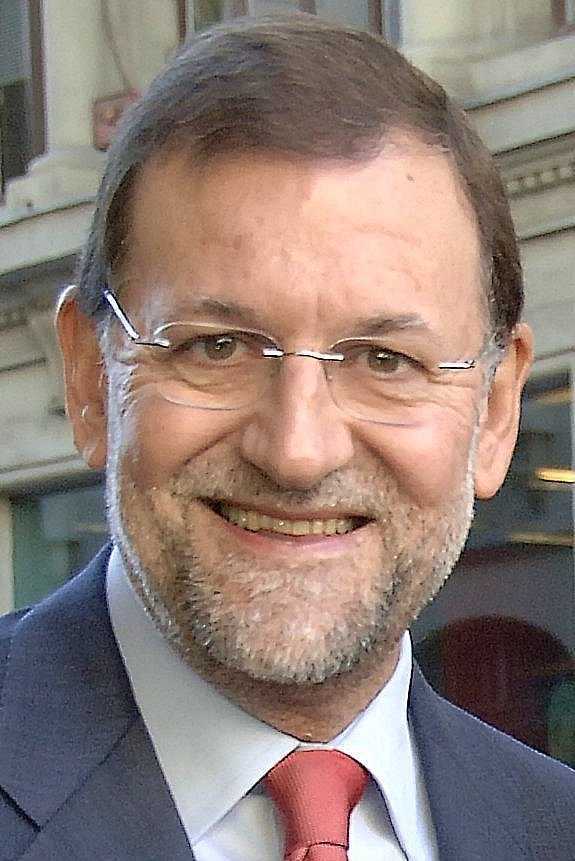

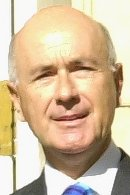

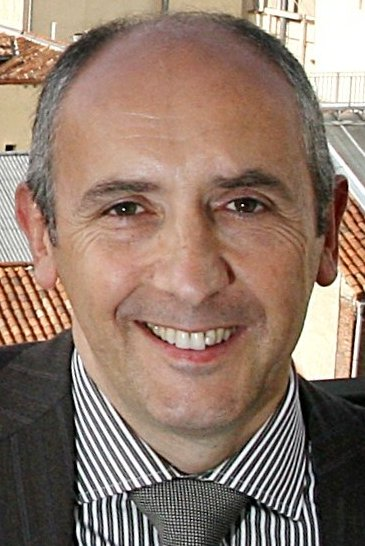

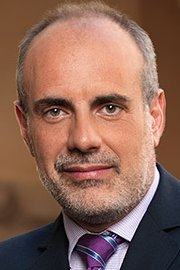

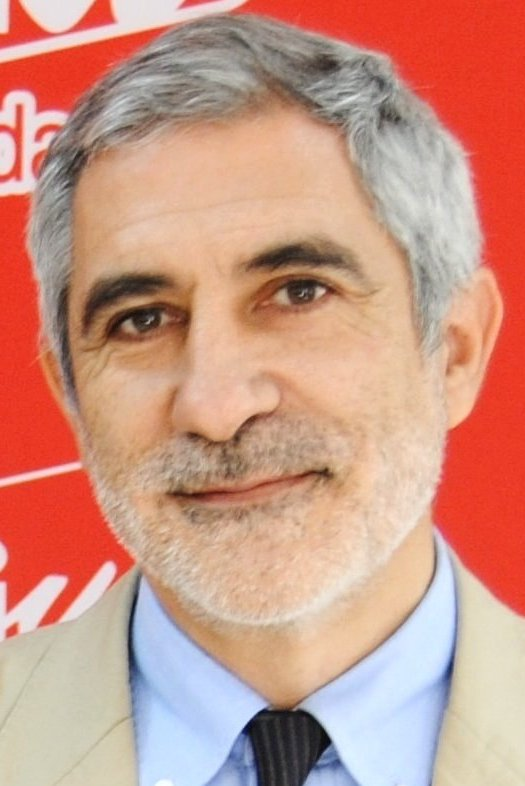
	First party	Second party	Third party
Leader	José Luis Rodríguez Zapatero	Mariano Rajoy	Josep Antoni Duran i Lleida
Party	PSOE	PP	CiU
Leader since	22 July 2000	2 September 2003	24 January 2004
Leader's seat	Madrid	Madrid	Barcelona
Last election	164 seats, 42.6%	148 seats, 37.7%	10 seats, 3.2%
Seats won	169	154	10
Seat change	▲5	▲6	0
Popular vote	11,289,335	10,278,010	779,425
Percentage	43.9%	39.9%	3.0%
Swing	▲1.3 pp	▲2.2 pp	▼0.2 pp
	Fourth party	Fifth party	Sixth party
Leader	Josu Erkoreka	Joan Ridao	Gaspar Llamazares
Party	EAJ/PNV	ERC	IU
Leader since	2004	2007	29 October 2000
Leader's seat	Biscay	Barcelona	Madrid
Last election	7 seats, 1.6%	8 seats, 2.5%	5 seats, 5.0%
Seats won	6	3	2
Seat change	▼1	▼5	▼3
Popular vote	306,128	298,139	969,946
Percentage	1.2%	1.2%	3.8%
Swing	▼0.4 pp	▼1.3 pp	▼1.2 pp
Prime Minister before election
José Luis Rodríguez Zapatero
PSOE
Prime Minister after election
José Luis Rodríguez Zapatero
PSOE

A general election was held in Spain on 9 March 2008 to elect the members of the 9th Cortes Generales under the Spanish Constitution of 1978. All 350 seats in the Congress of Deputies were up for election, as well as 208 of 264 seats in the Senate. It was held concurrently with a regional election in Andalusia.

The surprise victory of the Spanish Socialist Workers' Party (PSOE) at the 2004 election, amid the public shock caused by the 11M Madrid train bombings, had led to an increase of bipolarization in Spanish politics, with the opposition People's Party (PP) under Mariano Rajoy and right-wing media embracing conspiracy theories about the blasts' authorship and motives while engaging in a strategy of rising tension and street protests against the new government. One of the first measures adopted by Prime Minister José Luis Rodríguez Zapatero was the withdrawal of Spanish troops from Iraq, which caused a downturn in relations with the U.S. administration of George W. Bush. This period saw the implementation of same-sex marriage in Spain, fast-track divorce, measures fostering women's rights and the fight against gender-based violence, as well as the Historical Memory Law recognizing the victims of the Spanish Civil War and the Francoist dictatorship.

Zapatero's decision to engage in talks with the separatist group ETA—after three years of relative calm and a ceasefire in March 2006—was not without controversy, and the government was forced to halt all negotiations following the Madrid–Barajas Airport bombing in December that year. The PSOE government also attempted to enforce a policy of reform of the regional statutes of autonomy, with the issue of the 2006 Catalan statute being the most controversial: its curtailment in the Cortes Generales caused the downfall of regional president Pasqual Maragall's cabinet and an appeal to the Constitutional Court being filed by the PP. Although Zapatero's first term saw a continuation of the economic growth of previous years, the growing property bubble in housing prices and a multinational subprime mortgage crisis started showing symptoms of a potential real estate and financial crisis by late 2007.

The electoral outcome saw a record result for both PSOE and PP, which combined amounted for more than 83% of the vote share and 92% of Congress seats. The PSOE benefitted from tactical voting against the PP—at the cost of peripheral nationalist parties, such as Convergence and Union, Republican Left of Catalonia, the Basque Nationalist Party or Chunta Aragonesista, falling to historical lows of popular support—and emerged as the most-voted party just seven seats short of an overall majority, which allowed Zapatero to be sworn in for a second term in office in April 2008. On the other hand, Rajoy's PP saw an increase in its vote share and seat count, but remained unable to overtake the Socialists. United Left had its worst general election performance ever with less than four percent of the share and two seats, whereas the new Union, Progress and Democracy party—founded by former PSOE member and leadership contender Rosa Díez—became the first nationwide party aside from PSOE, PP and IU to secure seats since the Democratic and Social Centre was left out of parliament in 1993.

== Background ==
The 2004 general election was heavily influenced by the Madrid train bombings, seeing the unexpected ousting of the ruling People's Party (PP) amid voters' fury at the crisis' controversial management by the government (accused of a disinformation campaign to prevent the blame on the bombings being linked to the Spanish involvement in the Iraq War). José Luis Rodríguez Zapatero went on to secure investiture as prime minister of Spain with the only opposition of PP lawmakers, subsequently forming a minority government of his Spanish Socialist Workers' Party (PSOE).

Immediately after assuming power, Zapatero's first government fulfilled a campaign pledge to withdraw Spanish troops from Iraq, causing a downturn in relations with the U.S. administration under George W. Bush. Internationally, the country recovered relations with Germany and France and unblocked negotiations for the European Constitution Treaty, which in Spain was successfully submitted to a referendum in February 2005 (albeit amid a high abstention rate). Zapatero also proposed an "Alliance of Civilizations" against Islamist extremism, through increased international, intercultural and interreligious dialogue and cooperation between the Western and Muslim worlds. His government also dealt with the 2007 Morocco–Spain diplomatic conflict over King Juan Carlos I's visit to the cities of Ceuta and Melilla, as well as a diplomatic incident with Venezuela over the King's words "Why don't you shut up?" (Spanish: ¿Por qué no te callas?) directed at Hugo Chávez during the 2007 Ibero-American Summit.

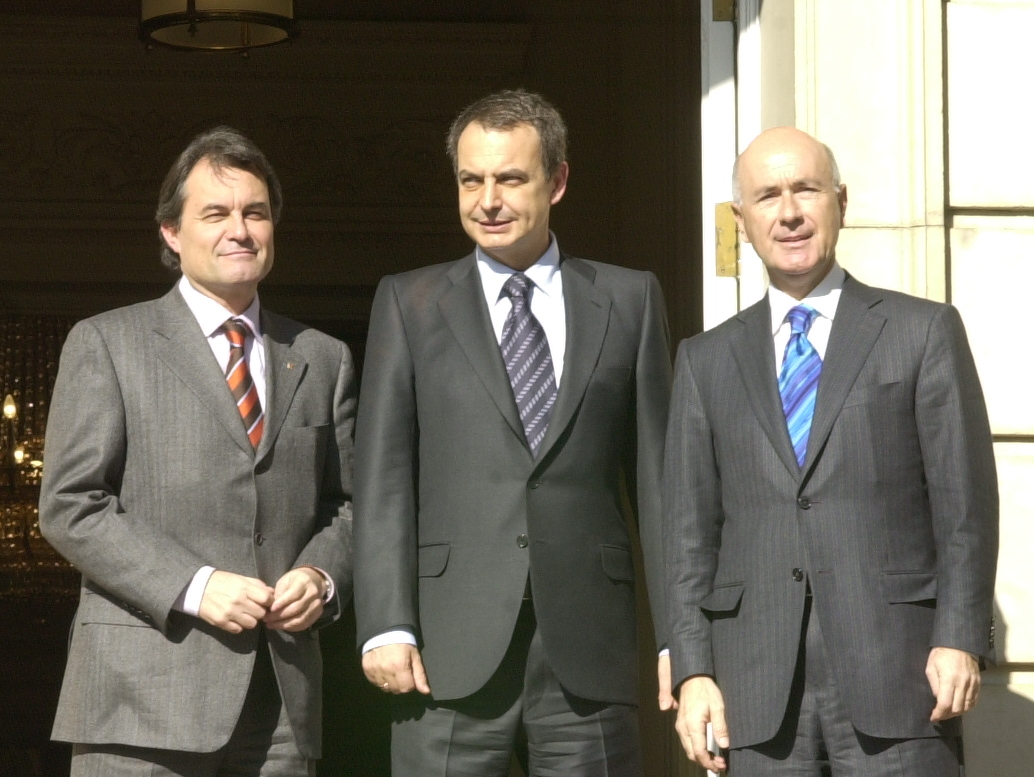
The drafting of a new Statute of Autonomy for Catalonia created tensions between the Spanish government and Catalan parties.

Domestically, Zapatero set out to adopt an ambitious agenda to expand social rights and civil liberties, including the first gender-equal cabinet, measures fostering women's rights and the fight against gender-based violence, the legalization of same-sex marriage, the recognition of long-term care, and the approval of "fast-track" divorce and the first Equality Law, This period also saw the repealing of the Ebro river water transfer, the expansion of anti-smoking bans, the introduction of a point system for driving licenses, the return of the Salamanca Papers to the Catalan government, a new Education Law (the LOE) to improve educational equity and remove compulsory religious classes, an amnesty for migrants working under the table, a €2,500 baby bonus, or a Historical Memory Law to recognize victims of the Spanish Civil War and the Francoist dictatorship. A plan for limited constitutional reform—including the removal of male-preference from the right of succession to the monarchy or a Senate's reform—failed due to a lack of consensus. Immigration remained an issue, particularly with the Cayuco boat crisis that saw over 30,000 illegal immigrants arriving at the Canary Islands by sea in 2006.

Territorial reform became a topic of contention, particularly over the 2006 Catalan Statute of Autonomy (which envisaged a vast expansion of regional powers, of dubious constitutionality). The Cortes Generales curtailed the text—following an agreement between Zapatero and Convergence and Union's leader Artur Mas, and in breach of a previous pledge by the former to uphold whatever the Catalan parliament approved—with opposition from Republican Left of Catalonia (ERC) causing the downfall of the Catalan government under Pasqual Maragall; the amended Statute was approved in referendum, albeit under a low voter turnout. A proposed Basque Statute reform to turn that region into an associated state (the Ibarretxe Plan) was rejected by the Spanish parliament in February 2005, prompting the lehendakari, Juan José Ibarretxe, to turn that year's Basque election into a plebiscite on his plan (which ultimately failed). Successful statutory reforms were approved for Andalusia, Aragon, the Balearic Islands, Castile and León and the Valencian Community, with bipartisan support.

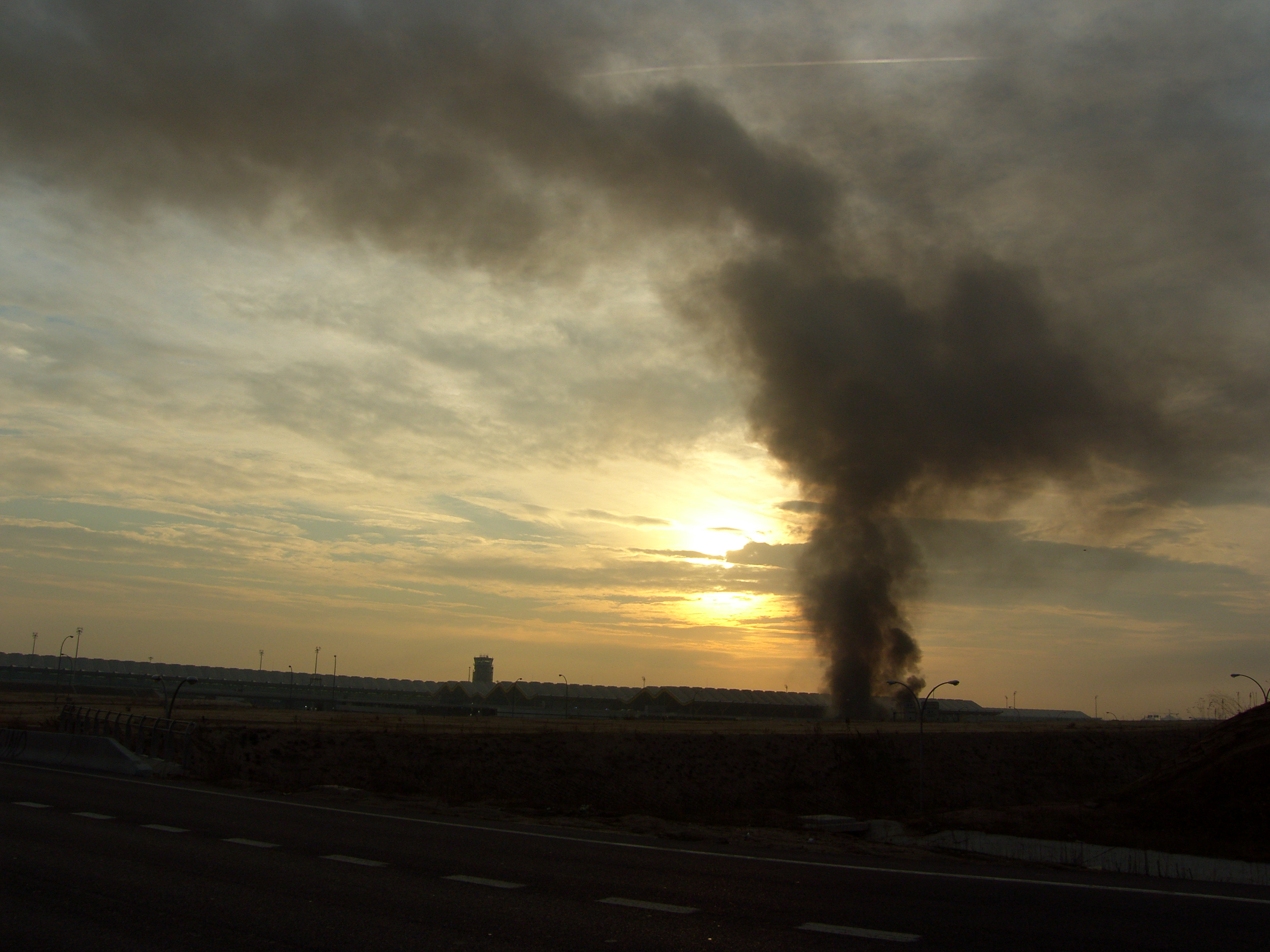
The Madrid–Barajas Airport bombing effectively ended negotiations talks ensuing from ETA's 2006 ceasefire declaration.

The weakening of ETA's activity over continuous police operations prompted the group to back calls for dialogue with Spanish authorities—put forward in late 2004 by its outlawed political-wing, Batasuna—in order to resolve the Basque conflict. Zapatero's government accepted to re-engage in peace talks with ETA, paving the way for a "permanent" ceasefire declaration on 22 March 2006, and the formal start of negotiations in June 2006. Throughout the summer and fall of 2006, the group warned about the peace process being "in crisis" due to the continued police arrests and trials against ETA members, seeing episodes such as member Iñaki de Juana Chaos's hunger strikes or an increase in kale borroka attacks. The 2006 Madrid–Barajas Airport bombing prompted the government to halt all negotiations, with ETA officially ending its ceasefire in June 2007.

The opposition PP under Mariano Rajoy—who succeeded José María Aznar as party leader in October 2004—embraced conspiracy theories about the Madrid bombings' authorship and motives (attributing them as an attempt to "rob" them the election) and, together with right-wing media, engaged in a strategy of rising tension (crispación) and street protests against Zapatero's agenda amid a growing polarization of Spanish politics. Together with the Spanish Episcopal Conference, it opposed reforms on same-sex marriage and education, while it joined the Association of Victims of Terrorism in demostrations against the government's peace talks with ETA (with Rajoy going on to accuse Zapatero of "betraying the dead"). The PP also staged a harsh campaign against the Catalan Statute by tabling a popular initiative (which gathered over four million signatures) and appealing the approved text to the Spanish Constitutional Court, accusing the government of fostering Spain's "breakup". Zapatero remained popular during his first term, seeing his party win the Galician government in the 2005 regional election, and the renewal of the tripartite cabinet (under José Montilla) in the 2006 Catalan election following the Statute crisis. The 2007 local and regional elections were highly bipolarized and globally inconclusive, with both PP and PSOE tying for first place.

The Spanish economy's expansion helped reduce unemployment to record lows since the country's transition to democracy, with the first budget surplus in over three decades, and Spain's GDP per capita briefly overtaking Italy's in 2007 (bringing it close to convergence with the European Union's average). This growth was driven by a real-estate bubble which saw a major rise in housing construction, speculation and rocketing house prices; this, in turn, prompted an increase in the cost of mortgages, and a rise in household debts. Nonetheless, the buoyancy of this period allowed the government to adopt a policy of tax cuts (particularly into lower income and corporate taxes, with more tax deductions) and coin the "cutting taxes is left-wing" slogan. In September 2007, Zapatero boasted about the positive economic figures by proclaiming that, under his government, Spain had "joined the Champions' League of world economies". The outbreak of the subprime mortgage crisis in the United States during the summer of 2007 affected Spain's construction industry and the economy, which started showing signs of slowdown. The squeeze in international credit and looming economic uncertainty switched the political focus during the months previous to the 2008 election, amid a spike in the inflation rate and a rise in unemployment.

== Overview ==
Under the 1978 Constitution, the Spanish Cortes Generales were conceived as an imperfect bicameral system. The Congress of Deputies held greater legislative power than the Senate, having the ability to grant or withdraw confidence from a prime minister and to override Senate vetoes by an absolute majority. Nonetheless, the Senate retained a limited number of specific functions—such as ratifying international treaties, authorizing cooperation agreements between autonomous communities, enforcing direct rule, regulating interterritorial compensation funds, and taking part in constitutional amendments and in the appointment of members to the Constitutional Court and the General Council of the Judiciary—which were not subject to override by Congress.

=== Date ===
The term of each chamber of the Cortes Generales—the Congress and the Senate—expired four years from the date of their previous election, unless they were dissolved earlier. The election decree was required to be issued no later than 25 days before the scheduled expiration date of parliament and published on the following day in the Official State Gazette (BOE), with election day taking place 54 days after the decree's publication. The previous election was held on 14 March 2004, which meant that the chambers' terms would have expired on 14 March 2008. The election decree was required to be published in the BOE no later than 19 February 2008, setting the latest possible date for election day on 13 April 2008.

The prime minister had the prerogative to propose the monarch to dissolve both chambers at any given time—either jointly or separately—and call a snap election, provided that no motion of no confidence was in process, no state of emergency was in force and that dissolution did not occur before one year after a previous one. Additionally, both chambers were to be dissolved and a new election called if an investiture process failed to elect a prime minister within a two-month period from the first ballot. Barring this exception, there was no constitutional requirement for simultaneous elections to the Congress and the Senate. Still, as of 2026, there has been no precedent of separate elections taking place under the 1978 Constitution.

Speculation on a snap election emerged since late 2004, when it was hypothesized that one could be held from mid-to-late 2006 over the difficult alliance with ERC and to take advantage of positive results in the 2005 referendum and regional elections. Another commented scenario was an early call in the fall of 2007, five months ahead of schedule, in a scenario similar to the 1989 election. Zapatero's government dispelled such claims and insisted on serving out the full legislative term. In November 2007, it was announced by the Andalusian president, Manuel Chaves, that he had agreed with Zapatero to hold the regional election in Andalusia simultaneously with the general election in March, with the latter confirming the date of 9 March after the approval of the 2008 budget, on 20 December.

The Cortes Generales were officially dissolved on 15 January 2008 with the publication of the corresponding decree in the BOE, setting election day for 9 March and scheduling for both chambers to reconvene on 1 April.

=== Electoral system ===
Voting for each chamber of the Cortes Generales was based on universal suffrage, comprising all Spanish nationals over 18 years of age with full political rights, provided that they had not been deprived of the right to vote by a final sentence, nor were legally incapacitated.

The Congress of Deputies had a minimum of 300 and a maximum of 400 seats, with electoral provisions fixing its size at 350. Of these, 348 were elected in 50 multi-member constituencies corresponding to the provinces of Spain—each of which was assigned an initial minimum of two seats and the remaining 248 distributed in proportion to population—using the D'Hondt method and closed-list proportional voting, with a three percent-threshold of valid votes (including blank ballots) in each constituency. The remaining two seats were allocated to Ceuta and Melilla as single-member districts elected by plurality voting. The use of this electoral method resulted in a higher effective threshold depending on district magnitude and vote distribution.

As a result of the aforementioned allocation, each Congress multi-member constituency was entitled the following seats:

Seats	Constituencies
35	Madrid
31	Barcelona
16	Valencia
12	Alicante^{(+1)}, Seville
10	Málaga, Murcia^{(+1)}
9	Cádiz
8	A Coruña^{(−1)}, Asturias, Balearic Islands, Biscay^{(−1)}, Las Palmas
7	Granada, Pontevedra, Santa Cruz de Tenerife, Zaragoza
6	Almería^{(+1)}, Badajoz, Córdoba^{(−1)}, Girona, Guipúzcoa, Jaén, Tarragona, Toledo^{(+1)}
5	Cantabria, Castellón, Ciudad Real, Huelva, León, Navarre, Valladolid
4	Álava, Albacete, Burgos, Cáceres, La Rioja, Lleida, Lugo, Ourense, Salamanca
3	Ávila, Cuenca, Guadalajara, Huesca, Palencia, Segovia, Teruel, Zamora
2	Soria^{(−1)}

208 Senate seats were elected using open-list (Note: Parties could group candidates into lists, although each candidate was treated separately for the purpose of the voting procedure.) partial block voting: voters in constituencies electing four seats could choose up to three candidates; in those with two or three seats, up to two; and in single-member districts, one. Each of the 47 peninsular provinces was allocated four seats, while in insular provinces—such as the Balearic and Canary Islands—the districts were the islands themselves, with the larger ones (Mallorca, Gran Canaria and Tenerife) being allocated three seats each, and the smaller ones (Menorca, Ibiza–Formentera, Fuerteventura, La Gomera, El Hierro, Lanzarote and La Palma) one each. Ceuta and Melilla elected two seats each. Additionally, autonomous communities could appoint at least one senator each and were entitled to one additional seat per million inhabitants.

The law did not provide for by-elections to fill vacant seats; instead, any vacancies arising after the proclamation of candidates and during the legislative term were filled by the next candidates on the party lists or, when required, by designated substitutes.

=== Outgoing parliament ===
The tables below show the composition of the parliamentary groups in both chambers at the time of dissolution.

Parliamentary composition in January 2008
Congress of Deputies
Groups	Parties	Deputies	
Groups	Parties	Seats	Total
Socialist Parliamentary Group of the Congress	PSOE	142	164
Socialist Parliamentary Group of the Congress	PSC	20	164
Socialist Parliamentary Group of the Congress	LV	1	164
Socialist Parliamentary Group of the Congress	EV–OV	1	164
People's Parliamentary Group in the Congress	PP	145	147
People's Parliamentary Group in the Congress	UPN	2	147
Catalan Parliamentary Group (Convergence and Union)	CDC	6	10
Catalan Parliamentary Group (Convergence and Union)	UDC	4	10
Republican Left's Parliamentary Group	ERC	8	8
Basque Parliamentary Group (EAJ/PNV)	EAJ/PNV	7	7
United Left–Initiative for Catalonia Greens'; Parliamentary Group	IU	2	5
United Left–Initiative for Catalonia Greens'; Parliamentary Group	ICV	2	5
United Left–Initiative for Catalonia Greens'; Parliamentary Group	IdPV	1	5
Mixed Parliamentary Group	CC	2	9
Mixed Parliamentary Group	BNG	2	9
Mixed Parliamentary Group	NC	1	9
Mixed Parliamentary Group	CHA	1	9
Mixed Parliamentary Group	EA	1	9
Mixed Parliamentary Group	NaBai	1	9
Mixed Parliamentary Group	INDEP	1 (Note: Joaquín Calomarde, former PP legislator.)	9

Parliamentary composition in January 2008
Senate
Groups	Parties	Senators	
Groups	Parties	Seats	Total
People's Parliamentary Group in the Senate	PP	119	123
People's Parliamentary Group in the Senate	UPN	3	123
People's Parliamentary Group in the Senate	IF	1	123
Socialist Parliamentary Group	PSOE	98	98
Catalan Agreement of Progress; Parliamentary Group	PSC	10	16
Catalan Agreement of Progress; Parliamentary Group	ERC	4	16
Catalan Agreement of Progress; Parliamentary Group	ICV	1	16
Catalan Agreement of Progress; Parliamentary Group	EUiA	1	16
Basque Nationalist Senators' Parliamentary Group	EAJ/PNV	8	8
Convergence and Union's; Catalan Parliamentary Group in the Senate	CDC	5	6
Convergence and Union's; Catalan Parliamentary Group in the Senate	UDC	1	6
Canarian Coalition Senators' Parliamentary Group	CC	3	4
Canarian Coalition Senators' Parliamentary Group	AHI	1	4
Mixed Parliamentary Group	BNG	1	4
Mixed Parliamentary Group	PAR	1	4
Mixed Parliamentary Group	PSM	1	4
Mixed Parliamentary Group	INDEP	1 (Note: Francisco Javier Tuñón, appointed senator for Navarre (supported by UPN, PSN–PSOE, CDN and IUN).)	4

== Candidates ==
=== Nomination rules ===
Spanish citizens with the right to vote could run for election, provided that they had not been criminally imprisoned by a final sentence or convicted—whether final or not—of offences that involved loss of eligibility or disqualification from public office (such as rebellion, terrorism or other crimes against the state). Additional causes of ineligibility applied to the following officials:

- Members of the Spanish royal family and their spouses;
- Holders of a number of senior public or institutional posts, including the heads and members of higher courts and state institutions; (Note: These comprised the Constitutional Court, the General Council of the Judiciary, the Supreme Court, the Council of State, the Court of Auditors and the Economic and Social Council.) the Ombudsman; the State's Attorney General; high-ranking officials of government departments, the Office of the Prime Minister and other state agencies; government delegates in the autonomous communities; the director-general of RTVE; the director of the Electoral Register Office; the governor and deputy governor of the Bank of Spain; the heads of official credit institutions; and members of electoral commissions and of the Nuclear Safety Council;
- Heads of diplomatic missions abroad;
- Judges and public prosecutors in active service;
- Members of the Armed Forces and law enforcement bodies in active service.

Other ineligibility provisions also applied to a number of territorial officials in these categories within their areas of jurisdiction, as well as to employees of foreign states and members of regional governments.

Incompatibility rules included those of ineligibility, and also barred running in multiple constituencies or lists, and combining legislative roles (deputy, senator, and regional lawmaker) with each other or with:

- A number of senior public or institutional posts, including the presidency of the National Commission on Markets and Competition; and leadership positions in RTVE, government offices, public authorities (such as port authorities, hydrographic confederations, or highway concessionary companies), public entities and state-owned or publicly funded companies;
- Any other paid public or private position, except university teaching.

=== Parties and lists ===
The electoral law allowed for parties and federations registered in the interior ministry, alliances and groupings of electors to present lists of candidates. Parties and federations intending to form an alliance were required to inform the relevant electoral commission within 10 days of the election call, whereas groupings of electors needed to secure the signature of at least one percent of the electorate in the constituencies for which they sought election, disallowing electors from signing for more than one list. Amendments in 2007 required a balanced composition of men and women in the electoral lists, so that candidates of either sex made up at least 40 percent of the total composition.

Below is a list of the main parties and alliances which contested the election:

Candidacy	Parties and alliances	Leading candidate	Ideology	Previous result				Gov.	Ref.
Candidacy	Parties and alliances	Leading candidate	Ideology	Congress		Senate		Gov.	Ref.
Candidacy	Parties and alliances	Leading candidate	Ideology	Vote %	Seats	Vote %	Seats	Gov.	Ref.
PSOE	List: Spanish Socialist Workers' Party (PSOE); Socialists' Party of Catalonia (PSC); Coalition for Melilla (CpM)	José Luis Rodríguez Zapatero	Social democracy	42.6%	164	36.5% (Note: Results in the 2004 Senate election, not including Ibiza–Formentera and Menorca.)	81	Yes	
PP	List: People's Party (PP); Navarrese People's Union (UPN); Independents of Fuerteventura (IF)	Mariano Rajoy	Conservatism; Christian democracy	37.7%	148	37.9%	102	No	
CiU	List: Convergence and Union (CiU) – Democratic Convergence of Catalonia (CDC) – Democratic Union of Catalonia (UDC)	Josep Antoni Duran i Lleida	Catalan nationalism Centrism	3.2%	10	3.8%	4	No	
esquerra	List: Republican Left of Catalonia (ERC)	Joan Ridao	Catalan independence Left-wing nationalism Social democracy	2.5%	8	Contested in alliance (Note: PSC–PSOE (8 senators), ERC (3 senators), ICV (1 senator) and EUiA (0 senators) contested the 2004 Senate election within the Entesa alliance.)		No	
EAJ/PNV	List: Basque Nationalist Party (EAJ/PNV)	Josu Erkoreka	Basque nationalism Christian democracy	1.6%	7	1.7%	6	No	
IU	List: United Left (IU) – Communist Party of Spain (PCE) – Collective for the Unity of Workers–Andalusian Left Bloc (CUT–BAI) – Revolutionary Workers' Party (POR); Initiative for Catalonia Greens–United and Alternative Left (ICV–EUiA) – Initiative for Catalonia Greens (ICV) – United and Alternative Left (EUiA); United Left–Greens (EB–B); Bloc for Asturias (BA); The Greens of Asturias (LVA); The Greens of Mallorca (LVM); United and Republican Left (EUPV–IR) – United Left of the Valencian Country (EUPV) – Republican Left (IR)	Gaspar Llamazares	Socialism; Communism	5.0%	5	4.1% (Note: Results in the 2004 Senate election, not including Menorca.)	0	No	
CC–PNC	List: Canarian Coalition (CC); Canarian Nationalist Party (PNC); Independent Herrenian Group (AHI)	Ana Oramas	Regionalism; Canarian nationalism Centrism	0.9%	3	0.6%	3	No	
BNG	List: Galician Nationalist Bloc (BNG) – Galician People's Union (UPG) – Socialist Collective (CS) – Galician Nationalist Party–Galicianist Party (PNG–PG) – Nationalist Left (EN) – Inzar (Inzar) – Movement for the Grassroots (MpB) – Irmandiño Meeting (EI)	Francisco Jorquera	Galician nationalism Left-wing nationalism Socialism	0.8%	2	1.1%	0	No	
CHA	List: Aragonese Union (CHA)	Bizén Fuster	Aragonese nationalism Eco-socialism	0.4%	1	0.3%	0	No	
EA	List: Basque Solidarity (EA)	Nekane Altzelai	Basque nationalism Social democracy	0.3%	1	0.3%	0	No	
NaBai	List: Basque Solidarity (EA); Aralar (Aralar); Basque Nationalist Party (EAJ/PNV); Assembly (Batzarre)	Uxue Barkos	Basque nationalism Social democracy	0.2%	1	0.3%	0	No	
PSC–ERC– ICV–EUiA	List: Socialists' Party of Catalonia (PSC); Republican Left of Catalonia (ERC); Initiative for Catalonia Greens (ICV); United and Alternative Left (EUiA)	Maite Arqué	Catalanism; Social democracy Eco-socialism	Did not contest		8.7%	12	No	
PSOE–ExC	List: Spanish Socialist Workers' Party (PSOE) (Note: In Ibiza–Formentera.); Ibiza for Change (ExC) – United Left of Ibiza (EU) – The Greens (Verds) – Nationalist and Ecologist Agreement (ENE) – Republican Left of Catalonia (ERC)	Pere Torres	Progressivism	Did not contest		0.0% (Note: Results for PSOE (0.0%, 0 senators) and EU–ENE–ERC (0.0%, 0 senators) in the 2004 Senate election in Ibiza–Formentera.)	0	15	
PSOE–EU– PSM–Verds	List: Spanish Socialist Workers' Party (PSOE) (Note: In Menorca.); United Left (EU); Socialist Party of Menorca (PSM); The Greens (Verds)	Arturo Bagur	Progressivism	Did not contest		0.0% (Note: Results for PSOE (0.0%, 0 senators), PSM–EN (0.0%, 0 senators) and EM–EU (0.0%, 0 senators) in the 2004 Senate election in Menorca.)	0	15	
UPyD	List: Union, Progress and Democracy (UPyD)	Rosa Díez	Social liberalism Radical centrism	Did not contest				No	

In the Canary Islands, an alliance was formed between New Canaries (NC) and Nationalist Canarian Centre (CCN), two splinter groups from Canarian Coalition. In the Valencian Community, Valencian People's Initiative (IdPV)—splinter from United Left of the Valencian Country (EUPV)—joined a coalition with the Valencian Nationalist Bloc (Bloc) and The Greens–Ecologist Left of the Valencian Country (EVEE). Unity for the Isles, an electoral alliance based in the Balearic Islands, was formed by PSM–Nationalist Agreement (PSM–EN), Majorcan Union (UM), Republican Left of Catalonia (ERC), Agreement for Majorca (ExM) and The Greens of Menorca (EV–Me).

== Campaign ==
=== Timetable ===
The key dates are listed below (all times are CET. The Canary Islands used WET (UTC+0) instead):

- 14 January: The election decree is issued with the countersign of the prime minister, after deliberation in the Council of Ministers, ratified by the King.
- 15 January: Formal dissolution of parliament and start of prohibition period on the inauguration of public works, services or projects.
- 18 January: Initial constitution of provincial and zone electoral commissions with judicial members.
- 21 January: Division of constituencies into polling sections and stations.
- 25 January: Deadline for parties and federations to report on their electoral alliances.
- 28 January: Deadline for electoral register consultation for the purpose of possible corrections.
- 4 February: Deadline for parties, federations, alliances, and groupings of electors to present electoral lists.
- 6 February: Publication of submitted electoral lists in the Official State Gazette (BOE).
- 9 February: Deadline for non-resident citizens (electors residing abroad (CERA) and citizens temporarily absent from Spain) to apply for voting.
- 11 February: Official proclamation of validly submitted electoral lists.
- 12 February: Publication of proclaimed electoral lists in the BOE.
- 13 February: Deadline for the selection of polling station members by sortition.
- 21 February: Deadline for the appointment of non-judicial members to provincial and zone electoral commissions.
- 22 February: Official start of electoral campaigning.
- 28 February: Deadline to apply for postal voting.
- 4 March: Start of legal ban on electoral opinion polling publication; deadline for CERA citizens to vote by mail.
- 5 March: Deadline for postal and temporarily absent voting.
- 7 March: Last day of electoral campaigning; deadline for CERA voting.
- 8 March: Official election silence ("reflection day").
- 9 March: Election day (polling stations open at 9 am and close at 8 pm or once voters present in a queue at/outside the polling station at 8 pm have cast their vote); provisional vote counting.
- 12 March: Start of general vote counting, including CERA votes.
- 15 March: Deadline for the general vote counting.
- 24 March: Deadline for the proclamation of elected members.
- 3 April: Deadline for the reconvening of parliament (date determined by the election decree, which for the 2008 election was set for 1 April).
- 3 May: Deadline for the publication of definitive election results in the BOE.

=== Party slogans ===
Party or alliance	Original slogan	English translation	Ref.
PSOE	« Motivos para creer » (Note: Under this generic slogan, the party launched another thirteen interchangeable expressions: Spanish: Por todo lo que merece la pena (English: "For all what matters"); Spanish: Comprometidos con la Igualdad (English: "Committed to Equality"); Spanish: Vivimos juntos, decidimos juntos (English: "We live together, we decide together"); Spanish: No es lo mismo (English: "Is not the same"); Spanish: Porque lo estamos consiguiendo (English: "Because we are getting it done"); Spanish: Somos más (English: "We are more"); Spanish: Soñar con los pies en la tierra (English: "Head in the clouds, feet on the ground"); Spanish: Por todo lo logrado (English: "For everything achieved"); Spanish: Por el pleno empleo (English: "For full employment"); Spanish: Porque no está todo hecho (English: "Because everything is not done"); Spanish: La octava potencia económica, la primera en derechos sociales (English: "Eight economic power, first in social rights"); Spanish: Ahora que avanzamos, por qué retroceder (English: "Now that we move forward, why going back?"); Spanish: Podemos llegar tan lejos como queramos (English: "We can reach as far as we want"))	"Reasons to believe"	
PP	« Con cabeza y corazón »	"With brain and heart"	
CiU	« El teu vot farà respectar Catalunya »	"Your vote will make Catalonia to be respected"	
esquerra	« Objectiu: Un país de primera »	"Goal: A first class country"	
EAJ/PNV	« Euskadin bizi naiz ni, zu, non bizi zara? » « Yo vivo en Euskadi, tú ¿dónde vives? »	"I live in the Basque Country, where do you live?"	
IU	« LlamazarES + izquierda »	"LlamazarES (is) more left"	
CC–PNC	« Habla canario, ponte en tu sitio »	"Speak, Canarian, claim your place"	
BNG	« Contigo, Galiza decide »	"With you, Galicia decides"	
CHA	« Aragón con más fuerza »	"Aragon, with more strength"	
EA	« Herriaren ahotsa » « La voz del pueblo »	"The voice of the people"	
NaBai	« Moogi, moogi. Mugi gaitezen, mugi dezagun » « Movámonos, movámoslo »	"Let's move us, let's move it"	
UPyD	« Lo que nos une »	"What unites us"	

Although the official electoral campaign period in Spain only lasts for the 15 days before the election, (with the exception of the day just before the election), many parties, especially the PP and PSOE, start their "pre-campaigns" months in advance, often before having finalized their electoral lists.

The first phase campaign was done under the slogan "Con Z de Zapatero" (With Z of Zapatero), a joke based on the Prime Minister and socialist candidate's habit of tending to pronounce words ending with D as if they ended with Z. The campaign was linked to terms like equality (Igualdad-Igualdaz) or solidarity (Solidaridad-Solidaridaz), emphasizing the policies carried out by the current government. The second phase was done under the slogan "La Mirada Positiva" (The Positive outlook), emphasising the future government platform, and "Vota con todas tus fuerzas" (Vote with all of your strength), aiming to mobilize the indecisive or potentially abstaining voters. Another common slogan through all the campaign was "Motivos para creer" (Reasons to believe in).

For the pre-campaign the PP used the slogan "Con Rajoy es Posible" (With Rajoy it's Possible). Usually emphasizing PP's campaign proposals, such as "Llegar a fin de mes, Con Rajoy es Posible" (Making ends meet, With Rajoy it's Possible). IU accused PP of copying its slogan from the last municipal elections

IU chose the pre-campaign slogan "LlamazarES + Más Izquierda" (LlamazarES (is) More Left), calling attention to their position as the third national party.

=== Events and issues ===
The economy became a major campaign issue due to a number of factors:

- A slowing down in the housing market, with prices even beginning to fall in some areas.
- Sharp increases in prices of some basic commodities.
- Global instability as a result of market uncertainty.
- A rise in unemployment.

The sudden emergence of the economy as a political issue came after several years of steady economic growth, and led some observers to suggest that maybe the government would have benefitted from calling an earlier election. In addition to those factors both the PP and the PSOE made competing proposals on taxation.

=== Debates ===
2008 Spanish general election debates
Date	Organizer(s)	Moderator(s)	P Present (Note: Denotes a main invitee attending the event.) S Surrogate (Note: Denotes a main invitee not attending the event, sending a surrogate in their place.) NI Not invited I Invited A Absent invitee								
Date	Organizer(s)	Moderator(s)	PSOE	PP	IU	CiU	ERC	PNV	CC	Share	Ref.
21 February	Antena 3 (Note: Economic debate.)	Matías Prats	P Solbes	P Pizarro	NI	NI	NI	NI	NI	24.4% (4,784,000)	
25 February	ATV	Manuel Campo Vidal	P Zapatero	P Rajoy	NI	NI	NI	NI	NI	59.1% (13,043,000)	
28 February	RTVE	Ana Blanco	S Jáuregui	S G. Pons	S Muñoz	S Jané	P Ridao	P Erkoreka	S Bañuelos	11.1% (1,759,000)	
3 March	ATV	Olga Viza	P Zapatero	P Rajoy	NI	NI	NI	NI	NI	56.3% (11,952,000)	
5 March	La 1 (59 segundos)	Ana Pastor	S Jáuregui	S G. Pons	S Nieto	S Xuclà	S Cerdà	P Erkoreka	P Oramas	10.4% (1,774,000)	

Opinion polls

Candidate viewed as "performing best" or "most convincing" in each debate
Debate	Polling firm/Commissioner	PSOE	PP	Tie	None	Question
21 February	TNS Demoscopia/Antena 3	47.4	37.0	–	15.6	–
25 February	Sigma Dos/El Mundo	45.5	42.0	–	–	12.5
25 February	Metroscopia/El País	46.0	42.0	12.0	–	–
25 February	Opina/Cuatro	45.4	33.4	8.2	–	13.0
25 February	Invymark/laSexta	45.7	30.1	24.1	–	–
25 February	TNS Demoscopia/Antena 3	45.4	39.3	–	15.3	–
3 March	Sigma Dos/El Mundo	49.0	40.2	–	–	10.8
3 March	Metroscopia/El País	53.0	38.0	9.0	–	–
3 March	Opina/Cuatro	50.8	29.0	13.4	–	6.8
3 March	Invymark/laSexta	49.2	29.8	21.0	–	–
3 March	CIS	53.3	21.5	6.9	15.8	2.5

== Opinion polls ==
Local regression trend line of poll results from 14 March 2004 to 9 March 2008, with each line corresponding to a political party.

== Voter turnout ==
The table below shows registered voter turnout during the election. Figures for election day do not include non-resident citizens, while final figures do.

Region	Time (Election day)									Final		
Region	14:00			18:00			20:00			Final		
Region	2004	2008	+/–	2004	2008	+/–	2004	2008	+/–	2004	2008	+/–
Andalusia	40.99%	39.06%	−1.93	63.16%	59.51%	−3.65	75.96%	73.79%	−2.17	74.77%	72.77%	−2.00
Aragon	42.56%	42.40%	−0.16	62.78%	61.39%	−1.39	78.01%	76.79%	−1.22	77.04%	75.92%	−1.12
Asturias	38.50%	38.39%	−0.11	60.41%	59.55%	−0.86	74.40%	73.82%	−0.58	71.73%	71.29%	−0.44
Balearic Islands	40.86%	39.18%	−1.68	58.28%	56.07%	−2.21	69.45%	68.19%	−1.26	68.84%	67.57%	−1.27
Basque Country	42.17%	37.30%	−4.87	61.99%	53.42%	−8.57	75.94%	64.90%	−11.04	74.97%	64.03%	−10.94
Canary Islands	30.29%	30.65%	+0.36	50.44%	49.86%	−0.58	67.69%	67.61%	−0.08	66.70%	65.87%	−0.83
Cantabria	43.67%	42.66%	−1.01	66.27%	65.17%	−1.10	79.20%	78.35%	−0.85	77.23%	76.38%	−0.85
Castile and León	42.06%	41.83%	−0.23	65.43%	63.94%	−1.49	80.00%	79.60%	−0.40	77.81%	77.66%	−0.15
Castilla–La Mancha	42.99%	42.65%	−0.34	66.41%	65.30%	−1.11	80.65%	80.64%	−0.01	79.90%	80.02%	+0.12
Catalonia	42.21%	39.31%	−2.90	62.32%	57.45%	−4.87	76.96%	71.22%	−5.74	75.96%	70.30%	−5.66
Extremadura	45.45%	43.82%	−1.63	66.68%	63.76%	−2.92	80.87%	79.68%	−1.19	79.26%	78.55%	−0.71
Galicia	34.68%	35.60%	+0.92	61.48%	60.73%	−0.75	76.09%	75.46%	−0.63	70.97%	70.48%	−0.49
La Rioja	46.75%	45.81%	−0.94	66.24%	65.08%	−1.16	80.77%	80.77%	±0.00	79.46%	79.29%	−0.17
Madrid	38.84%	41.67%	+2.83	63.78%	65.18%	+1.40	80.74%	80.88%	+0.14	78.93%	79.08%	+0.15
Murcia	44.00%	45.74%	+1.74	66.36%	67.46%	+1.10	78.05%	80.47%	+2.42	77.06%	79.58%	+2.52
Navarre	41.24%	42.72%	+1.48	62.83%	59.92%	−2.91	77.59%	73.25%	−4.34	76.22%	72.06%	−4.16
Valencian Community	46.49%	47.57%	+1.08	66.46%	66.74%	+0.28	78.82%	79.66%	+0.84	77.71%	78.84%	+1.13
Ceuta	34.39%	31.87%	−2.52	51.47%	49.81%	−1.66	65.13%	64.75%	−0.38	63.45%	63.32%	−0.13
Melilla	29.56%	31.08%	+1.52	45.98%	47.93%	+1.95	58.56%	66.59%	+8.03	55.84%	63.68%	+7.84
Total	41.02%	40.46%	−0.56	63.02%	60.95%	−2.07	77.26%	75.35%	−1.91	75.66%	73.85%	−1.81

== Results ==
=== Congress of Deputies ===
← Summary of the 9 March 2008 Congress of Deputies election results →
Parties and alliances	Popular vote			Seats	
Parties and alliances	Votes	%	±pp	Total	+/−
Spanish Socialist Workers' Party (PSOE)	11,289,335	43.87	+1.28	169	+5
People's Party (PP)	10,278,010	39.94	+2.23	154	+6
United Left (IU)	969,946	3.77	−1.19	2	−3
Convergence and Union (CiU)	779,425	3.03	−0.20	10	±0
Basque Nationalist Party (EAJ/PNV)	306,128	1.19	−0.44	6	−1
Union, Progress and Democracy (UPyD)	306,079	1.19	New	1	+1
Republican Left of Catalonia (esquerra)	298,139	1.16	−1.36	3	−5
Galician Nationalist Bloc (BNG)	212,543	0.83	+0.02	2	±0
Canarian Coalition–Canarian Nationalist Party (CC–PNC)^{1}	174,629	0.68	−0.25	2	−1
Andalusian Coalition (CA)^{2}	68,679	0.27	−0.52	0	±0
Navarre Yes (NaBai)	62,398	0.24	±0.00	1	±0
Basque Solidarity (EA)	50,371	0.20	−0.11	0	−1
The Greens (Verdes)	49,355	0.19	−0.01	0	±0
The Greens (Verdes)	41,531	0.16	+0.10	0	±0
The Greens (EV–LV)^{3}	7,824	0.03	−0.11	0	±0
Citizens–Party of the Citizenry (C's)	46,313	0.18	New	0	±0
Anti-Bullfighting Party Against Mistreatment of Animals (PACMA)	44,795	0.17	New	0	±0
Aragonese Party (PAR)	40,054	0.16	+0.02	0	±0
Aragonese Union (CHA)	38,202	0.15	−0.21	0	−1
New Canaries–Canarian Centre (NC–CCN)	38,024	0.15	New	0	±0
The Greens–Green Group (LV–GV)	30,840	0.12	+0.07	0	±0
Aralar (Aralar)	29,989	0.12	−0.03	0	±0
Bloc–Initiative–Greens (Bloc–IdPV–EVEE)	29,760	0.12	−0.04	0	±0
Unity for the Isles (UIB)^{4}	25,454	0.10	n/a	0	±0
For a Fairer World (PUM+J)	23,318	0.09	New	0	±0
The Greens of Europe (LVdE)^{5}	20,419	0.08	±0.00	0	±0
Social Democratic Party (PSD)	20,126	0.08	New	0	±0
Communist Party of the Peoples of Spain (PCPE)	20,030	0.08	+0.03	0	±0
Citizens for Blank Votes (CenB)	14,193	0.06	−0.10	0	±0
Spanish Phalanx of the CNSO (FE de las JONS)	14,023	0.05	±0.00	0	±0
National Democracy (DN)	12,836	0.05	−0.01	0	±0
The Greens–The Ecologist Alternative (EV–AE)	12,561	0.05	−0.07	0	±0
Family and Life Party (PFyV)	9,882	0.04	−0.02	0	±0
Humanist Party (PH)	9,056	0.04	−0.04	0	±0
Party of Almería (PdeAL)	8,451	0.03	New	0	±0
Navarrese Cannabis Representation (RCN/NOK)	7,769	0.03	−0.04	0	±0
Internationalist Socialist Workers' Party (POSI)	7,386	0.03	±0.00	0	±0
Spanish Alternative (AES)	7,300	0.03	New	0	±0
Spain 2000 (E–2000)	6,906	0.03	+0.01	0	±0
Catalan Republican Party (RC)	6,746	0.03	New	0	±0
Valencian Coalition (CVa)	5,424	0.02	New	0	±0
Unsubmissive Seats–Alternative of Discontented Democrats (Ei–ADD)	5,035	0.02	+0.01	0	±0
Commoners' Land (TC)	4,796	0.02	−0.01	0	±0
Authentic Phalanx (FA)	4,607	0.02	±0.00	0	±0
Leonese People's Union (UPL)	4,509	0.02	−0.03	0	±0
Internationalist Solidarity and Self-Management (SAIn)	3,885	0.02	New	0	±0
Engine and Sports Alternative (AMD)	3,829	0.01	New	0	±0
Pensioners in Action Party (PDLPEA)	3,050	0.01	New	0	±0
Republican Left (IR)	2,899	0.01	−0.06	0	±0
Riojan Party (PR)	2,837	0.01	New	0	±0
National Alliance (AN)	2,737	0.01	+0.01	0	±0
Alternative in Blank (ABLA)	2,460	0.01	New	0	±0
United Extremadura (EU)	2,346	0.01	−0.01	0	±0
The Greens–Green Alternative (EV–AV)	2,028	0.01	±0.00	0	±0
Carlist Party (PC)	1,956	0.01	±0.00	0	±0
Party for Catalonia (PxCat)	1,919	0.01	New	0	±0
Non-Smokers' Party (PNF)	1,616	0.01	New	0	±0
Union for Leganés (ULEG)	1,566	0.01	New	0	±0
Spanish Front (Frente)	1,539	0.01	New	0	±0
Liberal Democratic Centre (CDL)	1,503	0.01	New	0	±0
Valencian Nationalist Option (ONV)	1,490	0.01	New	0	±0
Democratic and Social Centre (CDS)	1,362	0.01	−0.12	0	±0
Andecha Astur (AA)	1,299	0.01	±0.00	0	±0
Regionalist Party of the Leonese Country (PREPAL)	1,278	0.00	−0.01	0	±0
Spanish Democratic Centre (CDEs)	1,047	0.00	New	0	±0
Canarian Nationalist Alternative (ANC)	1,017	0.00	New	0	±0
Civil Liberties Party (PLCI)	888	0.00	New	0	±0
Unity (Unidá)	848	0.00	New	0	±0
Liberal Party of State Employment and Housing (PLEVE)	786	0.00	New	0	±0
Internationalist Struggle (LI (LIT–CI))	722	0.00	±0.00	0	±0
Unity of the People (UP)	699	0.00	New	0	±0
For the Valencian Republic (plRV)	645	0.00	New	0	±0
Centrist Party (PCTR)	509	0.00	New	0	±0
Movement for the Unity of the Canarian People (MUPC)	497	0.00	New	0	±0
Aragon United Citizens Party (pCUA)	475	0.00	New	0	±0
Citizens' Union–Independent Progressives of Canaries (UC–PIC)	464	0.00	New	0	±0
Kingdom of Valencia Identity (IRV)	449	0.00	−0.01	0	±0
Regionalist Unity of Castile and León (URCL)	423	0.00	New	0	±0
State of Spain Unionist Party (PUEDE)	414	0.00	New	0	±0
People of El Bierzo (PB–UB)	385	0.00	New	0	±0
Islander Party of the Balearic Islands (PIIB)	360	0.00	New	0	±0
Christian Positivist Party (PPCr)	300	0.00	±0.00	0	±0
Carlist Traditionalist Communion (CTC)	218	0.00	New	0	±0
Asturian Democratic Convergence (CDAS)	216	0.00	New	0	±0
Merindades of Castile Initiative (IMC)	202	0.00	New	0	±0
Castilian Unity (UdCa)	198	0.00	±0.00	0	±0
European Ibero-American Alliance Party (PAIE)	174	0.00	New	0	±0
Workers for Democracy Coalition (TD)	159	0.00	±0.00	0	±0
Regionalist Party of Guadalajara (PRGU)	152	0.00	±0.00	0	±0
Balearic Alliance (ABA)	145	0.00	New	0	±0
Electronic Voting Assembly (AVE)	144	0.00	New	0	±0
Liberal Centrist Union (UCL)	124	0.00	±0.00	0	±0
Alliance for Burgos (AxB)	123	0.00	New	0	±0
Burgalese Citizen Initiative (ICBur)	109	0.00	New	0	±0
We Are (N Som)	105	0.00	New	0	±0
Independents for Cuenca (ixC)	100	0.00	New	0	±0
Citizens' Group (AGRUCI)	79	0.00	New	0	±0
Falangist Movement of Spain (MFE)	68	0.00	New	0	±0
Aitch Party (PHache)	0	0.00	New	0	±0
Blank ballots	286,182	1.11	−0.47		
Total	25,734,863			350	±0
Valid votes	25,734,863	99.36	+0.37		
Invalid votes	165,576	0.64	−0.37		
Votes cast / turnout	25,900,439	73.85	−1.81		
Abstentions	9,172,740	26.15	+1.81		
Registered voters	35,073,179				
Sources
Footnotes: ^{1} Canarian Coalition–Canarian Nationalist Party results are compared to the combined totals of Canarian Coalition and the Canarian Nationalist Party in the 2004 election.; ^{2} Andalusian Coalition results are compared to the combined totals of Andalusian Party and Socialist Party of Andalusia in the 2004 election.; ^{3} The Greens results are compared to The Eco-pacifist Greens totals in the 2004 election.; ^{4} Within the Progressives for the Balearic Islands alliance in the 2004 election.; ^{5} The Greens of Europe results are compared to The Greens of the Community of Madrid totals in the 2004 election.

Popular vote
PSOE	43.87%
PP	39.94%
IU	3.77%
CiU	3.03%
EAJ/PNV	1.19%
UPyD	1.19%
esquerra	1.16%
BNG	0.83%
CC–PNC	0.68%
NaBai	0.24%
Others	3.00%
Blank ballots	1.11%

Seats
PSOE	48.29%
PP	44.00%
CiU	2.86%
EAJ/PNV	1.71%
esquerra	0.86%
IU	0.57%
BNG	0.57%
CC–PNC	0.57%
UPyD	0.29%
NaBai	0.29%

=== Senate ===
← Summary of the 9 March 2008 Senate of Spain election results →
Parties and alliances	Popular vote			Seats	
Parties and alliances	Votes	%	±pp	Total	+/−
People's Party (PP)	28,039,592	40.20	+2.28	101	−1
Spanish Socialist Workers' Party (PSOE)^{1}	25,965,221	37.22	+0.74	86	+5
Catalan Agreement of Progress (PSC–ERC–ICV–EUiA)	5,280,590	7.57	−1.09	12	±0
Convergence and Union (CiU)	2,437,338	3.49	−0.31	4	±0
United Left (IU)^{2}	2,015,249	2.89	−1.17	0	±0
Basque Nationalist Party (EAJ/PNV)	903,072	1.29	−0.45	2	−4
Galician Nationalist Bloc (BNG)	726,317	1.04	−0.03	0	±0
Union, Progress and Democracy (UPyD)	691,695	0.99	New	0	±0
Canarian Coalition–Canarian Nationalist Party (CC–PNC)^{3}	302,729	0.43	−0.16	1	−2
Andalusian Coalition (CA)^{4}	229,917	0.33	−0.47	0	±0
Citizens–Party of the Citizenry (C's)	200,242	0.29	New	0	±0
Navarre Yes (NaBai)	183,873	0.26	+0.01	0	±0
The Greens (Verdes)	181,253	0.26	+0.09	0	±0
The Greens (Verdes)	162,124	0.23	+0.15	0	±0
The Greens (EV–LV)^{5}	19,129	0.03	−0.06	0	±0
Basque Solidarity (EA)	143,294	0.21	−0.10	0	±0
For a Fairer World (PUM+J)	133,678	0.19	New	0	±0
Aragonese Party (PAR)	132,738	0.19	+0.01	0	±0
Anti-Bullfighting Party Against Mistreatment of Animals (PACMA)	132,171	0.19	+0.10	0	±0
The Greens–Green Group (LV–GV)	112,561	0.16	+0.13	0	±0
Aragonese Union (CHA)	107,282	0.15	−0.17	0	±0
Bloc–Initiative–Greens (Bloc–IdPV–EVEE)	92,588	0.13	−0.06	0	±0
Aralar (Aralar)	75,476	0.11	−0.02	0	±0
Communist Party of the Peoples of Spain (PCPE)	66,163	0.10	+0.03	0	±0
New Canaries–Canarian Centre (NC–CCN)	65,248	0.09	New	0	±0
The Greens–The Ecologist Alternative (EV–AE)	58,725	0.08	−0.20	0	±0
The Greens of Europe (LVdE)^{6}	50,067	0.07	+0.03	0	±0
Unity for the Isles (UIB)^{7}	45,972	0.07	n/a	0	±0
Catalan Republican Party (RC)	44,394	0.06	New	0	±0
Carlist Traditionalist Communion (CTC)	44,050	0.06	+0.03	0	±0
Spanish Phalanx of the CNSO (FE de las JONS)	42,112	0.06	±0.00	0	±0
Family and Life Party (PFyV)	41,599	0.06	+0.01	0	±0
Humanist Party (PH)	38,437	0.06	−0.06	0	±0
The Greens–Green Alternative (EV–AV)	33,776	0.05	+0.04	0	±0
Social Democratic Party (PSD)	31,703	0.05	New	0	±0
Internationalist Socialist Workers' Party (POSI)	28,197	0.04	−0.04	0	±0
Republican Left of the Valencian Country (esquerra–PV)	28,089	0.04	+0.01	0	±0
Party of Almería (PdeAL)	27,651	0.04	New	0	±0
PSOE–Ibiza for Change (PSOE–ExC)^{8}	26,513	0.04	+0.01	1	+1
National Democracy (DN)	25,140	0.04	+0.01	0	±0
Carlist Party (PC)	23,685	0.03	+0.02	0	±0
Internationalist Solidarity and Self-Management (SAIn)	23,531	0.03	New	0	±0
Pensioners in Action Party (PDLPEA)	22,141	0.03	New	0	±0
Commoners' Land (TC)	21,995	0.03	−0.03	0	±0
Spanish Alternative (AES)	21,570	0.03	New	0	±0
Leonese People's Union (UPL)	21,227	0.03	−0.05	0	±0
PSOE–Left of Menorca–PSM–Greens (PSOE–EU–PSM–Verds)^{9}	21,023	0.03	±0.00	1	+1
Nation and Revolution (NyR)	19,044	0.03	New	0	±0
Republican Left (IR)	19,005	0.03	−0.01	0	±0
Spain 2000 (E–2000)	17,897	0.03	+0.01	0	±0
United Extremadura (EU)	15,110	0.02	−0.01	0	±0
National Alliance (AN)	13,113	0.02	+0.02	0	±0
Unsubmissive Seats–Alternative of Discontented Democrats (Ei–ADD)	12,149	0.02	+0.01	0	±0
Alternative in Blank (ABLA)	11,974	0.02	New	0	±0
Riojan Party (PR)	10,482	0.02	New	0	±0
Spanish Front (Frente)	10,418	0.01	New	0	±0
Valencian Coalition (CVa)	10,330	0.01	New	0	±0
Liberal Democratic Centre (CDL)	10,057	0.01	New	0	±0
Engine and Sports Alternative (AMD)	9,438	0.01	New	0	±0
Navarrese Cannabis Representation (RCN/NOK)	8,234	0.01	−0.07	0	±0
Internationalist Struggle (LI (LIT–CI))	8,224	0.01	−0.01	0	±0
Valencian Nationalist Option (ONV)	7,159	0.01	New	0	±0
Non-Smokers' Party (PNF)	7,000	0.01	New	0	±0
Party for Catalonia (PxCat)	6,805	0.01	New	0	±0
Spanish Catholic Movement (MCE)	6,234	0.01	New	0	±0
Authentic Phalanx (FA)	5,213	0.01	−0.02	0	±0
Commoners (comuner@s)	5,149	0.01	New	0	±0
Canarian Nationalist Alternative (ANC)	4,988	0.01	New	0	±0
Andecha Astur (AA)	4,964	0.01	±0.00	0	±0
Regionalist Party of the Leonese Country (PREPAL)	4,851	0.01	±0.00	0	±0
Spanish Democratic Centre (CDEs)	4,522	0.01	New	0	±0
Citizen Union for Democracy (UCiD)	3,999	0.01	New	0	±0
Natural Culture (CN)	3,687	0.01	+0.01	0	±0
Union for Leganés (ULEG)	3,096	0.00	New	0	±0
Yuntar Action (AY)	3,000	0.00	−0.10	0	±0
Unity (Unidá)	2,962	0.00	New	0	±0
Citizens' Group (AGRUCI)	2,806	0.00	New	0	±0
Regionalist Unity of Castile and León (URCL)	2,563	0.00	New	0	±0
The Republic (La República)	2,517	0.00	±0.00	0	±0
Citizens for Blank Votes (CenB)	2,507	0.00	−0.05	0	±0
Unity of the People (UP)	2,350	0.00	New	0	±0
Action for Justice (AXJ)	2,223	0.00	New	0	±0
Kingdom of Valencia Identity (IRV)	2,087	0.00	−0.01	0	±0
Aragon United Citizens Party (pCUA)	1,615	0.00	New	0	±0
For the Valencian Republic (plRV)	1,485	0.00	New	0	±0
People of El Bierzo (PB–UB)	1,417	0.00	±0.00	0	±0
Socialist Party of the People of Ceuta (PSPC)	1,323	0.00	±0.00	0	±0
Merindades of Castile Initiative (IMC)	1,311	0.00	New	0	±0
Electronic Voting Assembly (AVE)	1,273	0.00	New	0	±0
Cantabrian Party (Cántabro)	1,189	0.00	New	0	±0
Independent Alternative of Galicia (AIdG)	1,150	0.00	New	0	±0
Castilian Unity (UdCa)	942	0.00	±0.00	0	±0
Aragonese Land (TA)	928	0.00	New	0	±0
Asturian Democratic Convergence (CDAS)	925	0.00	New	0	±0
25 May Citizens' Alternative (AC25M)	773	0.00	−0.01	0	±0
Civil Liberties Party (PLCI)	712	0.00	New	0	±0
Islander Party of the Balearic Islands (PIIB)	683	0.00	New	0	±0
Regionalist Party of Guadalajara (PRGU)	656	0.00	±0.00	0	±0
Movement for the Unity of the Canarian People (MUPC)	639	0.00	New	0	±0
Christian Positivist Party (PPCr)	638	0.00	±0.00	0	±0
Galician Identity (IG)	590	0.00	New	0	±0
Citizens' Union–Independent Progressives of Canaries (UC–PIC)	494	0.00	New	0	±0
Progress Party of Castile and León Cities (PPCCAL)	484	0.00	New	0	±0
Spanish Democratic Front (FDE)	459	0.00	New	0	±0
Alternative Island (ISAL)	449	0.00	New	0	±0
Workers for Democracy Coalition (TD)	403	0.00	±0.00	0	±0
Republican Castile (CARE)	400	0.00	New	0	±0
Burgalese Citizen Initiative (ICBur)	379	0.00	New	0	±0
Democratic and Social Centre (CDS)	341	0.00	−0.13	0	±0
Independents for Cuenca (ixC)	309	0.00	New	0	±0
Liberal Centrist Union (UCL)	235	0.00	±0.00	0	±0
Falangist Movement of Spain (MFE)	218	0.00	New	0	±0
Justice and Development Party of Spain (PJDE)	105	0.00	New	0	±0
Blank ballots (Note: The percentage of blank ballots is calculated over the official number of valid votes cast, irrespective of the total number of votes shown as a result of adding up the individual results for each party.)	524,750	2.06	−0.61		
Total	69,753,316			208	±0
Valid votes	25,527,940	97.71	+0.62		
Invalid votes	597,299	2.29	−0.62		
Votes cast / turnout	26,125,239	74.49	−1.26		
Abstentions	8,947,940	25.51	+1.26		
Registered voters	35,073,179				
Sources
Footnotes: ^{1} Spanish Socialist Workers' Party results are compared to Spanish Socialist Workers' Party totals in the 2004 election, not including results in Ibiza–Formentera and Menorca.; ^{2} United Left results are compared to United Left totals in the 2004 election, not including results in Menorca.; ^{3} Canarian Coalition–Canarian Nationalist Party results are compared to the combined totals of Canarian Coalition and the Canarian Nationalist Party in the 2004 election.; ^{4} Andalusian Coalition results are compared to the combined totals of Andalusian Party and Socialist Party of Andalusia in the 2004 election.; ^{5} The Greens results are compared to The Eco-pacifist Greens totals in the 2004 election.; ^{6} The Greens of Europe results are compared to The Greens of the Community of Madrid totals in the 2004 election.; ^{7} Within the Progressives for the Balearic Islands alliance in the 2004 election.; ^{8} PSOE–Ibiza for Change results are compared to the combined totals of Spanish Socialist Workers' Party and Progressives for the Balearic Islands in Ibiza–Formentera in the 2004 election.; ^{9} PSOE–Left of Menorca–PSM–Greens results are compared to the combined totals of Spanish Socialist Workers' Party in Menorca, Socialist Party of Menorca–Nationalist Agreement and Left of Menorca in the 2004 election.

Popular vote
PP	40.20%
PSOE	37.22%
ECdP	7.57%
CiU	3.49%
IU	2.89%
EAJ/PNV	1.29%
BNG	1.04%
CC–PNC	0.43%
PSOE–ExC	0.04%
Pacte	0.03%
Others	5.03%
Blank ballots	2.06%

Seats
PP	48.56%
PSOE	41.35%
ECdP	5.77%
CiU	1.92%
EAJ/PNV	0.96%
CC–PNC	0.48%
PSOE–ExC	0.48%
Pacte	0.48%

=== Maps ===
Election results by constituency (Congress).

Vote winner strength by constituency (Congress).

Vote winner strength by autonomous community (Congress).

== Aftermath ==
=== Government formation ===
Investiture; Congress of Deputies; Nomination of José Luis Rodríguez Zapatero (PSOE)
Ballot →	9 April 2008	11 April 2008
Required majority →	176 out of 350	Simple
Yes: • PSOE (169) (168 on 9 Apr)	168 / 350	169 / 350
No: • PP (154); • ERC (3); • UPyD (1)	158 / 350	158 / 350
Abstentions: • CiU (10); • PNV (6); • IU–ICV (2); • BNG (2); • CC (2); • NaBai (1)	23 / 350	23 / 350
Abstentees: • PSOE (1) (on 9 Apr)	1 / 350	0 / 350

== Bibliography ==
Legislation

- Constitución Española (Constitution). Official State Gazette (in Spanish). 27 December 1978 [version as of 28 August 1992]. BOE-A-1978-31229.
- Ley Orgánica 5/1985, de 19 de junio, del Régimen Electoral General (Organic Law 5/1985). Official State Gazette (in Spanish). 19 June 1985 [version as of 9 October 2007]. BOE-A-1985-11672.
- Real Decreto 33/2008, de 14 de enero, de disolución del Congreso de los Diputados y del Senado y de convocatoria de elecciones (Royal Decree 33/2008). Official State Gazette (in Spanish). 14 January 2008. BOE-A-2008-641.

Other

- Carreras de Odriozola, Albert; Tafunell Sambola, Xavier (2005) [1989]. Estadísticas históricas de España, siglos XIX-XX (PDF) (in Spanish). Vol. 1 (II ed.). Bilbao: Fundación BBVA. pp. 1072–1097. ISBN 84-96515-00-1. Archived from the original (PDF) on 24 September 2015.
