= Law of Equality =

Law of Equality may refer to

- Coremans-De Vriendt law, equality of the Dutch and French languages in Belgium
- Law of Equality (Spain), requires a 40% quote for women in elections and corporate board rooms
- "Law of Equality", one of the moral laws in The Spirits Book
- Law of Equality, Fairness, and the Elimination of Discrimination Against Women

== See also ==
- Equality before the law
