= Sacred Heart Community Service =

Non-profit organization in the USA

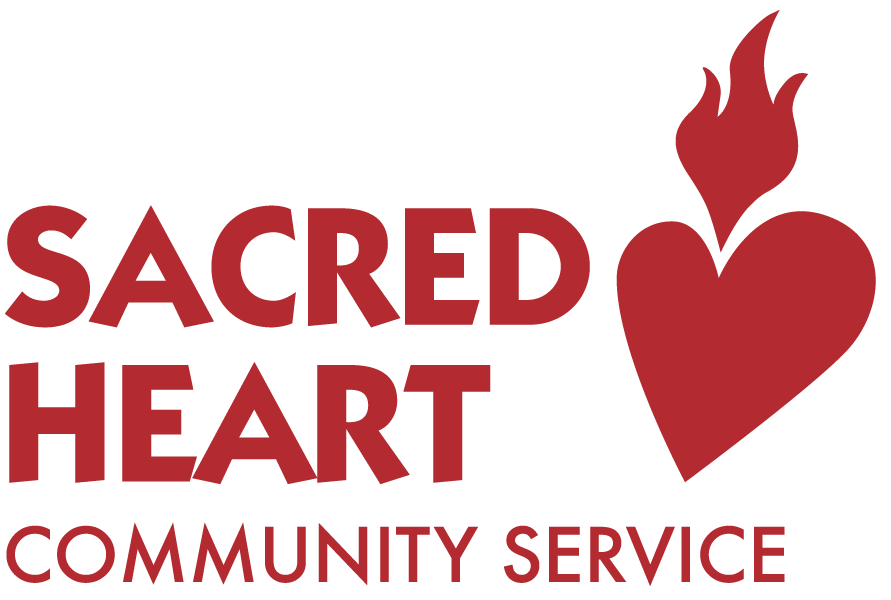
Sacred Heart Community Service

Sacred Heart Community Service (SHCS) was founded in 1964 by Louise Benson, who provided food and clothing out of her home in response to the urgent needs of her low-income neighbors. It has grown to become one of the leading providers of services to the working poor in Santa Clara County, serving more than 50,000 unduplicated children and adults in 2009 alone. The agency's strategy combines outreach and essential services (food, clothing, housing, and utility assistance) with programs that foster self-sufficiency (employment, family mentoring, citizenship, and youth and adult education).

The agency is located in San Jose, California, south of downtown at the intersection of South First and Alma streets, in the Goodyear-Mastic neighborhood, which is part of the larger Washington Area Coalition.

== History ==
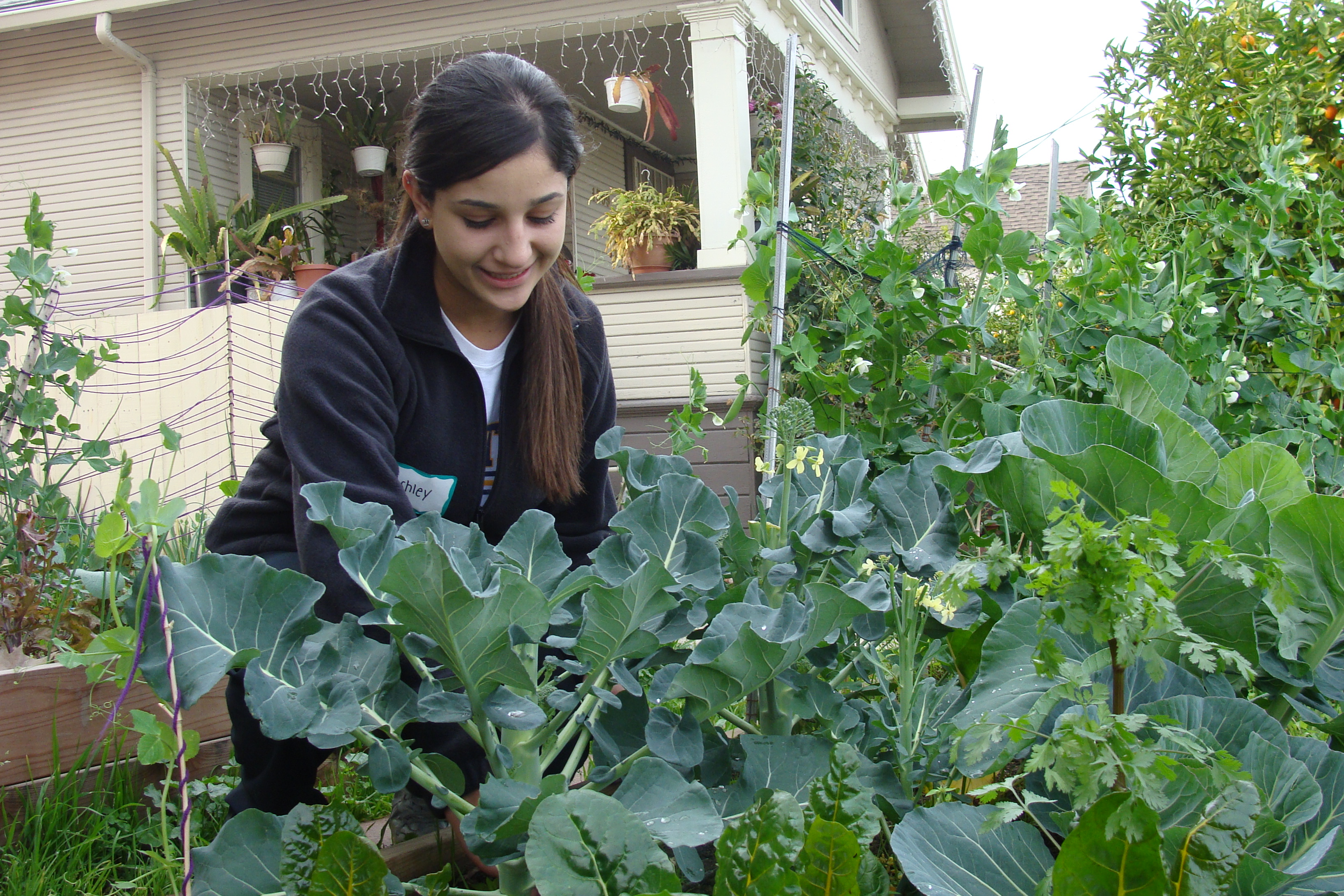
Volunteer on the property of SHCS

SHCS was founded in 1964, by Louise Benson, who at age 61 years old began distributing baskets of food from her Willow Glen home. The agency was incorporated as a 501(c)(3) charitable organization in 1972. In 2008, the agency became the Community Action Agency for Santa Clara County, a responsibility that requires The Heart to constantly assess the state of poverty in Silicon Valley and find innovative solutions to the obstacles and problems that block the achievement of self-sufficiency.

== Poverty in Santa Clara County ==
In early 2010, the unemployment rate in the county hovered about 12 percent on the average, and the under-employment rate was about 20 percent. Out of a population of just less than 1.9 million in Santa Clara County, more than 440,000 people live in households that do not earn enough to cover the basic needs of life in Silicon Valley, defined by food, shelter, clothing, transportation, utilities and healthcare.
