= List of countries by long-term unemployment rate =

This is a list of OECD countries by long-term unemployment rate published by the OECD. This indicator refers to the number of persons who have been unemployed for one year or more as a percentage of the labour force (the sum of employed and unemployed persons). Unemployed persons are defined as those who are currently not working but are willing to do so and actively searching for work.

== Rankings ==
Country/Territory	Long-term unemployment rate		
Country/Territory	2022	2016	2012
Greece	10.80%	19.47%	14.37%
Spain	5.00%	12.92%	11.13%
Italy	4.80%	7.79%	5.67%
Slovakia	3.00%	8.80%	8.89%
France	2.90%	4.21%	3.98%
Portugal	2.30%	8.28%	7.62%
Belgium	2.30%	4.26%	3.37%
Turkey	–	2.04%	2.36%
Slovenia	1.90%	5.27%	5.05%
Switzerland	1.70%	1.71%	1.48%
Luxembourg	1.70%	1.60%	1.56%
Chile	–	1.67%	2.11%
Costa Rica	1.50%	–	–
Russia	–	1.45%	1.68%
Austria	1.30%	1.53%	1.07%
Ireland	1.20%	6.68%	9.24%
Hungary	1.20%	3.78%	4.23%
Estonia	1.20%	3.32%	5.46%
Germany	1.20%	2.21%	2.52%
Finland	1.20%	1.97%	1.65%
Sweden	1.00%	1.33%	1.40%
Australia	1.00%	1.32%	0.91%
Netherlands	0.90%	2.98%	1.78%
United Kingdom	0.90%	2.22%	3.03%
Denmark	0.90%	1.66%	2.01%
Norway	0.90%	0.41%	0.28%
Brazil	–	0.81%	2.17%
Japan	0.80%	1.36%	1.67%
Iceland	0.70%	0.67%	1.69%
Poland	0.60%	3.26%	3.51%
Czech Republic	0.60%	2.72%	2.75%
United States	0.50%	1.42%	2.29%
Canada	0.50%	0.89%	0.90%
New Zealand	0.40%	0.78%	0.91%
Israel	0.20%	0.63%	1.06%
Mexico	0.10%	0.06%	0.09%
South Korea	0.00%	0.01%	0.01%

== See also ==
- Basic income
- Economics terminology that differs from common usage
- Effective unemployment rate
- Employment Protection Legislation
- Employment rate
- Federal Reserve Economic Data FRED
- Graduate unemployment
- HIRE Act
- Job migration
- Short time
- List of countries by unemployment rate
- List of U.S. states by unemployment rate
- Male unemployment
- Spatial mismatch
- Training
- Unemployment extension
- Volunteering
- Waithood
- Workfare
- Youth exclusion
- Youth unemployment
