= Youth unemployment in Spain =

For people ages 15–24 is high

Youth unemployment in Spain refers to unemployment among people in a defined youth age group, typically 15–24 or 15–29 years. The youth unemployment rate measures the share of unemployed people within a specific youth age group relative to the total labour force of the same age group, which includes both employed and unemployed individuals.

Spain has consistently recorded one of the highest youth unemployment rates in Europe. In 2024, the rate was 26.5%, more than ten percentage points above the European Union average (14.9%), and more than double Spain’s overall unemployment rate (11.4%).

Youth unemployment increased sharply following the 2008 financial crisis, when the rate exceeded 50%. Although it has declined since then, it remains structurally high compared with most other European countries. Several structural factors have been identified as contributing to this situation, including labour market segmentation, a high incidence of temporary employment among young workers, educational disparities, and difficulties in the transition from education to employment. These features reflect broader characteristics of the Spanish labour market, which has historically been characterised by a high incidence of temporary employment and a pronounced divide between permanent and temporary workers compared with many other European Union countries.

== Current statistics ==
=== Current situation ===
In the fourth quarter of 2025, the youth unemployment rate (ages 15–24) in Spain was 23.01%. Male youth unemployment stood at 22.63%, while the rate for women was 23.47%.

Youth unemployment remains substantially higher than overall unemployment. In 2024, the youth unemployment rate (15–24) was 26.5%, corresponding to approximately 473,000 unemployed young people, compared with an overall unemployment rate of 11.4%.

=== Comparison with EU countries ===
Spain consistently records one of the highest youth unemployment rates in the European Union. In 2024, the average youth unemployment rate in the European Union (EU-27) was approximately 15%, significantly below the Spanish rate.

Unemployment rate in European countries (%) in 2024
Country	Youth unemployment rate (15-24) (%)	Unemployment rate (15-74) (%)
Austria	10.3	5.2
Belgium	17.4	5.7
Bosnia and Herzegovina	2	12.6
Bulgaria	12.3	4.2
Croatia	16.8	5.0
Cyprus	13.0	4.9
Czechia	9.1	2.6
Denmark	14.6	6.2
Estonia	19.1	7.6
European Union - 27 countries (from 2020)	14.9	5.9
Finland	18.8	8.4
France	18.7	7.4
Germany	6.5	3.4
Greece	22.5	10.1
Hungary	15.2	4.5
Iceland	9.1	3.6
Ireland	10.6	4.3
Italy	20.3	6.5
Latvia	13.6	6.9
Lithuania	16.2	7.1
Luxembourg	21.6	6.4
Malta	9.2	3.2
Netherlands	8.7	3.7
North Macedonia	28.9	12.3
Norway	12.1	4.0
Poland	10.8	2.9
Portugal	21.6	6.5
Romania	23.9	5.4
Serbia	23.0	8.6
Slovakia	19.2	5.3
Slovenia	10.9	3.7
Spain	26.5	11.4
Sweden	24.3	8.4
Switzerland	8.2	4.4
Türkiye	16.4	8.8

=== Long-term trends ===
Youth unemployment in Spain increased sharply following the 2008 financial crisis. The rate exceeded 50% between 2013 and 2014, making Spain one of the European countries most severely affected by youth job losses during the Great Recession.

After 2014, youth unemployment gradually declined during the economic recovery of the late 2010s and early 2020s. Following a temporary increase during the COVID-19 pandemic in 2020–2021, the rate resumed its downward trend, falling from 35.0% in 2021 to 26.5% in 2024. Despite this improvement, it remained significantly above the European Union average.

Youth unemployment rate in Spain, 2009–2024 (%)
Year	2009	2010	2011	2012	2013	2014	2015	2016	2017	2018	2019	2020	2021	2022	2023	2024
Youth unemployment rate (15–24)	37.7	41.5	46.2	52.9	55.5	53.2	48.3	44.4	38.6	34.3	32.5	38.3	35.0	29.7	28.7	26.5

=== Regional disparities ===
Youth unemployment varies considerably across Spain’s autonomous communities.

In Q4 2025, the highest youth unemployment rates were recorded in the autonomous cities of Melilla (71.6%) and Ceuta (55.2%). Among the autonomous communities, the highest rates were observed in Extremadura (37.1%) and Andalusia (31.7%).

Lower youth unemployment rates were recorded in regions such as Cantabria (13.5%), the Balearic Islands (12.5%), and the Basque Country (15.1%).

Youth unemployment rate (15–24) by region, 2025 Q4
Region	Rate (%)
Melilla	71.6
Ceuta	55.2
Extremadura	37.1
Andalucía	31.7
Comunitat Valenciana	29.2
Galicia	28.6
Castilla-La Mancha	28.3
Navarra	26.5
La Rioja	24.3
Castilla y León	23.9
Asturias	22.4
Murcia	20.2
Canarias	19.4
Aragón	18.3
Madrid	18.1
Cataluña	17.0
País Vasco	15.1
Cantabria	13.5
Balears	12.5

=== Differences by education level ===
Youth unemployment in Spain varies significantly according to educational attainment. Young people with lower levels of education face substantially higher unemployment rates than those with upper secondary or tertiary education.

In 2024, the unemployment rate among individuals aged 15–24 with lower secondary education or less (ISCED levels 0–2) was 36.3%. The rate was lower among those with upper secondary education (ISCED levels 3–4), at 24.4%, and lowest among those with tertiary education (ISCED levels 5–8), at 19.5%.

In earlier years, unemployment rates among young people were more similar across education levels. For example, in 2002, the youth unemployment rate was 21.6% among individuals with lower secondary education, 21.3% among those with upper secondary education, and 21.5% among those with tertiary education. The gap between education groups widened significantly after the late 2000s, particularly following the economic crisis that began in 2008.

=== Age differences ===
Unemployment rates also vary across age groups within the youth population. Younger individuals tend to experience higher unemployment rates than older youth cohorts. In 2024, the unemployment rate was 40.64% among individuals aged 16–19, compared with 23.36% among those aged 20–24 and 15.16% among those aged 25–29. The unemployment rate for individuals aged 16–19 has consistently been higher than for those aged 20–24 over the past two decades.

=== Gender differences ===
Data from the National Statistics Institute (INE) show a persistent gender gap in unemployment rates across age groups. The gender gap is measured as the difference between female and male unemployment rates (female minus male), expressed in percentage points. Positive values, therefore, indicate higher unemployment among women.

Using quarterly data for the period 2002–2025, the average gender gap is largest among younger age groups. Among individuals aged 16–19, the unemployment rate for women exceeded that for men by an average of 5.6 percentage points. Among those aged 20–24, the average difference was 1.3 percentage points.

The gender gap is positive on average across all age groups, indicating slightly higher unemployment rates among women. However, the gap is more volatile among younger workers than among older age groups.

Gender gap in unemployment by age (2002-2025)
Age group	Avg. female–male gap (pp)	Share of periods with positive gap
16–19 years	5.6	0.8
20–24 years	1.3	0.56
25–54 years	3.6	0.98
55+ years	1.8	0.81

=== Long-term unemployment ===
Long-term unemployment represents the share of unemployed individuals who have been without work for 12 months or more among all unemployed.. In 2024, approximately 12.7% of unemployed women under the age of 25 and 17.2% of unemployed men in the same age group were classified as long-term unemployed.

== Related indicators ==
=== NEET rate ===
Youth unemployment is often analysed together with the NEET rate, which measures the share of young people who are not in employment, education, or training. Unlike the unemployment rate, the NEET indicator also includes young people who are not actively seeking work and therefore are not counted as unemployed.

Spain has historically recorded NEET rates above the European Union average, particularly following the 2008 financial crisis. In 2013, the NEET rate among individuals aged 15–29 exceeded 22%. The rate declined steadily during the late 2010s and early 2020s, falling to 12% by 2024, although it remained slightly above the EU average.

=== Employment conditions ===
Young workers in Spain are more likely than older workers to hold temporary or part-time contracts. Temporary employment has historically represented a large share of youth employment.

In 2021, approximately 65% of employed individuals aged 15–24 were working under temporary contracts, compared with around 21% among workers aged 25–54. The share declined in subsequent years, reaching about 42% for workers aged 15–24 and 13% for those aged 25–54 in 2024.

Part-time employment is also more common among young workers. In 2024, about 41.9% of employed individuals aged 15–24 worked part-time, compared with 13.1% among those aged 25–54.

== Causes ==
=== Educational factors ===
Educational attainment plays an important role in youth labour market outcomes. Young people with lower levels of education face significantly higher risks of unemployment and labour market exclusion. In Spain, early school leaving historically remained among the highest in the European Union, contributing to a relatively large group of young people entering the labour market with limited formal qualifications.

Early leavers from education and training in European countries in 2024
Country	Early leavers from education and training rate (%)
Türkiye	18.7
Romania	16.8
Iceland	15.3
Spain	13.0
Norway	13.0
Germany	12.9
Cyprus	11.3
Estonia	11.0
Denmark	10.4
Hungary	10.3
Italy	9.8
Finland	9.6
Malta	9.5
European Union - 27 countries (from 2020)	9.4
Lithuania	8.4
Bulgaria	8.2
Austria	8.1
North Macedonia	8.0
Latvia	7.9
Luxembourg	7.8
France	7.7
Slovakia	7.5
Sweden	7.2
Belgium	7.0
Netherlands	7.0
Portugal	6.6
Serbia	6.2
Switzerland	5.7
Czechia	5.4
Slovenia	5.0
Poland	4.1
Bosnia and Herzegovina	3.8
Greece	3.0
Ireland	2.8
Croatia	2.0

Lower educational attainment affects employment prospects through several mechanisms. Early school leaving reduces the accumulation of cognitive and transferable skills, while the absence of upper-secondary qualifications may limit access to many entry-level occupations. Employers also frequently use educational credentials as screening devices when selecting candidates for jobs

=== School-to-work transition ===
The transition from education to employment can be particularly difficult for young people with limited qualifications. Spain has historically had a vocational education and training (VET) system that is less based on the dual apprenticeship model than those found in countries such as Germany or Austria.

Only 2.6% of students in upper secondary vocational education in Spain participated in programmes combining school and work in 2023, compared with 24.5% on average in the European Union and much higher shares in countries with established dual systems such as Germany. The predominance of school-based vocational training limits opportunities for students to gain workplace experience and employer contacts before entering the labour market.

=== Labour market segmentation ===
Spain’s labour market is characterised by a dual structure between permanent and temporary contracts. Temporary contracts provide employers with flexibility but offer fewer protections and less job security. Young workers are disproportionately employed under such contracts (see the section "Employment conditions") and may experience repeated short-term employment spells. This segmentation can lead to unstable early careers and higher unemployment risks.

=== Demand-side factors ===
During economic downturns, competition for jobs intensifies, and highly educated workers may accept positions that require lower levels of education in order to avoid unemployment. This can lead to education mismatches and contribute to the crowding-out of less-educated workers in the labour market.

=== Scarring effects ===
Early experiences of unemployment or unstable employment can have long-term consequences. Studies suggest that repeated short-term jobs or prolonged unemployment early in a career can reduce future employment prospects and earnings.

== Government policies and reforms ==
Spanish governments and European institutions have introduced a range of policies aimed at reducing youth unemployment and improving young people's integration into the labour market.

=== Labour market reforms ===
Several labour market reforms have attempted to address structural features of the Spanish labour market, particularly the high prevalence of temporary employment and the resulting labour market duality.

The 2012 labour market reform, adopted during the economic crisis, sought to increase labour market flexibility and encourage job creation. Key measures included increasing internal flexibility (easier adjustment of wages and working hours to firm-specific shocks, and easier use of working-time reductions as an alternative to layoffs), reducing dismissal costs for permanent workers, simplifying collective dismissal procedures, and granting greater priority to firm-level collective bargaining agreements over sectoral agreements. The reform also introduced hiring incentives for permanent contracts, particularly for small firms. The reform was politically controversial and triggered widespread protests and two general strikes organised by major trade unions in 2012, reflecting broader debates about the balance between labour market flexibility and employment protection in Spain.

A further reform adopted in December 2021 aimed to reduce the widespread use of temporary contracts and strengthen job stability. The reform introduced stricter limits on fixed-term contracts and promoted the use of permanent and fixed-discontinuous contracts, particularly for seasonal activities. It also reinforced mechanisms allowing firms to adjust working hours during economic downturns rather than resorting to dismissals.

=== Youth Guarantee ===
Spain participates in the European Youth Guarantee, an initiative adopted by the European Union in 2013, in response to rising youth unemployment following the global financial crisis. The programme aims to ensure that all young people receive a quality offer of employment, continued education, apprenticeship, or traineeship within four months of becoming unemployed or leaving formal education.

In Spain, the initiative was implemented through the National Youth Guarantee System, introduced in 2013, as part of the Entrepreneurship and Youth Employment Strategy 2013–2016. The programme is coordinated by the national government but implemented largely by regional authorities, reflecting Spain’s decentralised governance structure in education and employment policy. Measures associated with the Youth Guarantee include vocational guidance services, training programmes, subsidised apprenticeships, and financial incentives for firms hiring young workers. Additional policies have included reductions in social security contributions for employers and programmes aimed at facilitating self-employment and entrepreneurship among young people.

In 2020, the programme was reinforced at the European level through the Reinforced Youth Guarantee, which expanded eligibility to individuals aged 15 to 29 and placed greater emphasis on job quality, digital and green skills, and support for vulnerable groups. In Spain, the reinforced framework is implemented through the Youth Guarantee Plus Plan 2021–2027, which includes measures on career guidance, training, employment opportunities, and entrepreneurship, alongside initiatives aimed at promoting equality of access to employment and improving coordination and monitoring among labour market institutions.

=== Vocational education reform ===
In 2022, Spain adopted a new law establishing an integrated vocational education and training (VET) system. The reform aimed to strengthen links between education and labour market needs and to improve employability throughout working life.

The law unified previously separate vocational training subsystems and introduced a stronger dual training model combining classroom instruction with workplace training in firms. It also expanded the recognition of skills acquired through professional experience and created more flexible training pathways.

An academic analysis interprets this reform as the culmination of a broader policy shift toward a dual VET model in Spain, influenced by European Union recommendations and by policy learning from countries with established dual systems such as Germany and Austria. The 2022 law consolidated these developments by making dual vocational training the standard framework of the Spanish VET system.

== Consequences and effects ==
Youth unemployment affects not only young people, but also the economy on a broader scale, specifically income inequality. As the rate of youth unemployment increased, the gap between the rich and poor in Spain widened. It is estimated that Spain has experienced the widest expansion of income distribution in Europe, as it experienced an increase in income inequality of 18%.

Not finding work has been linked to cause other problems, such as social problems typically linked to youth. The lack of work can lead to a vicious circle of poverty and social problems among young people. On top of that, unemployment can force young people to move away or to start engaging in violence and juvenile delinquency, as well as having low self-esteem and discouragement that can lead to addiction and other health problems in the future. If young people are out of work for too long, they may begin to lose their skills or stop looking for a job altogether - which means that the unemployment rate may not really be indicative of the unemployment picture in Spain.

== Recommendations ==
The measures approved by the Council of Ministers in 2011 to lower the age of participation in the Initial Professional Qualification Programs (PCPI) to 15 years old, the greater accessibility of facilities and the extension of the programs for up to two years should encourage certain students to remain in the education system longer.
