= Effective unemployment rate =

The unemployment rate announced by United States Department of Labor does not include those too discouraged to look for work any longer or those part-time workers who are working fewer hours than they would like. By adding these two groups to the unemployment rate, the rate becomes the effective unemployment rate.

The Bureau of Labor Statistics in the United States keeps an alternative unemployment rate indicator similar to the effective unemployment rate called U6.

== See also ==
- Involuntary unemployment
- Underemployment
