= Cayuco =

Type of canoe

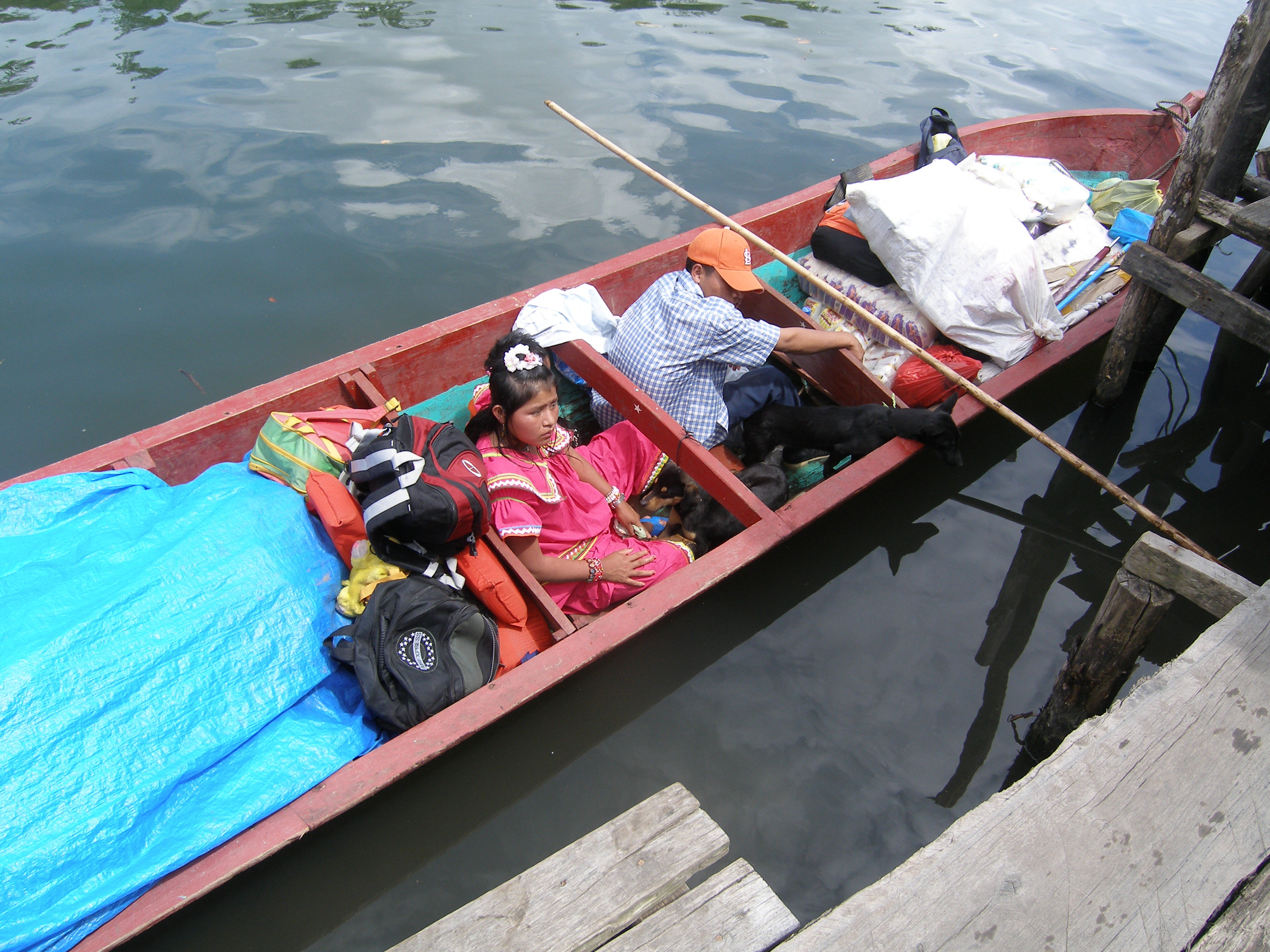
Cayuco in Panama.

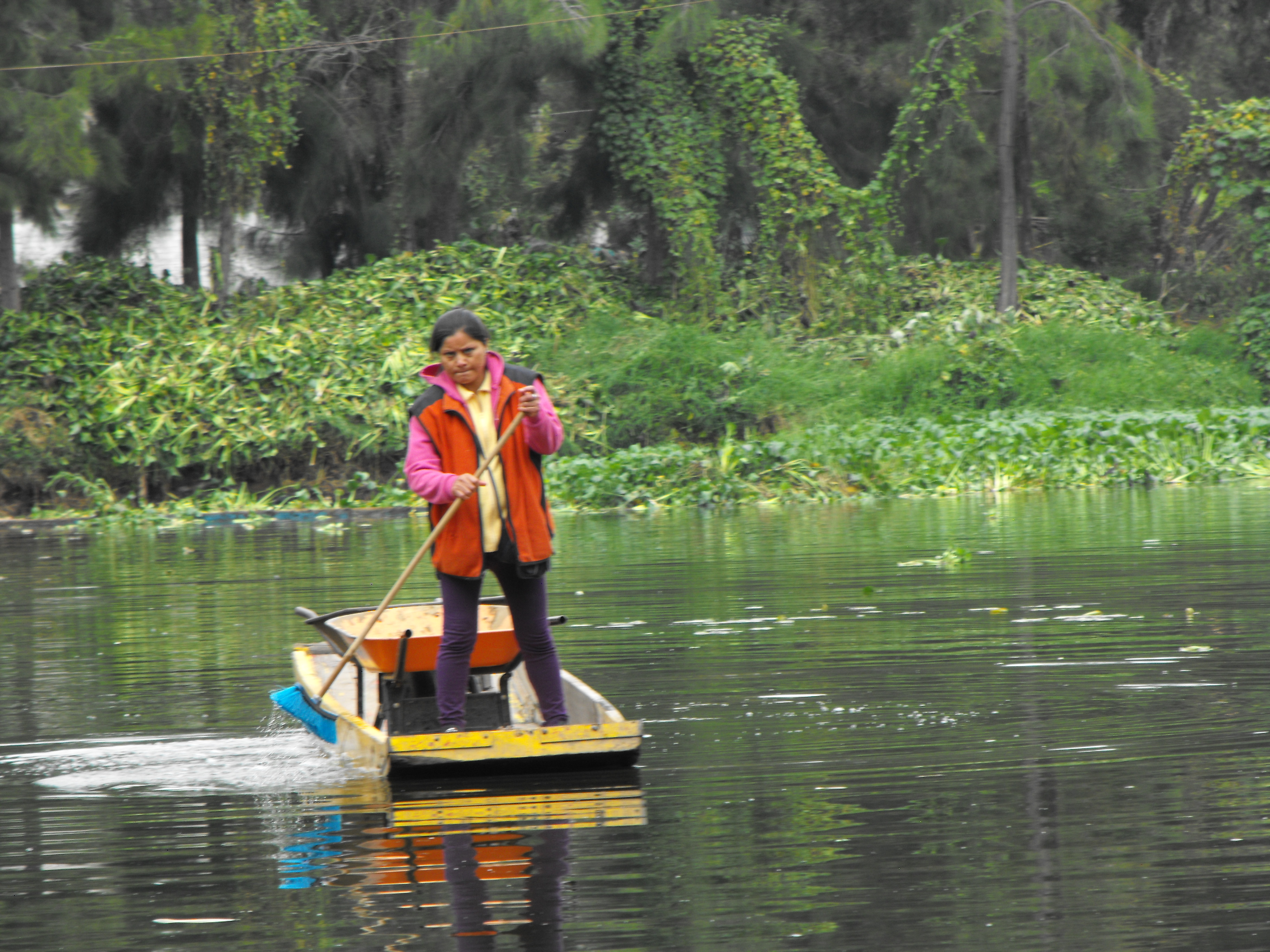
Propelling a Cayuco via broom in Mexico.

Cayuco is a Latin American Spanish term for a small canoe.

== Overview ==
Cayuco racing is the activity of paddling a canoe for the purpose of recreation (also called a float trip), sport, or transportation. It usually refers exclusively to using a paddle to propel a canoe with only human muscle power. A cayuco is propelled using a paddle with one blade where the paddler sits with their legs in front of them, whereas canoes are propelled using single- or double-bladed paddles where the paddler is kneeling or sitting. Cayucos are usually half closed-decked boats with a spraydeck, while canoes are usually open boats.

Cayuco in Puerto Rico is an idiomatic expression for something that is difficult, a situation that is very tough to face or a problem too hard to untangle. It is the equivalent of the phrase "This is a hot mess." In Puerto Rican: "Esto está cayuco."

There are also open cayucos and closed canoes. Technically, a cayuco can be seen as a special kind of canoe. When exactly a canoe can be called cayuco is difficult to determine though, and often arbitrary. Internationally, the term canoeing is used as a generic term for all forms, though the terms paddlesports or canoe/kayak/cayuco are also used.

In North America, however, canoeing usually refers only to canoes, as opposed to both canoes and cayucos. Paddling a cayuco is also referred to as cayuco.

Open canoes may be 'poled' (punted), sailed, 'lined and tracked' (using ropes) or even 'gunnel-bobbed'. In modern canoe sport, both canoes and cayucos may be closed-decked. Other than by the minimum competition specifications (typically length and width (beam) and seating arrangement it is difficult to differentiate most competition canoes from the equivalent competition cayucos.

== The Panamanian cayuco ==
In the Republic of Panama, a cayuco is a vessel carved from the trunk of a tree, used mainly, but not exclusively by the indigenous people of the country. In 1954, these vessels were adopted by the Boy Scouts of America Explorers in the former Panama Canal Zone to make the first Ocean to Ocean Cayuco Race, which goes through the Panama Canal from the Atlantic Ocean to the Pacific Ocean.
