= 2005 Spanish regional elections =

- 17 April 2005; 19 June 2005

150 seats in the regional parliaments of the Basque Country and Galicia
Regional administrations by leading party in 2005
National parties
PP (6+2)
PSOE (6)
Regional parties
PSC (Note: PSOE's sister party in Catalonia.) (1)
EAJ/PNV (1)
CC (1)
UPN (Note: PP's sister party in Navarre.) (1)
PRC (1)

Regional elections were held in Spain during 2005 to elect the regional parliaments of two of the seventeen autonomous communities: the Basque Country and Galicia. 150 of 1,186 seats in the regional parliaments were up for election. The elections were held on 17 April in the Basque Country, and on 19 June in Galicia.

== Election date ==
Determination of election day varied depending on the autonomous community. Typically, most autonomous communities held their elections on the fourth Sunday of May every four years, concurrently with nationwide local elections, while others had their own, separate electoral cycles. In some cases, regional presidents had the prerogative to dissolve parliament and call for extra elections at a different time, but newly elected assemblies were restricted to serving out what remained of their previous four year-terms without altering the period to their next ordinary election. In other cases—Andalusia (since 1994), the Basque Country (1981), Catalonia (1985) and Galicia (1985)—the law granted regional presidents the power to call snap elections resulting in fresh four-year parliamentary terms.

== Regional governments ==
The following table lists party control in autonomous communities and cities. Gains for a party are highlighted in that party's colour.

Election day	Region	Previous control	New control
17 April	Basque Country	Basque Nationalist Party (EAJ/PNV)	Basque Nationalist Party (EAJ/PNV)
19 June	Galicia	People's Party (PP)	Spanish Socialist Workers' Party (PSOE)

== Summary by region ==
=== April (Basque Country) ===
Parties and alliances	Votes	%	±pp	Seats	+/−
PNV–EA	468,117	38.38	−4.00	29	−4
PSE–EE (PSOE)	274,546	22.51	+4.75	18	+5
PP	210,614	17.27	−5.66	15	−4
PCTV/EHAK	150,644	12.35	+2.31	9	+2
EB–B	65,023	5.33	−0.20	3	±0
Aralar	28,180	2.31	New	1	+1
Others	13,474	1.10		0	±0
Blank ballots	9,001	0.74	−0.07		
Valid votes	1,219,599	99.67	+0.10		
Invalid votes	4,035	0.33	−0.10		
Votes cast / turnout	1,223,634	68.00	−10.97		
Registered voters	1,799,523				

=== June (Galicia) ===
Parties and alliances	Votes	%	±pp	Seats	+/−
PP	756,562	45.23	−6.39	37	−4
PSdeG–PSOE	555,603	33.22	+11.39	25	+8
BNG	311,954	18.65	−3.93	13	−4
Others	27,525	1.65		0	±0
Blank ballots	20,912	1.25	−0.44		
Valid votes	1,672,556	99.54	+0.24		
Invalid votes	7,646	0.46	−0.24		
Votes cast / turnout	1,680,202	64.21	+4.05		
Registered voters	2,616,811				

== Bibliography ==
- Ley Orgánica 5/1985, de 19 de junio, del Régimen Electoral General (Organic Law 5/1985). Official State Gazette (in Spanish). 19 June 1985 [version as of 29 November 2003]. BOE-A-1985-11672.
