= 2007 Spanish elections =

2007 Spanish elections may refer to one of two nationwide elections held in Spain on 27 May 2007:

- 2007 Spanish local elections, to elect local seats in Spanish municipalities, provinces and island councils.
- 2007 Spanish regional elections, to elect the regional parliaments of thirteen autonomous communities.
