= Underemployment =

Underutilization of workers' talents or skills in employment

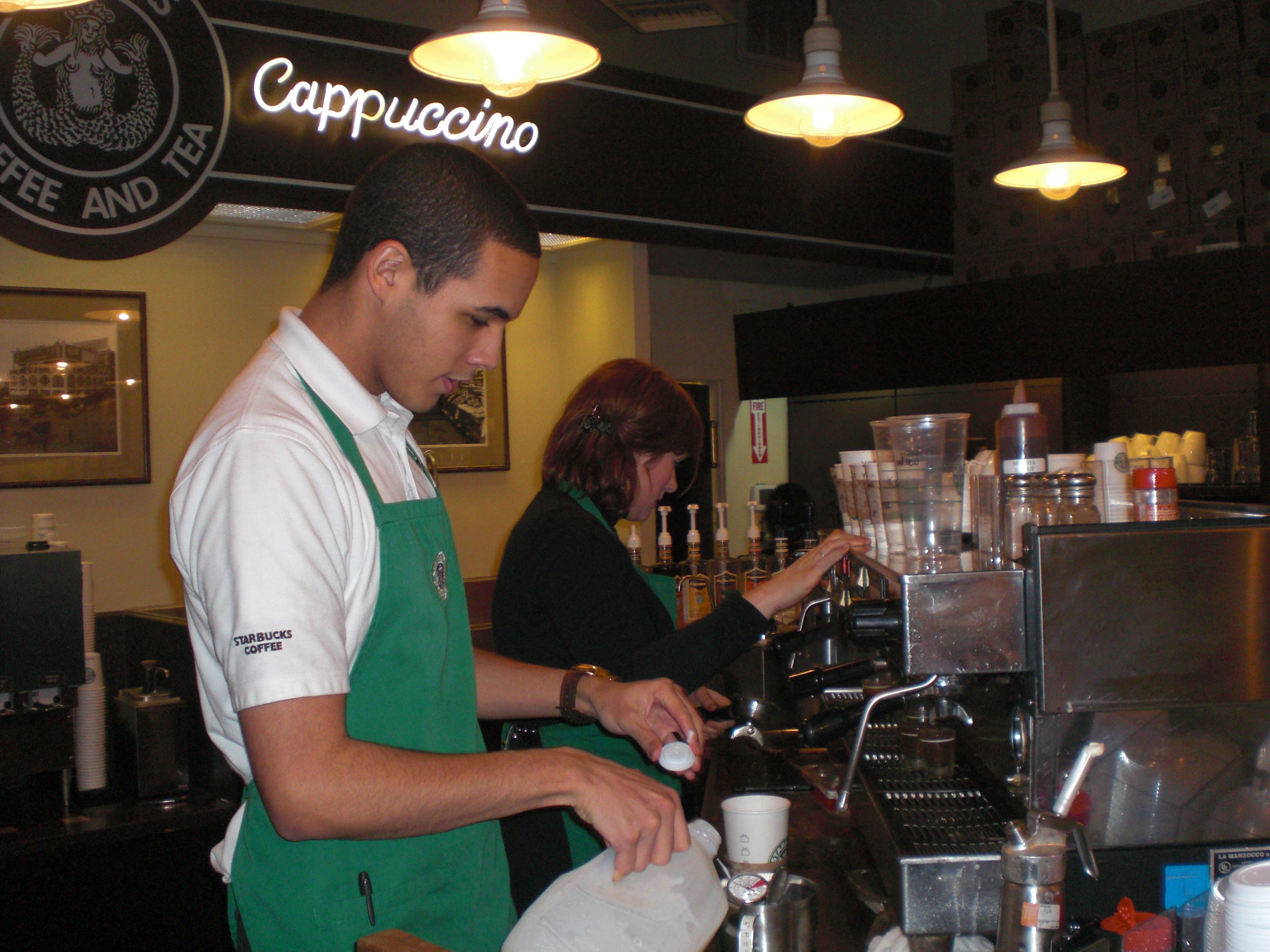
In 2014, university graduates from the U.S. were often unable to find a job requiring a degree; 44% could only find service jobs such as barista positions that do not require postsecondary education.

Underemployment is the underuse of a worker because their job does not use their skills, offers them too few hours, or leaves the worker idle. It is contrasted with unemployment, where a person lacks a job at all despite wanting one.

The International Labour Organization defines time-related underemployment as employment in which a person wants and is available to work additional hours, but works fewer hours across all jobs than a specified threshold.

Examples of workers who may be considered underemployed include those who hold a part-time job but wish to work more hours, part-time workers who wish to work full-time, and overqualified workers who have education, experience, or skills beyond their role's requirements.

Underemployment has been studied from a variety of perspectives, including economics, management, psychology, and sociology.

In economics, underemployment has three different distinct meanings and applications. Policy-makers may under-research these meanings when assessing the economy as they focus on unemployment instead:

1. "Overqualification" or "overeducation", the employment of workers with high education, skill levels, or experience in jobs that do not require such abilities. For example, a trained medical doctor with unrecognized foreign credentials working as a taxi driver.
2. "Under hours" or "involuntary part-time" work, for those who wish to work more hours and/or move from part-time to full-time. By extension, the term is also used in regional planning to describe regions where economic activity rates are unusually low due to a lack of job opportunities, training opportunities, or services like childcare and public transportation.
3. "Overstaffing", "hidden unemployment", or "disguised unemployment" (also called "labor hoarding"), the practice in which businesses or entire economies employ workers who are not fully occupied. For example, workers currently not being used to produce goods or services due to legal or social restrictions or because the work is highly seasonal.

Underemployment is a significant cause of poverty as pay may be insufficient to meet basic needs. It has been associated with OECD wage stagnation. Underemployment is a problem particularly in developing countries, where the unemployment rate is often quite low, as most workers are doing subsistence work or occasional part-time jobs. In 2011, the global average of full-time workers per adult population was only 26%, compared to 30–52% in developed countries and 5–20% in most of Africa. In 2018–2019, the global average rose to 77%, while in low and low-middle income countries, it was around 60–70%. A similar rate was on the high income countries, while on the upper-middle income countries – around 80%.

A Gallup investigation of its surveys in 154 countries from 2017 to 2022 revealed that a median of 20% of men and 27% of women in the workforce were underemployed.

== Underutilization of skills ==
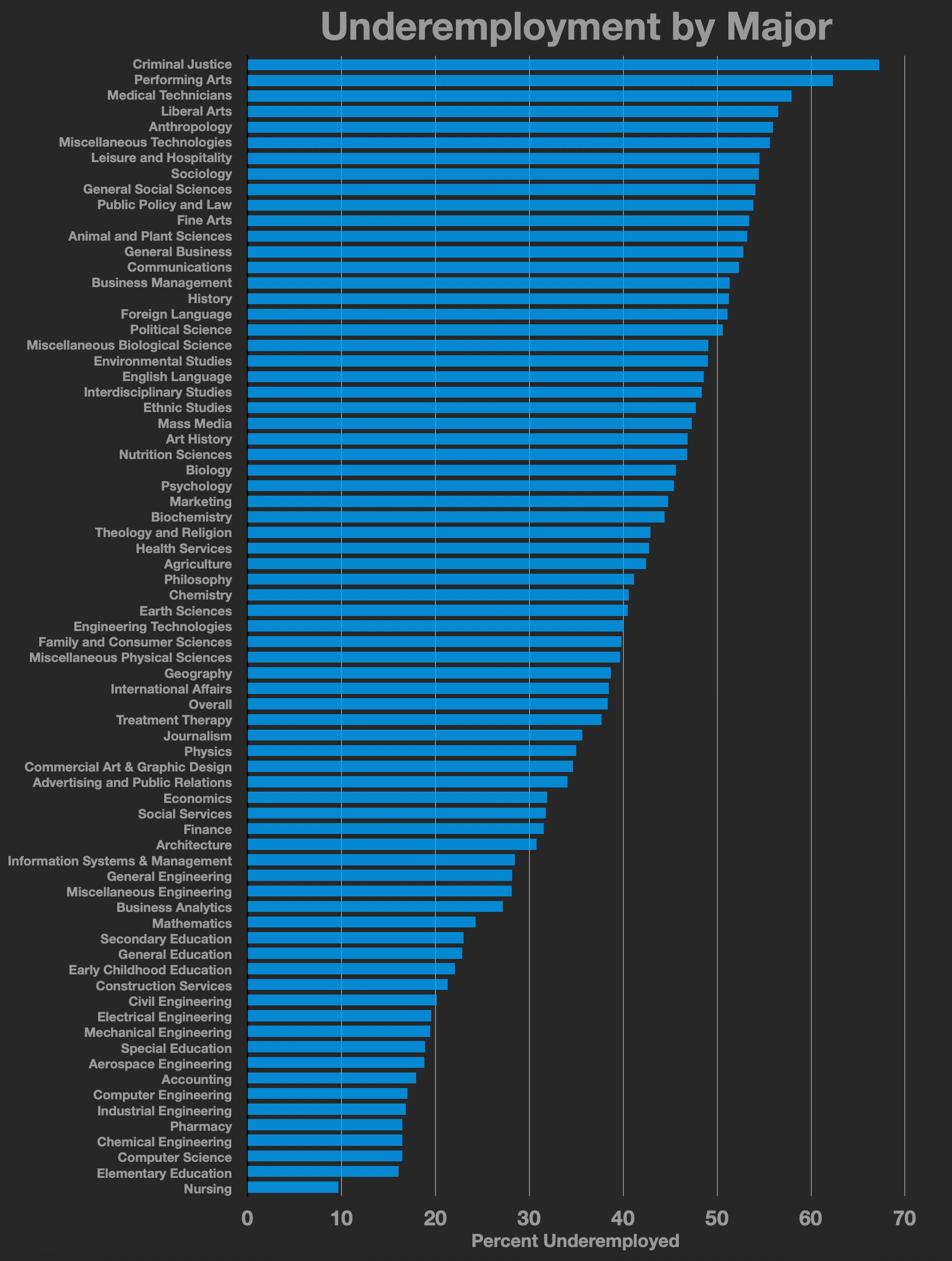
Underemployment by major in 2025

In one usage, underemployment describes the employment of workers with high skill levels and postsecondary education who are working in relatively low-skilled, low-wage jobs. For example, someone with a college degree may be a bartender, or working as a factory assembly line worker. That may result from the existence of unemployment, which makes workers with bills to pay (and responsibilities) take almost any jobs available, even if they do not use their full talents. That can also occur with individuals who are being discriminated against, lack appropriate trade certification or academic degrees (such as a high school or college diploma), have disabilities or mental illnesses, or have served time in prison.

Two common situations that can lead to underemployment are immigrants and new graduates. When highly trained immigrants arrive in a country, their foreign credentials may not be recognized or accepted in their new country, or they may have to do a lengthy or costly re-credentialing process. As a result, when doctors or engineers from other countries immigrate, they may be unable to work in their profession, and they may have to seek menial work. New graduates may also face underemployment because even though they have completed the technical training for a given field for which there is a good job market, they lack experience. Recent graduates with a master's degree in accounting or business administration may have to work in a low-paid job as a barista or store clerk, which does not require a university degree, until they are able to find work in their professional field.

Another example of underemployment is someone who holds high skills for which there is low market-place demand. While it is costly in terms of money and time to acquire academic credentials, many types of degrees, particularly those in the liberal arts, produce significantly more graduates than can be properly employed. Employers have responded to the oversupply of graduates by raising the academic requirements of many occupations higher than is really necessary to perform the work. A number of surveys show that skill-based underemployment in North America and Europe can be a long-lasting phenomenon. If university graduates remain in a prolonged state of underemployment, the skills they gained from their degrees can atrophy from disuse or become out of date. For example, a person who graduates with a PhD in English literature has advanced research and writing skills when they graduate, but if they work as a store clerk for a number of years, these skills may atrophy from disuse. Similarly, technically specialized workers may find themselves unable to acquire positions commensurate with their skills for extended lengths of time following layoffs. Skilled machinists who are laid off may find that they cannot find another job as a machinist and so they may work as a server in a restaurant, a job which does not use their professional skills.

As the tertiary education of most students in Western countries is fully or partially subsidized by government monies (because it takes place at a state university or public university or because the student receives government loans or grants), the underemployment of recent college graduates may also be an ineffective use of public resources. Several solutions have been proposed to reduce skill-based underemployment: for example, government-imposed restrictions on public university enrollment in degree fields with a very low labor market demand (e.g. fine arts), or changes in degree cost model that reflect potential labour market demand.

A related kind of underemployment refers to "involuntary part-time" workers, who could (and would like to) be working on a standard work-week (typically full-time employment means 40 hours per week in the United States) schedule but can find only part-time work. Underemployment is more prevalent during times of economic stagnation (during recessions or depressions) and when financial pressures increase. During the Great Depression of the 1930s, many of those who were employed were underemployed. Those kinds of underemployment arise because labor markets typically do not "clear" using wage adjustment. Instead, there is a non-wage rationing of jobs.

Involuntary part time workers, share of total employment (OECD)

== Underuse of economic capacity ==
Underemployment can also be used in regional planning to describe localities where economic activity rates are unusually low. This can be induced by a lack of job opportunities, training opportunities, or services such as childcare and public transportation. Such difficulties may lead residents to accept economic inactivity rather than register as unemployed or actively seek jobs because their prospects for regular employment appear so bleak. (These people are often called discouraged workers and are not counted officially as being "unemployed.") The tendency to get by without work (to exit the labor force, living off relatives, friends, personal savings, or non-recorded economic activities) can be aggravated if it is made difficult to obtain unemployment benefits.

Relatedly, in macroeconomics, "underemployment" simply refers to excess unemployment, i.e., high unemployment relative to full employment or the natural rate of unemployment, also called the NAIRU. Thus, in Keynesian economics, reference is made to underemployment equilibrium. Economists calculate the cyclically-adjusted full employment unemployment rate, e.g. 4% or 6% unemployment, which in a given context is regarded as "normal" and acceptable. Sometimes, this rate is equated with the NAIRU. The difference between the observed unemployment rate and cyclically adjusted full employment unemployment rate is one measure of the societal level of underemployment. By Okun's Law, it is correlated with the gap between potential output and the actual real GDP. This "GDP gap" and the degree of underemployment of labor would be larger if they incorporated the roles of underemployed labor, involuntary part-time labor, and discouraged workers.

== Underuse of employed workers ==
The third definition of "underemployment" describes a polar opposite phenomenon: to some economists, the term refers to "overstaffing" or "hidden unemployment," the practice of businesses or entire economies employing workers who are not fully occupied (in other words, employees who are not economically productive, or underproductive, or economically inefficient). This may be because of legal or social restrictions on firing and lay-offs (e.g. union rules requiring managers to make a case to fire a worker or spend time and money fighting the union) or because they are overhead workers, or because the work is highly seasonal (which is the case in accounting firms focusing on tax preparation, as well as agriculture and the hospitality industry). The presence of this issue in white collar office jobs is described in the boreout phenomenon, which posits that the major issue facing office workers is lack of work and boredom.

This kind of underemployment does not refer to the kind of non-work time done by, for instance, firefighters or lifeguards, who spend a lot of their time waiting and watching for emergency or rescue work to do; this kind of activity is necessary in case there are multiple simultaneous incidents.

This kind of underemployment may exist for structural or cyclical reasons. In many economies, some firms become insulated from fierce competitive pressures and grow inefficient, because they are awarded a government monopoly (e.g., telephone or electrical utilities) or due to a situation of abuse of market power (e.g., holding a monopoly position in a certain industry). As such, if they may employ more workers than necessary, they might not be getting the market signals that would pressure them to reduce their labour force, and they may end up carrying the resultant excess costs and depressed profits.

In some countries, labour laws or practices (e.g. powerful unions) may force employers to retain excess employees. Other countries (e.g. Japan) often have significant cultural influences (the relatively great importance attached to worker solidarity as opposed to shareholder rights) that result in a reluctance to shed labour in times of difficulty. In Japan, there is a long-held tradition that if a worker commits to serve a company with long and loyal service, the company will, in return, keep the worker on the payroll even during economic downturns. In centrally-planned economies, layoffs were often not allowed so that some state-run companies would have periods when they had more workers than they needed to complete the organization's tasks.

Structural underemployment is especially relevant in developing and emerging market economies. In these countries, workers may be employed but not used to their full potential because of labour market distortions. These distortions often stem from institutional factors like restrictions on household registration, dualistic labour markets and reliance on informal insurance within rural communities. Such imperfections act as barriers to labour mobility, thus hindering the efficient allocation of workers across industries and firms. As a result, many workers remain trapped in low-productivity jobs instead of moving to sectors where their productivity would be higher. This misallocation reduces overall economic efficiency. Estimates suggest that, in major emerging markets, these labour market distortions may lower potential output by 5–15%, reflecting the underutilisation of workers who are already employed.

Cyclical underemployment refers to the tendency for the capacity utilization of firms (and therefore of their demand for labor) to be lower at times of recession or economic depression. At such times, underemployment of workers may be tolerated and indeed may be wise business policy, given the financial cost and the reduction of morale from shedding and then rehiring staff. Alternatively, paying underused overhead workers is seen as an investment in their future contributions to production. This kind of underemployment has been given as a possible reason why Airbus gained market share from Boeing. Unlike Airbus, which had more flexibility, Boeing was unable to ramp up production fast enough when prosperous times returned because it had dismissed a great part of its personnel in lean times.

Another example is the tourism sector, which faces cyclical demand in areas where attractions are weather-related. In some tourism sectors, such as the sun and sand tours operated by Club Med, the company can shed bartenders, lifeguards, sports instructors, and other staff in the off-season because there is such a strong demand for young people to work for the company since its glamorous beachfront properties are desirable places to work. However, not all tourism sectors find it so easy to recruit staff. Some tourism sectors require workers with unusual or hard-to-find skills. Northern Ontario hunting and fishing camps that require skilled guides may have an incentive to retain their staff in the off-season. Another example is companies that run tours for foreign tourists using staff speaking the travelers' native tongue. In Canada, guided tours are available for Japanese and German tourists in their native languages; in some locations, it may be hard for companies to find Japanese- or German-speaking staff and so companies may retain their staff in the off-season.

== See also ==
- Unemployment
- Credentialism and educational inflation
- Dead-end job
- Discouraged worker
- Effective unemployment rate
- Job guarantee
- Labor force
- Overqualification
- Tang ping ("lying flat")
- Underearners Anonymous
- Working poor
- Zero hours contract
