= Law of Equality (Spain) =

2007 Spanish gender equality legislation

On March 24, 2007, the Spanish parliament passed the Law of Equality Act, or 'Gender Equality Act' (Ley de Igualdad). The government of Prime Minister Jose Luis Rodriguez Zapatero proposed the bill in an effort to improve gender balance in elected political office and at board level in companies.

With some small towns excepted, the law requires political parties to field female candidates in at least 40% of the seats they contest. The law also grants 15 days of paternity leave to new fathers.

The April 2019 Spanish general election resulted in women comprising 47% of elected members of parliament.
