= Constitutional Court ruling on the 2006 Catalan Statute of Autonomy =

2010 Spanish Constitutional Court ruling on Catalonia's autonomy statute

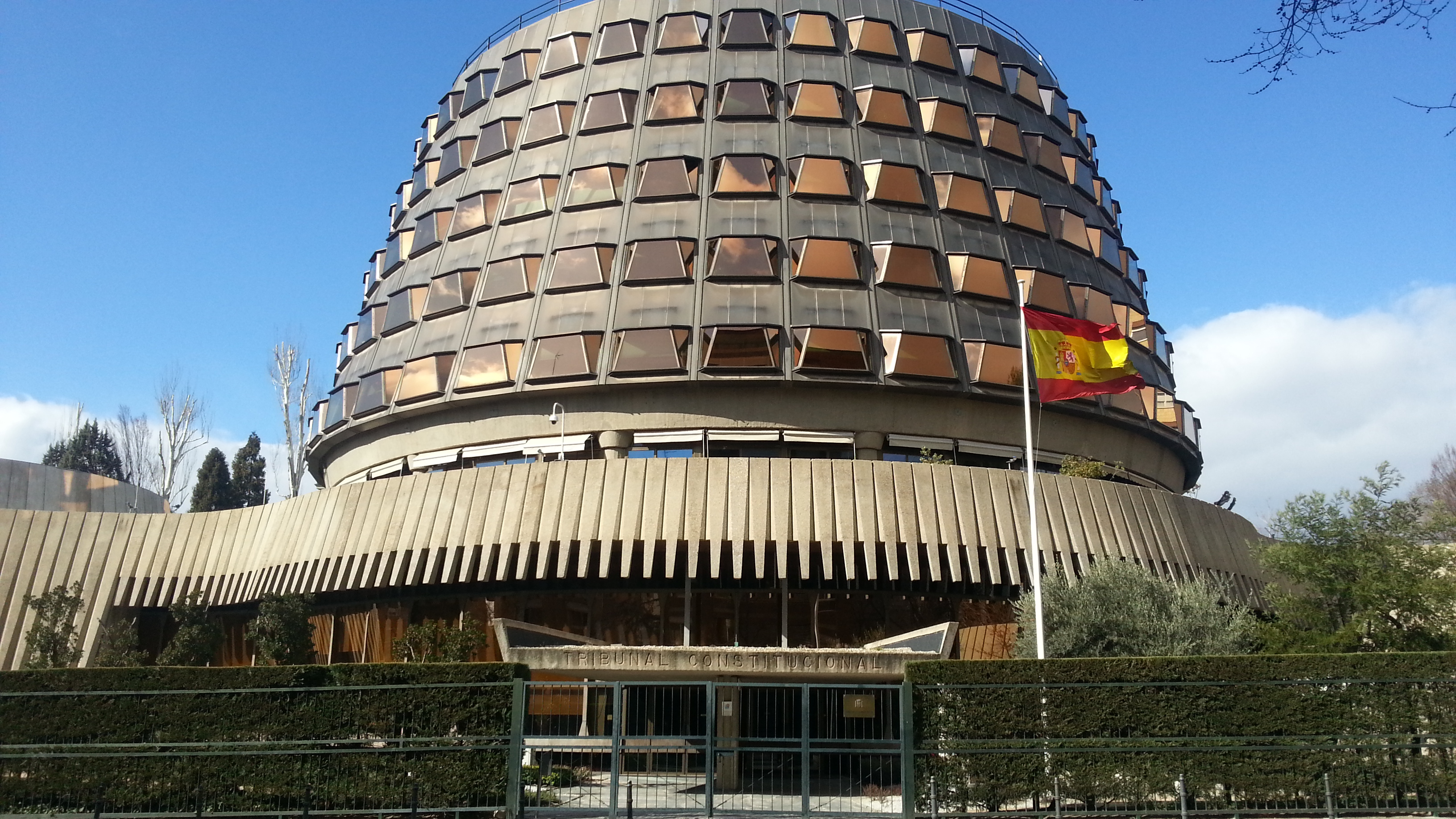
Headquarters of the Constitutional Court in Madrid

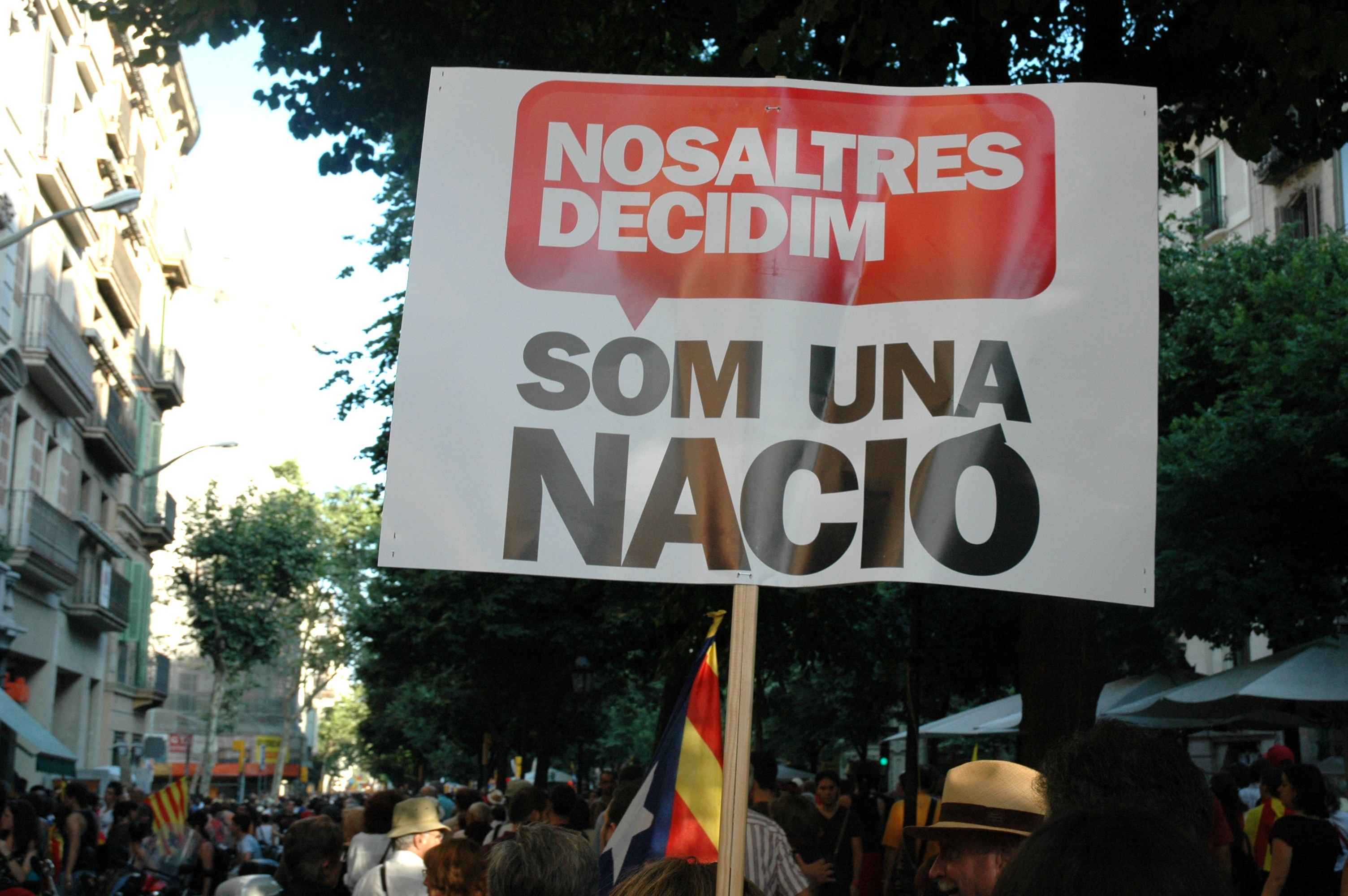
Slogan of the "Som una nació. Nosaltres decidim" demonstration.

The 31/2010 ruling of the Constitutional Court of Spain on the 2006 Statute of Autonomy of Catalonia was made public on June 28, 2010, four years after the appeal of unconstitutionality filed by the People's Party on July 31, 2006, against 114 of the 223 articles of the Statute of Autonomy of Catalonia of 2006, which had been ratified by Catalans in the referendum held on June 18, 2006. The Constitutional Court, by eight votes to two, declared 14 articles unconstitutional and subjected another 27 to the court's interpretation (by six votes to four). The court also ruled that the references made in the Statute's preamble to Catalonia as a nation and to the national reality of Catalonia "lack legal effect." The court's president, María Emilia Casas, acted as rapporteur. The full text of the ruling and the five dissenting opinions accompanying it became known on July 9, 2010, one day before the demonstration in Barcelona rejecting the ruling, held under the slogan "Som una nació. Nosaltres decidim" ('We are a nation. We decide').

== Background ==
On September 30, 2005, the Parliament of Catalonia approved the reform of the Statute of Autonomy of Catalonia of 1979, which introduced so many changes that it was in effect a new Statute. All Catalan political groups supported it except the People's Party of Catalonia. In November it was brought before the Congress of Deputies for approval, as required by the Spanish Constitution of 1978, but there it underwent numerous changes that led Republican Left of Catalonia, one of the parties promoting the new Statute and then part of the "tripartite" government of the Generalitat of Catalonia led by socialist Pasqual Maragall, to ultimately withdraw its support, while the People's Party continued to oppose it.

The new statute, already approved in Congress, was finally put to a referendum in Catalonia on June 18, 2006, and approved by 74% of voters, with a turnout of 49%. A month and a half later, on July 31, the People's Party filed an appeal of unconstitutionality before the Constitutional Court, challenging 128 of the Statute's 223 articles. This appeal was followed by six others filed by the Ombudsman and by five autonomous communities (Aragón, the Balearic Islands, the Valencian Community, Murcia, and La Rioja), all governed by the People's Party except Aragón, which was governed by a coalition between the Socialist Party of Aragón and the Aragonese Party.

Three days before filing the appeal before the Constitutional Court, Mariano Rajoy had listed the eight main elements of unconstitutionality that the PP saw in the Statute:

- that Catalonia be considered a nation, since "from a constitutional standpoint, there is no nation other than the Spanish nation, the holder of sovereignty," and that nation "cannot be equated with the nationalities and regions that make up its indissoluble unity" and whose statutes are "a power derived from the Constitution";
- the "privileged" treatment given to the Catalan language stemming from treating knowledge of it as a duty and from "the exclusive consideration of Catalan as the language of instruction," which, moreover, runs counter to "parents' right to choose the language in which they want their children to be educated";
- the existence of "different rights and duties" for Catalans than for the rest of Spaniards, because this "runs counter to the equality of all Spaniards";
- Judicial Power for Catalonia, because it "breaks with the judicial unity of Spain";
- the distribution of powers between Catalonia and the State;
- the principle of bilaterality "which privileges Catalonia and lays the groundwork for an asymmetric confederal model" and entails "an inequality inadmissible under the Constitution";
- Catalonia's international relations, and
- its own financing system when this should be agreed upon among all the autonomous communities.

The critical reactions of the Catalan parties to the PP's filing of the appeal were immediate. The PSC accused the People's Party of acting with "disrespect toward Catalans" who had approved the new Statute in a referendum, and of "belittling" the idea of a "plural Spain." ERC, for its part, warned that if the Constitutional Court upheld the appeal, the new Statute "will fall even further short of meeting Catalonia's needs and will show that another constitutional framework respecting our rights is needed." CiU described the PP's initiative as an "aggression against Catalonia," although it acknowledged it was a "legitimate and respectable" decision, while ICV predicted the People's Party would fail in the upcoming Catalan elections.

On November 5, 2006, the elections to the Parliament of Catalonia were held, with results very similar to those of 2003. CiU was again the most-voted party (winning 48 seats, two more than in 2003), but the PSC, ERC, and ICV-EUiA retained an absolute majority (37 seats for the PSC, 21 for ERC, and 12 for ICV-EUiA), allowing them to renew the "tripartite" government under the presidency of socialist José Montilla, with pro-independence republican Josep Lluís Carod Rovira as vice president. The only novelty was the entry into the Catalan Parliament, with three deputies, of the new party Ciudadanos – Partido de la Ciudadanía, which, like the PP (14 deputies), was firmly opposed to the new Statute. On November 24, José Montilla — the new PSC leader after Maragall, under pressure from his own party, declined to run for re-election — was invested by the Parliament of Catalonia as the new president of the Generalitat by 70 votes in favor and 65 against. In the speech that followed, Montilla offered the opposition (CiU, PP, and Ciudadanos) a pact to develop the Statute and other major "national" issues.

== Processing of the appeal ==
Almost immediately after the appeals of unconstitutionality were filed with the Constitutional Court, a wave of cross-recusals began that froze the proceedings and extended the process for four years. The Court was made up of six "conservative" justices and six "progressive" justices, although since the court's president, María Emilia Casas, was among the latter, this gave them the advantage through her casting vote in the event of a tie. It began with the Generalitat of Catalonia, which failed in its attempt to have "conservative" judge Roberto García-Calvo recused. The People's Party responded with a recusal of "progressive" (and Catalan) judge Pablo Pérez Tremps, which was upheld, leaving the court with a "conservative" majority of six to five.

In March 2007, the Catalan government managed to have Pérez Tremps's recusal apply only to the PP's appeal and not to the other six, and two months later the government of José Luis Rodríguez Zapatero brought before the Congress of Deputies, through the urgent procedure, a reform of the Organic Law of the Constitutional Court to extend the president's term, which was due to expire in June, and thus preserve the casting vote on the "progressive" side. The People's Party responded with an appeal and by blocking the Senate's renewal of the four justices whose terms ended in December, thereby securing the "conservative" majority on the Court (since three of them belonged to that camp). The socialist government of Rodríguez Zapatero, for its part, considered seeking the recusal of "conservative" justices García-Calvo and Rodríguez-Zapata.

After the March 2008 elections, which again gave victory to the PSOE, keeping Rodríguez Zapatero at the head of the government, the Senate continued to block the election of the four justices whose terms had already expired. On May 18, "conservative" justice García-Calvo died, but his seat was not filled due to a lack of agreement between the PP and the PSOE, which restored the balance between "conservatives" and "progressives" (five to five), though the latter retained the advantage of the president's casting vote.

Over the following two years, deliberations on the ruling dragged on due to the division between "conservatives" and "progressives," with its legitimacy questioned in some quarters, since two-thirds of the justices had already completed their terms. Finally, after the court's president took charge of drafting the opinion, an agreement was reached by six votes to four (the five "progressives" plus "conservative" justice Guillermo Jiménez Sánchez, against the other four "conservatives"), made public on June 28, 2010. It declared 14 articles and additional provisions unconstitutional and subjected another 27 to interpretation, in addition to denying any legal validity to the declaration of Catalonia as a nation made in the Preamble.

== Content ==
The ruling runs to 881 pages: 449 of background, 234 of legal grounds, three of the operative decision, and 197 corresponding to the dissenting opinions of five justices.

=== Preamble "without legal effect" ===
The Statute's Preamble states "that the Parliament of Catalonia, reflecting the sentiment and will of the citizens of Catalonia, has by a broad majority defined Catalonia as a nation." The Constitutional Court held that this statement, together with the mention of the "national reality of Catalonia," lacks "interpretive legal effect," the only nature that preambles or statements of purpose possess, being wholly devoid of normative value and therefore not subject to being declared unconstitutional. The ruling states and adopts verbatim "the defense of ideological conceptions which, based on a particular understanding of social, cultural and political reality, seek for a given community the status of national community, even as a principle from which to seek the formation of a constitutionally legitimated will to, through the appropriate and unavoidable reform of the Constitution, translate that understanding into a legal reality." Thus, "this mention, moreover, insofar as it is the expression of a historical circumstance, is in itself legally inconsequential, without prejudice to the fact that, in any context other than the legal-constitutional one, a community's self-representation as a national reality in the ideological, historical, or cultural sense has full standing in a democratic legal order as the expression of a perfectly legitimate idea." Legal ground No. 12 of the ruling states: "the nation that matters here is solely and exclusively the nation in the legal-constitutional sense. And in that specific sense the Constitution recognizes no other than the Spanish Nation, with whose mention its preamble begins, on which the Constitution is founded (Art. 2 CE), and which expressly qualifies the sovereignty which, exercised by the Spanish people as its sole recognized holder (Art. 1.2), has manifested itself as constituent will in the positive provisions of the Spanish Constitution."

=== Articles declared wholly or partly unconstitutional ===
The fourteen articles that the Constitutional Court declared wholly or partly unconstitutional, by six votes to four, are as follows (in bold the passages struck down as contrary to the Constitution):

Article 6.1.
The language of Catalonia is Catalan. As such, Catalan is the language normally used and preferentially by public administrations and public media in Catalonia, and it is also the language normally used as the medium of instruction and learning in education.
Legal ground
Considering Catalan as the "language of Catalonia" should not entail an imbalance in the co-official status regime. Declaring preferences "implies the primacy of one language over another."

Article 76.4.
The opinions of the Council of Statutory Guarantees are binding with respect to bills and proposed laws of the Parliament that develop or affect rights recognized by this Statute.
Legal ground
The binding nature of the Council of Statutory Guarantees' opinions would constitute "an inadmissible limitation of parliamentary authority and powers" and would prejudice "the monopoly on rejecting rules with the force of law" held by the Constitutional Court.

Article 78.1.
The Síndic de Greuges has the function of protecting and defending the rights and freedoms recognized by the Constitution and this Statute. To that end it oversees, exclusively, the activity of the Generalitat's Administration (...).
Legal ground
The phrase "exclusively" violates Article 54 of the Constitution by making "the Ombudsman's action regarding the Catalan Administration impossible. The Ombudsman's action "must extend to any public administrations in order to fully cover the constitutional guarantees of rights."

Article 95. The High Court of Justice of Catalonia.

5. The President of the High Court of Justice of Catalonia is the representative of judicial power in Catalonia. He or she is appointed by the King, on the proposal of the General Council of the Judiciary and with the participation of the Council of Justice of Catalonia under the terms established by the Organic Law of the Judiciary. The President of the Generalitat orders publication of the appointment in the Diari Oficial de la Generalitat de Catalunya.
6. The Presiding Judges of the Chambers of the High Court of Justice of Catalonia are appointed on the proposal of the General Council of the Judiciary and with the participation of the Council of Justice of Catalonia under the terms established by the Organic Law of the Judiciary.

Article 97. The Council of Justice of Catalonia.
The Council of Justice of Catalonia is the governing body of judicial power in Catalonia. It acts as a decentralized body of the General Council of the Judiciary, without prejudice to the latter's powers, in accordance with the provisions of the Organic Law of the Judiciary.

Article 98. Powers.
a) To participate in the appointment of the President of the High Court of Justice of Catalonia, as well as in that of the Presiding Judges of the Chambers of said High Court and of the Presidents of the Provincial Courts.
b) To propose to the General Council of the Judiciary, and to issue, appointments and dismissals of Judges and Magistrates temporarily incorporated into the judicial career with assistance, support, or substitution functions, as well as to determine the assignment of these Judges and Magistrates to judicial bodies requiring reinforcement.
c) To conduct proceedings and, in general, to exercise disciplinary functions over Judges and Magistrates under the terms provided by law.
d) To participate in the planning of inspections of courts and tribunals, to order, where appropriate, their inspection and oversight and to make proposals in this area, to attend to inspection orders for courts and tribunals requested by the Government, and to report on the resolution and measures adopted.
e) To issue opinions on appeals filed against the resolutions of the governing bodies of Catalonia's courts and tribunals.
3. Resolutions of the Council of Justice of Catalonia regarding appointments, authorizations, leaves, and permits must be adopted in accordance with the criteria approved by the General Council of the Judiciary.

Article 99. Composition, organization, and functioning.
1. The Council of Justice of Catalonia is composed of the President of the High Court of Justice of Catalonia, who chairs it, and of members appointed, in accordance with the provisions of the Organic Law of the Judiciary, from among Judges, Magistrates, Prosecutors, or jurists of recognized standing. The Parliament of Catalonia designates the members of the Council as determined by the Organic Law of the Judiciary.

Article 100. Review of acts of the Council of Justice of Catalonia.
1. Acts of the Council of Justice of Catalonia shall be subject to appeal before the General Council of the Judiciary, unless they were issued in the exercise of powers of the Autonomous Community.

Article 101. Competitive examinations and selection processes.
1. The Generalitat proposes to the State Government, to the General Council of the Judiciary, or to the Council of Justice of Catalonia, as appropriate, the calling of competitive examinations and selection processes to fill vacancies for Magistrates, Judges, and Prosecutors in Catalonia.

2. The Council of Justice of Catalonia calls competitions to fill vacancies for Judges and Magistrates in Catalonia under the terms established in the Organic Law of the Judiciary.
Legal ground
"It is notorious that the Catalan Statute incurs an evident excess [by creating the Council of Justice of Catalonia], since no body other than the General Council of the Judiciary may exercise the governing function over the judicial bodies that form part of the Judiciary, which is exclusive to the State, nor can any law other than the Organic Law of the Judiciary determine the structure and functions of that Council."

Article 111. Shared powers.
In matters that the Statute attributes to the Generalitat jointly with the State, the Generalitat holds legislative power, regulatory power, and executive functions, within the framework of the basic principles established by the State as principles or a minimum common normative standard in rules with the rank of law, except in cases determined in accordance with the Constitution and this Statute. In exercising these powers, the Generalitat may establish its own policies. The Parliament must develop and specify these basic provisions through a law.
Legal ground
The State may continue legislating on shared powers through whatever normative instrument it deems appropriate, since "regulatory rules" and "acts of execution by the State" also have a "basic character." Whether the basic principles are "principles" or a "minimum standard" is not a matter to be settled in a Statute, but only in the Constitution. Moreover, "the concept, content, and scope of basic principles cannot, as a general rule, differ for each community, since otherwise the State would have to enact one type of basic principles or another depending on what is provided in each statute of autonomy."

Article 120.2. Savings banks.
The Generalitat holds, with respect to savings banks domiciled in Catalonia, shared authority over financial activity, in accordance with the minimum principles, rules, and standards established by the State's basic legislation, which includes, in any case, regulation of the distribution of surpluses and the social welfare programs of savings banks.

Article 126.2. Credit, banking, insurance, and mutual societies not integrated into the Social Security system.
The Generalitat holds shared authority over the structure, organization, and functioning of credit institutions other than savings banks, credit cooperatives, and management entities of pension plans and funds, and of natural and legal persons operating in the insurance market not referred to in section 1, in accordance with the minimum principles, rules, and standards fixed in the State's basic legislation.

Article 206.3. Participation in the yield of State taxes and equalization and solidarity mechanisms.
The financial resources available to the Generalitat may be adjusted so that the State financing system has sufficient resources to guarantee equalization and solidarity for the other autonomous communities, so that education, health, and other essential welfare-state services provided by the various regional governments can reach similar levels across the State as a whole, provided they also make a similarly comparable fiscal effort. Likewise, and where applicable, the Generalitat shall receive resources from the equalization and solidarity mechanisms. Those levels shall be set by the State.
Legal ground
Only the State may establish the fiscal effort each community must make, so this clause infringes upon the "financial autonomy" of the other autonomous communities.

Article 218.2. Financial autonomy and powers.
The Generalitat has authority, within the framework established by the Constitution and State regulations, over local financing. This authority may include the legislative capacity to establish and regulate taxes of local governments and includes the capacity to set the criteria for distributing the shares charged to the Generalitat's budget.
Legal ground
The "legislative capacity to establish and regulate taxes of local governments" is an "exclusive and exclusionary" power of the State.

=== Articles subject to the Court's interpretation ===
The Constitutional Court upheld the constitutionality of 23 articles and four provisions provided they are interpreted in the manner it indicated:

Art. 5. Historical rights.
"Catalonia's self-government is also based on the historical rights of the Catalan people, on its age-old institutions, and on Catalan legal tradition"
Interpretation
This clause is not equivalent to the content of the first additional provision of the Constitution, nor does it provide a legal basis for Catalonia's self-government other than the Constitution. Thus, "historical rights" can under no circumstances be interpreted as "the basis for the existence" of the Catalan autonomous community or "of its constitutional right to self-government... apart from the Constitution itself."

Art. 6.2 The language of Catalonia and the official languages.
"Catalan is the official language of Catalonia. So is Castilian, which is the official language of the Spanish State. All persons have the right to use both official languages, and citizens of Catalonia have the right and the duty to know them. The public authorities of Catalonia must establish the measures necessary to facilitate the exercise of these rights and the fulfillment of this duty."
Interpretation
"The duty to know the Catalan language cannot be understood as a legally enforceable obligation of a general character."

Art. 8.1. Symbols of Catalonia.
"Catalonia, defined as a nationality in Article 1, has as its national symbols the flag, the festival, and the anthem"
Interpretation
The designation of Catalonia's symbols as "national" is understood solely as the symbols of a "nationality," "without any intent, therefore, to compete or conflict with the symbols of the Spanish Nation."

Art. 33.5. Linguistic rights before public administrations and State institutions.
Citizens of Catalonia have the right to communicate in writing in Catalan with constitutional bodies and with judicial bodies of statewide scope, in accordance with the procedure established by the relevant legislation. These institutions must attend to and process submissions filed in Catalan, which will in all cases have full legal effect.
Interpretation
This provision "would be contrary to the Constitution if the Statute sought to derive from the co-official status of Catalan its quality as a legally valid means of communication with respect to public authorities not based in the territory of the Autonomous Community of Catalonia. Such a condition is exclusive to Castilian. [...] The existence or non-existence of legal effect of submissions filed in Catalan to said bodies, and, where applicable, the degree thereof, must be freely established, within constitutional limits (Art. 3.1 CE), by the competent State legislator."

Art. 34. Linguistic rights of consumers.
"All persons have the right to be attended orally and in writing in the official language of their choice as users or consumers of goods, products, and services. Entities, businesses, and establishments open to the public in Catalonia are subject to a duty of linguistic availability under the terms established by law".
Interpretation
The duty of linguistic availability of entities, businesses, etc., "cannot mean the imposition on them, their owners, or their staff of individual obligations."

Art. 35. Linguistic rights in education.
"Catalan must normally be used as the medium of instruction and learning in education".
Interpretation
"It is not legitimate to interpret" this to mean that instruction be given "solely and exclusively in one of the two co-official languages." "It is constitutionally required that both co-official languages be recognized... as media of instruction."

Art. 50.5. Promotion and dissemination of Catalan.
"The Generalitat, local government, and other public corporations of Catalonia, the institutions and companies dependent on them, and the concessionaires of their services must use Catalan in their internal actions and in relations among themselves (...)".
Interpretation
The duty to use Catalan does not entail a prohibition on the use of Castilian by public and private entities and their staff in internal and external relations, and such normal use of Castilian may not be subject to any formality whatsoever.

Article 90. The vegueria.
1. The vegueria is the specific territorial scope for the exercise of inter-municipal cooperative local government and has its own legal personality. The vegueria is also the territorial division adopted by the Generalitat for the territorial organization of its services. 2. The vegueria, as a local government, has a territorial nature and enjoys autonomy in managing its interests.
Interpretation
"As a matter of principle, it must be noted that the fact that the Statute of Autonomy makes no mention of the province, except in its Art. 91.4 EAC, cannot in any way entail the disappearance of that local entity in Catalonia. The province is an entity assumed and guaranteed in its existence by the Constitution. [...] In this sense, the Statute's provision for the existence of vegueries, whatever their geographic boundaries, cannot entail the abolition of the provinces in Catalonia nor of their constitutional functions.

Article 91. Vegueria council.
3. Vegueria councils replace the provincial councils (Diputaciones). 4. The creation, modification, and abolition, as well as the development of the legal regime, of vegueries are regulated by a law of the Parliament. Any alteration of provincial boundaries shall be carried out in accordance with Article 141.1 of the Constitution.
Interpretation
"If the vegueria is a newly created local entity, it would not be constitutionally admissible for vegueria councils to replace the provincial councils; therefore, Art. 91.3 EAC, in order to conform with the Constitution, must be interpreted conditionally, that is, that vegueria councils may replace the provincial councils only in the specific case that the geographic boundaries of the vegueries coincide with those of the provinces."

Art. 95.2. The High Court of Justice of Catalonia.
"The High Court of Catalonia is the final judicial instance for all proceedings initiated in Catalonia, as well as for all appeals processed within its territorial scope, (...) without prejudice to the power reserved to the Supreme Court for the unification of case law."
Interpretation
"For the unification of case law" is not confined to a specific appeal, nor does it limit the capacity of the Organic Law of the Judiciary to regulate the judicial function corresponding to the Supreme Court. Thus, the Supreme Court's powers will remain the same as in the rest of Spain.

Art. 110. Exclusive powers. "The Generalitat holds, within the scope of its exclusive powers, legislative power, regulatory power, and executive function in full".
Interpretation
Article 110 applies only to cases of full material authority of the autonomous community and does not prevent the exercise of the State's exclusive powers under Article 149 of the Constitution, whether these coincide with regional powers over the same physical space or legal subject matter, or in matters of shared authority between the State and the community, regardless of the use of the terms "exclusive power" or "exclusive powers" elsewhere in the Statute, nor does the expression "in any case," repeated throughout the Statute regarding regional areas of authority, by itself prevent the full and effective exercise of State powers.

Article 112. Executive powers.
The Generalitat holds, within the scope of its executive powers, regulatory power, which includes the approval of provisions for the execution of State regulations, as well as executive function, which in any case includes the power to organize its own administration and, in general, all those functions and activities that the legal order attributes to public administration.
Interpretation
"A different question is whether the Generalitat's executive authority may be exercised, based on 'State (legal and regulatory) rules,' not only as an executive function strictly speaking, but also as a regulatory power of general scope. The answer, in accordance with our case law, is clearly negative, even though it is settled that within the executive sphere there may be room for a functional normative authority resulting in internal organizational regulations for the services required for execution and for the regulation of the executive function's own functional authority and the set of actions necessary to implement State regulations (STC 51/2006, of February 16, FJ 4). Only understood in that specific dimension — limited to the issuance of internal organizational regulations and functional ordering of regional executive authority — does the regulatory power referred to in Art. 112 EAC not prejudice the constitutionality of Art. 112 EAC."

Article 122. Popular consultations.
The Generalitat holds exclusive authority to establish the legal regime, modalities, procedure, execution, and calling by the Generalitat itself or by local entities, within the scope of their powers, of surveys, public hearings, participation forums, and any other instrument of popular consultation, with the exception of what is provided in Article 149.1.32 of the Constitution.
Interpretation
The article "is perfectly consistent with the Constitution, on the understanding that the expression any other instrument of popular consultation does not include referendums. Such an understanding appears implicit in Art. 122 EAC itself, which makes explicit exception 'of what is provided in Article 149.1.32 of the Constitution.' However, this exception cannot be limited to State authorization for calling popular consultations by referendum, but must extend to the entire discipline of that institution, that is, to its establishment and regulation."

Article 127.3 Culture.
In State actions carried out in Catalonia regarding investment in cultural assets and facilities, prior agreement with the Generalitat is required. In the case of activities carried out by the State in relation to the international promotion of culture, the State and Generalitat governments shall establish formulas for mutual collaboration and cooperation in accordance with the provisions of Title V of this Statute.
Interpretation
"Prior agreement with the Generalitat" "is not contrary to the Constitution, since it must be understood that the absence of such agreement cannot prevent the State from fulfilling the duty imposed on it by that constitutional provision [Art. 149.2 of the Constitution, which expressly imposes on the State the consideration of 'the service of culture as an essential duty and function']."

Art. 129. Civil law. "The Generalitat holds exclusive authority over civil law matters, with the exception of matters that Article 149.1.8 of the Constitution attributes in all cases to the State (...)".
Interpretation
The article "does not refer, nor could it, to the totality of Spanish civil law, but only to Catalonia's own civil law, over which the Generalitat may perfectly hold exclusive authority for the preservation, modification, and development of that law, under the terms established in our case law, including the determination of its own system of sources. This determination, as a normative function, can only have the scope proper to the functions of 'preservation, modification, and development' of the civil law existing in Catalonia at the time it became an Autonomous Community, which are those constitutionally recognized and guaranteed to it by Art. 149.1.8 of the Constitution."

Article 138. Immigration.
1. The Generalitat holds, in matters of immigration: a) Exclusive authority regarding the initial reception of immigrants, including socio-health and orientation actions. b) The development of the policy of integrating immigrants within the framework of its powers. c) The establishment and regulation of the measures necessary for the social and economic integration of immigrants and for their social participation. d) The establishment by law of a reference framework for the reception and integration of immigrants. e) The promotion and integration of returnees and assistance to them, promoting relevant policies and measures that facilitate their return to Catalonia. 2. The Generalitat holds executive authority regarding the authorization of employment for foreigners whose employment relationship takes place in Catalonia. This authority, which shall be exercised in necessary coordination with the State's authority regarding entry and residence of foreigners, includes: a) The processing and resolution of initial authorizations for self-employment or employment. b) The processing and resolution of appeals filed in relation to the proceedings referred to in letter a) and the application of the inspection and sanction regime. 3. The Generalitat holds the authority to participate in State decisions on immigration of particular significance to Catalonia and, in particular, mandatory prior participation in determining the quota of foreign workers through the mechanisms provided for in Title V.
Interpretation
"It is for State legislation to freely determine the specific terms, forms, and conditions of the Autonomous Community's participation referred to in this provision, always preserving the ownership of any State powers potentially involved and the complete freedom of State bodies and institutions in exercising them. Consequently, Article 138 must be interpreted to mean that the reference to 'immigration' does not correspond to this constitutional matter, which is an exclusive power of the State (Art. 149.1.2 CE), but to other matters over which the Autonomous Community may assume powers."

Article 174.3. Relations of the Generalitat with the State and other Autonomous Communities. General provisions.
The Generalitat participates in the institutions, bodies, and decision-making procedures of the State that affect its powers, in accordance with this Statute and applicable laws.
Interpretation
This article "must be interpreted as providing for organic and procedural participation of the Generalitat which must be regulated by State legislation and which cannot be substantiated with respect to the State's decision-making bodies, nor can it prevent or impair the free and full exercise of State powers."

Article 180. Designation of members of the Constitutional Court and the General Council of the Judiciary.
The Generalitat participates in the processes for appointing Justices of the Constitutional Court and members of the General Council of the Judiciary, under the terms provided by law, or, where applicable, by parliamentary rules.
Interpretation
This article "does not violate the Constitution when interpreted to mean that the Generalitat's participation is conditioned, in its existence and procedures, on what is provided, within the margin permitted by the Constitution, by the corresponding organic laws."

Art. 183.1.a) Functions and composition of the Bilateral Commission.
"The Generalitat-State Bilateral Commission (...) constitutes the general and permanent framework for relations between the Generalitat and State governments for the following purposes: a) The participation and collaboration of the Generalitat in the exercise of State powers that affect Catalonia's autonomy".
Interpretation
The Bilateral Commission, as a body for the participation and collaboration of the Generalitat in the exercise of State powers, does not prevent or alter the free exercise by the State of its powers, nor does it impair decisions to be made in multilateral cooperation bodies. Thus, the relationship between the Generalitat and the "central" State cannot be understood as a relationship between equals, since the State always holds a position of superiority with respect to the autonomous communities.

Art. 206.5. Participation in the yield of State taxes.
"The State shall guarantee that the application of equalization mechanisms shall not, under any circumstances, alter Catalonia's position in the ranking of per capita income among the autonomous communities prior to equalization".
Interpretation
The State's guarantee shall only apply when the alteration of Catalonia's position is due exclusively to equalization mechanisms.

Article 210. The State-Generalitat Joint Commission on Economic and Fiscal Affairs.
1. The State-Generalitat Joint Commission on Economic and Fiscal Affairs is the bilateral body for relations between the State Administration and the Generalitat in the field of regional financing. It is responsible for the specification, application, updating, and monitoring of the financing system, as well as for channeling the full set of fiscal and financial relations between the Generalitat and the State. It is made up of an equal number of representatives from the State and the Generalitat. The presidency of this Joint Commission rotates annually between the two parties. The Commission adopts its internal and operating rules by agreement between the two delegations. The State-Generalitat Joint Commission on Economic and Fiscal Affairs exercises its functions without prejudice to agreements signed by the Government of Catalonia on this matter in multilateral institutions and bodies. 2. The State-Generalitat Joint Commission on Economic and Fiscal Affairs is responsible for: a) Agreeing on the scope and conditions of the assignment of state-owned taxes and, especially, the percentages of participation in the yield of partially assigned state taxes, referred to in Article 206, as well as their five-year review. b) Agreeing on the contribution to solidarity and equalization mechanisms provided for in Article 206. [...] d) Negotiating Catalonia's percentage of participation in the territorial distribution of European structural funds.
Interpretation
"The cooperation functions of the State-Generalitat Joint Commission on Economic and Fiscal Affairs neither exclude nor limit the capacity of multilateral institutions and bodies in matters of regional financing, do not affect the reservation of Organic Law provided for in Art. 157.3 of the Constitution, nor do they replace, prevent, or impair the free and full exercise by the State of its own powers."

Article 222. The reform of Titles that do not affect relations with the State. 1.d)
d) Once the reform has been ratified by the Cortes Generales, the Generalitat must submit it to a referendum.
Interpretation
In calling the referendum, the president of the Generalitat "does so not as a representative of the Autonomous Community (Art. 152.1 CE), but as a representative of the State (in its other institutional capacity, per that same Art. 152.1 CE, [as the ordinary representative of the State in the Autonomous Community]), which more specifically means, on behalf of the State body, the King, who is generally attributed [Art. 62(c) CE] this function. Hence Art. 62(c) CE does not pose an obstacle to the President of the Autonomous Community calling the referendum for statutory reform."

Article 223. The reform of the remaining Titles. 1.i)
Approval of the reform by the Cortes Generales through an organic law shall include State authorization for the Generalitat to call, within a maximum period of six months, the referendum referred to in letter b).
Interpretation
The same interpretation as that of Article 222.

Third additional provision, section 1.
Infrastructure investment. "State investment in infrastructure in Catalonia, excluding the Interterritorial Compensation Fund, shall be equated to Catalonia's relative share of GDP in relation to the State's GDP for a period of 7 years".
Interpretation
This section must be interpreted to mean that it "does not bind the State in defining its investment policy, nor does it impair the full freedom of the Cortes Generales to decide on the existence and amount of such investments." Thus, the section is constitutional provided it does not entail an "economic privilege" and has no "directly binding effects for the State."

Eighth (Assignment of personal income tax), ninth (hydrocarbon taxes, etc.), and tenth (VAT) additional provisions.
Interpretation
The tax-assignment percentages provided for in the eighth, ninth, and tenth additional provisions shall only take effect once they have been agreed upon, where applicable, by the relevant multilateral body and approved by the Cortes Generales.

=== Dissenting opinions ===
The authors of the four dissenting opinions that disagree with the ruling for considering it too "lenient" belong to the "conservative" wing of the court. Justice Jorge Rodríguez-Zapata Pérez considers that the Statute suffers from a "colossal defect of unconstitutionality" that was attempted to be salvaged through a "disproportionate exercise of positive legislation." Justice Javier Delgado Barrio agrees, noting that the ruling contains a "long list of interpretations" amounting to a complete rereading of the Statute that exceeds the court's functions. The Constitutional Court "has operated not as what it is — a judicial body — but as what it is not — a legislative body — since it creates a new Statute." He also states that the ruling should have begun by declaring unconstitutional the references made in the preamble to "Catalonia as a nation." "With all due respect for the sentiments of the Catalan people, it is beyond doubt that in a legal-constitutional sense there is no nation but the Spanish Nation." Justice Vicente Conde Martín de Hijas likewise considers that the ruling resorts "to an excessive degree" to the technique of interpreting articles, making them say "the opposite of what a reading respectful of their literal wording" should indicate, and that only in this way have provisions contrary to the Constitution passed through the court's filter. Finally, Justice Ramón Rodríguez Arribas states that both the reference to historical rights and to bilaterality should have been declared unconstitutional.

The fifth dissenting opinion, that of "progressive" Catalan justice Eugeni Gay, takes an entirely opposite view to the other four. According to this justice, "the adjective 'national' applied to Catalonia should not be understood as opposed to the Spanish Nation, in the same way that the concepts of Catalan citizenship and the Catalan people do not signify the denial of the existence of Spanish citizenship or the Spanish people." He thus concludes that the ruling "silences" Spain's intrinsic plurality, and that it therefore failed to respond to "the legal reality of the contemporary world, in which sovereignties are difficult to distinguish and States are not sovereign in the full sense of the term." Therefore, according to Gay, there has been an "incorrect inclusion" in the ruling of the considerations that references to the definition of "Catalonia as a nation" and to the "national reality of Catalonia" lack interpretive legal effect, constituting a "forced reading" of the Statute's preamble.

The six justices who did not submit any dissenting opinion were the "progressives" María Emilia Casas Baamonde, president of the court and rapporteur of the ruling, Pascual Sala Sánchez, Elisa Pérez Vera, and Manuel Aragón Reyes, and the "conservative" Guillermo Jiménez Sánchez.

== Initial reactions ==
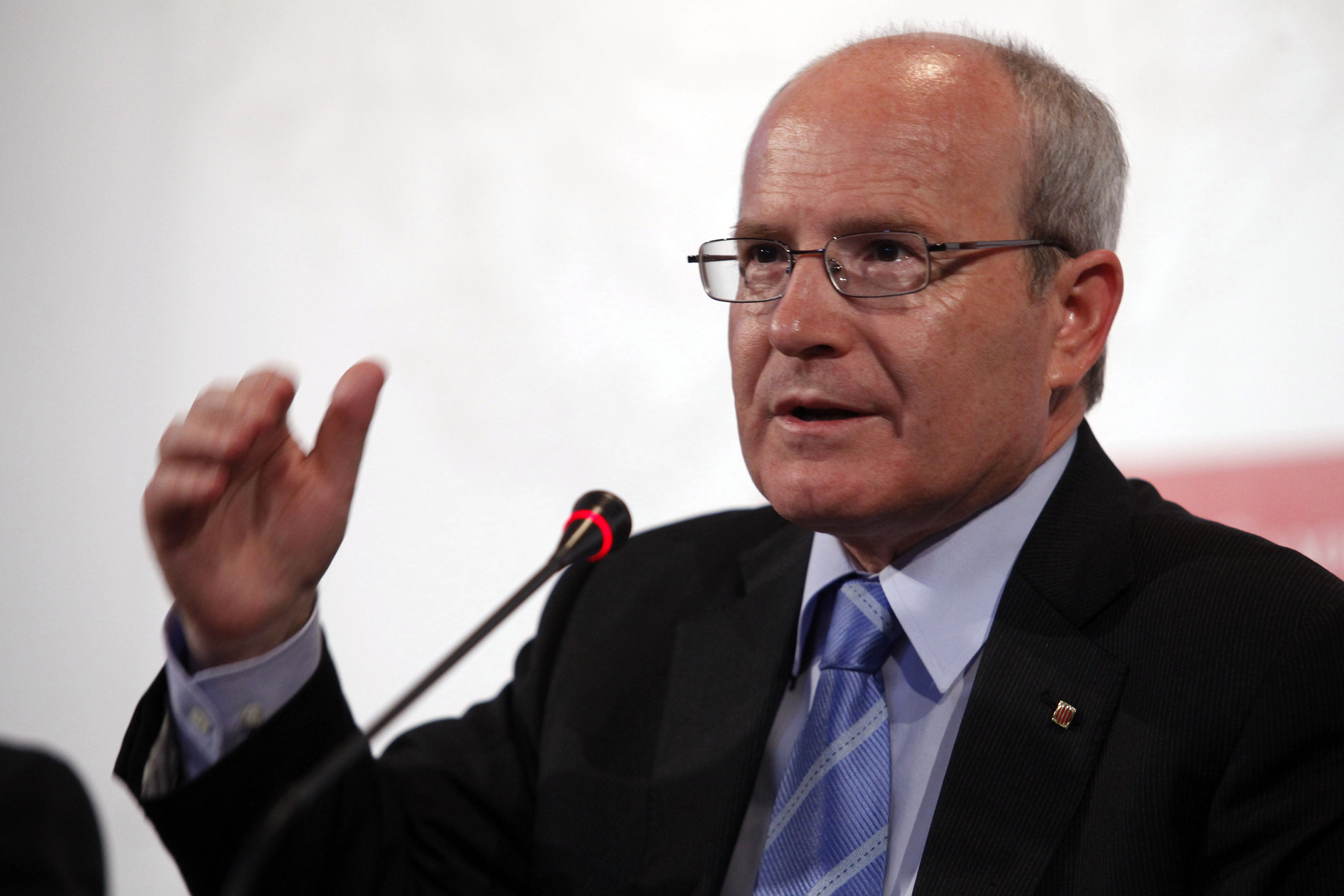
President of the Generalitat José Montilla (November 2010).

Shortly after the ruling became known, the President of the Generalitat of Catalonia José Montilla made a statement that same day, June 28, 2010, expressing his outrage at the ruling and calling on Prime Minister José Luis Rodríguez Zapatero to "rebuild" the foundations of the Statute and achieve through negotiation what the Constitutional Court had cut short. "We are not satisfied, we want the full Statute," he stated, and then called on all Catalans to show their rejection of the ruling "massively" at a demonstration called for July 10. "Let us walk together, united, all of us who want the country. Let us show that we are a nation and we are a single people," he said.

As soon as the ruling became known, CiU released a statement describing the situation as "extremely serious." "Spain has already passed judgment," stated Felip Puig, secretary general of Democratic Convergence of Catalonia. For his part, the president of Republican Left of Catalonia, Joan Puigcercós, called it a "deathblow" and predicted the growth of Catalan independentism, since a significant part of Catalonia's citizenry "does not fit within" the Spanish Constitution. Very different was the reaction of Alicia Sánchez-Camacho, president of the People's Party of Catalonia, the promoter of the appeal of unconstitutionality, who stated that following the ruling "there are no winners or losers."

In Madrid, deputy prime minister María Teresa Fernández de la Vega characterized the ruling as a defeat for the People's Party, since, according to her, the Constitutional Court "has upheld the constitutionality of the Statute in almost its entirety." For her part, Soraya Sáenz de Santamaría, parliamentary spokesperson for the People's Party, stated: "The important thing is that the court has partly upheld the PP's appeal and questions 50 articles." "It also firmly establishes that the term 'nation' with binding force applies only to the Spanish nation," she added.

=== Similarities with the Andalusian statute ===
Various organizations, such as the State Legal Service or the Institute of Regional Studies of the Generalitat of Catalonia, have highlighted the differing criteria regarding the constitutionality of very similar or identical articles in the Catalan statute and in the Andalusian statute, approved in November 2006. For example, section 1 of Article 99 of the Catalan statute, declared unconstitutional, reads:

The Council of Justice of Catalonia is composed of the President of the High Court of Justice of Catalonia, who chairs it, and of members appointed, in accordance with the provisions of the Organic Law of the Judiciary, from among Judges, Magistrates, Prosecutors, or jurists of recognized standing. The Parliament of Catalonia designates the members of the Council as determined by the Organic Law of the Judiciary.

While Article 144.2 of the Andalusian statute reads:

The Council of Justice of Andalusia is composed of the President of the High Court of Justice of Andalusia, who chairs it, and of members chosen from among Judges, Magistrates, Prosecutors, and jurists of recognized standing appointed in accordance with the provisions of the Organic Law of the Judiciary, with the Parliament of Andalusia responsible for designating the members determined by that Law.

In economic matters, the Andalusian statute has led to differing interpretations by the central and regional governments following its approval, citing the ruling of unconstitutionality on the Catalan statute.

=== July 10, 2010, demonstration ===
On the afternoon of Saturday, July 10, 2010, a large demonstration took place in Barcelona — considered by its organizers to be the largest in the history of democracy in Catalonia, even larger than the Diada of September 11, 1977 — to show rejection of the Constitutional Court's ruling, although the chants and signs that predominated were in favor of Catalan independence, and Estelada flags were far more numerous than Catalan flags (the youth wing of Democratic Convergence of Catalonia unfurled a large banner reading Catalonia is not Spain). It had been called by the Generalitat of Catalonia, the Catalan political parties (with the exception of the People's Party and Ciudadanos – Partido de la Ciudadanía), and a thousand cultural, civic, and social organizations under the slogan Som una nació. Nosaltres decidim ('We are a nation. We decide'). The organization was led by the Catalanist entity Òmnium Cultural. The demonstration was led by a large Catalan flag measuring 250 square meters, followed by the president of the Generalitat of Catalonia, José Montilla, accompanied by the president of the Parliament of Catalonia, Ernest Benach, and former presidents of the Generalitat of Catalonia Jordi Pujol and Pasqual Maragall and former presidents of the Parliament of Catalonia Joan Rigol and Heribert Barrera. Behind them walked the leaders of the four main parties that had called the demonstration: PSC, CiU, ERC, and ICV.

The head of the demonstration had trouble advancing along Passeig de Gràcia because of the crowd gathered there. When it reached the intersection with the Gran Via, it could no longer move forward, and it was then that whistling intensified along with chants in Catalan of "Politicians out. The people at the front," as well as insults and shouts of botifler directed at the president of the Generalitat, Montilla (there was even an attempted attack). Security services then decided to move the president into the nearby Department of Justice building, from where he later exited through a side door where his official car awaited him.

== Assessment ==
According to philologist and historian Jordi Amat, "the ruling was written with the old ink of Jacobinism and struck where it could hurt most. On the skin. There, where the citizens of Catalonia affirmed their awareness of belonging to a singular political community. The Statute could say whatever it wanted. Nation, constitutionally, there was only one. The idea of sovereignty was the classic one, rigid and petrified, and it prevented progress toward the federalization of the State. (...) What was thwarted was not merely the hope embodied in the 2006 Statute... It was plainly and simply a victory for Spanish nationalism. And for Jacobinism too. The People's Party's idea of Spain, grounded in a uniformizing reading of the Constitution, had won."

According to professors Jaume Claret and Manuel Santirso, the Constitutional Court's ruling sealed the failure of the new Statute project, which "had sought a differentiated and distinct solution for Catalonia," and with it the defeat of the classic approaches of political Catalanism, both the "negotiated" approach that CiU had defended until then and the "federal" approach advocated by the PSC. From then on, the initiative ceased to lie with the government of the Generalitat of Catalonia or the Parliament of Catalonia, passing instead into the hands of the various organizations that clearly favored independence.

Political scientist Ignacio Sánchez-Cuenca, of Charles III University of Madrid, states that "the Constitutional Court's ruling is based on a 'literalist' reading of the constitutional text," because, according to him, "the Constitution does not explicitly state that the Spanish nation is the only one that exists; it merely says that the unity of that nation is indissoluble." By declaring that no nation other than the Spanish one exists, the Court adopts positions "typical of a Spanish nationalism that abhors the political possibility of multinationality" and resorts "to the most abstract (and I would venture to say, metaphysical) version of the concept of sovereignty" by failing "to consider its actual exercise within the framework of constituted politics" and by not having considered it possible "that the sovereignty of the Spanish nation could be shared with other national sovereignties within Spain," while the Constitutional Court has never raised any objection regarding the transfer of sovereignty to the European Union. "The Constitutional Court's double standard with respect to European integration and the national recognition of the Basque Country and Catalonia reflects, perhaps not in the legal order, but certainly in the political order, ideological prejudices. (...) What is operating here are ideological values, in this case the values of a Spanish nationalism willing to accept Spain's plurality but not its multinationality, and which, nonetheless, sees no legal difficulty in proceeding to hollow out national sovereignty for the benefit of European institutions. (...) It should not be forgotten that the Constitutional Court's justices are Spanish citizens, socialized within Spanish legal culture, sensitive to the prevailing climate of opinion in the country and to the dominant discourses on nationalism as anti-Spainism." What is certain is that following the publication of the ruling, there was a dramatic rise in independentism in Catalonia.

== Bibliography ==
- Amat, Jordi (2017). La conjura de los irresponsables [La conjura de los irresponsables] (in Spanish). Barcelona: Anagrama. ISBN 978-84-339-1618-1.
- Claret, Jaume; Santirso, Manuel (2014). La construcción del catalanismo. Historia de un afán político (in Spanish). Madrid: Los Libros de la Catarata. ISBN 978-84-8319-898-8.
- Sánchez-Cuenca, Ignacio (2012). Años de cambios, años de crisis. Ocho años de gobiernos socialistas, 2004-2011 (in Spanish). Madrid: Los Libros de la Catarata-Fundación Alternativas. ISBN 978-84-8319-682-3.
- Sánchez-Cuenca, Ignacio (2018). La confusión nacional. La democracia española ante la crisis catalana (in Spanish). Madrid: Los Libros de la Catarata. ISBN 978-84-9097-425-4.
