= Elisa Pérez Vera =

Spanish jurist (born 1940)

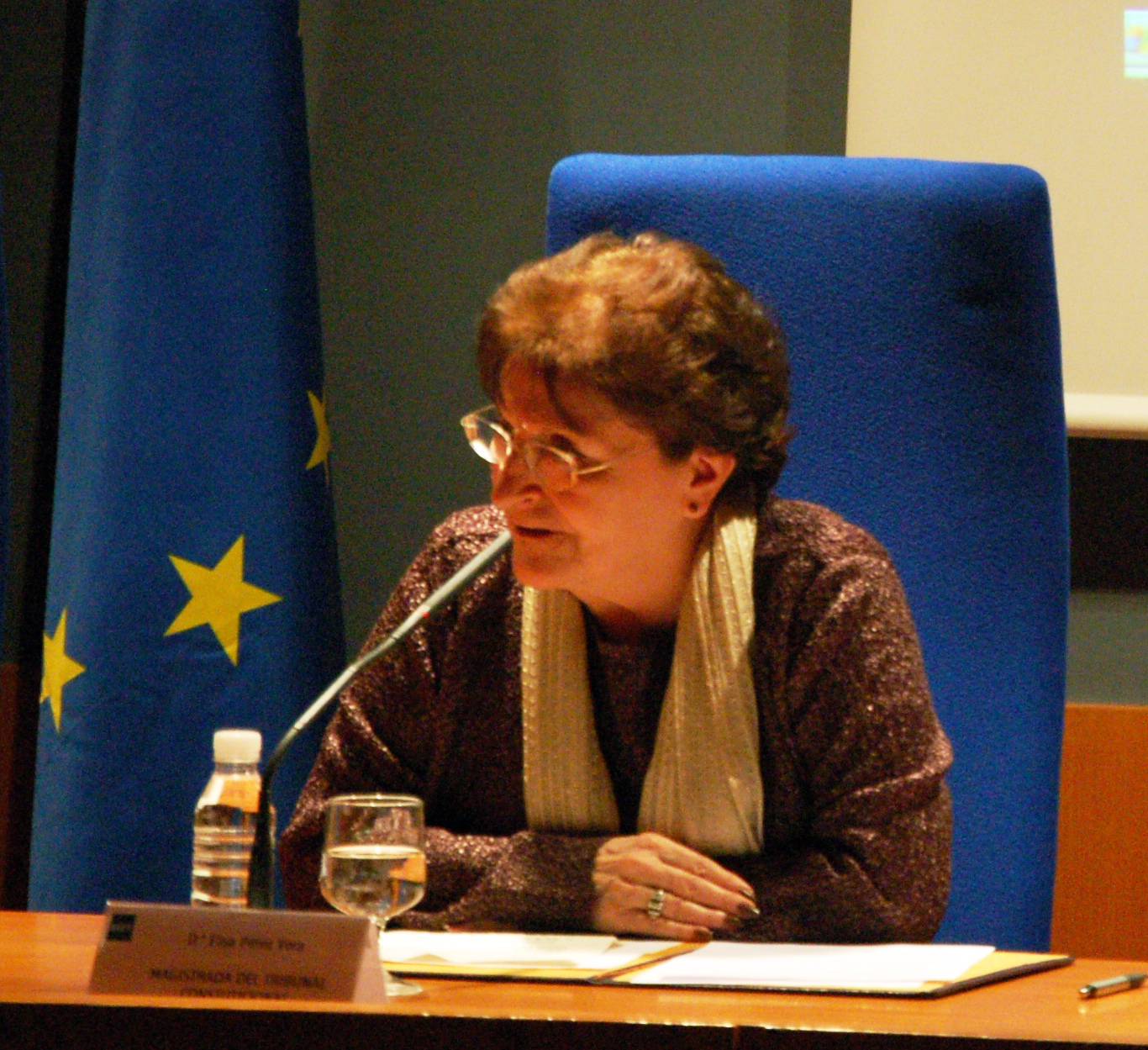
- At the 2011 Elisa Pérez Vera Award ceremony
- Born: 1 June 1940 (age 86); Granada, Spain
- Education: University of Granada
- Occupations: Jurist, professor, writer
- Employer: National University of Distance Education
- Organization: Royal Academy of Jurisprudence and Legislation
- Parents: Antonio Pérez Funes (father); Francisca Vera Casares (mother)
- Awards: Medal of Andalusia (2003); Order of Isabella the Catholic

Elisa Pérez Vera (born 1 June 1940) is a Spanish jurist, a professor of Private International Law at the National University of Distance Education (UNED) and magistrate of the Constitutional Court of Spain from 2001 to 2012. In 1982 she was appointed Rector of the UNED, becoming the first woman rector at a Spanish public university. The UNED has instituted the Elisa Pérez Vera Award to recognize research work on gender or feminism.

== Career ==
Elisa Pérez Vera was born in Granada, the daughter of Antonio Pérez Funes and Francisca Vera Casares.

She studied law at the University of Granada, graduating in 1961 and earning her doctorate in 1965. Since 1961 she has taught at the same university as an assistant professor, and since 1967 as an adjunct professor.

A specialist in international law, she was a member of the Spanish delegation in the United Nations special committee for the definition of aggression in Geneva. She participated as a speaker, adviser, and expert on various committees from 1971 to 1976 at the International Conference in The Hague.

From 1975 to 1979 she was an associate professor at the Autonomous University of Madrid, and a professor of the University of Santiago de Compostela for a few months. In 1979 she went on to hold the chair of Private International Law at the National University of Distance Education.

In 1982, she was elected rector of the UNED, becoming the first woman to attain this post at a Spanish public university. In 1987 she was appointed General Secretary of the Council of Universities, a position she held until 1991.

After a hiatus motivated by health issues, she chaired the Advisory Council of Andalusia from 1994 to 2001.

At the proposal of the Spanish Socialist Workers' Party (PSOE) in the Congress of Deputies, she was appointed magistrate of the Constitutional Court in 2001, with a mandate that ended on 7 November 2010, but was extended until 2012 due to the absence of an agreement between the People's Party and the PSOE in the Congress of Deputies for the renewal of the four corresponding magistrates.

She was the initial rapporteur of the ruling on the Statute of Autonomy of Catalonia, composing five drafts favorable to the Statute that did not obtain the support of the plenary. Finally, in April 2010, after the first draft was rejected, she was replaced by President María Emilia Casas, with the presentation put in the charge of magistrate Javier Delgado Barrio.

Pérez Vera was criticized for a questionable distribution of cases in the Constitutional Court, since a year and a half after the ruling on the Statute of Autonomy of Catalonia, issues related to the illegality of Bildu (and later of Sortu) were adjudicated, on which two drafts favorable to its legalization were issued, contrary to the Supreme Court's rulings, and which were approved by the plenary of the high court. The situation was made public by the president of the Community of Madrid, Esperanza Aguirre, who described the events of "shame" and harshly criticized the judgment for its defective technique, when entering into assessments of the facts and evidence, outside the jurisdiction of the Court.

== Awards and distinctions ==
- Corresponding academic of the Royal Academy of Jurisprudence and Legislation
- Member of the Royal Academy of Jurisprudence and Legislation of Granada
- Namesake of the National University of Distance Education's award for research work on gender or feminism
- Dame of the Order of Isabella the Catholic
- Grand Cross of Aeronautical Merit (1985)
- Medal of Andalusia (2003)
- Doctor Honoris Causa of the University of Alcalá (2014)
- Favorite daughter of the Province of Granada

== Publications ==
- Derecho internacional privado : parte especial, 1973
- Naciones Unidas y los principios de la coexistencia pacífica, 1973
- Intereses del tráfico jurídico externo y derecho internacional privado, 1973
- Citoyenneté de l'Union européenne, nationalité et condition des étrangers, 2008
