= María Emilia Casas =

Spanish jurist (born 1950)

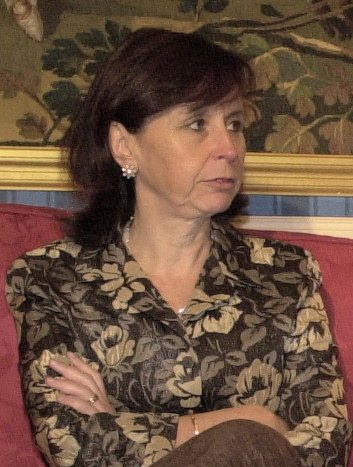
- June 2004 in La Moncloa

President of the Constitutional Court of Spain
- In office 15 June 2004 – 12 January 2011
- Preceded by: Manuel Jiménez
- Succeeded by: Pascual Sala

Member of the Constitutional Court of Spain
- In office 16 December 1998 – 12 January 2011

Personal details
- Born: María Emilia Casas Baamonde; 30 November 1950 (age 75) León, Spain
- Spouse: Jesús Leguina
- Education: Complutense University of Madrid
- Occupation: Jurist

María Emilia Casas Baamonde (born 30 November 1950) is a Spanish jurist. She was the country's first woman Professor of Labor and Social Security Law. In 1998, she joined the Constitutional Court of Spain, becoming the youngest member in the history of the institution. In 2004, she was the Constitutional Court's first woman president, and she continued in that role until 2011. During her presidency, progress was made in anti-discrimination and equality law.

== Biography ==
Originally from Monforte de Lemos, where a street is named for her grandfather Roberto Baamonde Robles, a politician and cavalry commander, María Emilia Casas was born in León, where her father was the property registrar.

She studied law at the Complutense University of Madrid, where she graduated Premio Extraordinario, and received a Ph.D. with the same qualification as a pupil of the Complutense professor emeritus of Law, Manuel Alonso Olea. She also has a degree in Philosophy and Literature.

== Academic career ==
Casas has been Professor of Labor Law and Social Security at the Law School of the Complutense University, the first woman with this chair in the country. She has taught classes in various postgraduate programs and specialization courses in different Spanish and foreign universities. She is a member of the management committee of Charles III University of Madrid, and has also been its vice-rector of International and Institutional Relations.

She has been a member of the council of the Bartolomé de las Casas International Institute of Political Sciences and Human Rights.

== Expert in labor relations ==
Casas has made labor relations a key element in her professional career, participating in various international seminars and lecturing on the subject.

In addition to holding the Chair of Labor Law and Social Security in Spain, she taught master's degree classes in Occupational Risk Management at the University of Salamanca.

In 1998, shortly before becoming a member of the Constitutional Court at the request of the government, she was part of the group of experts on labor standards charged with drafting the law regulating stable part-time work.

== Career on the Constitutional Court ==
On 16 December 1998, Casas was elected Magistrate of the Constitutional Court of Spain, becoming the youngest member in the institution's history, and in 2004 she was named its president, becoming the first woman to hold that office. For her appointment, she obtained the votes of the progressive magistrates and those of the conservatives Roberto García Calvo and Jorge Rodríguez-Zapata.

These were subsequently challenged by the debate on the constitutionality of the reform that the Socialist Party, IU-ICV, and CiU carried out to the Organic Law of the Constitutional Court. Popularly known as the Casas Amendment, it established the automatic extension of the Presidency of the Court while there was no renewal of the judges whose term had expired. According to the appeals filed by the People's Party to the Plenary of the Constitutional Court, this usurped the mandate established in Article 160 of the Spanish Constitution, to elect the President of said Court every three years. This amendment, collected in article 16.3 of the Organic Law of the Constitutional Court (LOTC), was declared in accordance with the Constitution in Constitutional Court Decision 47/2008, of 9 April.

In 2007, she was subjected to harsh criticism and accused of a crime of improper counseling. A woman contacted Casas by telephone, facilitated by a neighbor, to ask her opinion about the conflicts with her ex-husband and the recovery of custody of her daughter. It was the lawyer María Dolores Martín Pozo who told the Court President that she had gone through a judicial trial and wanted to regain custody of her daughter. Casas received documentation and maintained telephone conversations with the latter, telling her that she should "provoke a judicial action to reach the Constitutional Court en amparo", and that she should be called if she did appeal to the Court. Said woman was later arrested on charges of hiring a hitman to kill her ex-husband. The plot was discovered due to a wiretap, decreed by a judge, on the woman's telephone. Casas was accused of a crime of improper counseling. In June 2008, the Criminal Chamber of the Supreme Court closed the case.

=== Advances in anti-discrimination law and equality ===
As a professor of labor law, during her presidency the Constitutional Court consolidated the anti-discrimination protection for reasons of gender in its multiple aspects, and reinforced the protection of pregnant workers (STC 92/2008), while attributing the constitutional dimension to all those measures aimed at facilitating the reconciliation of work and family life of workers (STC 3/2007). It also set insurmountable limits based on the dignity of the person and on the free development of the personality, on the entrepreneurial capacity of employers to control the free time of workers (STC 192/2003). In short, it contributed to extending the protection of the rights to strike and freedom of association to the contexts of productive decentralization (STC 75/2010).

During Casas' Presidency, the Court also endorsed the constitutionality of the Comprehensive Law Against Gender Violence, recognizing the specific characteristics of this criminal phenomenon, the needs of protection of the victim, and the greater social reproach of aggression against the wife or partner. In the application of the anti-discrimination law – highlighted by Inmaculada Montalbán, president of the Observatory Against Gender Violence – she followed the path marked by the commitments made by Spain at an international and European level.

She was responsible for drafting the seventh and final version of the ruling on the Statute of Autonomy of Catalonia, after not previously achieving sufficient support in the Plenary Session of the Court.

She left the presidency of the Court in January 2011.

In 2014, she joined the Ejaso Law Firm as an attorney.

In November 2018, she was appointed as a member of the Council of State of Spain.

== Honorary distinctions ==
- Pelayo Award for Jurists of Recognized Prestige (2006)
- Extraordinary Honor Award for a career of dedication and prestige in the legal-labor field, granted by the National Association of Labor Lawyers (2007)
- Grand Cross of the Order of Charles III (2011)
- Galician of the Year (2011) from El Correo Gallego
- Grand Cross of the Order of St. Raymond of Peñafort (5 December 2013)

== Personal life ==
María Emilia Casas was married to the Professor of Administrative Law and advisor to the Bank of Spain, Jesús Leguina Villa (1942–2016), and has four children.

Preceded by Manuel Jiménez	President of the Constitutional Court of Spain; 2004–2011	Succeeded by Pascual Sala
