= Statute of autonomy =

Basic institutional law of autonomous communities in Spain

In Spain, a statute of autonomy (Note: "Statute of Autonomy" Spanish: estatuto de autonomía, Catalan: estatut d'autonomia, Galician: estatuto de autonomía, Asturian: estatutu d'autonomía, Basque: autonomia estatutua) is the basic institutional, quasi-constitutional law of an autonomous community or autonomous city. The process of devolution after the transition to democracy (1979) created 17 autonomous communities and 2 autonomous cities, each having its own Statute of Autonomy. The two autonomous cities are Ceuta and Melilla, both on the north coast of Africa.

These statutes define the institutional framework within a region and the powers (Spanish: competencias) of the region, within the limits of the Constitution. Powers fall into four broad categories: those exclusive to the State; those where the State legislates and the autonomous communities implement this legislation; those where the State defines framework legislation and the regions add detailed legislation and are responsible for execution; and finally those powers that are exclusive the autonomous communities.

== Legal basis ==
Statutes of autonomy are defined in the Spanish Constitution. Statutes of autonomy are part of the legal system of the State, but how they are drafted and approved is distinct from other laws. Initially drafted by an assembly made up of members of Provincial Councils wishing to become an autonomous community, they are then submitted to the Spanish Parliament as a bill and passed into law.

To modify or replace a statute of autonomy, the process is according to provisions in the existing statute but is initiated and drafted by the parliament of the autonomous community and require a strong majority to pass (e.g., two-thirds in Catalonia or three-fifths in Murcia). They must then be approved by Spanish Parliament as an organic law, which requires an absolute majority voting in favour in the Congress of Deputies.

== Reform ==
As the Constitution had not set clearly defined methods for power sharing, particularly over shared jurisdiction or powers, there had been major conflict because the real power of an autonomous community depended upon how far the State wanted to legislate. Since 1982, the PSOE and later the PP pursued policies to temper enthusiasm for devolution and instead sought to harmonise the powers devolved to all autonomous communities. This was interpreted by the 'historic nationalities' of Catalonia and the Basque Country as the re-imposition of centralist control from Madrid particularly after a landmark ruling of the Constitutional Court upheld the prerogative of the central government to use 'Basic (ie framework) Laws' to encroach upon devolved jurisdictional powers to promote and protect 'the national interest' of the Spanish state.

Consequently, from about 2004, there was a wave of reform of statutes aimed at updating and resolving conflicts. On 18 June 2006, Catalonia approved by referendum a highly innovative but controversial new statute that was seen as the leading model of reform, with such elements as a full charter of rights and a detailed chapter on the judiciary. This triggered and influenced reform of several other statutes which have been modified including those of Valencia (2006), Balearic Islands (2007), Andalucía (2007), Aragón (2007), Castile and León (2007), Navarra (2010), and Extremadura (2011), all agreed by the national parliament and the two main Spanish parties.

== List of autonomy statutes ==
#	Name	Adopted	Latest reform
1	Basque Country	18 December 1979 (LO 3/1979)	
2	Catalonia	18 December 1979 (LO 4/1979)	19 July 2006 (LO 6/2006)
3	Galicia	6 April 1981 (LO 1/1981)	
4	Andalusía	30 December 1981 (LO 6/1981)	19 March 2007 (LO 2/2007)
5	Asturias	30 December 1981 (LO 7/1981)	
6	Cantabria	30 December 1981 (LO 8/1981)	
7	La Rioja	9 June 1982 (LO 3/1982)	
8	Region of Murcia	9 June 1982 (LO 4/1982)	
9	Valencian Community	1 July 1982 (LO 5/1982)	10 April 2006 (LO 1/2006)
10	Aragon	10 August 1982 (LO 8/1982)	20 April 2007 (LO 5/2007)
11	Castilla-La Mancha	10 August 1982 (LO 9/1982)	
12	Canary Islands	10 August 1982 (LO 10/1982)	6 November 2018 (LO 1/2018)
13	Navarre	10 August 1982 (LO 13/1982)	
14	Extremadura	25 February 1983 (LO 1/1983)	28 January 2011 (LO 1/2011)
15	Balearic Islands	25 February 1983 (LO 2/1983)	28 February 2007 (LO 1/2007)
16	Community of Madrid	25 February 1983 (LO 3/1983)	
17	Castile and León	25 February 1983 (LO 4/1983)	
18	Ceuta	13 March 1995 (LO 1/1995)	
19	Melilla	13 March 1995 (LO 2/1995)	

== See also ==
- Autonomous communities of Spain
- Government of Wales Act 1998
- Nationalities and regions of Spain
- Northern Ireland Act 1998
- Scotland Act 1998

== Bibliography ==
- Anderson, Paul (2020a). "Decentralisation at a crossroads: Spain, Catalonia and the Territorial Crisis" (PDF). Ethnopolitics. 19 (4). London: Routledge: 342–355. doi:10.1080/17449057.2020.1795470. ISSN 1744-9065. OCLC 300873767.
- Anderson, Paul (2020b). "A Consociational Compromise? Constitutional Evolution in Spain and Catalonia". In Keil, S; McCulloch, A (eds.). Power-sharing in Europe: Past practice, present cases and future directions. Springer. p. 201-225. doi:10.1007/978-3-030-53590-2_9. ISBN 978-3-030-53590-2.
- Arzoz, Xabier (2012). "New developments in Spanish federalism". L'Europe en Formation. 363 (1): 179–188. doi:10.3917/eufor.363.0179. ISSN 2410-9231. OCLC 140465166.
- Casanas Adam, Elisenda (2017). "The Constitutional Court of Spain: From System Balancer to Polarizing Centralist". In Aroney, Nicholas; Kincaid, John (eds.). Courts in Federal Countries. University of Toronto Press. pp. 367–403. ISBN 978-1-4875-1466-2. JSTOR 10.3138/j.ctt1whm97c.16.
- Colino, César (2017). "Living with Contradictions in Federalism: goals and outcomes of recent constitutional and financial reforms in the Spanish Estado autonómico". In Skogstad, Grace; Banting, Keith; Cameron, David; Papillon, Martin (eds.). The Global Promise of Federalism. University of Toronto Press. pp. 214–235. ISBN 9781442619197. OCLC 1004879919.
- Force, Marina (11 October 2017). "Catalonia's Place in Spain: A Brief History"". Wall Street Journal. Archived from the original on 20 Oct 2020.
- "The Spanish Constitution" (PDF). Agencia Estatal Boletín Oficial del Estado. 1978.
- "Territorial policy (auntonomous communities)". Ministry of Territorial Policy.
