= Generalitat de Catalunya =

Government of Catalonia, Spain

Government of Catalonia
- Seal of the Government of Catalonia

- Logo of the Government of Catalonia

Government of Catalonia overview
- Formed: 19 December 1359 (first inception) (666 years, 327 days); 17 April 1931 (established by the Second Spanish Republic) (95 years, 208 days); 29 September 1977 (reestablished from exile) (49 years, 43 days)
- Dissolved: 16 September 1714 (defeat in the War of the Spanish Succession) (312 years, 56 days); 5 February 1939 (Francoist occupation during Spanish Civil War) (87 years, 279 days)
- Jurisdiction: Catalonia
- Headquarters: Palace of the Generalitat of Catalonia
- Employees: 240,000
- Annual budget: €34.03 billion (2017)
- Government of Catalonia executives: Salvador Illa, President of the Government of Catalonia; Josep Rull, President of Parliament of Catalonia; 16 ministers, Executive Council of Catalonia
- Website: gencat.cat

The Generalitat de Catalunya (GENCAT; Catalan pronunciation: [ʒənəɾəliˈtad də kətəˈluɲə]; Spanish: Generalidad de Cataluña; Occitan: Generalitat de Catalonha), or the Government of Catalonia, is the institutional system by which Catalonia is self-governed as an autonomous community of Spain. It is made up of the Parliament of Catalonia, the President of the Government of Catalonia, and the Executive Council of Catalonia (or council of ministers, also very often referred to as Govern, "Government"). Its current powers are set out in the Statute of Autonomy of Catalonia of 2006.

The origins of the Generalitat are in the 13th century when permanent councils of deputies (deputations) were created to rule administration of the Courts of the different realms that formed the Crown of Aragon which gave birth to the Deputation of the General of the Principality of Catalonia (1359), the Deputation of the General of the Kingdom of Aragon (1362) and the Deputation of the General of the Kingdom of Valencia (1412). The modern Generalitat was established in 1931, as the institution of self-government of Catalonia within the Spanish Republic. After the end of the Civil War in 1940 the President was executed and the Generalitat abolished. Notwithstanding, the presidency went into exile until it was reestablished in 1977.

Its headquarters are at the Palau de la Generalitat, in the city of Barcelona.

== History ==
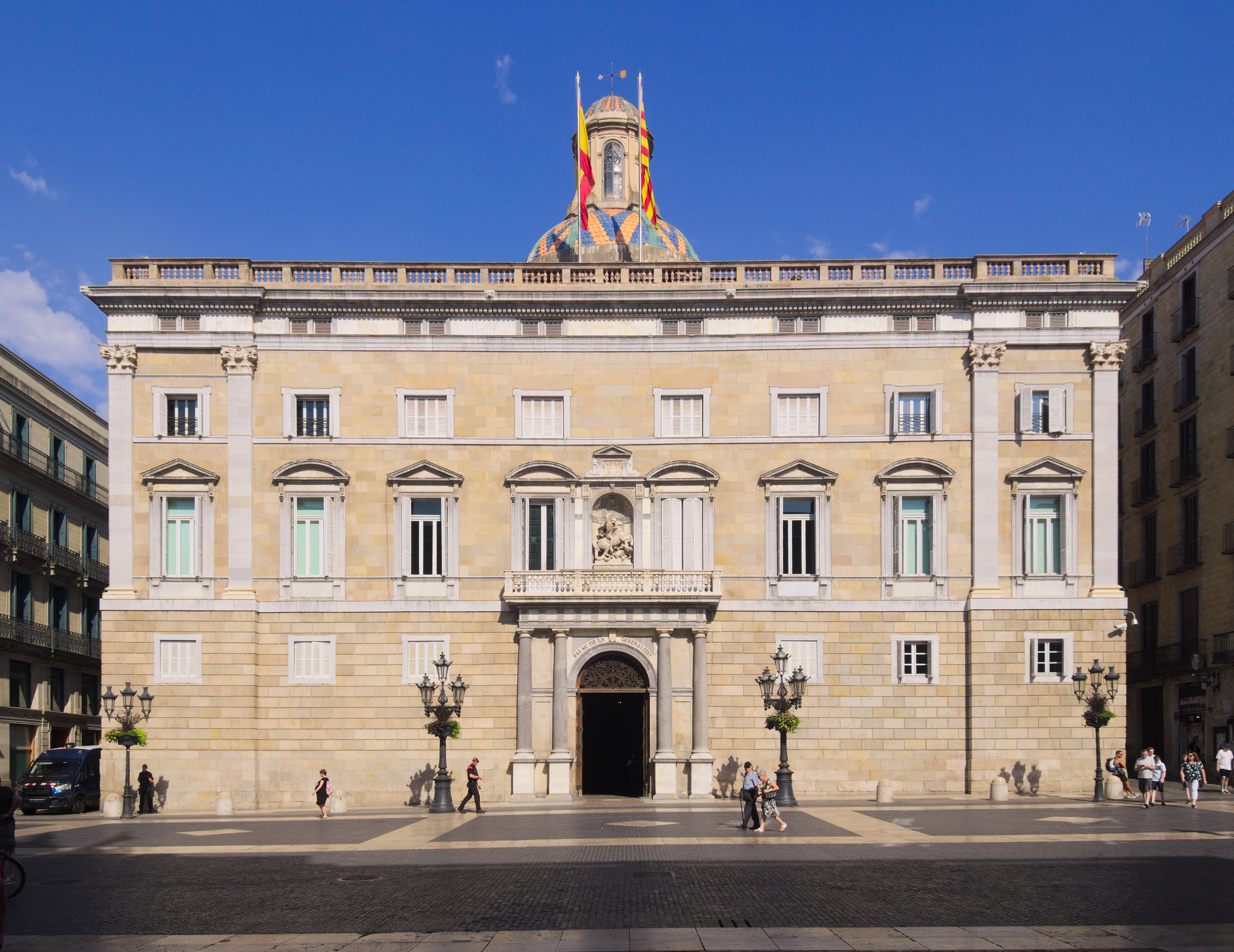
Palau de la Generalitat de Catalunya, Barcelona, seat of the Executive Council and the Presidency of Catalonia

Catalonia's political past as a territorially differentiated community with its own representative and separated institutions, materialized in the institutional systems of the combined Catalan counties (9th–12th centuries), the Principality of Catalonia within the Crown of Aragon (1164–1714) and the Monarchy of Spain (1516–1714/1833), as well the establishment of Catalan self-government from 1931 onwards, can be divided into different stages, separated by ruptures in the legal/public order.

The Generalitat of Catalonia can trace its origins in the General Court of Catalonia (or Catalan Courts), as during the reign of James I the Conqueror (1208–1276) they reunited and were convoked by the king, as representatives of the social statements of the time. Under the reign of Peter the Great (1276–1285), the Catalan Courts gained institutional status, after the king obliged himself to celebrate an annual "General Court". The General Court of Catalonia exercised as Council and had legislative functions through its three branches (braços): the ecclesiastical (clergy), the military (nobility) and the popular (villages and towns submitted to direct rule of the king). This union of the tree branches was named "Lo General de Cathalunya", where "General" means the political community of the Catalans as a whole.

In 1289 the first step towards becoming an institution occurred when the courts met in the castle of Montsó. (Although located in the Kingdom of Aragon, Montsó had been ruled by the Count of Barcelona since the year 1151 AD when Count Ramon Berenguer IV married Princess Petronilla of Aragon). A body was appointed, designated the "Diputació del General" (Deputation of the General), to temporarily collect the "services" or tributes that the "branches" granted the king on his demand. This tax was popularly known as "Drets Generals" (General Rights) or "generalitats" (generalities), similar to the French "Généralités", which were also founded as tax districts.

=== Medieval origins ===
Old emblem of the Generalitat

The Pau i Treva de Déu ("Peace and Truce of God") was a social movement born in the eleventh century promoted by the Church, united with the peasantry as the response to the violence perpetrated by feudal nobles. The hometowns, then, delimited a space protected of feudal violence. However, to ensure a coexistence climate, it was necessary to go further, establishing an authority that prohibited the practice of any type of violent act anywhere in the territory. This was the objective of the assemblies of Peace and Truce of God, the first of which, in the Catalan counties, took place in Toluges (Roussillon), in 1027, under the presidency of Abbot Oliba, on behalf of Bishop Berenguer d'Elna, absent from the diocese because he was on a pilgrimage. The origin of the General Court of Catalonia can be considered from the Peace of Truce of God.

The Generalitat of Catalonia stems from the medieval institution which ruled, in the name of the King as Count of Barcelona, some aspects of the administration of the Principality of Catalonia. The General Court of Catalonia was the most relevant institution of the Principality during its existence as a polity and passed the Constitutions of Catalonia, the main set of laws. The first Catalan constitutions were that of the Courts of 1283.

The Medieval precedent of the Generalitat, the Diputació del General de Catalunya ("Deputation of the General of Catalonia") was a permanent council of deputies established by the Courts in order to collect the new "tax of the General" (or tribute for the King) in 1359. The "general" refers to the combination of the three estates: nobility, church and people. The tax became known was the drets del General or Generalitats. The council gained important political power during the next centuries, assuming tasks including that of prosecutor. In 1931, the name Generalitat was chosen by the legislators of the new self government to help legitimise their function.

=== First abolition ===
Catalan institutions which depended on the Generalitat were abolished in what is currently known in Catalonia as Northern Catalonia, one year after the signature of the Treaty of the Pyrenees in the 17th century, which transferred the territory from Spanish to French sovereignty.

Then, by the early 18th century, with the issue of the "Nueva Planta Decrees" after the Catalan defeat in the War of the Spanish Succession, the institution, as well as the other political institutions of the Principality, was abolished.

=== First restoration ===
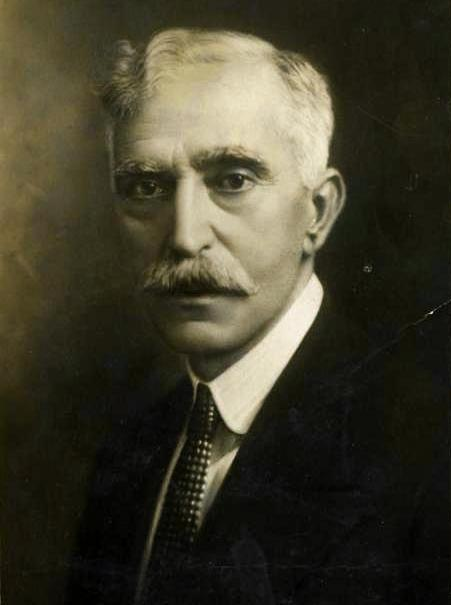
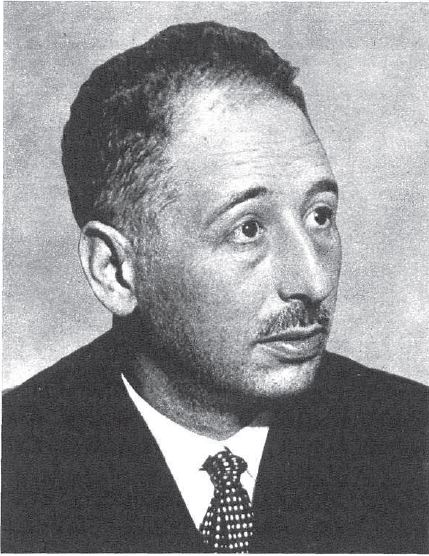
Left: Francesc Macià, first President of the restored Generalitat of Catalonia (1931–1933). Right: Lluís Companys, second President of the Generalitat (1933–1940), executed by Franco's regime.

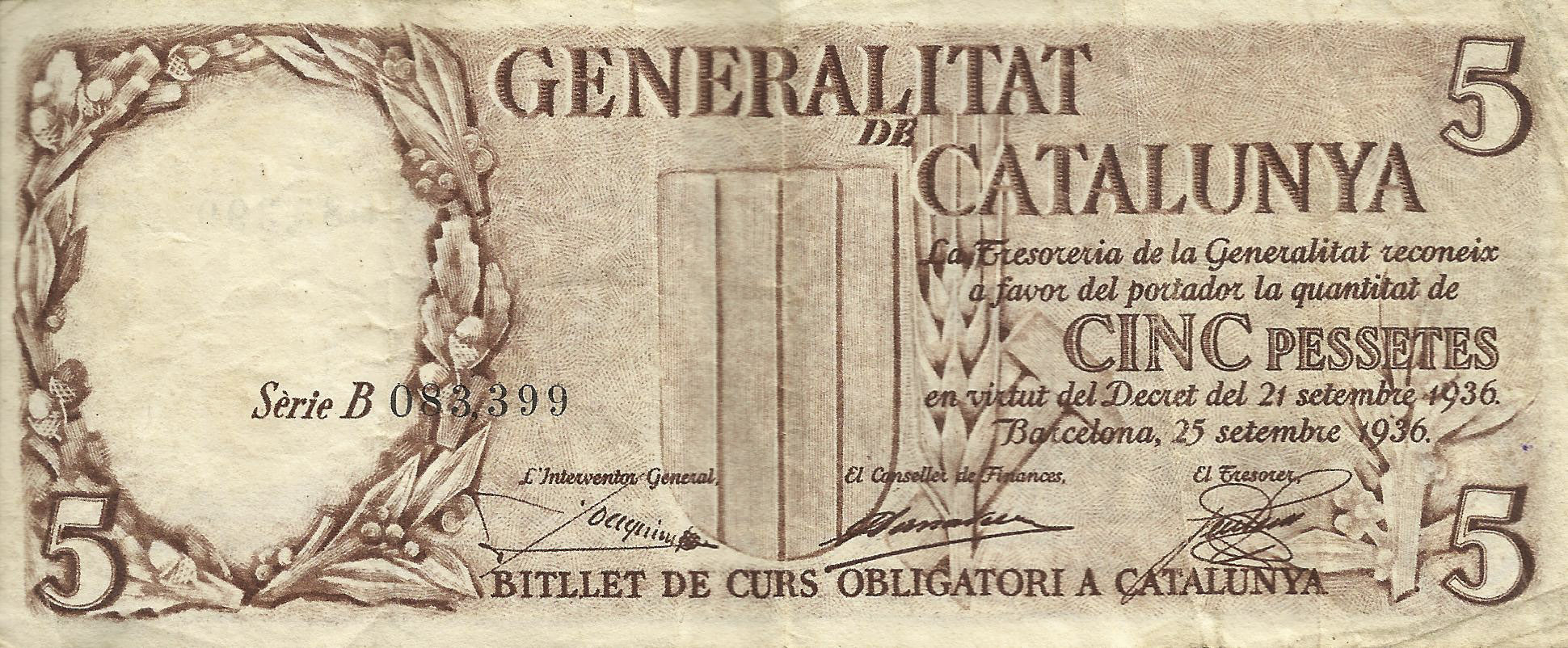
Bank note from the Generalitat de Catalunya, 1936

The Generalitat was restored in the Catalonia under Spanish administration in 1931 during the events of the proclamation of the Second Spanish Republic when Francesc Macià, leader of the Republican Left of Catalonia (ERC), declared the Catalan Republic within an Iberian Federation on 14 April but later reached an agreement with the Spanish ministers, in which the Catalan Republic was renamed Generalitat of Catalonia (Catalan: Generalitat de Catalunya) and given its modern political and representative function as the institution of self-government of Catalonia within the Spanish Republic. The restored Generalitat was ruled by a statute of autonomy approved by the Spanish Cortes in 1932 and included a parliament, a presidency, an executive council and a court of cassation. It was presided by Francesc Macià (1931–1933) and Lluís Companys (1933–1940). The governments of Macià and Companys enacted a progressive agenda, despite the internal difficulties, while fought to demand the complete transfer of the powers estipulated in the Statute.

After the right wing coalition won the Spanish elections in 1933, the leftist leaders of the Generalitat of Catalonia rebelled in October of 1934 against the Spanish authorities, and it was temporarily suspended from 1934 to 1936. After the victory of the left in the Spanish elections of February 1936 the new Spanish government pardoned the Catalan government and the self-government was fully restored.

Throughout the Spanish Civil War (1936–1939) the Generalitat remained loyal to the Republic, assuming powers in areas belonging to the State in Catalonia, such as border controls, coinage, justice and defense. However, due to the revolutionary situation created after the coup d'etat, the Generalitat lost most of the effective power over the territory, largely controlled by local committees under the command of the Central Committee of Antifascist Militias of Catalonia. As the weeks passed, the Catalan government progressively recovered somewhat control until May 1937.

=== Second abolition ===
In 1939, as the Spanish Civil War finished with the defeat of the Republican side, the Generalitat of Catalonia as an institution was abolished and remained so during the Francoist dictatorship until 1975. The president of the Generalitat at the time, Lluís Companys, was tortured and executed on 15 October 1940 for the crime of 'military rebellion'. Nonetheless, the Generalitat maintained its official existence in exile, led by presidents Josep Irla (1940–1954) and Josep Tarradellas (1954–1980).

=== Second restoration ===
The succession of presidents of the Generalitat was maintained in exile from 1939 to 1977, when Josep Tarradellas returned to Catalonia and was recognized as the legitimate president by the Spanish government. Tarradellas, when he returned to Catalonia, made his often quoted remark "Ciutadans de Catalunya: ja sóc aquí" ("Citizens of Catalonia: I am back!"), reassuming the autonomous powers of Catalonia, one of the historic nationalities of present-day Spain.

After this, the powers given to the autonomous Catalan government according to the Spanish Constitution of 1978 were transferred and the Statute of Autonomy of Catalonia (Estatut d'Autonomia) was passed after being approved both by referendum in Catalonia and by the Spanish parliament.

== Recent history ==
=== Governance since 2006 ===
José Montilla, leader of the Catalan Socialist Party, was the president of the Generalitat from the 2006 election until November 2010, leading a tripartite coalition of left-wing and Catalan nationalist political parties.

On 18 June 2006, a reformed version of the Statute of Autonomy of Catalonia was approved by referendum and went into effect 9 August 2006. The reform of the Statute was initially championed by both the leftist parties in the Catalan government and by the main opposition party (CiU), which were united in pushing for increased devolution of powers from the Spanish government level, enhanced fiscal autonomy and finances, and explicit recognition of Catalonia's national identity. However the details of the Statute's final version were harshly fought over and continued to be controversial. At length, the Republican Left of Catalonia (ERC), themselves members of the coalition government, finally opposed the Statute in the referendum.

The Partido Popular then filed an objection of unconstitutionality against more than half the text before the Constitutional Court of Spain (including provisions that had previously been approved in the autonomy statutes of other autonomous communities). Four years later, on 28 June 2010, the Spanish Constitutional Court gave their judgement, annulling 14 articles and dictating the interpretation for 27 more. The Court's decision led to a massive demonstration in Barcelona of more than a million people under the slogan in Catalan Som una nació. Nosaltres decidim (transl. "We are a nation. We decide).

Artur Mas held the office of President of the Generalitat from December 2010 until his resignation in January 2016, leading a minority government dependent on pacts with other parties including the Socialists' Party of Catalonia following the 2010 election and the 2015 election.

Former president Artur Mas was charged by the Spanish government for civil disobedience, after he organised and staged a referendum on independence in 2014.

=== Procés period ===
In 2016, Carles Puigdemont, member of the Catalan European Democratic Party, successor formation to the defunct Convergence and Union alliance. was elected President of the Generalitat of Catalonia. He was suspended from office on 27 October 2017, by the Spanish government.

After a number of attempts to invest a new president, Quim Torra i Pla became president on 17 May 2018, with Together for Catalonia and Republican Left of Catalonia votes in favor. He was subsequently inhabilitated by a spanish court for civil disobedience after refusing to remove a banner in support of the jailed catalan politicians from the main balcony of the Palace of the Generalitat. His vice-president, Pere Aragonès i Garcia became acting president until his own election as president in 2021.

=== Current status ===
On 8 August 2024, Salvador Illa i Roca from the Socialists' Party of Catalonia was elected the 133rd president of the Generalitat following an agreement with the Republican Left of Catalonia and Comuns Sumar.

== Autonomous system of government ==
The autonomous government consists of the Executive Council, the President and the Parliament. Some people wrongly apply this name only to the executive council (the cabinet of the autonomous government); however, Generalitat de Catalunya is the system of Catalan autonomous government as a whole.

The region has gradually achieved a greater degree of autonomy since 1979. After Navarre and the Basque Country regions, Catalonia has the greatest level of self-government in Spain. When it is fully instated, the Generalitat holds exclusive and wide jurisdiction in various matters of culture, environment, communications, transportation, commerce, public safety and local governments. In many aspects relating to education, health and justice, the region shares jurisdiction with the Spanish government.

One of the examples of Catalonia's degree of autonomy is its own police force, the Mossos d'Esquadra ("Auxiliary Force"), which has taken over most of the police functions in Catalonia which used to be served by the Civil Guard (Guardia Civil) and the Spanish National Police Corps.

With few exceptions, most of the justice system is administered by national judicial institutions. The legal system is uniform throughout the Spanish state, with the exception of some parts of civil law – especially family, inheritance, and real estate law – that have traditionally been ruled by so-called foral law. The fields of civil law that are subject to autonomous legislation have been codified in the Civil Code of Catalonia (Codi civil de Catalunya) consisting of six books that have successively entered into force since 2003.

Another institution stemming from the Catalan autonomy statute, but independent from the Generalitat in its check and balance functions, is the Síndic de Greuges (ombudsman) to address problems that may arise between private citizens or organizations and the Generalitat or local governments.

=== Legislature ===
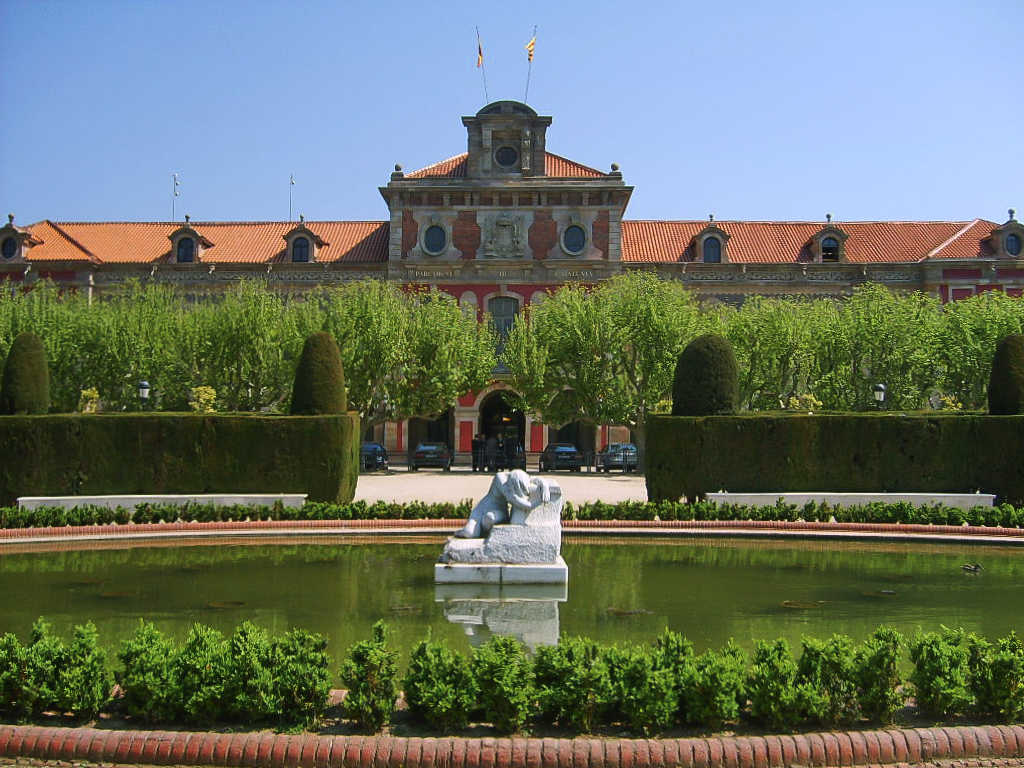
Parliament of Catalonia, located in Ciutadella park, Barcelona

The Parliament of Catalonia (Catalan: Parlament de Catalunya) is the unicameral legislative body of the Generalitat and represents the people of Catalonia. Its 135 members (diputats) are elected by universal suffrage to serve for a four-year period. According to the Statute of Autonomy, it has powers to legislate over devolved matters such as education, health, culture, internal institutional and territorial organization, nomination of the President of the Generalitat and control the Government, budget and other affairs. The last Catalan election was held on 12 May 2024, and its current speaker (president) is Josep Rull, incumbent since 11 June 2024.

=== Presidency ===
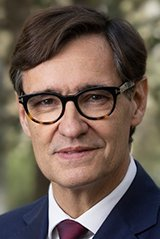
Salvador Illa, President of the Generalitat of Catalonia

The President of the Generalitat of Catalonia (Catalan: president de la Generalitat de Catalunya) is the highest representative of Catalonia, and is also responsible of leading the government's action, presiding the Executive Council. Since the restoration of the Generalitat on the return of democracy in Spain, the Presidents of Catalonia have been Josep Tarradellas (1977–1980, president in exile since 1954), Jordi Pujol (1980–2003), Pasqual Maragall (2003–2006), José Montilla (2006–2010), Artur Mas (2010–2016), Carles Puigdemont (2016–2017) and, after the imposition of direct rule from Madrid, Quim Torra (2018–2020), Pere Aragonès (2020–2024) and Salvador Illa (2024–).

=== Executive ===
The Executive Council (Catalan: Consell Executiu) or Government (Govern), is the body responsible of the government of the Generalitat, it holds executive and regulatory power, being accountable to the Catalan Parliament. It comprises the President of the Generalitat, the First Minister (conseller primer) or the Vice President, and the ministers (consellers) appointed by the president. Its seat is the Palau de la Generalitat, Barcelona. The current government is formed by the center-left pro-independence Republican Left of Catalonia (ERC) after a political crisis in which the center-right member of the coalition Together for Catalonia (Junts) abandoned in 2022 its ministerial seats. It is made up of 14 ministers, alongside to the President and a secretary of government.

== International presence ==
As an autonomous community of Spain, Catalonia is not recognized as a sovereign state by any sovereign state. However, as Catalonia has progressively gained a greater degree of self-government in recent years, the Catalan Government has established nearly bilateral relationships with foreign bodies. For the most part, these relationships are with the governments of other powerful subnational entities such as Quebec or California. In addition, like most Spanish autonomous communities, Catalonia has permanent delegations before international organizations, such as the European Union.

More recently, Catalonia has embarked upon an expansion process of its international representation by opening a number of delegations worldwide. As of 2017, these exceeded 40. Most of these offices are located in major world cities like London, New York City, Los Angeles, Paris, Tokyo and others. Each office has specific duties assigned by their ministry or department agency. Generally, the functions of these are the representation of specific interests of the Government of Catalonia, trade and foreign investment, Catalan culture and language support, tourist promotion, and international cooperation activities.

There are no specific Catalan political institutions in Northern Catalonia, other than the French département of Pyrénées-Orientales. However, since 5 September 2003, there has been a Casa de la Generalitat in Perpignan, which aims to promote the Catalan culture and facilitate exchanges between each side of the Franco–Spanish border.

Under application of article 155 of the Constitution following the constitutional crisis of 2017 Catalonia only retained one delegation abroad, after the rest were closed, this delegation was the one of Brussels, Belgium. The Catalan Government elected after 21 December election began the process to restore the closed delegations, achieving the goal and opening new ones. Currently there are 15 fully deployed delegations.

This is the list of the current delegations of the Government of Catalonia abroad:

- Brussels, Belgium (delegation before the European Union)
- Andorra la Vella, Andorra
- Buenos Aires, Argentina
- Vienna, Austria
- Zagreb, Croatia
- Paris, France
- Berlin, Germany
- Rome, Italy
- Mexico City, Mexico
- Lisbon, Portugal
- Seoul, South Korea
- Stockholm, Sweden
- Geneva, Switzerland
- Tunis, Tunisia
- London, United Kingdom
- Washington, D.C., United States

== See also ==
- Politics of Catalonia
- 2017–2018 Spanish constitutional crisis
- Government of Pere Aragonès, Catalonia Government 2021–2024 term of office
- Commonwealth of Catalonia
- List of presidents of the Government of Catalonia

== Bibliography ==
- Anderson, Paul (2020). "A Consociational Compromise? Constitutional Evolution in Spain and Catalonia". In Keil, S; McCulloch, A (eds.). Power-sharing in Europe: Past practice, present cases and future directions. Springer. pp. 201–225. doi:10.1007/978-3-030-53590-2_9. ISBN 978-3-030-53590-2.
- Arzoz, Xabier (2012). "New developments in Spanish federalism". L'Europe en Formation. 363 (1): 179–188. doi:10.3917/eufor.363.0179. ISSN 2410-9231. OCLC 140465166.
- Carr, Raymond (1980). Modern Spain, 1875-1980. Oxford University Press. ISBN 9780192158284. OCLC 6555498.
- Oiveira, Leo (30 July 2020). Catalan independence. House of Commons Briefing Paper Number CBP 8976 (Report). House of Commons Library.
- Party Urging More Autonomy From Spain Seems to Win in Catalonia Article on New York Times, 2 November 2006
- Courage in Catalonia Article on New York Times, 22 June 2006
- Voters in Catalonia Approve A Plan for Greater Autonomy Article on New York Times, 19 June 2006
- Spain Moves On Law to Give Broad Powers To Catalonia Article on New York Times, 31 March 2006
