= 2007 Andalusian Statute of Autonomy referendum =

Referendum in the Spanish region of Andalusia

- 18 February 2007
- "Do you approve of the Statute of Autonomy of Andalusia Bill?"

Results
| Choice | Votes | % |
|---|---|---|
| Yes | 1,920,944 | 90.23% |
| No | 207,955 | 9.77% |
| Valid votes | 2,128,899 | 95.99% |
| Invalid or blank votes | 88,934 | 4.01% |
| Total votes | 2,217,833 | 100.00% |
| Registered voters/turnout | 6,186,061 | 35.85% |

A referendum on the reform of the Andalusian Statute of Autonomy was held in Andalusia on Sunday, 18 February 2007. Voters were asked whether they ratified a statutory amendment which effectively approved a new Statute of Autonomy of Andalusia. The draft Statute had been submitted to the consideration of the Spanish Cortes Generales at the end of the previous year, where it had been approved in both the Congress of Deputies on 2 November 2006 (with a 306–0 result) and in the Spanish Senate on 20 December (with a 242–0 result).

The question asked was "Do you approve of the Statute of Autonomy of Andalusia Bill?" (Spanish: ¿Aprueba el proyecto de Estatuto de Autonomía para Andalucía?). The referendum resulted in 90.2% of valid votes in support of the bill on a turnout of just 35.9%, and resulted in the approval of a new Statute of Autonomy replacing the 1981 Statute, which received royal assent on 19 March and was published in the Official State Gazette on 20 March 2007.

== Results ==
=== Overall ===
Question

Do you approve of the Statute of Autonomy of Andalusia Bill?

| Choice | Votes | % |
|---|---|---|
| For | 1,920,944 | 90.23 |
| Against | 207,955 | 9.77 |
| Total | 2,128,899 | 100.00 |
| Valid votes | 2,128,899 | 95.99 |
| Invalid/blank votes | 88,934 | 4.01 |
| Total votes | 2,217,833 | 100.00 |
| Registered voters/turnout | 6,186,061 | 35.85 |
Source: Regional Government of Andalusia

=== Results by province ===
| Province | Electorate | Turnout | Yes | | No | |
| Province | Electorate | Turnout | Votes | % | Votes | % |
|---|---|---|---|---|---|---|
| Almería | 444,202 | 31.74 | 119,707 | 88.14 | 16,108 | 11.86 |
| Cádiz | 952,169 | 30.58 | 251,467 | 89.69 | 28,901 | 10.31 |
| Córdoba | 639,725 | 40.30 | 220,793 | 89.34 | 26,337 | 10.66 |
| Granada | 711,534 | 36.10 | 222,716 | 90.16 | 24,301 | 9.84 |
| Huelva | 384,488 | 34.97 | 120,844 | 92.95 | 9,163 | 7.05 |
| Jaén | 529,033 | 43.59 | 206,047 | 92.01 | 17,904 | 7.99 |
| Málaga | 1,065,869 | 32.01 | 295,214 | 89.75 | 33,707 | 10.25 |
| Seville | 1,459,041 | 38.71 | 484,156 | 90.38 | 51,534 | 9.62 |
| Total | 6,186,061 | 35.85 | 1,920,944 | 90.23 | 207,955 | 9.77 |

== See also ==
- 2006 Catalan Statute of Autonomy referendum
