= Ramón Rodríguez Arribas =

Spanish magistrate (1934–2023)

Member of the Constitutional Court of Spain
- In office 2004–2013

Personal details
- Born: 2 April 1934 Madrid, Spain
- Died: 29 October 2023 (aged 89)
- Education: Complutense University of Madrid
- Occupation: Magistrate

Ramón Rodríguez Arribas (2 April 1934 – 29 October 2023) was a Spanish magistrate. He served on the Constitutional Court from 2004 to 2013 and of the Supreme Court between 1978 and 1996.

Rodríguez died on 29 October 2023, at the age of 89.
