= Manuel Jiménez de Parga =

Spanish lawyer, politician and diplomat

Manuel Jiménez de Parga y Cabrera
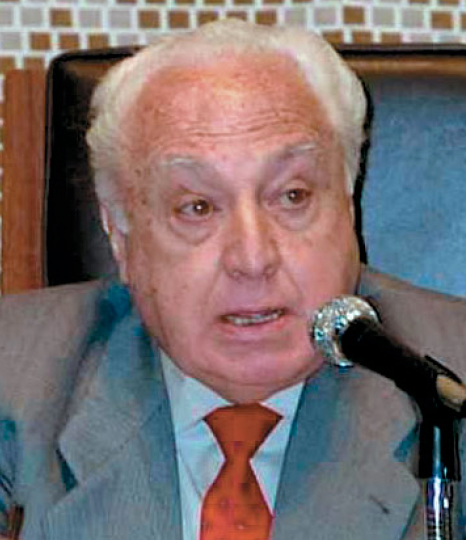
- Jiménez de Parga in 2003

Minister of Labour
- In office 1977–1978

Ambassador-Permanent Representative of Spain to the ILO
- In office 1978–1981

Personal details
- Born: April 9, 1929 Granada, Spain
- Died: May 7, 2014 (aged 85) Madrid, Spain
- Education: University of Madrid, University of Barcelona
- Occupation: Lawyer, Politician, Diplomat
- Known for: President of the Constitutional Court of Spain

Manuel Jiménez de Parga y Cabrera (9 April 1929 – 7 May 2014) was a Spanish lawyer, politician and diplomat. He was president of the Constitutional Court of Spain between 2001 and 2004.

He was professor in charge of the department of political law at the University of Madrid (1956) and professor in opposition of the Faculty of Law of the University of Barcelona (1957–1977). He was Dean of the Faculty of Law (1976) and Rector of the University of Barcelona (1976–1977).

Jiménez de Parga was Minister of Labour (1977–78) and Ambassador-Permanent Representative of Spain to the ILO (Geneva, 1978–1981) and president of the Inter-American Conference of Labour (1980).

He was born in Granada, Spain. Parga died in Madrid, Spain, aged 85.
