= Jesús Leguina =

Spanish jurist and civil servant

Jesús Leguina Villa (1942 – 14 May 2016) was a Spanish jurist and civil servant. He served as a judge of the Constitutional Court of Spain from 1986 until 1990, having previously served as a member of the General Council of the Judiciary. He was then selected as a director of the Bank of Spain, serving from 1994 until 2000 and again from 2004 until 2010. He also served as Vice Chancellor of the University of the Basque Country. He was married to María Emilia Casas, a former President of the Constitutional Court, and had four children.
