= Statute of Autonomy of Catalonia of 1979 =

The Statute of Autonomy of Catalonia (Catalan: Estatut d'Autonomia de Catalunya; also Statute of Sau, Estatut de Sau, after the location where the statute was first made) is a constitutional law defining the nationality of Catalonia as an autonomous community within the Kingdom of Spain. It was promulgated on 18 September 1979. It is one of seventeen such statutes granted, in various forms and capabilities, to the different autonomous communities of Spain since the Spanish transition to democracy of the 1970s.

On 18 June 2006 a referendum approved the adoption of a new statute that expanded the authority of the Catalan government which had been passed by the Spanish Parliament. It became effective on 9 August 2006, replacing the Statute of 1979.

Catalonia first obtained a Statute of Autonomy in 1932, during the Second Spanish Republic. This law was abolished in 1938 by General Francisco Franco at the beginning of the military occupation of Catalonia by his army during the Spanish Civil War, largely because Catalonia had been stronghold of opposition to the Nationalist forces, and during his rule Catalan culture, language, and self-rule were harshly suppressed.

== Self-government under the statute ==
The Generalitat de Catalunya is the institution in which the self-government of Catalonia is politically organised. It consists of the Parliament, the President of the Generalitat and the Executive Council or Government of Catalonia.

Catalonia has gradually achieved a greater degree of autonomy since 1979. The Generalitat holds exclusive jurisdiction in various matters of culture, environment, communications, transportation, commerce, public safety and local governments, but in education and health, the Catalan government shares jurisdiction with the Spanish government. Catalonia has its own police force, the Mossos d'Esquadra (literally 'squad lads'), which is currently in the process of taking over most of the role within Catalonia of the Guardia Civil and Policía Nacional, which are under the authority of the Spanish national government, although the Spanish government will keep agents in the region for matters relating to terrorism and immigration. Most of the justice system is administered by national judicial institutions. The legal system is uniform throughout the Spanish State, with the exception of so-called "civil law" (private law), which is administered separately within Catalonia.

As an autonomous community of Spain, Catalonia has no official status or recognition at an international level.

== See also ==
- Catalonia
- Generalitat de Catalunya
- Autonomous communities of Spain
- Spanish transition to democracy
- Statute of Autonomy
