= Statute of Autonomy of Andalusia =

Emblem of Andalusia.

The Statute of Autonomy of Andalusia is a law hierarchically located under the 1978 Constitution of Spain, and over any legislation passed by the Andalusian Autonomous Government. During the Spanish transition to democracy, Andalusia was the one region of Spain to take its path to autonomy under what was called the "vía rápida" ("fast way") allowed for by Article 151 of the 1978 Constitution. That article was set out for regions like Andalusia that had been prevented by the outbreak of the Spanish Civil War from adopting a statute of autonomy during the period of the Second Spanish Republic. Following this procedure, Andalusia was constituted as an autonomous community February 28, 1980. The regional holiday of the Andalusia Day commemorates that date. The statute was approved the following year by the Spanish national government.

== 1981 Statute of Autonomy ==
Article 1 of the original Andalusian Statute of Autonomy, also known as the Statute of Carmona (Spanish: Estatuto de Carmona) declares that Andalusian autonomy is justified by the "historical identity, on the self-government that the Constitution permits every nationality, on outright equality to the rest of the nationalities and regions that compose Spain, and with a power that emanates from the Andalusian Constitution and people, reflected in its Statute of Autonomy."

The Statute declared Blas Infante the "Father of the Andalusian Homeland" ("Padre de la Patria Andaluza"). The Statute of Autonomy spells out Andalusia's distinct institutions of government and administration. Chief among these is the Andalusian Autonomous Government (Junta de Andalucía). Other institutions specified in the Statute are the Defensor del Pueblo Andaluz (lit. 'Defender of the Andalusian People', basically an ombudsperson), the Consultative Council, the Chamber of Accounts, the Audiovisual Council of Andalusia, and the Economic and Social Council.

== 2007 Statute of Autonomy ==
In October 2006, the constitutional commission of the Cortes Generales (the national legislature of Spain), with favorable votes from the left-of-center Spanish Socialist Workers' Party (PSOE), the leftist United Left (IU) and the right-of-center People's Party (PP), approved a new Statute of Autonomy of Andalusia.

On November 2, 2006, the Spanish Chamber Deputies ratified the text of the Constitutional Commission with 306 votes in favor, none opposed, and 2 abstentions. This was the first time a Spanish Organic Law adopting a Statute of Autonomy was approved with no opposing votes. The Senate, in a plenary session of December 20, 2006, ratified the referendum to be voted upon by the Andalusian public.

The new statute speaks of Andalusia as a "historic nationality" (Spanish: nacionalidad histórica). It also cites the 1919 Andalusian nationalist Manifesto of Córdoba describing Andalusia as a "national reality" (realidad nacional), but does not endorse that formulation. Article 1 of the earlier 1981 Statute of Autonomy defined it simply as a "nationality" (nacionalidad).

On February 18, 2007, the statute was put to a referendum. The portion of the Andalusian populace (a turnout of 35.85%) that went to the polls overwhelmingly approved the new statute.

In October 2006 the constitutional commission of the Cortes Generales (the national legislature of Spain), with favorable votes from the PSOE, the IU and the PP, approved a new Statute of Autonomy for Andalusia, whose preamble refers to the community as a "national reality" (realidad nacional):

The Andalusianist Manifesto of Córdoba described Andalusia as a national reality in 1919, whose spirit the Andalusians took up outright through the process of self-government recognized in our Magna Carta. In 1978 the Andalusians broadly backed the constitutional consensus. Today, the Constitution, in its Article 2, recognizes Andalusia as a nationality as part of the indissoluble unity of the Spanish nation.

— Andalusian Statute of Autonomy on Wikisource, in Spanish

On November 2, 2006, the Spanish Chamber Deputies ratified the text of the Constitutional Commission with 306 votes in favor, none opposed, and 2 abstentions. This was the first time a Spanish Organic Law adopting a Statute of Autonomy was approved with no opposing votes. The Senate, in a plenary session of December 20, 2006, ratified the referendum to be voted upon by the Andalusian public February 18, 2007.

The Statute of Autonomy spells out Andalusia's distinct institutions of government and administration. Chief among these is the Andalusian Autonomous Government (Junta de Andalucía). Other institutions specified in the Statute are the Defensor del Pueblo Andaluz (literally "Defender of the Andalusian People", basically an ombudsperson), the Consultative Council, the Chamber of Accounts, the Audiovisual Council of Andalusia, and the Economic and Social Council.

The Andalusian Statute of Autonomy recognizes Seville as the region's capital.

The new Statute of Autonomy was promulgated March 19, 2007.
