= Statute of Autonomy of Catalonia of 2006 =

Spanish legislation (2006)

The Statute of Autonomy of Catalonia of 2006 (Catalan: Estatut d'Autonomia de Catalunya) provides Catalonia's basic institutional regulations under the Spanish Constitution of 1978. It defines the rights and obligations of the citizens of Catalonia, the political institutions of the Catalan community, their powers and relations with the rest of Spain and the European Union, and the financing of the Government of Catalonia.

This Law was passed by Spanish Parliament on 19 July 2006 and approved by referendum of the citizens of Catalonia on 18 June 2006 and replaced the 1979 Statute of Sau. The new statute sought to achieve clarification of powers and their protection from encroachment by the State, increased executive, legislative and fiscal powers and the recognition of Catalan nationhood. Although turnout at the referendum was low at 49.4%, approval was given by 73.9% and came into effect 9 August 2006.

The conservative opposition party in Spanish Parliament, the People's Party (PP), appealed immediately to the Constitutional Court of Spain on grounds of unconstitutionality of more than half of the Law. Four years after the Statute had been promulgated, on 28 June 2010, the Court made its judgement, annulling 14 articles and dictating the interpretation for 27 more. That led to a massive demonstration in Barcelona of more than a million people and, ultimately a consultation on self-determination in 2014 and the constitutional crisis of 2017–2018.

== History ==
In 1919, a first Statute was drafted by the Commonwealth of Catalonia although it was rejected by Spanish Cortes Generales. In 1928, a draft Constitution was written in Havana by exiled Catalan nationalists.

Catalonia first obtained a Statute of Autonomy in 1932, during the Second Spanish Republic. This law was abolished by General Francisco Franco after the Spanish Civil War, largely because Catalonia had been a region generally opposed to Franco's Nacionales forces. During periods of his rule, public usage of the Catalan language and culture, and more specifically, Catalan self-government were harshly suppressed.

In 1979, during the Spanish transition to democracy, the second Statute was approved by referendum.

On 18 June 2006, a referendum approved a new statute that had been passed into law by the Spanish Parliament and it thus became effective on 9 August 2006.

=== Amendment process ===
In 2003, an uneasy left-wing coalition formed government in Catalonia and set a goal to amend the Statute of Autonomy. As the Constitution had not set clearly defined methods for power sharing, particularly over shared jurisdiction or powers, there had been major conflict as the real power in Catalonia (as in other communities) depended upon how far the State wanted to legislate. Since 1982, the PSOE and later the PP pursued policies to temper enthusiasm for devolution and instead sought to harmonise the powers devolved to all autonomous communities. This was interpreted by the 'historic nationalities' of Catalonia and the Basque Country as the re-imposition of centralist control from Madrid particularly after a landmark ruling of the Constitutional Court upheld the prerogative of the central government to use Basic Laws to encroach upon devolved jurisdictional powers to promote and protect 'the national interest' of the Spanish state.

On 30 September 2005, the Catalan Parliament approved (with the support of 120 deputies to 15) a new draft Statute of Autonomy. The approved proposal was sent to the Cortes Generales (Spain's parliament) on 2 November 2005. After receiving the proposal the Spanish Congress of Deputies approved the admission of A bill to reform the Statute of Autonomy of Catalonia with the support of all the groups except the opposition People's Party (PP).

The subsequent (constitutionally required) negotiations with the constitutional committee of Spanish Parliament led to amendments of some two thirds of the draft. The new text led one of the Catalan coalition government parties, Esquerra Republicana de Catalunya (ERC), to cease support for the new statute. Simultaneously, from January to April 2006 then opposition leader, Mariano Rajoy organised a signature campaign demanding a referendum on the new Statute, rather than the normal process of parliamentary majority.

On 10 May 2006, the amended text passed through its final reading through both Houses of the Parliament, with the support of all parties except both the Spanish main opposition party, the conservative People's Party, and the Catalan independentist party Esquerra Republicana de Catalunya (ERC) for opposite reasons. ERC voted against the bill in the Spanish Congress of Deputies but abstained in the Senate so that it would still pass. ERC voted against it, despite its senior members having had a hand in drafting its content, due to the internal tensions within the party which this issue had brought to the surface.

On Sunday 18 June the Statute was put to referendum of the Catalan people. The referendum approved the Statute, the "yes" side receiving 73.23% of votes cast. The voter turnout was 49.41% of the total electorate, a relatively low figure for this type of vote, in other words 36% of Catalan people with the right to vote. The new statute came into effect 9 August 2006.

Just as they had done in the Spanish Parliament, the PP and ERC, for opposite reasons, supported a no vote in the referendum. ERC claimed the low voter turnout was a response to the changes made to the original draft submitted to the Spanish Parliament. In the Catalan parliament, ERC's opposition raised tensions within the coalition government which led to an early regional election in 2006.

=== Comparison of referendum results ===
- The 1931 referendum on the Statute of Autonomy registered a voter turnout of 75.13%, of which 99.49% voted favourably to its passing, according to the official results released.
- The 1979 referendum on the Statute of Autonomy registered a voter turnout of 59.7%, of which 88.1% voted favorably.
- The 2006 referendum on the current version of the Statute registered a voter turnout of 49.41%. Of the total votes, 73.23% were in favour of the new Statute, while 20.57% were against.

== Self-government under the statute ==
Catalonia is an Autonomous Community within the Kingdom of Spain, with the status of nationality in the Spanish Constitution of 1978. In September 2005, the Parliament of Catalonia approved the definition of Catalonia as a 'nation' in the preamble of the new Statute of Autonomy (autonomous basic law).

The 120 delegates of all parties (CiU, PSC, ERC, ICV-EA) with the exception of the 15 delegates of the Partido Popular approved this definition. In the opinion of the Spanish Government this has a 'declaratory' but not a 'legal' value, since the Spanish Constitution recognises the indissoluble "unity of the Spanish Nation".

The Generalitat de Catalunya is the institution in which the self-government of Catalonia is politically organised. It consists of the Parliament, the President of the Generalitat, and the Executive Council or Government of Catalonia.

The Statute of Autonomy gives the Generalitat of Catalonia the powers that enable it to carry out the functions of self-government. These can be exclusive, concurrent, and shared with the Spanish State or executives. The Generalitat holds jurisdiction in various matters of culture, education, health, justice, environment, communications, transportation, commerce, public safety, and local governments. Catalonia has its own police force, the Mossos d'Esquadra, although the Spanish government keep agents in the region for matters relating to border control, terrorism and immigration.

Most of the justice system is administered by Spanish judicial institutions. The legal system is uniform throughout Spain, with the exception of so-called "civil law", which is administered separately within Catalonia.

=== Differences with the Statute of 1979 ===
The new statute sought to achieve clarification of powers and their protection from encroachment by the State, increased executive, legislative and fiscal powers and the recognition of Catalan nationhood.

The overlaps and lack of clarity in how to share the powers ascribed to Autonomous Communities and the State in the Constitution had led to major conflicts and Constitutional Court determinations usually in favour of the State. The new Statute tried to define with precision every section and subsection of these powers to prevent future conflicts and give legal security in the division of powers.

The most notable changes were:

- Definition of Catalonia as a nation in the preamble of the law, while in the 1979 Statute, Article 1 the definition was as a "nationality"
- Regulation of the national symbols of Catalonia: the flag, the national anthem, and the national day.
- Introduction of historical rights as one of the legal basis of self-government.
- Reinforcement of Catalan language as the proper language of Catalonia, establishing it the main language of Catalan administration and introducing the duty of Catalan citizens to learn it, alongside the Spanish language. The Occitan language (Aranese in Val d'Aran) is also recognized as an official language of Catalonia.
- Creation of an entire chapter (Title I) dedicated to the rights and obligations of Catalan citizens, apart from the ones of the Spanish Constitution.
- Establishment of Vegueries as the new territorial division of Catalonia, suppression of the four Provincial Councils.
- Reinforcement of the powers of the High Court of Justice of Catalonia. Establishment of the High Prosecutor of Catalonia and the Council of Justice of Catalonia.
- Powers of the Generalitat over new matters and better definition of them, which included:
  - Religious entities
  - Landscapes
  - Popular consultations, except referendums
  - Maritime safety
  - Attention and initial support for immigrants
  - Transportation that circulates entirely through Catalan territory
  - Labour inspection
- Establishment of bilateral relations between the Generalitat and Spanish Government.
- Definition of foreign activity of Catalonia. Recognition of delegations of the Catalan government abroad.
- Extension of financing powers:
  - Creation of the Tax Agency of Catalonia, which collects and manages the own taxes of the Generalitat and those totally granted by the State
  - Increase in participation of State taxes (IRPF, IVA, Society tax)
  - Regulation of State investments in Catalonia

== Criticism ==
Spanish nationalist political parties, such as Cs and PP have pointed out what they describe as an "identity obsession" amongst Catalan nationalist politicians and the Catalan media establishment. They quote the unprecedentedly high abstention in the referendum regarding the Statute as a symptom of those cited sectors being out of sync with the populace at large.

On the opposite side, Catalan nationalists, such as CiU, Republican Left of Catalonia (ERC), or CUP, said that the Statute does not give Catalonia sufficient self-government after it was modified by the Constitutional Court of Spain. They claim the Statute that was brought to referendum differed substantially from the one the Constitutional Court delivered on points considered key by these parties, starting the first massive Catalan demonstrations in favor of the Catalan independence.

== Legal challenge and the Catalans' response ==
In an unprecedented move, immediately after the Statute's proclamation, the Partido Popular filed an objection of unconstitutionality against more than half the text before the Constitutional Court of Spain (including provisions that had previously been approved in the autonomy statutes of other autonomous communities). Its constitutionality was also contested by some intellectuals and journalists related to liberal or conservative media such as the COPE (Catholic radio network) and the Madrid-based newspapers El Mundo and La Razón.

Elements of the Statute were legally contested by the surrounding Autonomous Communities of Aragon, Balearic Islands, and the Valencian Community concerning financing, water policy and the archives of the Crown of Aragaon. The objections are based on various topics such as disputed cultural heritage but, especially, on the Statute's alleged breaches of the "solidarity between regions" principle in fiscal and educational matters enshrined by the Constitution.

The Catalan polity was outraged by the extent and nature of the challenge because the Statute had been negotiated and agreed in State and Catalan parliaments and ratified by referendum. The Catalan political arena largely viewed this debate as a sort of cultural war waged by "Spanish nationalists" (espanyolistes in Catalan). In response, in May 2010, four of the six political parties in the Catalan parliament (Convergence and Union, the Catalan Socialists, Republican Left of Catalonia, and Catalan green party), which then represented 88% of the electorate, agreed present together in the Spanish Senate a reform of the Constitutional Court of Spain to stop it overturning the Statute of Autonomy. The pact was unusual because, aside from the fact that they all pertain to various degrees of Catalan nationalism, the four parties differ greatly in political ideology and together form nearly 80% of the Catalan Parliament. However, this attempt was largely unsuccessful.

After four years of deliberations, on the 28th June, the Constitutional Court of Spain made its binding assessment. By a 6 to 4 majority, the Court's justices annulled 14 articles and dictated the interpretation for 27 more, mainly those relating to language, justice and fiscal policy. Although the majority of the articles appealed were declared compatible with Constitution the Court's caveats and interpretations undermined the aims and basic structure of the new statute.

The judgement dictated that the term "nation" used in the preamble has no legal standing. It also abolished all the mechanisms that had been put in place to minimize the distortionary effects of the existing Spanish tax and transfer system suggesting that to make the fiscal model in Catalonia like that of Navarra and the Basque Country would require an amendment to the constitution. The Court also declared that the attempt to clarify the powers between the State and Catalonia does not prevent action by the State because this is a matter only for the Constitution and the interpretation of the Court, effectively closing the door on attempts at clarification.

The legitimacy of the Courts decision has been questioned in Catalonia: the term of three of the twelve members of the Court had already expired when a decision had been made; a fourth member had died and the Spanish Parliament had not appointed the four successors due to the Spanish General Council of the Judiciary blockade.

== Repercussions ==
It is generally agreed that the Constitutional Court's decision has come at a high cost for Court's prestige and perceived legitimacy. Following the decision, Catalan public opinion grew increasingly favorable to hold a referendum to decide whether Catalonia should become an independent state from Spain. According to one author,

[the judgement] marked the beginnings of the use of the courts to frustrate Catalan demands for greater autonomy. The PP made this a cornerstone to their approach in dealing with Catalonia once in power between 2011–2018.

The Court's decision initially led to a massive demonstration in Barcelona of more than a million people under the slogan in Catalan Som una nació. Nosaltres decidim (transl. "We are a nation. We decide).

Between 2009 and 2011 a series of a series of non-binding and unofficial referendums or "popular votes" (consultes populars), took place in municipalities around Catalonia.

In 2013, according to the Spanish Agency (Centro de Investigaciones Sociológicas), 40.6% of Catalans were in favor of independence and 25.7% in favor of achieving more self-government, while 17.6% would be happy in the current situation and 9.1% of them would prefer to have less autonomy. According to the Catalan Agency (Centre d'Estudis d'Opinió), in the event of a referendum there would have been 55.6% of Catalans in favor of independence and 23.4% of them voting against it. The remaining percentages in either poll were still undecided.

In 2014, the Catalan government also tried to hold a referendum on the issue.

Polls in 2017 suggested that support for independence had gone down slowly and steadily from its peak in 2012–13, with only 41% in favor of independence vs 49% against it. Regardless of the polls, when it came to the referendum, where, despite an estimated 770,000 votes being confiscated by the police, the voters overwhelmingly supported independence: 90.18% voting in favor, and only 7.83% voting against (however, with a voter turnout of just 43%).

The situation developed into the 2017–2018 Spanish constitutional crisis.

== Implications for Constitutional Reform ==
Prior to the Constitutional Courts decision, the system of negotiating bi-laterally an autonomous community's powers with the central government was seen as a flexible sub-constitutional method of reform and the best way to accommodate a country perceived by some as multinational. For example, the process of reform of the Catalan Statute of Autonomy triggered and influenced reform of several other statutes which have been modified including those of Valencia (2006), Balearic Islands (2007), Andalucía (2007), Aragón (2007), Castile and León (2007), Navarra (2010), and Extremadura (2011), all agreed by the parliament and the two main Spanish parties.

However the Constitutional Court has, by its judgement in 2010, invalidated this politically agreed implicit constitutional change and led to a debate on the emergence of a new model of federalism in Spain.

For some, the court's intervention is seen as safeguarding the previous constitutional consensus. However most constitutional lawyers in Catalonia believe that the judgement means the end of constitutional flexibility that had emerged. The resulting model will be incapable of satisfying the demands of a true plurinational state and will prove to be a new towards increased demands for shared sovereignty or outright secession.

== See also ==
- Catalonia
- Generalitat de Catalunya
- Autonomous communities of Spain
- Spanish transition to democracy
- Statute of autonomy
- 2006 Constitutional Court Ruling on the Statute of Autonomy of Catalonia
- 2010 Catalan autonomy protest
- History of political Catalanism

== Bibliography ==
- Anderson, Paul (2020). "A Consociational Compromise? Constitutional Evolution in Spain and Catalonia". In Keil, S; McCulloch, A (eds.). Power-sharing in Europe: Past practice, present cases and future directions. Springer. pp. 201–225. doi:10.1007/978-3-030-53590-2_9. ISBN 978-3-030-53590-2.
- Arzoz, Xabier (2012). "New developments in Spanish federalism". L'Europe en Formation. 363 (1): 179–188. doi:10.3917/eufor.363.0179. ISSN 2410-9231. OCLC 140465166.
- Casanas Adam, Elisenda (2017). "The Constitutional Court of Spain: From System Balancer to Polarizing Centralist". In Aroney, Nicholas; Kincaid, John (eds.). Courts in Federal Countries. University of Toronto Press. pp. 367–403. ISBN 978-1-4875-1466-2. JSTOR 10.3138/j.ctt1whm97c.16.
- Colino, César (2017). "Living with Contradictions in Federalism: goals and outcomes of recent constitutional and financial reforms in the Spanish Estado autonómico". In Skogstad, Grace; Banting, Keith; Cameron, David; Papillon, Martin (eds.). The Global Promise of Federalism. University of Toronto Press. pp. 214–235. ISBN 9781442619197. OCLC 1004879919.
- López Bofill, Héctor (25 September 2014). "The Limits of Constitutionalism: Politics, Economics and Secssionism in Catalonia (2006–2013)". In Lluch, Jaime (ed.). Constitutionalism and the politics of accommodation in multinational democracies. Palgrave Macmillan. ISBN 978-1137288998. OCLC 891365744.
- Oiveira, Leo (30 July 2020). Catalan independence. House of Commons Briefing Paper Number CBP 8976 (Report). House of Commons Library.
- Olmeda Gomez, Jose A.; Colino, César (2012). "The Limits of Flexibility for Constitutional Change and the Uses of Sub-national Constitutional Space". In Benz, Arthur; Knüpling, Felix (eds.). Changing Federal Institutions. Lessons from International Comparison. Barbara Budrich. pp. 191–209. doi:10.2307/j.ctvddzh07.14.
