= 2006 Catalan Statute of Autonomy referendum =

Referendum in the Spanish region of Catalonia

- 18 June 2006
- "Do you approve of the Statute of Autonomy of Catalonia Bill?"

Results
Choice	Votes	%
Yes	1,899,897	78.07%
No	533,742	21.93%
Valid votes	2,433,639	93.81%
Invalid or blank votes	160,528	6.19%
Total votes	2,594,167	100.00%
Registered voters/turnout	5,310,103	48.85%

A referendum on the reform of the Catalan Statute of Autonomy was held in Catalonia on Sunday, 18 June 2006. Voters were asked whether they ratified a statutory amendment which effectively approved a new Statute of Autonomy of Catalonia. The draft Statute had been submitted to the consideration of the Spanish Cortes Generales earlier in the year, where it had been approved in both the Congress of Deputies on 30 March (with a 189–154 result) and in the Spanish Senate on 10 May (with a 128–125 result).

The question asked was "Do you approve of the Statute of Autonomy of Catalonia Bill?" (Catalan: Aprova el Projecte d'Estatut d'Autonomia de Catalunya?). The referendum resulted in 78.1% of valid votes in support of the bill on a turnout of 48.9%, and resulted in the approval of a new Statute of Autonomy replacing the 1979 Statute, which received royal assent on 19 July and was published in the Official State Gazette on 20 July 2006.

== Results ==
Question

Do you approve of the Statute of Autonomy of Catalonia Bill?

Choice	Votes	%
For	1,899,897	78.07
Against	533,742	21.93
Total	2,433,639	100.00
Valid votes	2,433,639	93.81
Invalid/blank votes	160,528	6.19
Total votes	2,594,167	100.00
Registered voters/turnout	5,310,103	48.85
Source: Government of Catalonia

=== Results by province ===
Province	Electorate	Turnout	Yes		No	
Province	Electorate	Turnout	Votes	%	Votes	%
Barcelona	3,986,210	48.69	1,422,609	78.03	400,571	21.97
Girona	482,010	50.32	178,813	79.47	46,203	20.53
Lleida	310,990	50.54	116,468	79.32	30,374	20.68
Tarragona	530,893	47.75	182,007	76.28	56,594	23.72
Total	5,310,103	48.85	1,899,897	78.07	533,742	21.93

== See also ==
- 2007 Andalusian Statute of Autonomy referendum
