= Presidency of Michel Temer =

2016–2019 Brazilian presidential administration

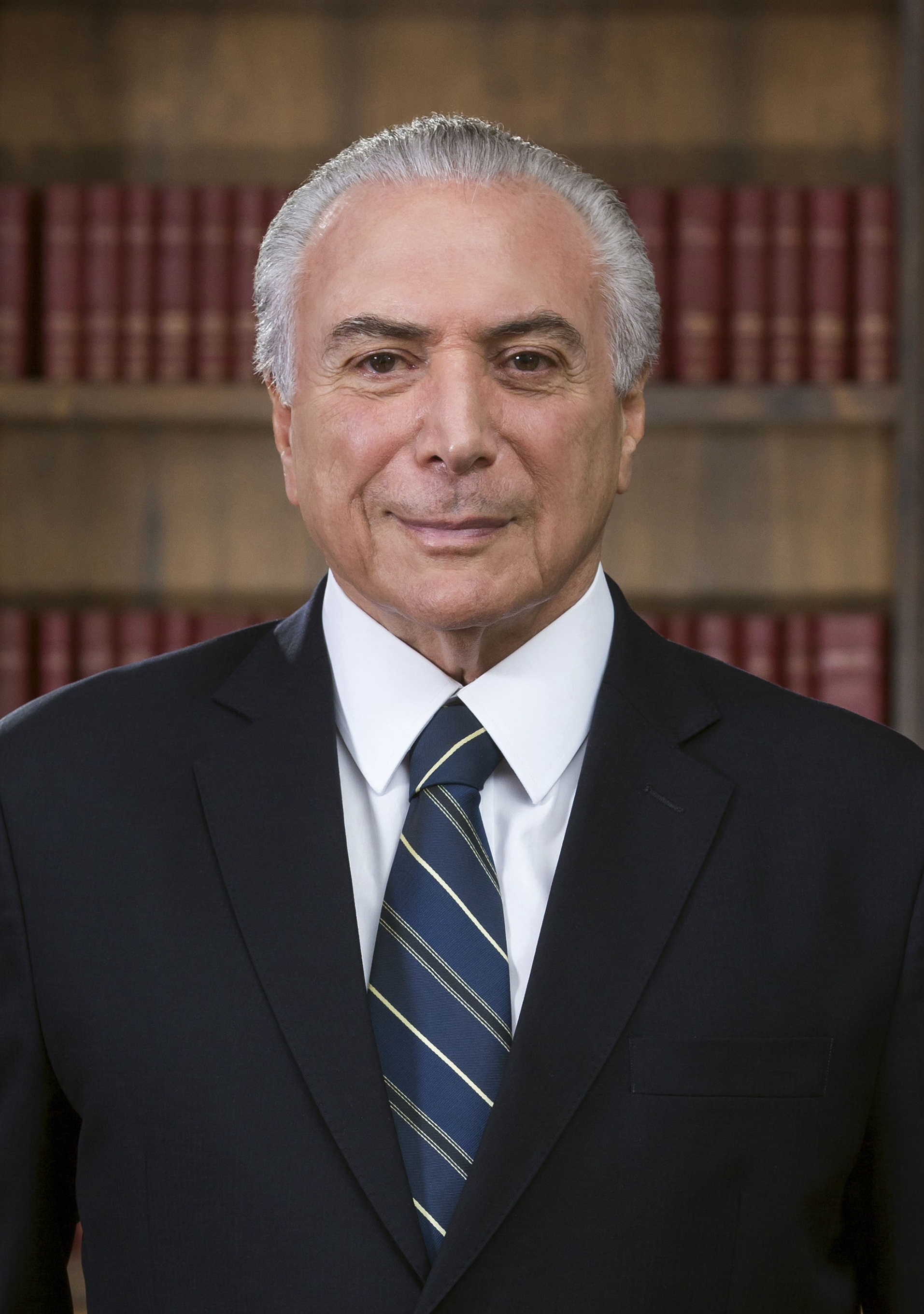
- Presidency of Michel Temer; 31 August 2016 – 1 January 2019
- Vice President: None
- Cabinet: Full list
- Party: MDB
- Seat: Alvorada Palace; Jaburu Palace

Michel Temer's tenure as the 37th president of Brazil began on 12 May 2016 and ended on 1 January 2019.

It began when Temer as vice-president, temporarily assumed the powers and duties of the presidency after the temporary removal of president Dilma Rousseff's powers and duties, as a result of the acceptance of the impeachment process by the Federal Senate. Once the process was concluded, on 31 August 2016, Temer assumed the presidency (upon Rousseff's removal from office). He was succeeded by Jair Bolsonaro.

Temer became president in the midst of a serious economic crisis in the country. At his inauguration, he stated that his government would be a reformist one. During his administration, several economic measures were approved, such as the control of public spending, through Constitutional Amendment No. 95, which imposed limits on future federal government spending, the 2017 labour reform and the Outsourcing Law. There was also a proposed social security reform, which the government failed to push through. Changes were made in the social field, such as the completion and inauguration of part of the São Francisco River transposition project, the reform of high school education and the establishment of the National Common Curriculum Base.

While Temer was in office, the involvement of allies, ministers and the president himself in corruption scandals caused controversy. Despite this, the government managed to maintain a solid base in Congress, which made it possible to approve reforms "necessary to stimulate economic growth", according to him. However, the administration was accused of backtracking by organizations and experts, particularly in the social and environmental areas and in the indigenous issues. According to opinion polls by different institutes, the government had the lowest popular approval rating in the country's history.

According to data from the Central Bank, the IBGE, Caged and the São Paulo Stock Exchange, during his two years in office, the government reduced the interest rate from 14.25% to 6.50% a year; inflation fell from 9.32% to 2.76%; the unemployment rate rose from 11.2% to 13.1%; the dollar rose from 3.47 to 3.60 reais and the Bovespa index rose from 48,471 points to 85,190 points. Temer benefited from the improvement in his government's economic indices to record a video talking about good news in the economy and comparing it to the economic data from the Dilma government. "With these resources, the government will close the accounts for 2018 and guarantee compliance with the so-called golden rule," said Temer, adding that "Petrobras reached the highest market value in its history, 312.5 billion reais" and that Brazil "was considered by 2,500 top executives from around the world to be the second main destination for foreign investment in the main industrial sectors". Temer also said that in 2017, the Correios made a profit of 667 million reais. "This, by the way, is the first profit since 2013, when the company began to record consecutive losses until 2016," said the president.

== Inauguration ==
Temer took office twice, the first time as vice-president alongside Rousseff in 2015, and the second time in 2016 when he took over the government permanently.

=== Inauguration as interim president ===
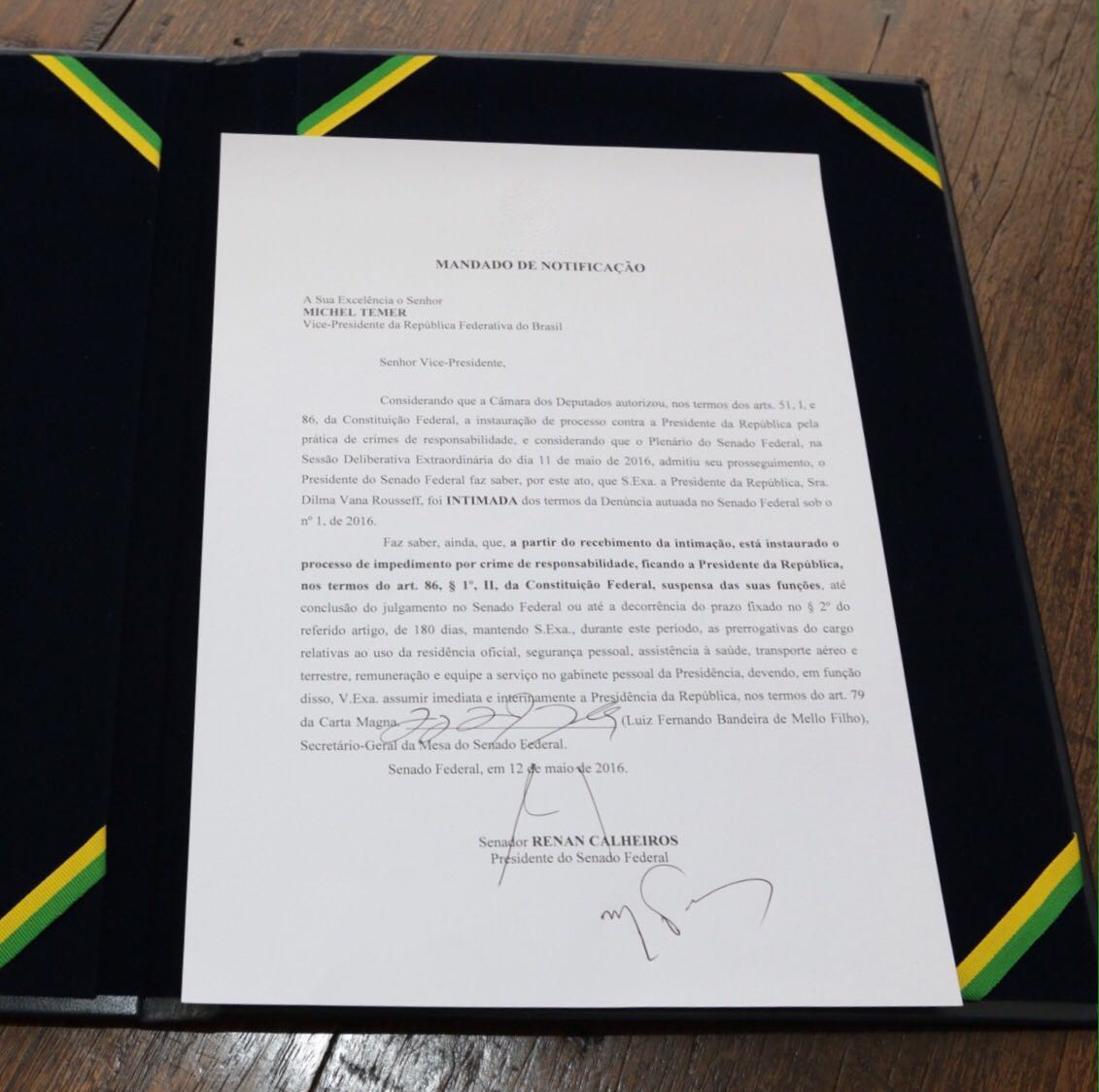
Notification of Dilma Rousseff's removal by the Federal Senate

By 55 votes to 22, at 6:34 a.m. on 12 May 2016, the Federal Senate decided to open impeachment proceedings against Rousseff, based on the indications that she had committed a crime of responsibility. On the same day, Dilma was officially informed of the Senate's decision and her consequent removal from the presidency of the Republic until the trial of the process. Vice President Temer was also notified that he would take over the presidency on an interim basis for a maximum of 180 days. The government's slogan was simply the positivist phrase "Order and Progress", as in the national flag.

==== First days in office ====
On 12 May 2016, Temer appointed Henrique Meirelles to the Ministry of Finance, who was seen as an advocate of a more orthodox position in economics, unlike his predecessor in the post, Nelson Barbosa, more identified with a developmentalist line and one of those responsible for creating the new economic matrix in the Dilma government (based on the tripod of low interest rates, a competitive exchange rate and "investment-friendly" fiscal consolidation). Meirelles defended less government intervention in the economy and greater openness to foreign trade, as well as supporting spending controls to improve public accounts, as a way of providing stability in the debt/GDP ratio in the future and increasing investor confidence in the Brazilian economy.

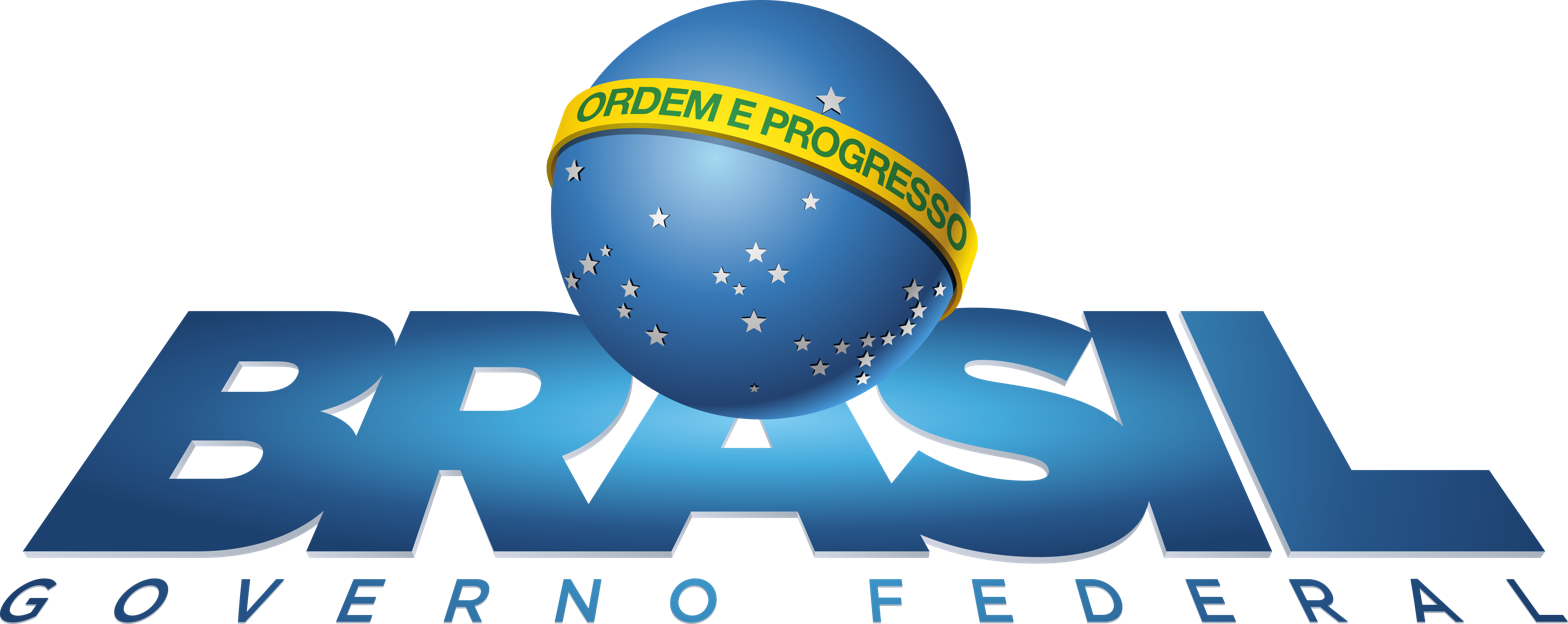
Temer government logo created by Elsinho Mouco before taking office

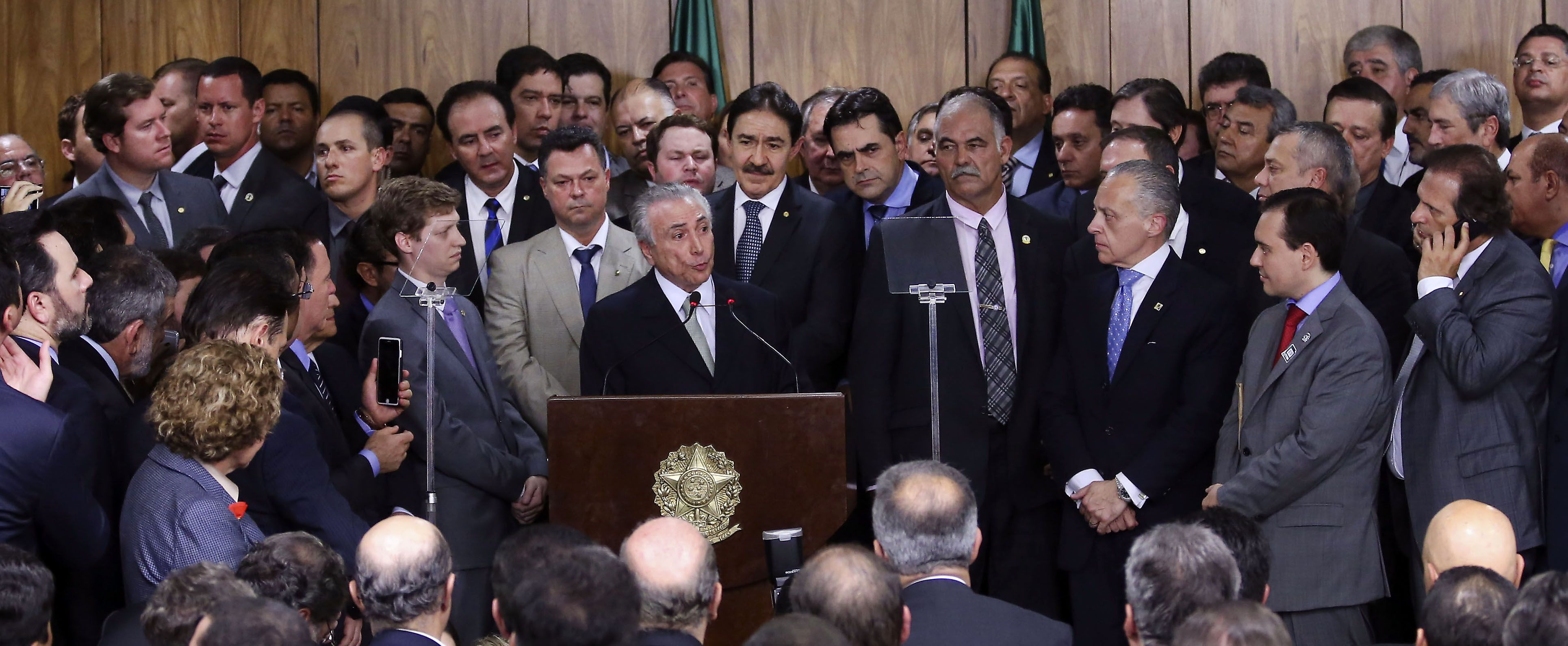
Inauguration of the first ministry of Temer's government on 16 May 2016

In an interview with the TV programme Fantástico on 15 May 2016, Temer responded to criticism about the lack of women in his team and said that he still intended to have at least four women in the ministries. In addition, his wife, Marcela Temer, should carry out all the social activities in his government. Regarding social security, he announced changes so that pensioners would not suffer in the future, but assured that these measures would not affect acquired rights, although these are not always affected by transitional rules. Temer also declared that he would maintain social programmes, guaranteeing the survival of the neediest, even if he had to cut funds from other sectors. Regarding re-election, he said that he did not intend to run, but that he could eventually be a candidate.

One of Temer's first measures was to abolish the Ministries of Culture, Communications and Women, Racial Equality and Human Rights. He also abolished the Military House of the presidency, the Ministry of Agrarian Development and the Office of the Comptroller General. The Ministry of Culture was merged with the Ministry of Education, while the Ministry of Women, Racial Equality and Human Rights was attached to the Ministry of Justice and Citizenship. The Office of the Comptroller General was transformed into the Ministry of Transparency, Supervision and Control. Many artists and intellectuals, such as Wagner Moura and Wolf Maya, spoke out against the end of the Ministry of Culture. On 21 May, Temer recreated the ministry, under the command of Marcelo Calero, who until then had been appointed Secretary of Culture, linked to the Ministry of Education.

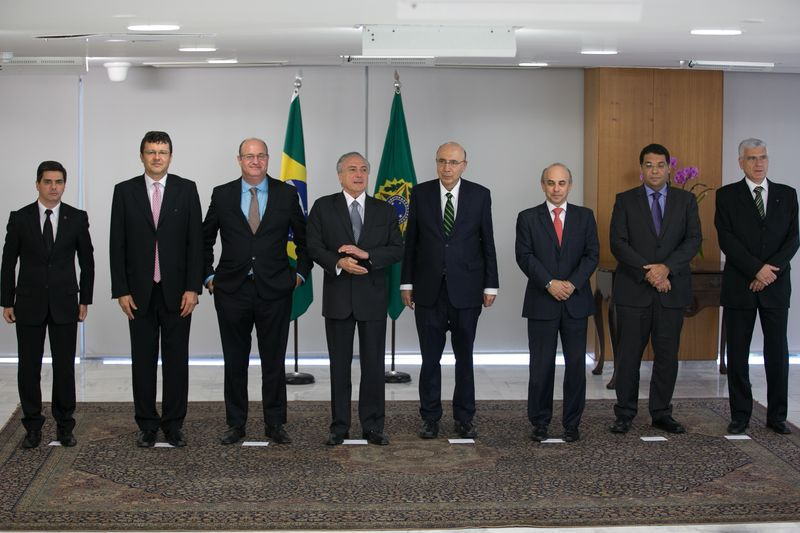
Temer meets with his economic team

The economic team announced cuts in commissioned positions as soon as it was sworn in. Romero Jucá, Minister of Planning, said that the government intended to cut up to 4,000 positions of trust and gratified functions, which would represent 18.4% of the total. Henrique Meirelles, the Minister of Finance, emphasized that balancing public accounts was essential to restore the country's confidence in the economy and to stimulate investments capable of promoting the country's growth and the creation of jobs.

According to Meirelles, the government's account deficit could exceed 96.6 billion reais in 2016. He did not rule out a tax increase, but assured that this should be a temporary measure. In his opinion, a minimum retirement age is fundamental to guaranteeing the financing of Social Security. The minister also said that the government could review subsidies (incentives given to different sectors), but without hurting acquired rights, and that the states' debt to the Union would need to be settled.

Although he didn't want his government to be represented by a parliamentarian close to Eduardo Cunha, Temer eventually gave in to pressure from known as the Centrão – a bloc of 225 MPs from different parties, whose support was needed to pass important amendments, such as the pension reform. On 18 May, he appointed André Moura, a PSC deputy from Sergipe, who was involved in six inquiries at the Supreme Court – with charges ranging from embezzlement to murder – and in the Car Wash investigations, for active and passive corruption and gang formation, to the leadership of the government in the Chamber.

On the same day, the administration received criticism from the Inter-American Commission on Human Rights. The organization expressed concern about the absence of blacks and women – who represent more than half of the Brazilian population – among the ministers appointed. The statement pointed out that the lack of women had not happened since the time of the military dictatorship and considered the elimination of the Ministry of Women, Racial Equality and Human Rights to be "alarming". It also cited the announcement of cuts to social programmes, pointing out that Brazil has signed the Protocol of San Salvador, which prohibits measures that reduce human, social and cultural rights. Temer, however, denied cuts to social programmes.

Criticism also came from opposition leaders in Brazil. The leader of the REDE party, deputy Alessandro Molon (RJ), said that the first measures announced would cut social rights, considering that they represented many setbacks and reversals. Molon criticized cuts to social policies in the area of education, the extinction of the Ministry of Culture and the lack of women in the government's top echelon. Congressman Edmilson Rodrigues (PSOL-PA) criticized the cuts to the [[Minha Casa, Minha Vida|Minha Casa, Minha Vida]] programme, announced by the new Minister of Cities, Bruno Araújo. Minister of Foreign Affairs José Serra's decision to grant a diplomatic passport to Assembly of God pastor Samuel Pereira, who was also accused in the Car Wash operation, was condemned by parliamentarians, including PCdoB leader Daniel Almeida (BA).

In a ceremony held at the Planalto Palace on 24 August, Temer defended the planned labour reform and said that its objective was not to remove rights, but to maintain jobs, because nothing hurts human dignity more than unemployment. BY July, labour minister Ronaldo Nogueira had already said that the Executive was trying to transform the CLT into "simplified and clear" legislation, but, according to him, without taking away workers' "basic rights". The labour reform would favour collective bargaining on issues such as wages and the length of workers' working hours, indicating that the CLT could be made more flexible on these points. Ronaldo also said that the government's proposal would include the regulation of "specialized service" contracts, referring to the possible outsourcing of all services, including the company's core activities. Currently, only middle activities could be outsourced.

=== Presidential inauguration ===
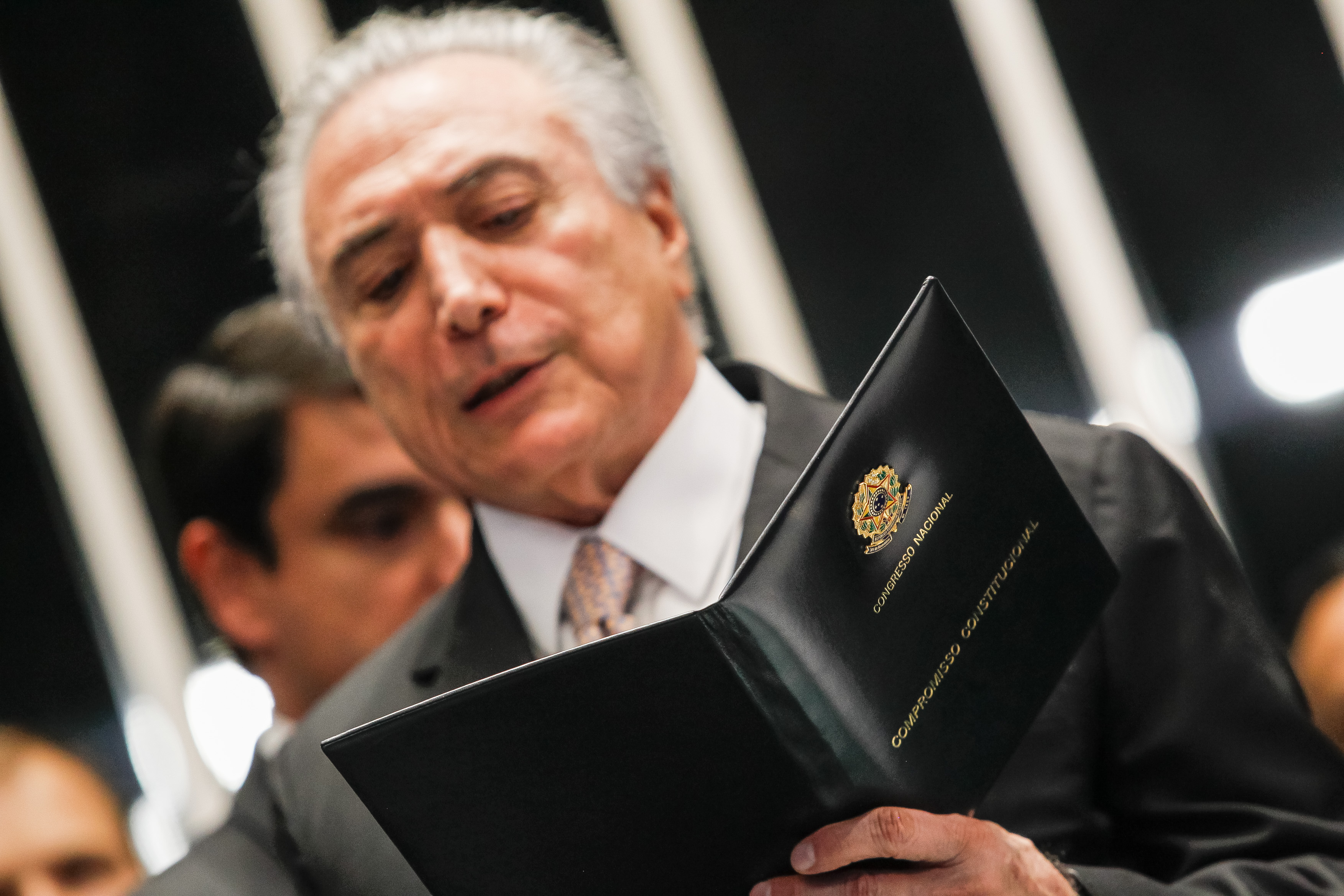
Temer reads the constitutional pledge upon assuming the presidency

On 31 August 2016, Temer was sworn in as president of Brazil at an inauguration ceremony in the National Congress, following Rousseff's conviction in the impeachment trial. Renan Calheiros, president of the National Congress, declared Temer inaugurated for a term lasting from 31 August 2016 to 1 January 2019. The ceremony lasted 12 minutes and there was no speech by the president. In his first official statement, he said: "We are now inaugurating a new phase in which we have a horizon of two years and four months. And it is hoped that, in these two years and four months, we will do what we have been boasting about, which is to put Brazil back on track".

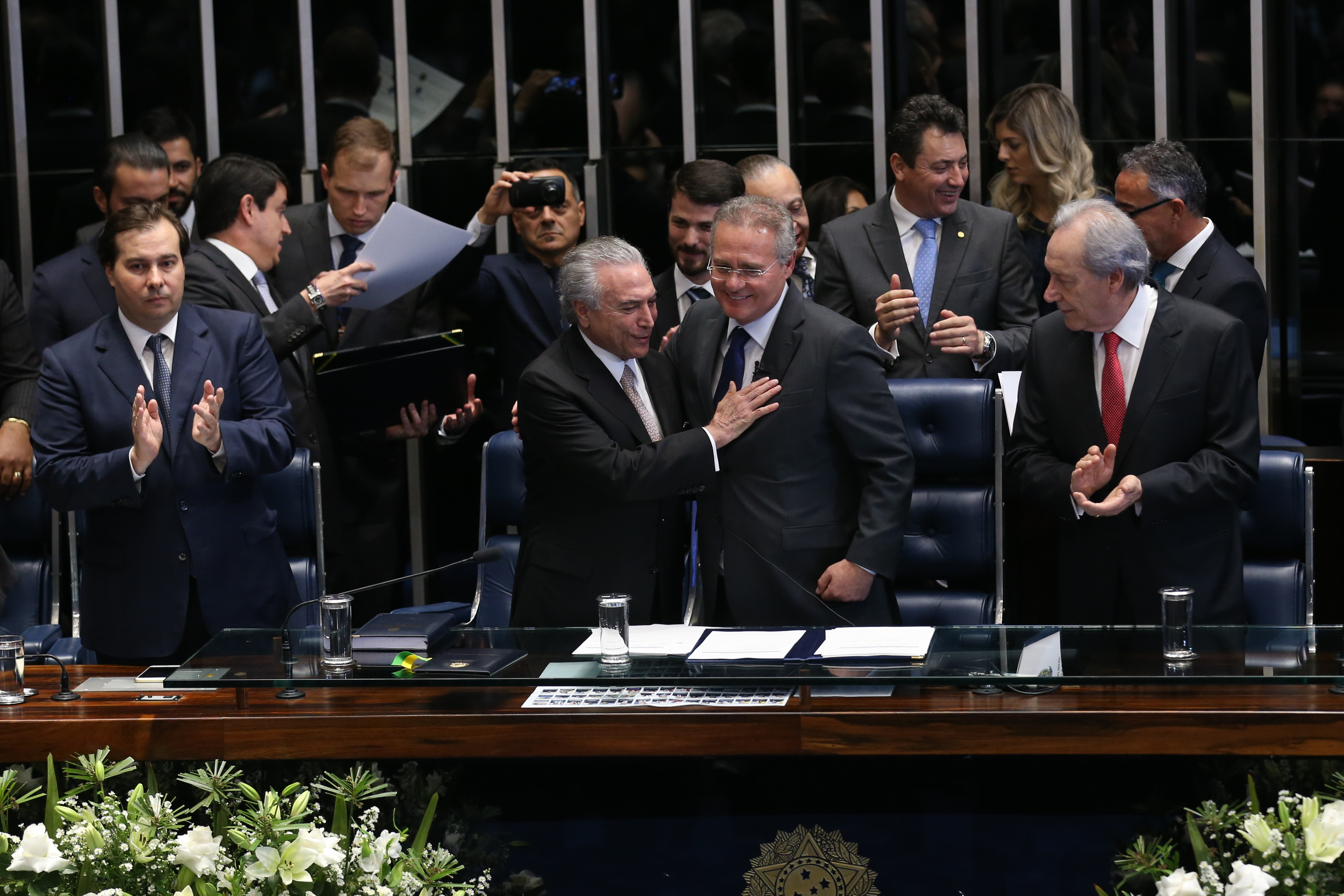
Temer receives greetings during his inauguration at the National Congress

After being sworn in as president on 31 August, Temer delivered a five minute speech. Above all, he defended the social security and labour reforms: "To guarantee the payment of pensions, we will have to reform social security. Without reform, in a few years the government won't be able to pay the pensioners" and "we have to modernize the labour legislation, to guarantee the current ones and generate new jobs," he said. He stated that the foundations of his government were social programmes, administrative efficiency, the resumption of economic growth, job creation, legal security and "the pacification of the country". Regarding the impeachment of Rousseff, Temer said that the process was democratic and that it was necessary to refute the accusation of a coup. He also stressed that he was cutting government spending.

== Ministerial Cabinet ==
From the start of the government of Temer until the last ministerial change, 29 ministers were changed. That's an average of about one ministerial change every 24 days. From 12 May 2016, one ministry has had four ministers, six ministries have had three ministers, twelve ministries have had two ministers, and six ministries have had only one minister in the entire period of the government.

== Internal policy ==
=== Public administration policy ===
==== State companies ====
The Senate approved a text that determined that 25% of the members of the board of directors must be independent, i.e. they must not have ties to the state-owned company or be related to people who hold senior positions in the executive branch. The member must have at least four years' experience in the area in which the state-owned company operates, have at least three years' experience in management positions and have an academic background compatible with the position. The independent members must not have been employees of the company – within a period of three years prior to their appointment to the board – or be suppliers or service providers of the state-owned company. The bill prohibits members of these boards from serving on the decision-making structures of political parties in the last three years prior to their appointment to the board. The rules also apply to those who will occupy vacancies on the boards of state-owned companies. A political candidate from the last elections must also serve a three-year term. Non-appointed civil servants with commissioned positions in the public administration will also not be able to sit on the board of directors of the state-owned company, unless they resign. Union members can sit on the board of directors, with the exception of union directors, who cannot be members of the board while they are in office. The law also prohibits the accumulation of positions of CEO of the state-owned company and chairman of the board of directors. The State-Owned Companies Accountability Law was approved on 30 June 2016.

==== Public servants ====
On 10 June, the government announced that it intended to cut 4,307 commissioned positions. The measure would save 230 million reais a year, although this was not much compared to the 250 billion reais a year spent on active and inactive civil servants. Most of these positions were in the DAS class (Senior Management and Advisory Group), which represented around 14% of the total number of 24,250 jobs of this type that currently exist. The aim was to "rationalize the current structure of the Executive Branch and orient it towards providing services to the population efficiently". In addition, a provisional measure was supposed to transform 10,462 freely-provided DAS positions, which can be occupied by people without a civil service exam, into commissioned functions in the executive branch, exercised by civil servants with civil service exams. This would reduce the number of people with no ties to the public service.

==== Privatization ====
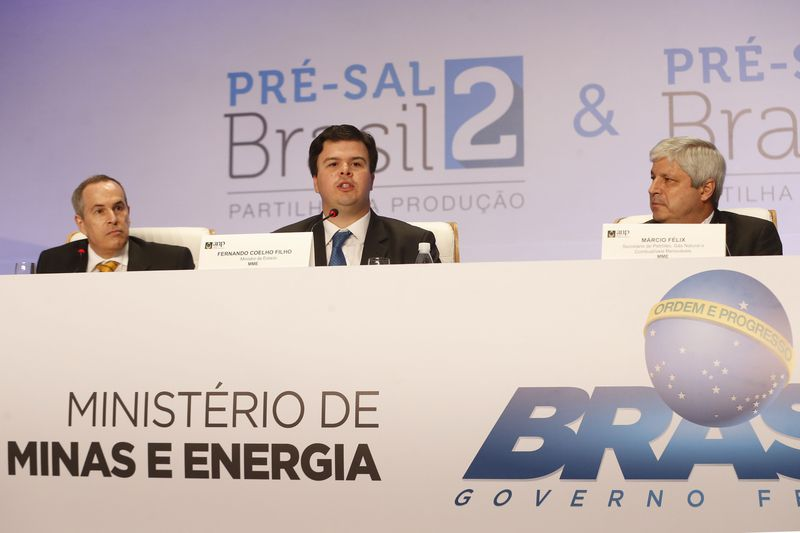
National Agency of Petroleum, Natural Gas and Biofuels (ANP) holds auction to share pre-salt blocks.

On 23 August 2017, the government announced the privatization of the Brazilian Mint as part of the Investment Partnership Programme (PPI), which included 57 state assets for concession or privatization. On the same day, and also as part of the PPI, a timetable was released that provided for measures aimed at auctioning off other public assets, such as airports, motorways and port terminals. There was an estimate of R$44 billion in investments over the life of the contracts. This revenue would improve the budget situation and meet the fiscal target for the year. The government had also announced the privatization of Eletrobras, through the sale of shares belonging to the Union, a proposal that was approved by the PPI board.

On 27 September, an auction of four hydroelectric plants operated by CEMIG generated twelve billion reais for the federal government. The four stations account for almost 40% of the entire generation capacity of the company, which tried to suspend the auction in court. Chinese investors bought the São Simão hydroelectric plant, the largest in the tender, while a French group got the Jaguara and Miranda plants, and Chilean representatives acquired the Volta Grande plant. In Belo Horizonte, there were protests by trade unions and social movements against the privatization. The auction took place on the São Paulo Stock Exchange.

On 27 October, the government held an auction of eight pre-salt exploration areas. Petrobras acquired three and agreed to cede up to 80% of production to the Union, a percentage well above the minimum values proposed in the public notice and the amount offered in the Libra auction in 2013. Six of the blocks offered had bids. The auction was regulated by a sharing system, which stipulates that whoever offers the largest share of surplus oil or gas from future production to the federal government will win the bid, considering the surplus to be the volume that remains after discounting exploration costs and investments. In addition, the companies have undertaken to pay the Union a bonus of 6.15 billion reais from the concessions sold.

=== Science and technology ===
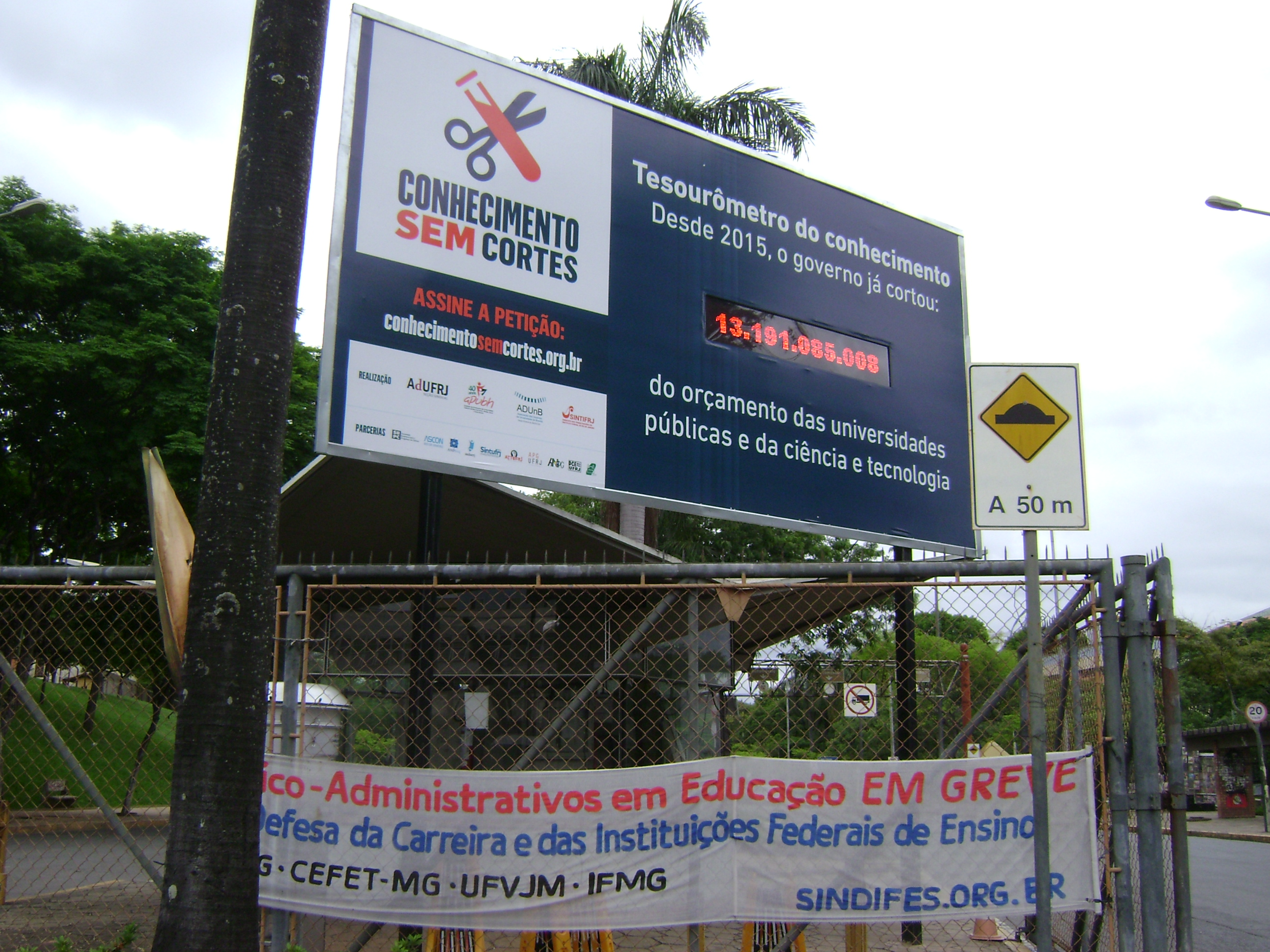
Panel set up in front of UFMG protesting against the government's cuts to science and technology funding

On 12 July, Temer announced investments in scientific and technological research. There were two models, one with private resources and the other with public resources. The first would be managed by the Brazilian Company for Industrial Research and Innovation, through bodies linked to universities. The second would be managed by the Brazilian Industrial Development Agency (ABDI), which would raise funds on the financial market and invest them in start-ups. The ministries of Science, Technology, Communication and Innovation, Industry and Foreign Trade, and Education would be in charge. However, the funds released in 2016 amounted to 500 million reais, just 9% of what was allocated to this area the previous year. In addition, there was excessive taxation and a lack of infrastructure.

In early October 2017, 23 Nobel Prize winners signed a letter addressed to Temer demanding a change in the policy adopted in the areas of science and technology. The text stated that the measures "seriously jeopardize Brazil's future" and that they needed to be revised "before it's too late", as well as mentioning that there could be "a 'brain drain', which will affect the best young scientists".

The document, headed by French physicist Claude Cohen-Tannoudji, reinforced the criticism of the 44% cut to the Ministry of Science, Technology, Innovation and Communications' budget in 2017, as well as a possible 15.5% cut expected for 2018. The government's projected budget for 2017 was R$3.2 billion (after the 44% cut at the beginning of the year). According to the newspaper O Globo, the amount was a third of what it had four years earlier. In 2018, the government's proposal would reduce to R$2.7 billion.

For Ildeu de Castro Moreira, president of the Brazilian Society for the Progress of Science, the manifestation of the international scientific community of the highest level demonstrated the importance that Brazilian science has gained in the international arena in recent years and how significant the current disincentive is. "Everyone is concerned about the dismantling of Brazilian science, which is very serious and jeopardizes the future of the country and its economic and social development". In addition, there was a demonstration on Paulista Avenue with around two hundred people against the spending cuts.

=== Economy ===
At the beginning of his term, Temer announced the direction of his government's economic policy, which was based on the guidelines set out in the document Uma Ponte Para O Futuro, drawn up by the Ulysses Guimarães Foundation. Temer's government began its term with a major public accounts crisis, inherited from the previous government. Although April 2016 recorded a primary surplus, the month of May saw a deficit – expenditure exceeding income, not including interest – of 15.49 billion reais. This was the worst result for the month of May since the beginning of the historical series in 1997. In addition to lower revenues due to the recession, public spending in May 2016 rose 7.3% over the same month a year earlier. Total expenditure reached 480 billion in the first five months of 2016, an increase of 11.3% compared to the same period in 2015, while total revenue amounted to 544.91 billion from January to May, an increase of 3.1% compared to the same period in the previous year. It was also the first deficit recorded for the first five months of a year since the historical series began in 1997. From January to May 2016, the accounts registered an unprecedented deficit of 23.77 billion reais. The government justified the imbalance with compulsory spending, including Social Security.

Public accounts have recorded consecutive fiscal deficits, worsening the public debt and increasing inflationary pressures. During Rousseff's presidency, Brazil lost its so-called "investment grade" rating – a recommendation to invest in the country – which was withdrawn by the three major rating agencies (Standard & Poor's, Fitch and Moody's). To contain the problem, the government managed to change the fiscal target and set a cap for public spending in Congress. Another measure was to propose a change in the social security rules, whose accounts in the first five months of 2016 totaled a deficit of 49.73 billion reais, an 81% increase in the deficit compared to the previous year; an even greater increase of 146 billion reais is forecast for 2017. By 2016, there had already been three consecutive years of government deficits.

On 2 July, the Federal Economics Council (Cofecon) issued a statement criticizing the conduct of the federal government. According to the board, the main reason for the growth in the primary deficit was not the increase in spending, but the sharp contraction in revenue, as a result of the economic downturn and the rise in tax avoidance and evasion. The text suggested that the growth in spending should be linked to GDP, something that was already happening in part under Rousseff's government, with the policy of linking the increase in the minimum wage to the country's growth. The text also criticized the current tax system. Brazil collected 72% of taxes on consumption and workers' income, compared to just 28% on income from capital and wealth. On average for OECD countries, an organization of developed and developing nations, the figures were 33 and 67%, respectively.

Cofecon also considered that there was no longer any need to maintain the basic interest rate at the current level of 14.25% per year to combat inflation. The government of Rousseff kept inflation above the target (4.5% per year) and close to the target cap (6.5% per year) throughout her first term, by interfering with administered prices such as fuel and bus fares. However, with the official inflation index registering 9% per year in May and other indices pointing to an upward trend in wholesale prices, the note said that "the tendency is already clear, that the factors that led to the rise in the inflation rate in the first half of 2015 are no longer present (strong correction of administered prices and exchange rate pass-through), that the recessionary situation eliminates any demand pressure and that the basic interest rate should therefore have been falling since the second half of 2015". The note concluded by warning of the risk of the appreciation of the national currency against the dollar, observed in the last month. "The rapid appreciation observed in recent weeks is functional for the fall in inflation, but it should once again put domestic industry in check, making it difficult to reverse high unemployment," said the eighteen members of the organization.

In his first week as Finance Minister, Henrique Meirelles declared that the country's economic situation was worse than in 2003, when he took over the Central Bank. However, his expectations were positive because the government had a reform schedule and the capacity to negotiate with Congress. Its objectives were: to pull the country out of recession; to create the conditions for sustainable development; to increase the country's confidence in order to stimulate investment, hiring, sales and the granting of credit, so that the economy would grow again in the short term; to stabilize public debt as a percentage of gross domestic product and then induce its gradual decline; to create a pro-growth agenda, improving the business environment, the Brazil cost, productivity and investments in infrastructure. Meirelles added that the first measure was to estimate the size of the public deficit in 2016 and then enter into negotiations with Congress. In addition, he talked about reducing the civil service by cutting ministries and commissioned positions.

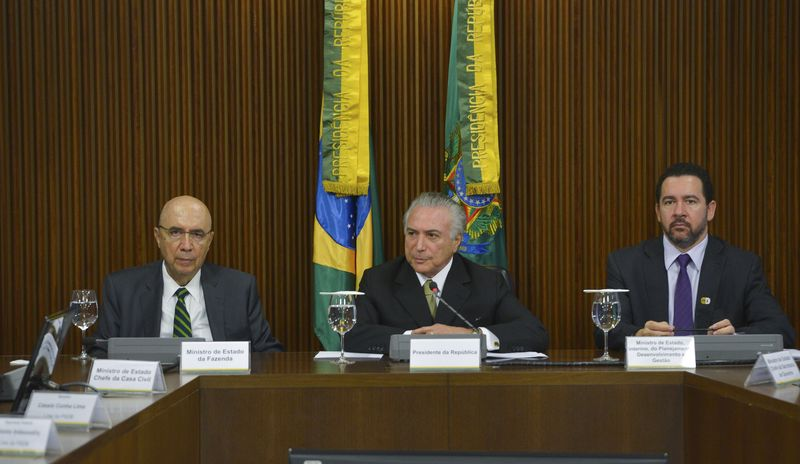
Temer announces economic measures alongside Henrique Meirelles

On 24 May, Temer announced the measures to control the public debt. He declared that he was governing together with Congress and that the approval of the new fiscal target was extremely important, also emphasizing the need to maintain the tranquility of institutions. He also said that he would have to establish strict criteria for appointing the heads of pension funds and state-owned companies and that, depending on a legal assessment, there would be the possibility of the National Development Bank (BNDES) returning 100 billion reais it had received from the National Treasury. The government injected 500 billion reais into the state-owned bank between 2009 and 2014, and these funds were lent to companies, charging lower interest rates than those practiced on the market.

This means a state subsidy for large companies, dubbed the "entrepreneur grant". The early recovery of these resources could reduce the public debt, which stood at 67% of GDP. Another way to reduce the debt would be to collect the resources of the so-called Sovereign Fund, estimated at 2 billion reais, which were conceived as a destination for pre-salt revenues, with the aim of relieving public accounts in times of crisis. In addition to these measures, Temer intended to impose a limit on government spending, which jumped from 14% to 19% of GDP between 1997 and 2015, affecting even health and education. He also hoped to save two billion reais a year by prohibiting an increase in the value of government subsidies already granted, such as tax incentives. On 25 May, Congress approved the reduction of the fiscal target, authorizing the government to close the year with a deficit of 170.5 billion in public accounts.

On 15 June, Temer presented Congress with a proposal for a constitutional amendment that would limit the increase in public spending to the variation in inflation, using the previous year's inflation as the basis for readjustment. This public spending cap would be valid for twenty years from 2017, and could be revised from the tenth year of its validity. According to the government, "the PEC will, for the first time, limit the growth of public spending and contribute to the necessary structural adjustment of public accounts". In the first year, the limit on total spending would be equivalent to the expenditure paid in the previous year, adjusted for inflation in that year. The proposal included health and education in the spending limit, but excluded various expenses, such as constitutional transfers to other federal units, and extraordinary credits. It also covered expenses by the legislature and the judiciary.

On 6 October, Temer announced that he would make available a credit line of 30 billion reais for Micro and Small Enterprises (MSEs), which could be used for loans and financing for working capital, investments and equipment purchases. Of the amount announced, twenty billion would be made available by Caixa Econômica Federal and Bank of Brazil; the rest would come from private banks (Bradesco, Itaú and Santander). In addition to increasing credit for the quarter, the measures announced would make it possible to improve the business environment in two other areas: training and reducing bureaucracy. The [[Minha Casa, Minha Vida|Instituição Amiga do Empreendedor]] programme was also be launched in partnership with the Ministry of Education and public and private universities, which would promote guidance in the area of business management and technical assistance to potential entrepreneurs. Another project presented was Simples Exportação, aimed to reduce bureaucracy in international trade for MSEs and establish the figure of the Logistics Operator, who would be responsible for operational export procedures.

On 22 November, the federal government, in a meeting with state governments, announced a national pact to balance public accounts. According to Henrique Meirelles, the Union agreed to give the states a larger share of the funds collected from the so-called repatriation, a programme that provided incentives for Brazilians to regularize assets held abroad that had not been declared to the Internal Revenue Service. In return, the governors would commit to making a strong adjustment to their accounts, similar to the one proposed by the Temer government itself, including an increase in the social security contribution paid by civil servants. The government collected 46.8 billion reais from income tax (IR) and fines from taxpayers who signed up to repatriation, but the states would only keep four billion of that total. The governors, however, also demanded a share of the fines. After a dispute in the Supreme Court, Temer gave in and the states would receive another five billion of the amount collected.

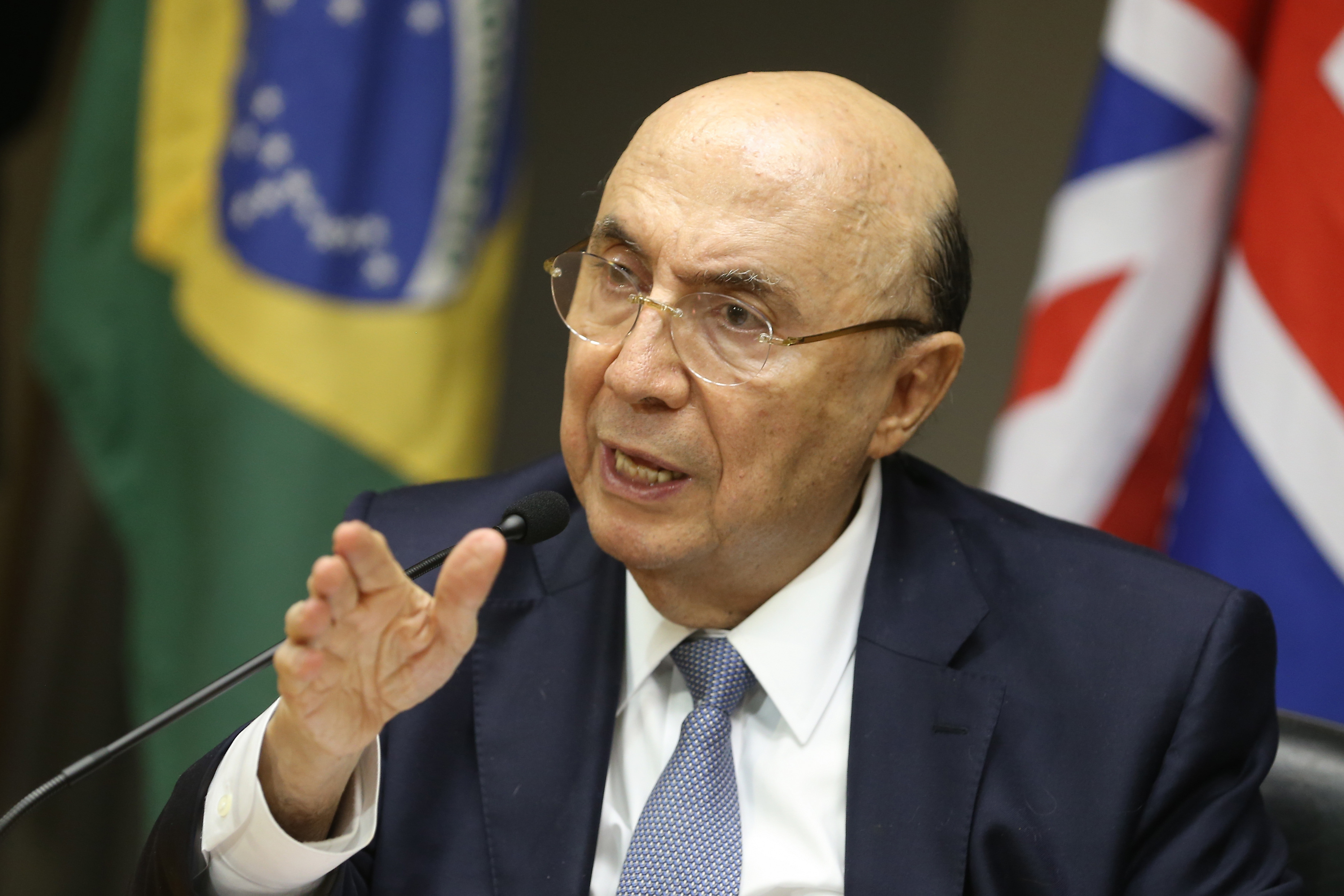
Finance minister Henrique Meirelles during a meeting with UK Chancellor of the Exchequer Philip Hammond at the Ministry of Finance

On 13 December, the government announced measures to improve the country's economic situation; one of them concerned the FGTS. When there were profits, part of them would continue to be deposited and the other half would be made available for the worker to pay off debts or make other use of. The government also wanted to reduce the 10% fine that employers had to pay when they fired workers. Another measure was the installment payment of tax debts owed to the government by companies and individuals, with the possibility of offsetting debts against certain credits.

It was also announced that there would be a major reduction in bureaucracy in economic activity, with "extraordinary simplification for companies to make labour and tax payments". There would also be a new policy for loans sought by companies from the National Bank for Economic and Social Development (BNDES), with lower interest rates. Michel Temer emphasized a measure that he called "differentiation" of prices for different means of payment (credit card, cash or check). In this way, merchants would be able to grant discounts, for example, for cash payments, something that already happened today, even though it was forbidden. The measures also aim to speed up foreign trade purchases and sales. According to Minister Meirelles, a single portal would be created, accessible via the Internet, to send all the documents and data required for commercial transactions with other countries.

In May 2017, after eight consecutive quarters of contraction, the country's economy began to show signs of recovery. The Central Bank's Economic Activity Index (IBC-Br) closed the first quarter of 2017 with an increase of 1.12% over the previous three months. Compared to the first quarter of 2016, activity was up 0.29%. Minister Henrique Meirelles said that the figures indicated a gradual recovery during 2017. In his words, "we are at a moment when the data has shown that there is the beginning of the recovery of the Brazilian economy in the first quarter which, in my opinion, is the answer to the set of actions and policies, of reform proposals that the government has taken since the beginning of Temer's mandate".

In August, the economic expansion was confirmed. The Central Bank reported growth of 0.25% compared to the first quarter. This second consecutive quarterly increase, with a peak of 0.5% in June, convinced economists that the country was really recovering. With the new figures, Projeções Broadcast collected 28 estimates from financial market institutions for the GDP result in the second quarter of the year. The average forecast was for stability, with the expectation that it would be in the range between a fall of 0.5% and a rise of 0.30%. Despite the modest results, taking into account the strong recession of 2015 and 206, Minister Meirelles said: "The services data, combined with the retail data, job creation in the Brazilian economy and, finally, with the IBC-Br, show that Brazil is growing again".

==== Agriculture ====
The government of Temer decided to continue the work of former minister Kátia Abreu by implementing the 2016/2017 Safra Plan. The aim was to reallocate resources to technology and logistics programmes, among others, as well as recompose the budget for rural insurance and marketing. Bank of Brazil opened a credit of 101 billion reais for the 2016/2017 harvest, which was divided into 91 billion for producers and cooperatives and ten billion for companies in the agribusiness chain. It was part of the federal government's 2016/2017 Agriculture and Livestock Plan, which would allocate 185 billion reais in credit for Brazilian rural producers to invest in funding and marketing, between 1 July 2016 and 30 June 2017.

==== Commerce ====
On 12 July, Temer became head of the Chamber of Foreign Trade (Camex), according to a decree published in an extra edition of the Federal Official Gazette, which also increased the participation of the Ministry of Foreign Affairs in the collegiate body. Camex had already been linked to Temer since May, when he merged and extinguished ministries and bodies. The decree has just regulated the changes to the collegiate body, which handles Brazil's foreign trade policy. As a result, Camex' Executive Management Committee (Gecex) is now chaired by the Minister of Foreign Affairs, José Serra. The Minister of Industry, Services and Foreign Trade, Marcos Pereira, took over the presidency of the Private Sector Consultative Council (Conex), the body that mediates between companies and the government within the scope of Camex. In addition to foreign trade, Camex will also take care of investment promotion.

==== Finance and budget ====
On 7 June, the Chamber of Deputies approved a constitutional amendment considered essential by Temer, which allowed the federal government to freely use part of its tax revenues, the so-called Devolution of Federal Revenues (DRU). This increased the percentage that could be transferred from the revenue from all federal taxes and social contributions from 20% to 30%. The rest of the revenue would be tied to expenses defined in the budget. The measure could be applied retroactively from 1 January 2016. This would benefit the government insofar as most of the current revenues had destinations specified in the legislation. The amendment did not alter minimum spending on health and education, as well as constitutional tax transfers to states and municipalities.

Another victory for the government was the Senate's approval of a supplementary bill that avoids making up the public accounts. According to the text, the revenue forecast in the Budget Guidelines Law (LDO) must be maintained in the Annual Budget Law (LOA) and in the budget authorization for the following year sent by Congress to the president. With the new premise, the revenue forecast will have to be realistic, avoiding, for example, building works whose costing is postponed until years later. The bill also stipulates that the Executive must send the Multiannual Plan (PPA) together with the LDO to the Legislature by April 30 in the first year of government, with the aim of preventing the LDO from being drawn up before the definition of investments in projects and programmes, which could also lead to a distortion between income and expenditure.

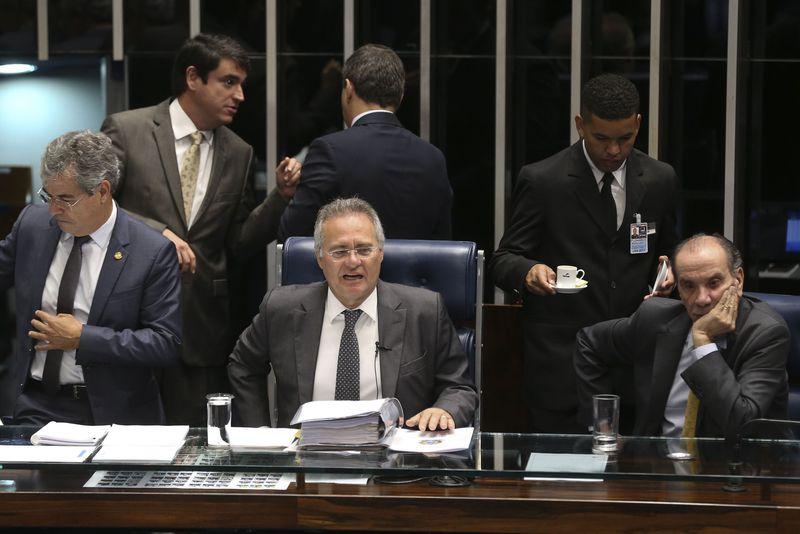
Senate approves PEC that limits public spending.

On December 13, the Senate, by 53 votes to 16, approved the basic text of the Proposed Amendment to the Constitution (PEC) that established a cap for public spending for the next twenty years. The proposal was sent by the president to Congress in June and was considered by the government to be essential for rebalancing public accounts, alongside the pension reform, while the opposition argued that the measure would freeze investment in health and education. The PEC's main goals are: federal spending will only be able to grow in line with inflation in the previous year; inflation for 2017, which would serve as the basis for spending, would be 7.2%; in the remaining years of the measure, the cap would correspond to the previous year's limit, adjusted for inflation measured by the Broad National Consumer Price Index (IPCA); if a branch disrespects the limit, it will suffer sanctions in the following year, such as a ban on holding public tenders or granting increases; if a branch exceeds the cap, another one must compensate.

Spending on health and education would only be included in the spending cap as of 2018; minimum spending on health would rise in 2017 from the current 13.7% to 15% of net current revenue and, as of 2018, these investments would be included in the spending cap and would be adjusted for inflation; Constitutional transfers to federal units, extraordinary credits, Fundeb supplements, Electoral Justice spending on elections and capitalization expenses of non-dependent state-owned companies were excluded from the new rules; from the tenth year of the spending limit, the president could send a bill to Congress to change the calculation basis. On December 15, the PEC was enacted into law.

==== Taxation ====
On 6 July, after a meeting with Temer and the economic team, the senator and rapporteur of the budget guidelines law, Wellington Fagundes, said that the revenue forecast would be raised by increasing CIDE taxes (on fuel) and with resources from concessions and privatizations. Other taxes, which do not depend on Congress, could also be raised. According to sources, raising the CIDE from 0.10 reais to 0.60 reais, for example, could result in an annual cash boost of up to 15 billion reais. With the increase, the deficit in the public accounts would reach 150 billion reais, but without it, it could reach 194 billion in 2017. Temer wanted to find other ways to reduce the gap, such as controlling spending and reviewing sick pay. In addition, the government had already collected eight billion in repatriated funds.

On 22 July, Temer made official the rate of 6% for Withholding Income Tax (IRRF) on remittances abroad for tourism expenses. Law 13,315 has a general rule of 6% for amounts remitted by individuals and companies up to a limit of 20,000 reais per month. Above this limit, the rate is 25%. In the case of travel agencies, there is no limit to the application of the 6% rate, with the exception of tax havens. For these, the rate is 25%. However, if the remittance is made by a travel agency, the rate will be 6%, with a limit of ten thousand reais per passenger per month. Tourist agencies must also demonstrate the effective operational existence of the beneficiary of the remittance located in a tax haven. The new legislation was negotiated for two years with tourism organizations, which celebrated the new rate, even though they wanted the tax exemption. Remittances for educational purposes and health treatment remain exempt from any taxation.

On 27 October, Temer signed sanctioned the bill that extends the deadline for tax debts for micro and small companies to be paid in installments, establishing new limits for companies to be included in SIMPLES, and the salon-partner law, which legalizes the hiring of legal entities to provide services in beauty salons – such as hairdressers, barbers, make-up artists, beauticians and waxers. Created in 2006, SIMPLES aims to reduce bureaucracy and make it easier for micro and small entrepreneurs to pay taxes. With the changes, the limit for micro-enterprises to be included in the programme has gone from the current 360,000 reais per year to 900,000 reais. The cap for small businesses has been raised from 3.6 million reais a year to 4.8 million reais. The new version of the law extends the deadline for paying tax debts from 60 to 120 installments. The new law also creates the figure of the "angel investor", to help startups (companies at the beginning of innovative activities) obtain contributions to put their products on the market. In this way, it will be possible to invest without the need for the investor to become a partner in the new venture.

=== Education ===
Programmes to encourage education and professionalization, such as Pronatec, ProUni and the Fundo de Financiamento ao Estudante do Ensino Superior (FIES), have suspended the opening of new vacancies. The Minister of Education, Mendonça Filho, said that he intended to honour the positions already contracted, but could not accept new applications due to a lack of resources. One of the main targets of the new education policy was the FIES, in which the government financed the study of low-income students at private universities, lending money that, after graduation, was returned by the beneficiaries. Mendonça did not intend to keep paying the bank fee (1.3 billion reais a year) and also stressed that the ProUni would need to demand results from the students who receive public money. Education managers believed that the government could invest in major projects, but that its resources were poorly used.

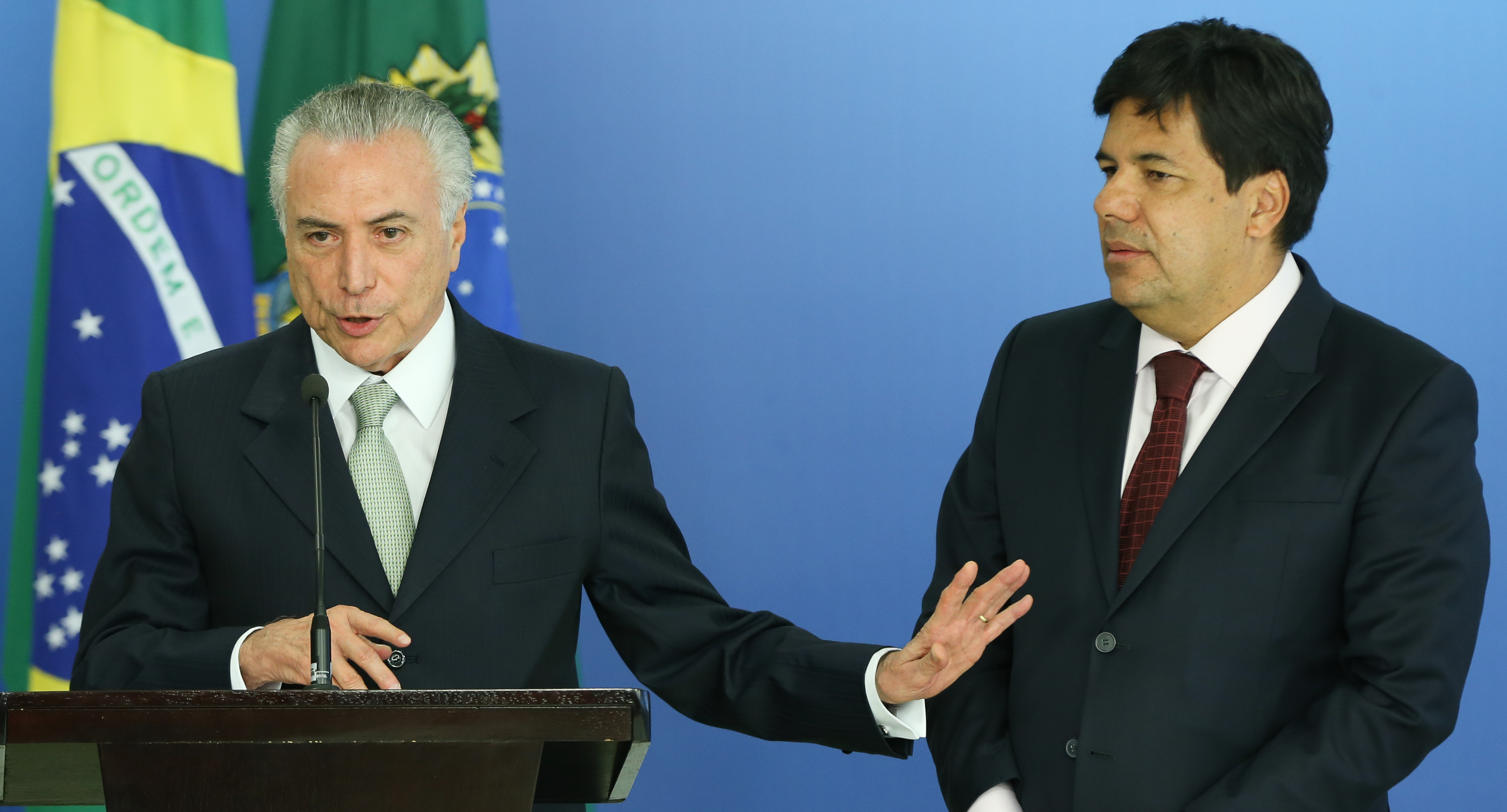
Interim president Temer and Education Minister Mendonça Filho announcing the extension of FIES.

On 16 June, Temer signed the authorization to create another 75,000 scholarships for the FIES. The investment by the Ministry of Education (MEC), earmarked for new contracts in the second semester of 2016, amounted to 450 million reais. This number of vacancies was made possible thanks to the replacement of 4.7 billion reais, compared to the 6.2 billion reais cut by the previous administration. The vacancies also represented an increase of more than 50% in the contracts signed in the first half of 2016. The new contracts changed the family income requirement from up to 2.5 minimum salaries to up to three minimum salaries, broadening students' access to university, and there would no longer be a deadline for declaring whether or not the student is enrolled in the course. In addition, there would be a time limit on the pre-selection of students on the waiting list and there would be a specific process for filling remaining vacancies.

On 16 February 2017, when Temer sanctioned the high school reform law, he declared in his speech at the Planalto Palace that the new model was only possible thanks to the government's boldness in facing up to the controversy surrounding issues that are relevant to the country. According to him, "we have sent proposals that generate healthy controversy. Controversy and criticism therefore generate improvement. Certainly, some of the changes made by Congress were made by society. So we ended up with a consensus. We are daring. Who would dare to put a cap on public spending? It would be very easy for the president to come in and spend as he pleases without worrying about fundamental reforms, in other words, the country's future. We're not doing that. Proposing the cap was a very successful dare. Now, the high school reform". Education minister Mendonça Filho, added that "high school was static, with thirteen compulsory subjects. [The student] has to assimilate that content in a similar and equal way for everyone, as if each one had the same profile as the other".

==== High School Reform ====
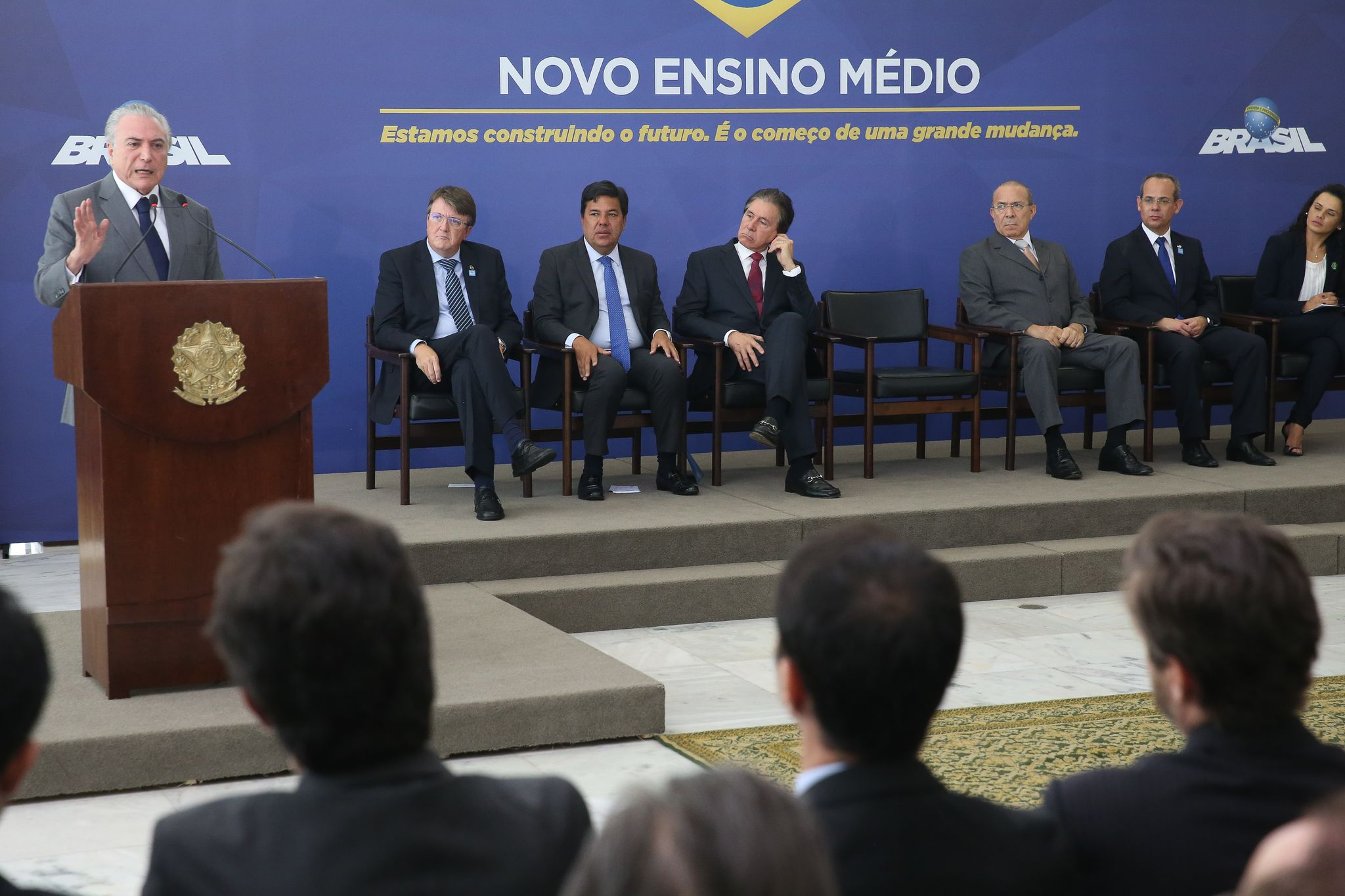
Temer sanctions the reform of high school education, in a ceremony at the Planalto Palace

On 22 September 2016, Temer presented the biggest education reform proposal in two decades. Based on models from South Korea and Australia, the project focused on training students in their areas of interest. The core of the change was the replacement of the thirteen subjects that currently made up the high school curriculum by the so-called formative itineraries, grouped into five large groups: languages, mathematics, natural sciences, human sciences and technical and professional training. Within each of these, there would be five subjects and each school or school network would decide which other subjects would be part of this itinerary; the only compulsory subjects would be Portuguese, English and mathematics. The student would choose what to study at the end of the first year of high school. As an example, a student who reached the end of the first year and opted for the language itinerary would have classes in Portuguese, English, mathematics (these three would make up the compulsory timetable), Brazilian literature, Brazilian history, general history, geopolitics and Spanish. The example is hypothetical, as each school or network would be free to choose the five subjects that would make up each itinerary. On entering university, students could use credits from subjects taken in high school whose content was similar to that offered in the degree. This depended on regulations from the faculties.

The provisional measure that established the new rules foresaw that the 2,400 hours of class time in total would be divided into 1,200 hours of class time dedicated to the subjects of the Common National Curriculum Base (BNCC) and another 1,200 hours of class time dedicated to the subjects that the student chose to study. The aim was to allow students to delve deeper into the areas in which they were most interested. However, the new model is risky, as it increases inequalities. With the freedom to choose what would be offered, schools in more vulnerable locations could fail to offer natural science subjects, for example – an area that systematically lacks chemistry and physics teachers. "The education departments will have the vital job of looking at the network in each region and ensuring a balance of offers. Every student should have all the alternatives in their neighborhood, if not in one school, then in the nearest one," said Ricardo Henriques, superintendent of the Unibanco Foundation. The new model of curriculum organization would be linked to the BNCC and could only be implemented once this national curriculum had already been implemented. The forecast given by the MEC is that this will happen in 2017. The choice of the flexible curriculum should only be made in 2018.

On 8 February 2017, the Senate approved the provisional measure, and on 16 February, it was sanctioned by the president. The parliamentarians removed the direct reference to the removal of physical education, art, sociology and philosophy as compulsory subjects, getting around the problem with an amendment that determined the existence of subjects qualified as "studies and practices" to be included as compulsory in the National Common Curriculum Base. Regarding the permission for teachers without a specific degree to teach, the final text stated that teachers with "notorious knowledge", as long as they are recognized by the education system and the courses are linked to their areas of expertise, can teach exclusively for technical and professional training courses. In addition, professores without a degree will have to complete a teaching course to become qualified to teach. However, experts questioned the reformulation of education by means of a provisional measure and considered that many schools would not be able to offer all subjects, restricting students' options. The Attorney General of Brazil, Rodrigo Janot, sent an opinion to the Supreme Federal Court (STF) in which he stated that the provisional measure that established a reform in high school education was unconstitutional. Former education ministers interviewed by G1 feared that the reform would widen inequalities in educational opportunities.

On 15 December, the National Common Curriculum Base (BNCC) for primary and preschool education was approved by the National Education Council (CNE). This document acts as a guideline for the country's entire education system and includes the following measures: religious education has guidelines on what should be taught from 1st to 9th grade; literacy should be completed by the second grade; guidelines on gender identity should be discussed by a CNE commission; municipal, state and federal networks need to rework their curricula according to the BNCC; teaching materials will have to be produced according to the new guidelines; implementation should be complete by the beginning of the 2020 school year. According to the council, "the BNCC is not a curriculum, it is a set of references on which the critical and creative process of schools will elaborate their curricular process". It was approved by twenty votes to three.

=== Infrastructure ===
On 26 July, Dyogo Oliveira, Minister of Planning, Budget and Management, said that the government would prepare a list of infrastructure projects under the Growth Acceleration Programme (PAC) that it considered a priority for public investment. The government intended to concentrate transfers on projects linked to the programme that were unfinished and had an estimated cost of up to 10 million reais. Currently, there were around 2,000 projects in this situation. The measure, he said, was necessary because the government, with its accounts in the red, didn't have the resources to carry out all the PAC projects and needed to cut spending. These unfinished projects amounted to two billion euros, which still needed to be invested. However, not all of them were paralyzed due to budget issues – there were projects that were unfinished due to lack of licences or that had had bids embargoed – and all those that didn't have technical problems would be resumed. On 10 November 2017, the Avançar programme was created, with the aim of increasing public investment and resuming works that had been paralyzed.

On 13 September 2016, the Temer government announced its first package of concessions and privatizations, which included 34 projects including airports, motorways, port terminals and railroads, as well as assets in the electricity, oil and gas, minerals and sanitation sectors. The aim of the federal government's concessions was to stimulate growth in the Brazilian economy, which was currently going through the biggest recession in its history. In 2015, gross domestic product (GDP) shrank by 3.8% – the most in 25 years – and in 2016 it was expected to fall by more than 3%, according to bank analysts. At the same time, the amounts collected from concessions and permits would help to close the books in 2017. The National Bank for Economic and Social Development (BNDES) and the Investment Fund of the Length-of-Service Guarantee Fund (FI-FGTS) would contribute 30 billion to help finance the Investment Partnership Programme (PPI). Other sources would be the Bank of Brazil, private banks and possibly new investors.

On 10 March 2017, Temer inaugurated the eastern axis of the São Francisco River transposition in the cities of Sertânia, Pernambuco, and Monteiro, Paraíba.

=== Housing policy ===
Temer and the Minister of Cities, Bruno Araújo, announced the Cheque Reforma, meant to benefit 15 million Brazilian families currently living in precarious housing. According to the minister, the target audience was families with an income of between zero and three minimum wages, who would benefit from up to five thousand reais (with funds from the National Treasury) for the purchase of building materials for housing improvements. The new programme would allow, among other reforms, the construction of bathrooms or sanitary pits, enlargement of the home, improvement of the roof, plastering and improvement of the floor. In the minister's words, "It will be a successful programme, very important for improving the lives of millions of Brazilians". The government also announced the resumption of construction work on 10,609 housing units under Minha Casa, Minha Vida aimed at the low-income population, covering 35,000 units; and that, in 2017, it would contract 600,000 new units under this social programme. According to minister Araújo, the contracting of units for families with a gross monthly income of up to R$2,350.00 and who have the capacity to compromise their income, was also being released. Under the new programme, families can count on subsidies of up to R$45,000, depending on their income and the location of the property, as well as reduced interest rates for financing, using almost exclusive resources from the FGTS.

On 6 February 2017, the government redefined the income brackets for its low-income housing programme. With the new policy, family income has been extended to between 1,800 and 9,000 reais. Another measure was to raise the cap on the value of properties that can be purchased under Minha Casa, Minha Vida: from 225,000 to 240,000 reais in the Federal District, São Paulo and Rio de Janeiro; and from 170,000 to 180,000 reais in the capitals of the North and Northeast. Extending the ranges would require an increase in the budget of R$8.5 billion for subsidies and financing. R$200 million would be paid by the Federal Government, destined for subsidies in categories 1.5 and 2; the FGTS would contribute R$1.2 billion for allowances; and another R$7.1 billion would be needed to finance all categories. The main objective of the provisions was to increase job creation and the goal was to contract 610,000 new housing units in all the MCMV modalities in 2017. The Minister of Planning, Dyogo Oliveira, denied that the government's recent permission for workers to withdraw amounts from inactive FGTS accounts would reduce the volume of resources from the fund earmarked for housing finance.

=== Justice and human rights policy ===
On 23 June, Temer signed a bill that regulated individual and collective injunctions. According to the text, once the injunction has been recognized, the courts must set a deadline for the creation of the required standard. It also specifies that, until such time as the law is created, the court's decision will apply only to the plaintiff and will define the conditions for exercising this right. In collective cases, the effects of any decision will only be extended to the individual plaintiff who withdraws from the case within thirty days of the case being decided. The law also opens up the possibility for the rapporteur of the action to decide, monocratically, after the case has become final and unappealable, if necessary, whether the decision will be binding. This decision can be reviewed if there is a change in fact or law. Temer said that the amendment guarantees that citizens can enjoy their rights by preventing the omission of a regulatory authority from violating rights indefinitely.

On International Women's Day, 8 March, Temer delivered a speech that caused negative repercussions. He said that women are important for the economy because "no one is more capable of pointing out price differences, for example, in supermarkets than women" and added "how much women do for the house, how much they do for the home, what they do for their children". Contrary to official data from research institutes, the president said that there is equality in employment between men and women and that women have a large share of senior positions in companies and in the legislature. The content of his statement caused fierce reactions on social media and from women in political positions. In his defence on Twitter, he declared that "My government will do everything to ensure that women occupy more and more space in society and (...) have equal rights at home and at work. We will not tolerate prejudice and violence against women".

=== Public security ===
Following an episode of gang rape in Rio de Janeiro, Temer announced that he would create a department in the Federal Police to deal with this type of crime. "I repudiate with the utmost vehemence the rape of the teenager in Rio de Janeiro. It is absurd that in the 21st century we have to live with barbaric crimes like this. Our government is mobilized, together with the Rio de Janeiro Public Security Secretariat, to ascertain responsibility and rigorously punish the perpetrators of the rape and the dissemination of the criminal act on social networks," said Temer in a public statement. The department would function like a women's police station and would aim to gather state information and coordinate actions across the country. In addition, Fátima Pelaes would be appointed to the Women's Secretariat, since the corresponding ministry has been abolished.

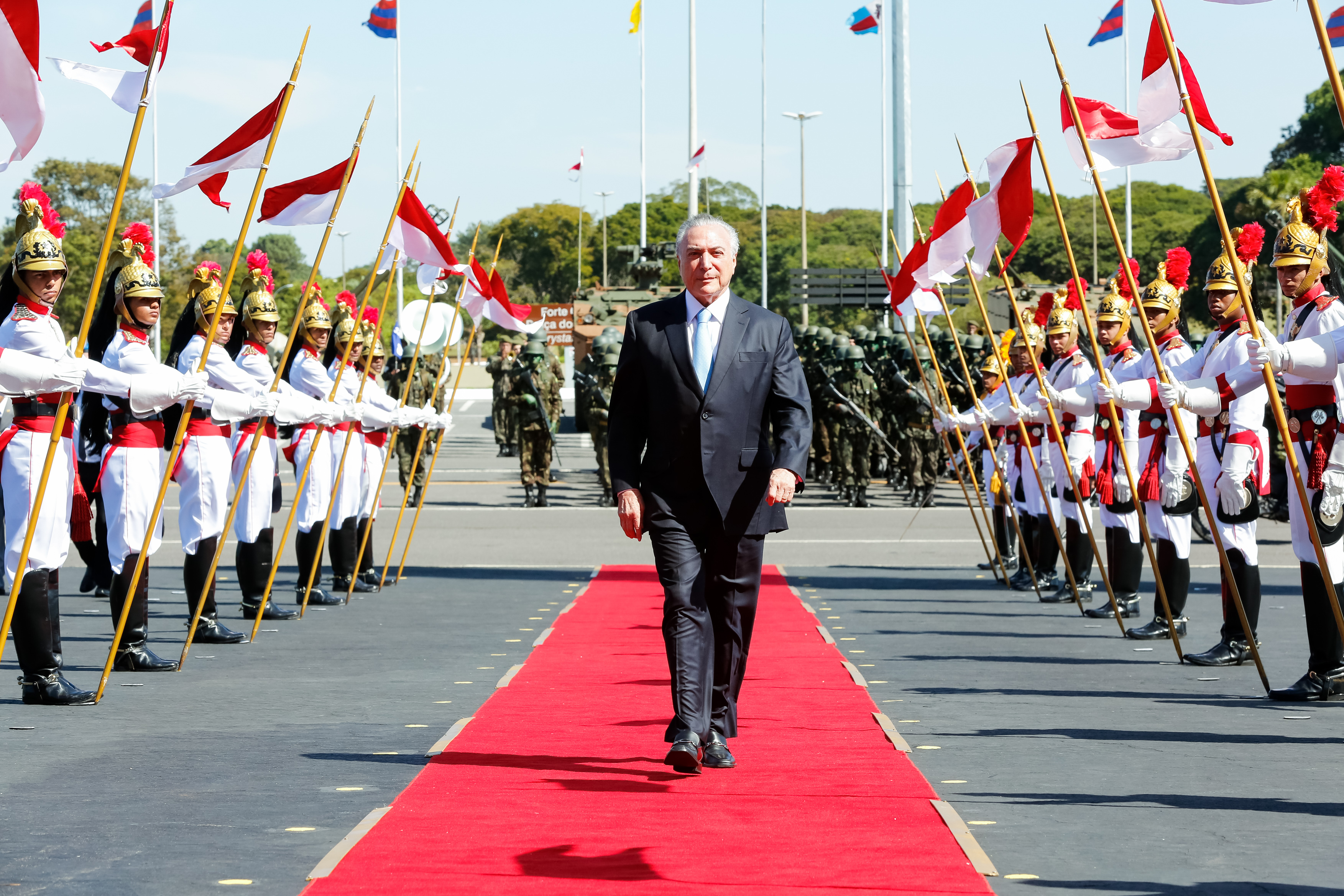
Temer on Army Day 2017

In January 2017, a crisis broke out in the Brazilian prison system following riots by prisoners belonging to rival factions in the country's northern region. On 1 January, 56 prisoners were killed after a rebellion at the Anísio Jobim Penitentiary Complex (Compaj) in Manaus, Amazonas. Members of two rival drug trafficking gangs, the Primeiro Comando da Capital (PCC) and the Família do Norte (FDN) – allied to the Comando Vermelho (CV) – clashed in what was considered the most violent massacre in the history of the Brazilian prison system since the Carandiru massacre, in 1992. Five days later, 33 prisoners were killed at the Monte Cristo Agricultural Penitentiary, located in the rural area of Boa Vista, in Roraima. According to the newspaper Folha de S.Paulo, the massacre in Roraima was the PCC's response to the rebellion led by the FDN in Amazonas.

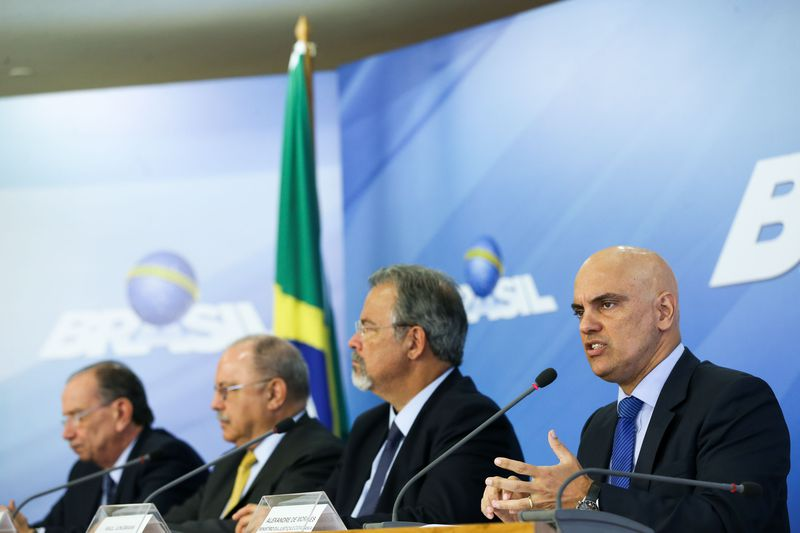
Government announces National Security Plan.

On 5 January, Temer commented for the first time on the prison riot. In a meeting with ministers, he initially expressed solidarity with the families of the prisoners killed in what he classified as an accident in Manaus. According to the president, although public security is the responsibility of state governments, the reality requires national intervention. He recalled that the Manaus prison is outsourced, so there was no direct responsibility on the part of state agents, but he stressed that they should have kept information about the event, like the Ministry of Justice, which did so from day one.

Temer announced the first measures of the National Security Plan, including the construction of five federal prisons for high-risk criminals. The government should release around R$40 million to R$45 million for each prison. In addition, of the R$1.2 billion from the penitentiary fund released the previous week, R$800 million would be earmarked for the construction of penitentiaries in each state. Each prison should have separate blocks: one for the most dangerous prisoners and another for the least dangerous. They would have to serve their sentences in separate places, which was not the case in all penitentiaries. He also released money for the purchase of equipment to block cell phone signals in prisons. According to Temer, the jammers should be installed in at least 30% of the jails in each state where they have been requested.

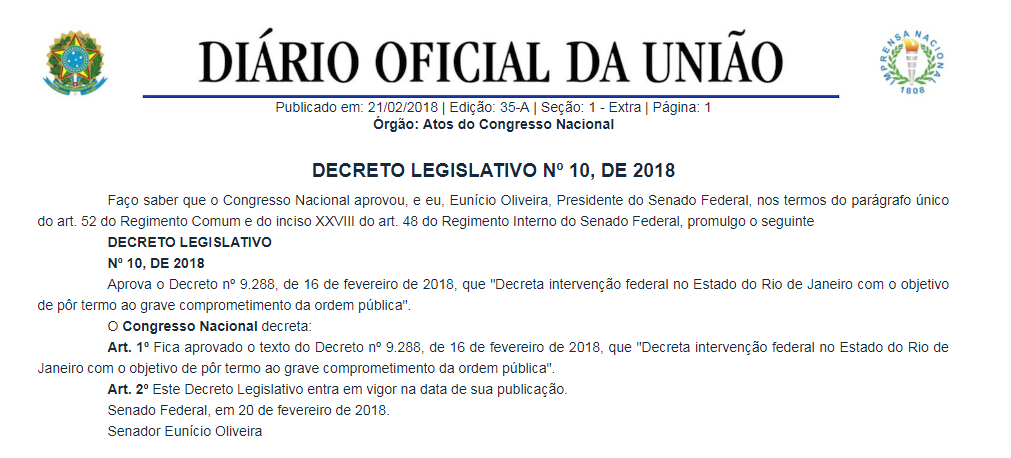
Legislative Decree in which the National Congress of Brazil approved the Federal Intervention in Rio de Janeiro in 2018

On 17 February 2018, alongside the governor of Rio de Janeiro, Luiz Fernando Pezão, and the city's mayor, Marcelo Crivella, Temer announced at a meeting the creation of the Extraordinary Ministry of Public Security, headed by until then defence minister Raul Jungmann. It was established by provisional measure and on a temporary basis, to coordinate public security actions throughout the country. The government declared that the ministry would have a "lean structure", with the creation of a few positions and the incorporation of bodies previously linked to the Ministry of Justice, such as the Federal Police. At the same time, Congress began to focus on new security measures, such as the bills to regulate the Integrated Public Security System, the draft legislation to toughen the fight against drug trafficking and changes to the Penal Enforcement Law.

On 11 June, faced with the current crime crisis in the country, Temer approved the law that created the Unified Public Security System (SUSP) and signed a provisional measure to direct part of the proceeds from the federal sports lotteries to spending on combating violence and crime, ensuring a contribution of 800 million reais to the budget for the year. The SUSP would aim to integrate intelligence information on crime and standardize the formatting of data, such as police records. State public security forces, both the civil and military police, would act jointly in operations with federal agencies. To maintain the system, the National Public Security Fund should receive an estimated 4.3 billion reais from lotteries, including some to be created, by 2022. The Provisional Measure also dealt with the creation of a graduate school in security knowledge and a national data institute.

=== Social security ===
==== Social assistance ====
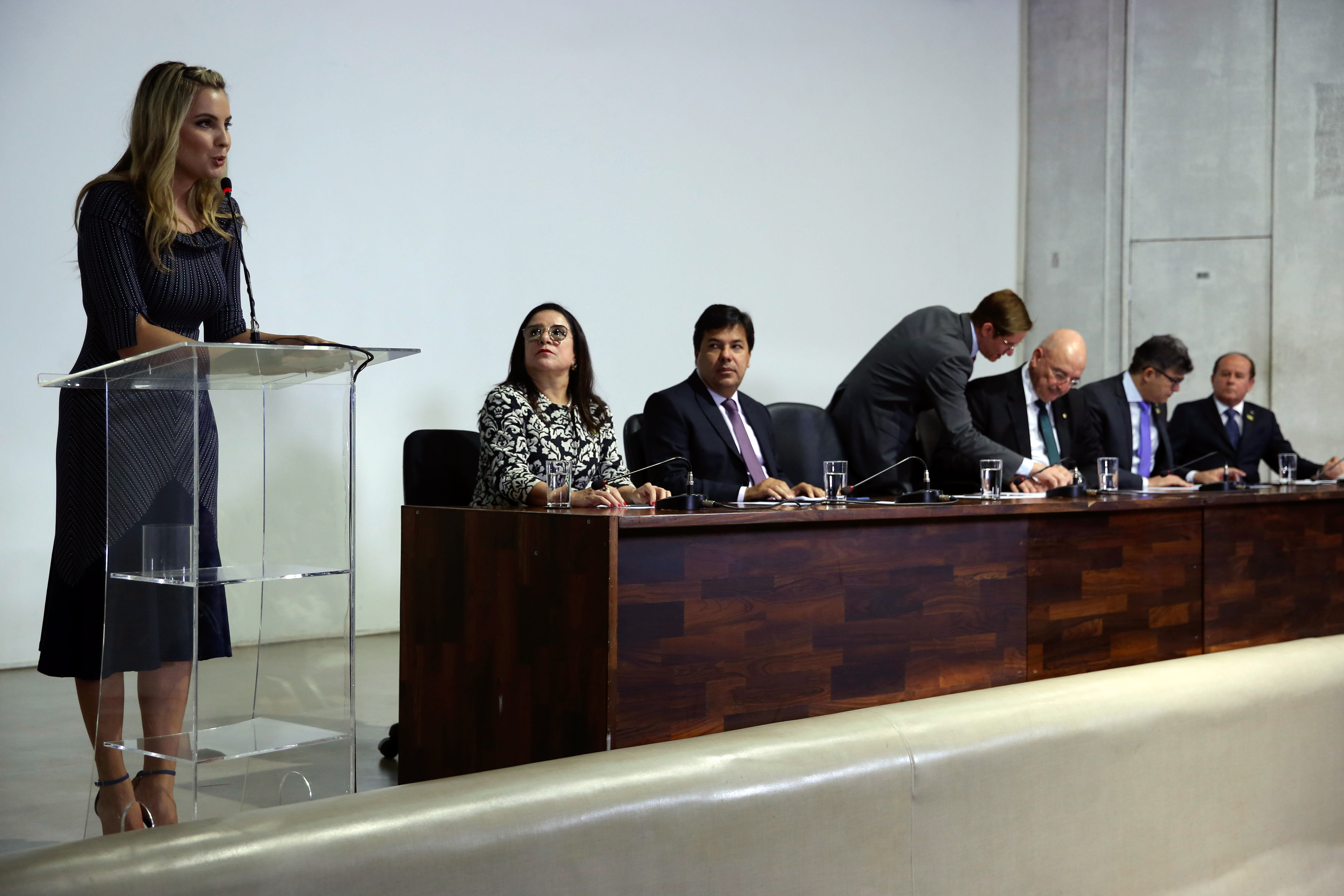
First lady Marcela Temer speaks during the signing of a cooperation agreement with universities on the Criança Feliz programme

Michel Temer declared that he intended to continue investing in existing social programmes, such as Bolsa Família. In addition, he launched the Criança Feliz programme aimed at provising in-person care for all children of Bolsa Família beneficiaries. The plan included the hiring of 80,000 people with complete high school education and a cost of R$2 billion a year, with the goal of providing assistance to children up to the age of three, covering a period considered vital for cognitive development. The professionals hired were called Criança Feliz, because they would enter the homes of people who received the Bolsa Família, with a target of six homes for each visitador in one working day. The total number of beneficiaries of the programme would reach 13.904 million families in four million homes. In poorer environments, it is very difficult to stimulate children in early childhood. The repercussions can be devastating for the rest of these individuals' lives, who sometimes end up having problems with literacy and social interaction.

On 31 October, Temer announced the launch of a social programme called Cartão Reforma, which consisted of a credit line of up to R$5,000 for families to renovate their homes or do small jobs. "If this is achieved, naturally imagine the following: the guy has his property there. He'll want to enlarge a room or cement the house or enlarge the bathroom, and for that we're launching the so-called Cartão Reforma," said the president. According to the Ministry of Cities, the funds for the programme came from the federal budget and the families who benefited would not have to return the money to the government. For 2017, the government planned to set aside R$300 million for Cartão Reforma. The government's aim was to improve the quality of housing in so-called consolidated occupations, i.e. those neighborhoods that were born out of an irregular occupation, but which have existed for many years. Beneficiary families would receive support from an architect and engineer, who would verify the specific needs of each home.

==== Social welfare ====
The then Minister of Finance, Henrique Meirelles, said that he intended to defend a minimum age for claiming the benefit, for both men and women, probably 65. He said that the current pension system was not sustainable and was at risk of not being able to pay benefits to people of retirement age. For him, the pension reform was urgent so that the government could honour its commitment in the future. The minister's statement came in the wake of a new study by the World Health Organization (WHO), which pointed out that life expectancy has increased by five years worldwide in the last fifteen years. In 2016, the average retirement age was 57, compared to 64 for Europeans. The INSS deficit was expected to reach R$116 billion in 2016.

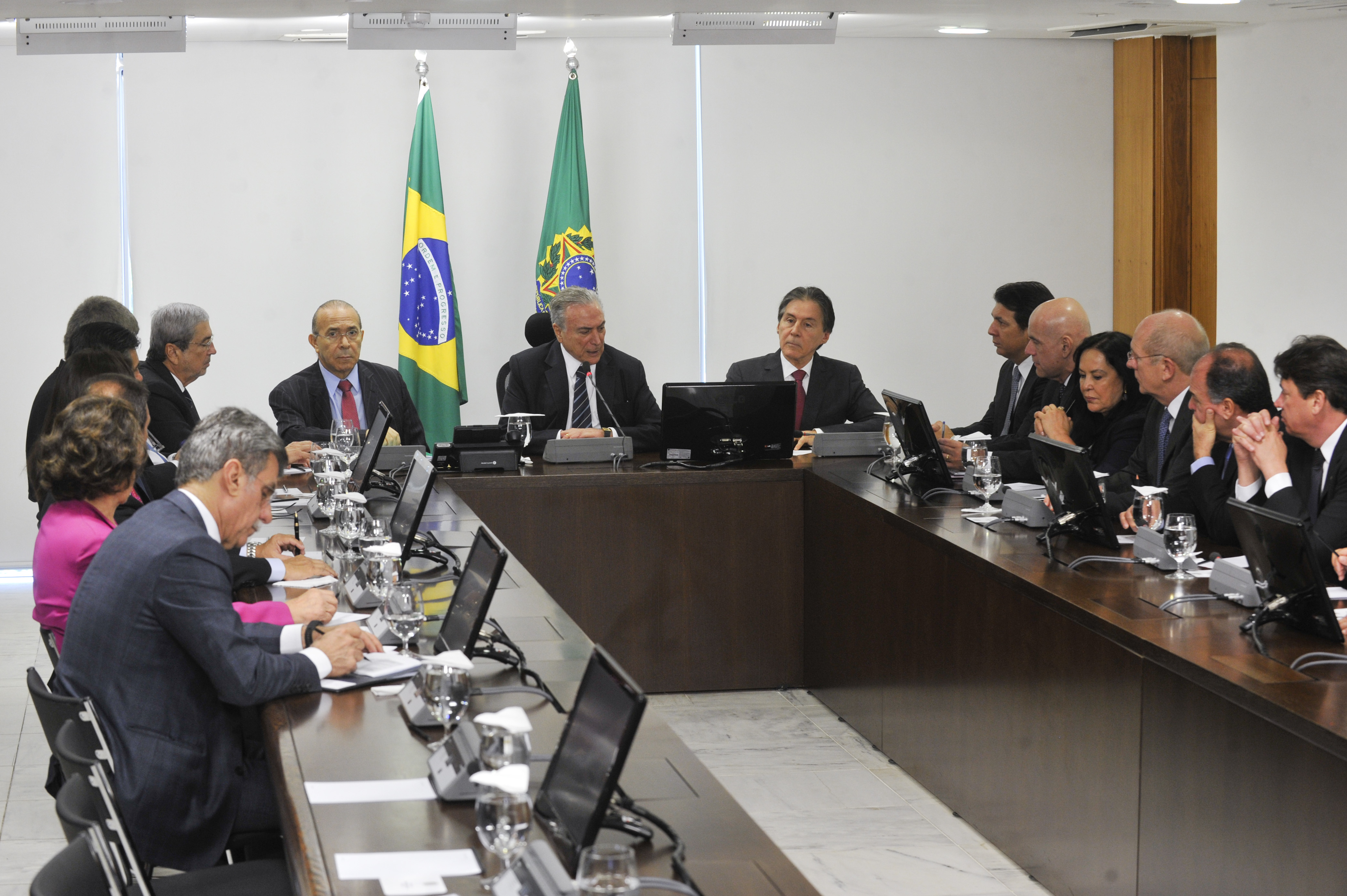
President of the Federal Senate, Eunício Oliveira, participates in a meeting with Temer and the economic team, to discuss the Social Security reform proposal.

On 5 December, Temer presented Congress with a proposed constitutional amendment for pension reform, whose most important point was retirement at 65 for men and women. The military would have a separate proposal and rural workers would still have to discuss their condition. States and municipalities could join Funpresp. The government's stated aim was to try to maintain the sustainability of public accounts, in the face of a growing deficit in the Brazilian pension system, due to an ageing Brazilian population and a fall in the country's birth rate. There would, however, be transitional rules for men over 50 and women over 45. "No more small reforms. Either we face up to it [the need to reform Social Security] or we will condemn pensioners to knocking on the doors of the public authorities and receiving nothing [in the future]," declared the president.

On 24 November 2017, the government presented an alternative proposal, which included a transition rule. The text sent to Congress incorporated: an additional 30% contribution time on top of the thirty years of contribution for women and thirty-five years for men; a retirement value dependent on contribution time, reaching 100% only with forty years of contribution; a stricter rule for civil servants, starting at 55 for women and 60 for men, with the guarantee of full benefit only with the minimum contribution time of forty years; and a progressive minimum age. This age would be 53 for women and 55 for men. It would gradually rise to 62 for women and 65 for men, with the transition ending in 2036 for women and 2038 for men. With the approval of the proposal, those who were close to retiring under the current rule could use the transition rule to retire earlier.

In February 2018, Michel Temer suspended the progress of his pension reform bill in Congress.

=== Labour policy ===
On 22 December, the government presented its labour reform proposal. One of the measures was the authorization to withdraw inactive accounts from the Length-of-Service Guarantee Fund (FGTS) to mobilize the economy. The National Employment Protection Programme was made permanent and renamed the Employment Insurance Programme. Working hours could be extended to up to twelve hours a day and temporary employment contracts would be extended from 90 to 120 days. There could be two contract models, one based on productivity and the other on hours worked. Credit cards would undergo changes, with lower interest rates and installments. Labour minister, Ronaldo Nogueira, stated that there was no intention of altering rights acquired in the Consolidation of Labour Laws (CLT), such as holidays, thirteenth salary, FGTS and transportation and meal vouchers, nor paid weekly rest. On the other hand, the Unified Workers' Central (CUT) emphasized that the new legislation established the sovereignty of negotiated over legislated, which means that employers and employees would be free to promote negotiations without regard to labour legislation.

Minister Eliseu Padilha, of the Civil House, explained the points of collective bargaining that could acquire the force of law: splitting holidays into up to three installments, with at least two consecutive working weeks between two of these installments; agreeing to a limit of 220 hours in the monthly working day; the right, if agreed, to a share in the company's profits and results; the formation of an hours bank, with the conversion of the hour that exceeds the normal working day being guaranteed with a minimum increase of 50%; time spent on the journey to and from the workplace; establishment of a break during the working day of at least 30 minutes; establishment of a job and salary plan; remote working; remuneration for productivity; provision for extending the effects of a rule even after its expiration date; entry into the unemployment insurance programme; recording of working hours. The government's proposal maintained the standard working day of 44 hours a week, plus four hours of overtime, with the possibility of up to 48 hours a week. However, the working day could be up to 12 hours (eight plus four extra hours) as long as the limit of 48 hours per week was respected.

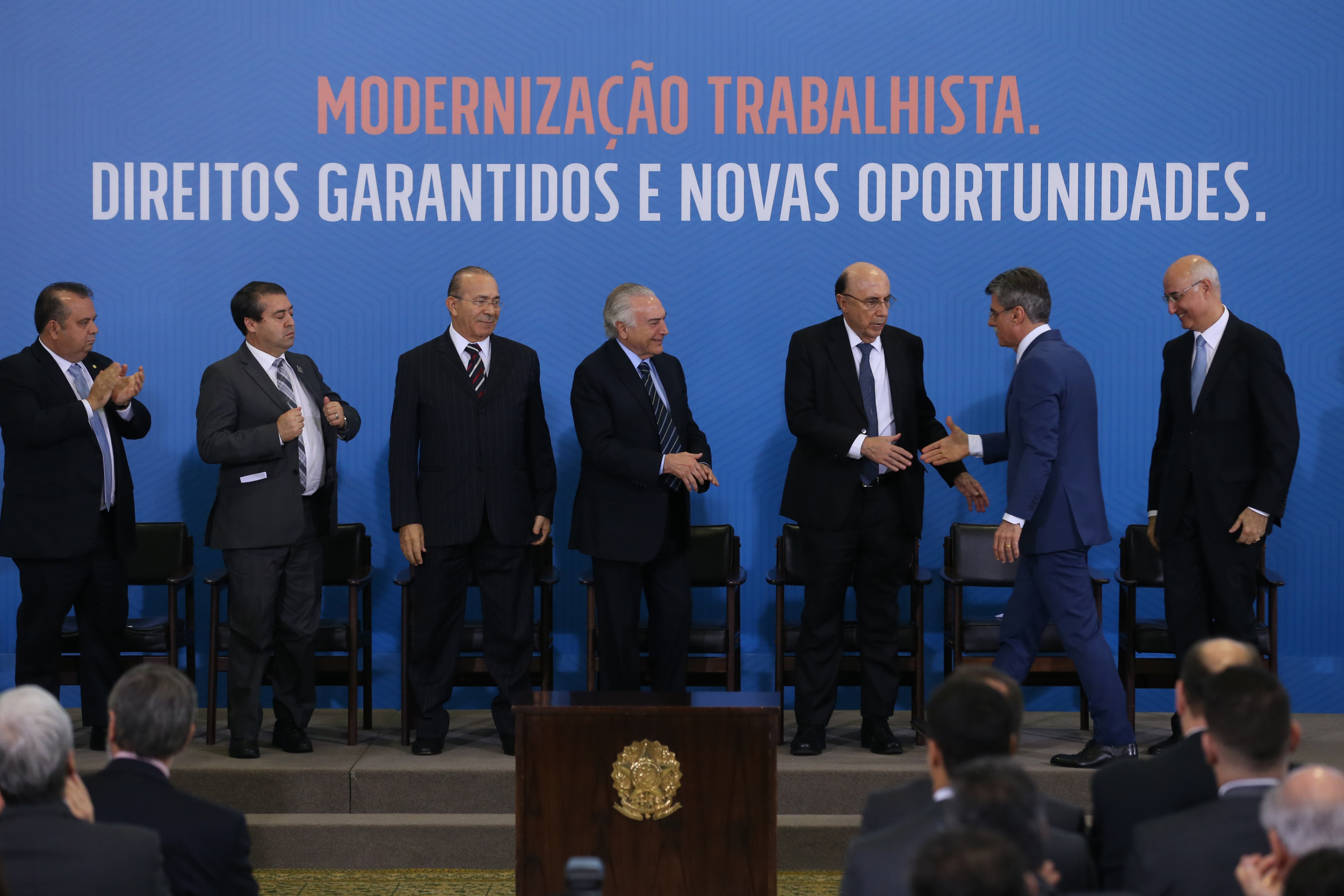
Temer, together with ministers and parliamentarians, giving a statement following the approval of the labour reform, 13 July 2017

On 11 July 2017, the Senate approved the government's proposal, but with restrictions. Negotiations between companies and workers now take precedence over the law on certain items, such as split holidays, flexible working hours, employee profit-sharing, lunch breaks, job and salary plans and time banking. However, items such as FGTS, minimum wage, 13th salary, unemployment insurance, social security benefits and maternity leave cannot be negotiated. The list of changes is very broad, affecting employment contracts on many points and establishing new rules in the labour court.

On 10 November, as promised, the government sent proposals for adjustments to the new legislation to Congress. The changes concerned the following items: working hours; off-balance-sheet damages; leave for pregnant women and infants; exclusive self-employment; intermittent work; employee representation in the workplace; and collective bargaining. The president intended to use a bill to avoid the excessive use of provisional measures, which was criticized by the president of the Chamber, Rodrigo Maia, but the senators wanted to use this legal instrument because it was part of the agreement that passed the original text so that it could go back to the Chamber. On 14 November, a provisional measure was issued to fulfill the agreement with the Senate. As a result, the reform took immediate effect, which would not have happened if it had been discussed by means of a bill.

Six months after the change in legislation, the first results could already be seen. At least 41,000 workers withdrew their FGTS to be dismissed by mutual agreement with their employers. Labour claims and lawsuits fell by around 45% because the costs became higher for workers, who felt inhibited. A similar drop occurred in claims for moral damages. Hiring for intermittent periods was much lower than expected, with few new jobs being created, just 15,000 instead of 55,000 per month. Trade union revenue fell sharply, despite legal action by the organizations to maintain collection. Collective agreements did not materialize as the government had hoped, and there was a drop when comparing the annual periods before and after the law. Unemployment rose after the reform began, despite greater flexibility in creating vacancies. The provisional measure aimed at perfecting the reform lost its validity before the vote and caused legal problems due to the effects already produced.

On 15 May, the Ministry of Labour published its view of the new legislation in the Official Gazette. In the form of a legal opinion prepared by the Federal Attorney General's Office, the document stated that the labour reform was valid for all employment contracts governed by the Consolidation of Labour Laws, including those that began before it came into force in November 2017. The opinion did not have the force of law, but was merely a guideline for ministry officials, who have a duty to monitor the application of the legislation. Meanwhile, the Federal Supreme Court began discussing the first case challenging the constitutionality of the new law. The justices were assessing whether a worker who is considered poor and entitled to free legal aid would be obliged to pay the costs of the case in the event of a defeat, as established by the reform. In addition, the Superior Labour Court was considering a case that questioned the scope of the new labour law, whether the rules would apply to new employment contracts as well as those signed before the law.

==== Outsourcing ====
On 22 March 2017, the House of Representatives approved a bill that allowed the outsourcing of work in any type of activity, no longer just in middle activities. By way of example, a school could hire both cleaners and teachers through outsourcing. The outsourced company would be responsible for hiring, paying and managing the workers. The contracting company would have to guarantee the safety, hygiene and health of the outsourced workers. Temporary employment contracts would be extended from three to six months and the dismissed worker would only be able to do the same job again after three months. This bill was sent to Congress in 1998 and was amended in the Senate in 2002, after which it returned to the Chamber; there were protests.

==== INSS analysis ====
The INSS analysis was a policy of re-evaluating beneficiaries of sick pay and disability pensions, decreed by Temer and then approved by Congress, which began in 2016. The aim was to detect possible fraud in these benefits and to save more than 8 billion reais a year. It targeted people who had not had their sickness benefits terminated and disability pensioners under the age of 60. The government would call a number of insured people and, after a pause, call another number.

Temer enacted two provisional measures: MP-739 of 2016, which decreed that, at any time, beneficiaries of sickness benefit and disability retirement could be summoned for new examinations; and MP-767 of 2017, which modified social security legislation to stipulate a new time count, for the purpose of waiting periods for the granting of sickness benefit, disability retirement and maternity pay, in the case of new affiliation to Social Security. After 120 days, MP-739 lost its effectiveness, and MP-767 resumed the comb-fine on 16 January 2017, after Bill 6427/2016, which legitimized the analysis, was not processed in Congress due to the parliamentary recess. The provisional measures also provided for "extra" remuneration for the experts, in the form of a bonus of R$60.00 per examination carried out.

In 2017, this policy was made official with Law 13457/17, approved by Congress, amending the 1991 law. Also that year, the BPC-LOAS benefits were combed through, focusing on people who had not registered with the CadÚnico for more than two years. Around 80% of sickness benefits were cancelled, and 30% of disability pensions. The government cancelled 9.6 billion in benefits.

=== Environmental policy ===
On 21 October 2017, Temer signed a decree granting a discount on fines for environmental crimes. The act was implemented in Mato Grosso do Sul and gave a discount of up to 60% on Ibama fines, with the remaining 40% being paid for through reforestation or recovery of degraded areas, as indicated by the government. Sarney Filho, the Minister of the Environment, justified this benefit on the grounds that it would encourage rural landowners to pay their debts to Ibama, thereby raising four billion reais. However, it was thought that the government's act was a way of getting the votes of the 200 ruralist deputies, on the eve of the second vote on the Attorney General's complaints against Temer.

== Foreign policy ==
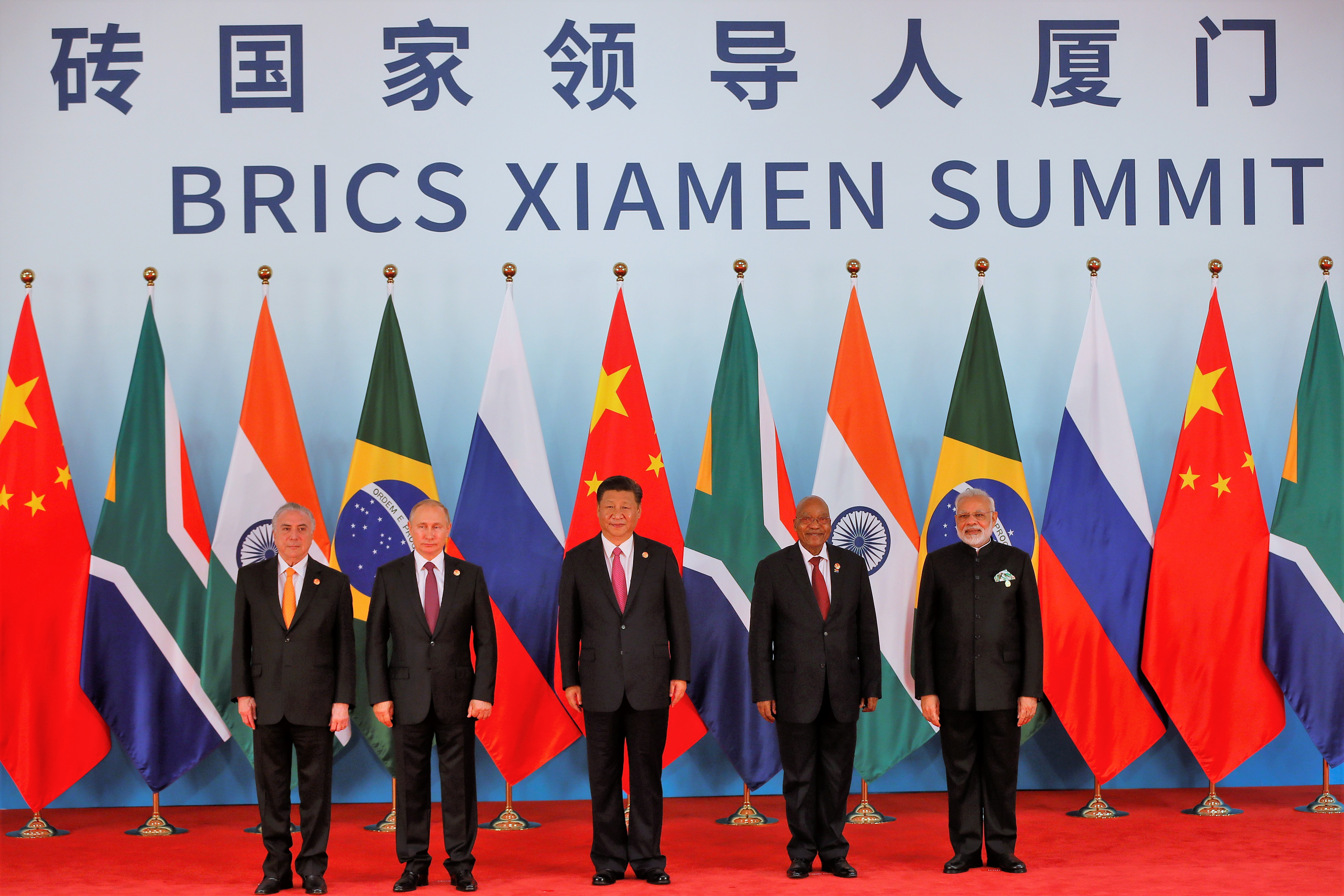
BRICS leaders in 2017

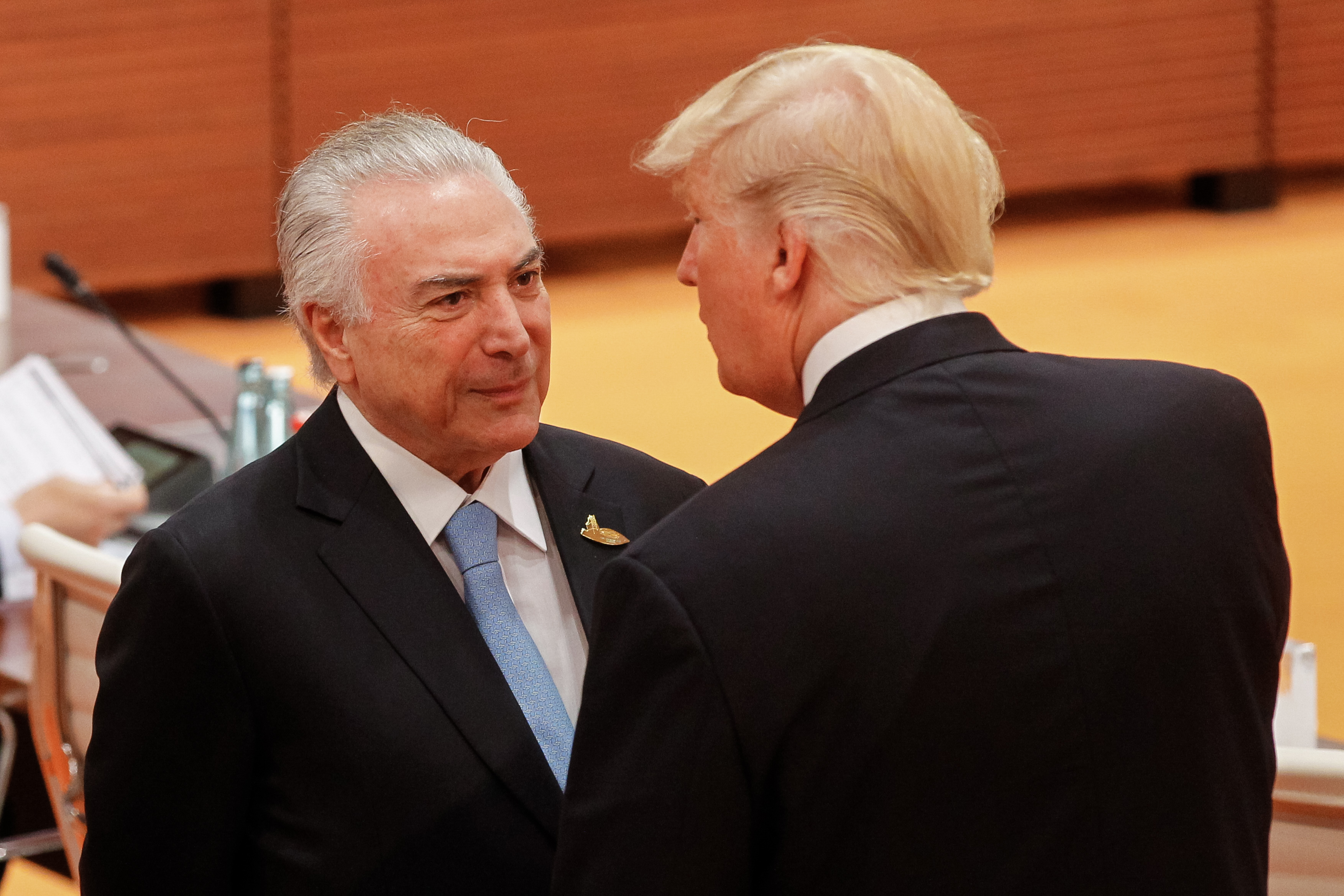
Michel Temer and US President Donald Trump during the G20 meeting in Hamburg.

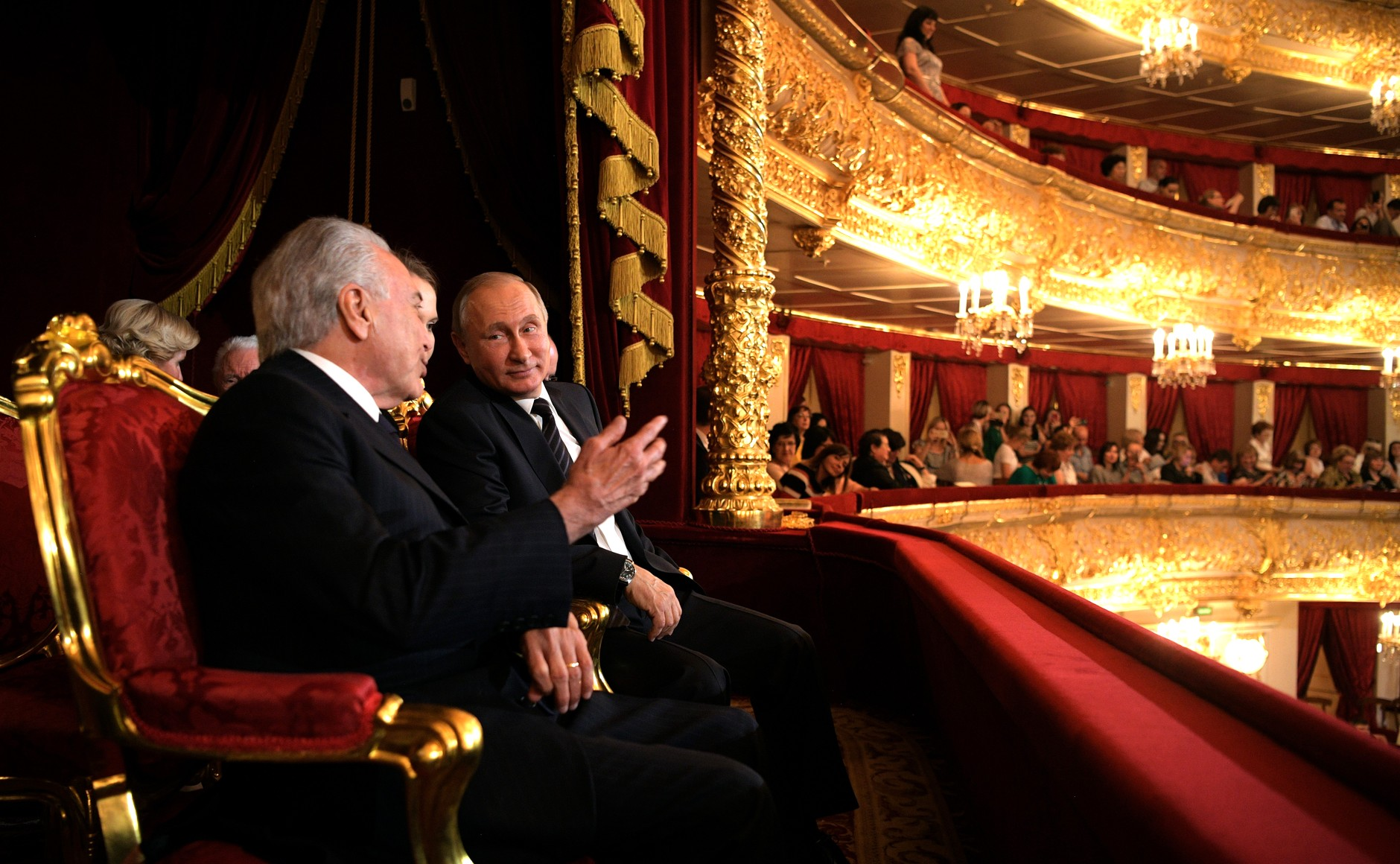
Temer and Russian President Vladimir Putin during a show at the Bolshoi Theater in Moscow.

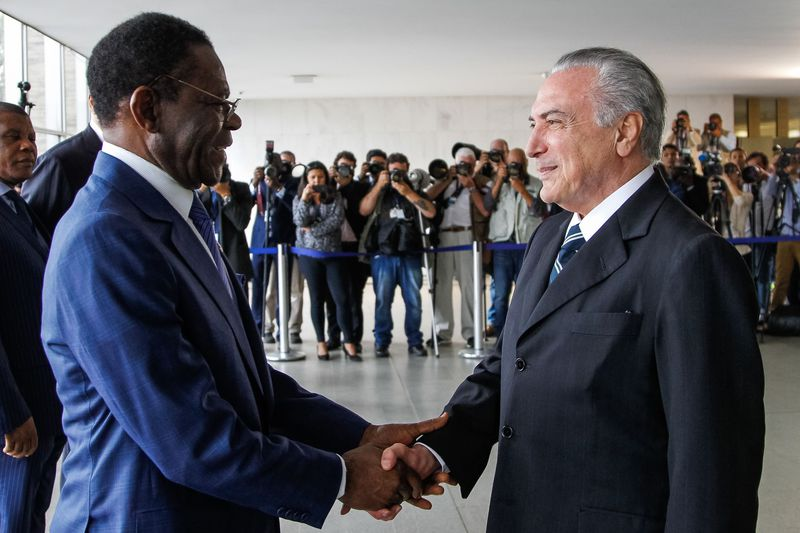
President Temer receives CPLP heads of state

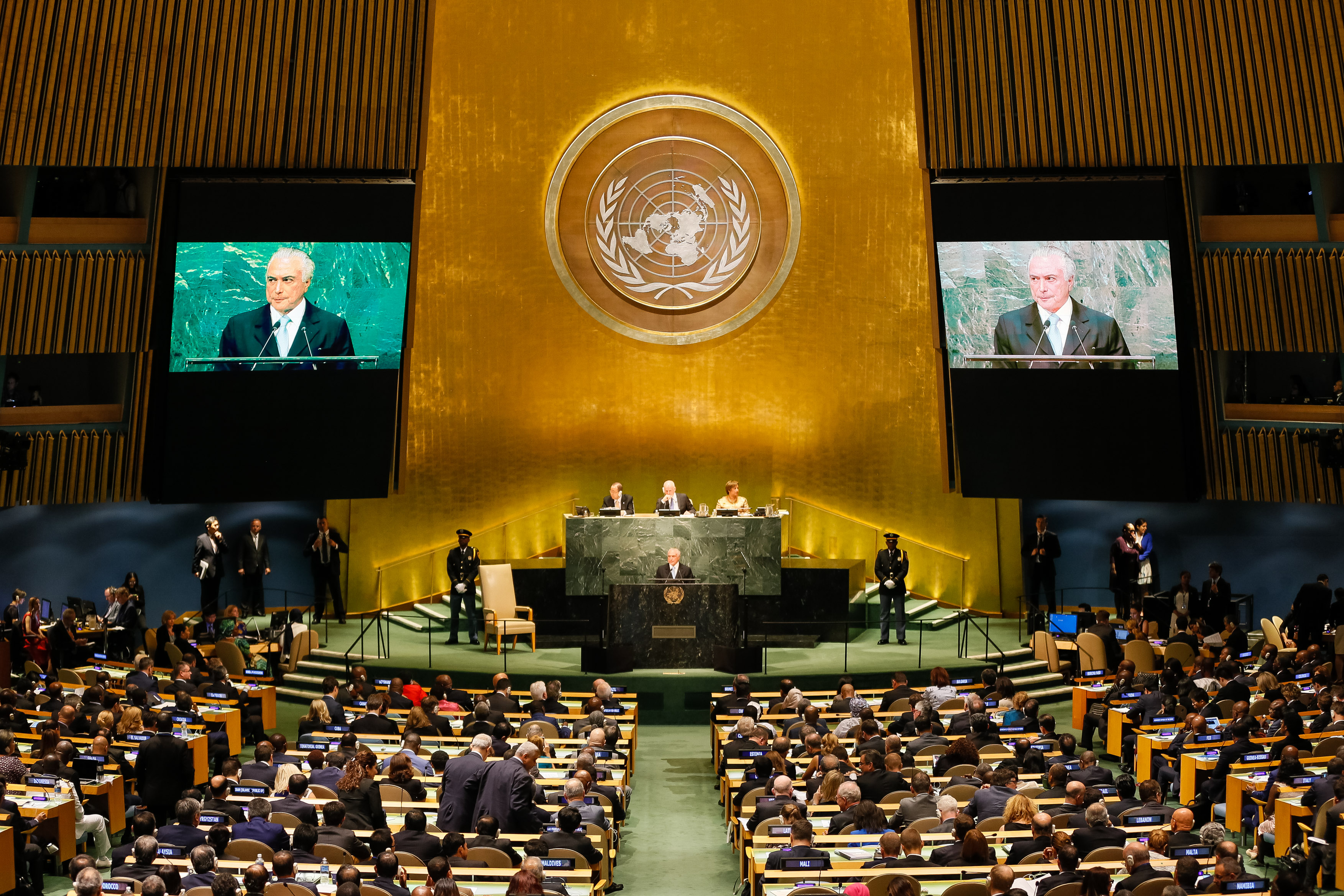
Temer at the 71st session of the United Nations General Assembly on 20 September 2016.

Itamaraty, led at the time by José Serra, threatened to change Brazil's vote at the 199th Session of Unesco, held in April 2016. The issue dealt with cultural heritage rights in the territories conquered by Israel in the Six Day War in Jerusalem, which are the subject of a dispute with Palestine. In a statement released on 9 June by Serra, the Brazilian government said that the decision did not expressly refer to the Jewish people's historical ties with Jerusalem, particularly the Western Wall, Judaism's holiest shrine, which was considered "an error that makes the text partial and unbalanced". The resolution approved in April at Unesco was critical of Israel and favourable to Palestine, and was presented on the initiative of the Arab representations – Algeria, Egypt, Lebanon, Morocco, Oman, Qatar and Sudan. There were 33 votes in favour, six against, 17 abstentions and two absences. Brazil voted in favour of the decision, along with BRICS countries such as China, India and South Africa, as well as countries like Spain, Sweden, Argentina and Mexico. Among the opposing countries were the United States and Germany.

On 17 June, the government suspended its negotiations with the European Union (EU) to receive families displaced by the civil war in Syria. The suspension was ordered by Alexandre de Moraes based on the argument that the government was taking a new stance on the reception of foreigners and border security. In March, the then Minister of Justice Eugênio Aragão visited the German ambassador in Brazil to discuss the reception of Syrians and told journalists that the country could take in around 100,000 refugees over the next five years, with the backing of Rousseff. The Brazilian initiative was considered exemplary by UNHCR (the UN agency for refugees) and contrasted with several nations that had been tightening their migration policies amid security concerns. However, interim president Temer summoned ministers and the Federal Police to a meeting on the subject, defining the strategy as an attempt to curb the entry of weapons and drugs and combat violence within the country.

In his first speech to the UN General Assembly on 20 September, Temer said that the impeachment process was legal and that Brazil was committed to democracy. The speech had five main points. Regarding the domestic scenario, Temer stated his concern for fiscal and social responsibility, nodding to the country's economic recovery and citing social programmes. Regarding the UN, he advocated a more active stance, capable of resolving world conflicts instead of just observing and condemning them. The president also mentioned the large number of refugees that Brazil had been sheltering, accounting for 95,000 people of 79 nationalities. On the external front, he supported interventions in Syria and in the dispute between Israel and Palestine, as well as agreements with Iran and North Korea, which are developing nuclear weapons. Temer listed many of Brazil's actions in international affairs, such as humanitarian aid in Haiti. Finally, he declared that his government would invest in technology and trade, calling for an end to protectionist measures, especially in the agricultural sector.

On 16 October, Temer attended the 8th BRICS Summit in India. He encouraged the group's companies to invest in Brazil, where they would find, according to him, "a country with political stability, legal security and great consumer freedom", and also invited Brazilian companies to invest in the bloc's countries. He said that his first measures represented signs of a return of confidence in the Brazilian economy, mentioning his efforts to reduce bureaucracy, operating costs, legal certainty and 34 projects in various areas. According to him, "those companies capable of structurally improving our economies, sectors that will strengthen our competitiveness and the global presence of the BRICS, will be especially welcome". As a whole, the entity has around 43% of the world's population, 30% of the world's Gross Domestic Product (GDP) and 17% of global trade, with the recovery of its member countries' economies at the heart of the meeting's agenda.

On 31 October, Temer received courtesy calls from heads of state who had come to Brazil to take part in the XI Conference of Heads of State and Government of the Community of Portuguese Language Countries (CPLP). At 10:30 am, he received the Secretary General-elect of the United Nations (UN), Antônio Guterres, on the ramp of the Planalto Palace. The CPLP is a conference that seeks to deepen cooperation between the nine member countries, with the aim of advancing projects in areas such as education, health, science and technology, defence, agriculture, public administration, communications, justice, public security, culture and sport. In addition to Brazil, the community includes Angola, Cape Verde, Guinea Bissau, Equatorial Guinea, Mozambique, Portugal, São Tomé and Príncipe and East Timor. The CLPL, which celebrated its 20th anniversary in 2016, closed on November 1. At the end of the event at Itamaraty, the Brasília Declaration defined the organization's work plan for the coming years. This year, the theme of the conference was the agenda for sustainable development in 2030. Brazil will chair the group for the next two years, in place of East Timor.

== Controversies ==
=== Demise of ministers ===
==== Romero Jucá ====
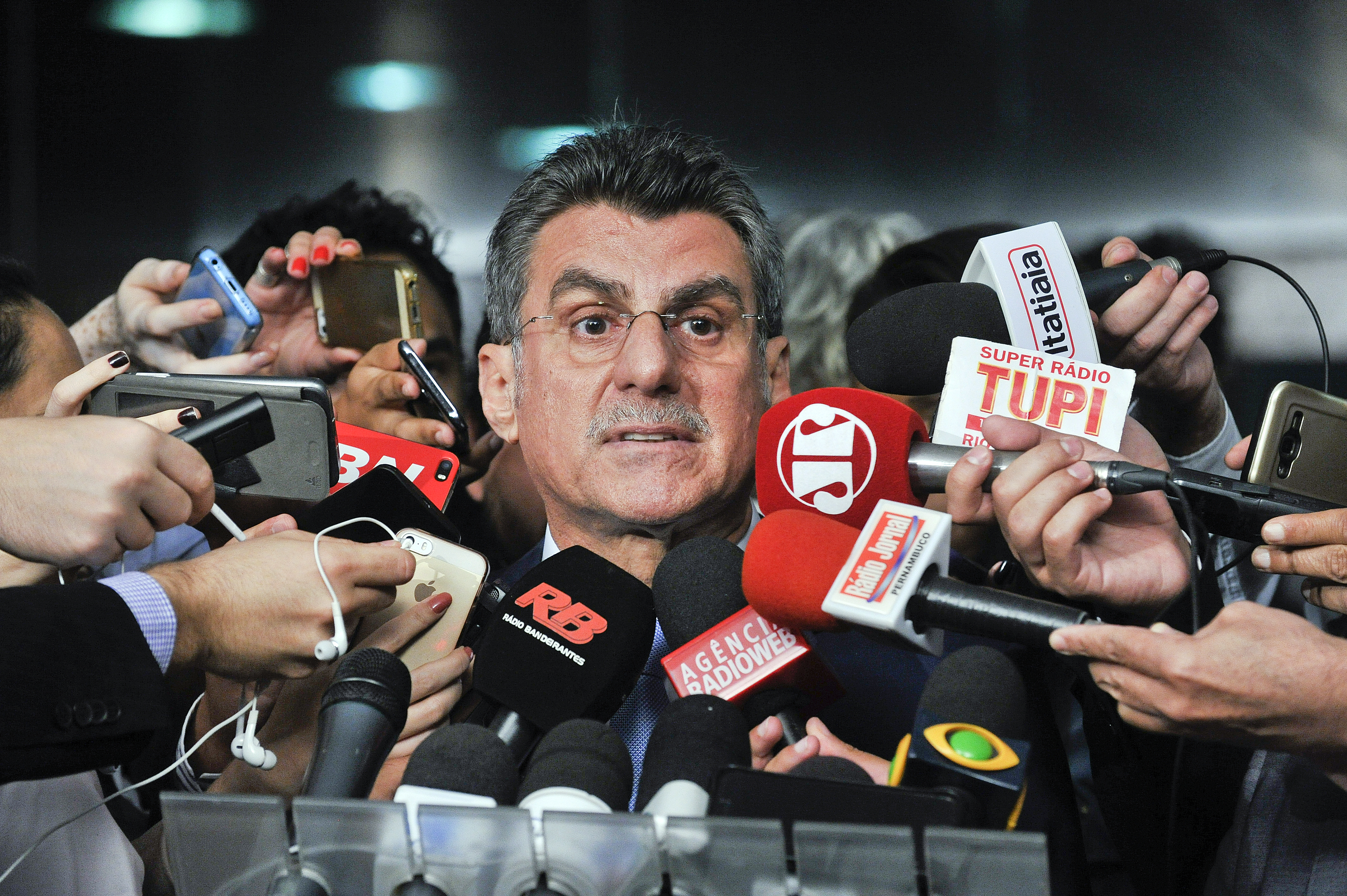
Romero Jucá, the first minister to leave the government

In just a few days of existence, the presidency of Michel Temer faced its first scandal and the first departure of a minister, after the newspaper Folha de S.Paulo released recordings of the Minister of Planning, Budget and Management, Romero Jucá, in a telephone conversation in March 2016 with the former president of Transpetro, Sérgio Machado. In the dialogue, when he was still a senator for the PMDB, Jucá suggested that a change in Rousseff's government could paralyze Operation Car Wash, which was investigating both interlocutors.

The conversation took place weeks before the impeachment vote in the Chamber of Deputies. Jucá was one of the opposition's main articulators and allegedly convinced MPs that Rousseff's removal, with a new government led by Temer, could be the political solution to stop the process led by Sergio Moro. According to Jucá, a possible Michel Temer government should build a national pact "with the Supreme Court, with everything", freeing all those under investigation. The senator cited conversations with Supreme Court justices and said that "they would have linked Rousseff's departure to the end of pressure from the press and other sectors to continue the Car Wash investigations".

With major negative repercussions in the national and international press, Jucá, who was a leading figure in the Temer government, had to leave the ministry; Dyogo Henrique de Oliveira took over on an interim basis. Ousted president Rousseff, who had been attending public events since the previous weekend, said that the recording confirms that the impeachment process is the result of a "coup consortium" interested in blocking investigations.

Days later, she once again considered the determination to obstruct Operation Car Wash, as well as the intention to set in motion an ultra-liberal policy in economics and conservative in everything else, as the real causes of the impeachment, and said that the Temer government was completely submissive to Eduardo Cunha, who allegedly demanded the appointment of his lawyer, Alexandre de Moraes, as justice minister. She also accused Temer of treason, which was allegedly committed before the impeachment, in March, when "things became very clear".

==== Fabiano Silveira ====
The second minister to leave office as a result ofMachado's recordings was Fabiano Silveira, who was head of the Transparency, Supervision and Control portfolio. In the audio, obtained through a plea bargain, Silveira discusses defence strategies for Car Wash defendants, making suggestions about the defence of Senate President Renan Calheiros, who is under investigation in the operation, as well as criticizing the work led by the task force. Temer didn't want to dismiss Silveira, as it would be his second resignation in eighteen days in office, but the minister himself asked for his departure in a phone call to the president, in which he said that "it had become untenable for him to remain in the government" and that he "preferred to leave because he didn't want to become a problem". In his farewell letter, he stated that he was "the target of unusual speculation". Silveira was a member of the National Council of Justice and was appointed minister by Jucá and Calheiros, although the latter denied any intervention in the Executive. Former minister Carlos Higino was appointed as his replacement on an interim basis.

In May 2016, the programme Fantástico had access to new excerpts from conversations recorded by the former president of Transpetro, Sérgio Machado, at a meeting at the home of the president of the Senate, Renan Calheiros, of the PMDB, with the participation of Fabiano Silveira, when he was still a member of the National Council of Justice (CNJ). In the recording, Fabiano Silveira criticized the conduct of the Car Wash Operation by the Attorney General's Office and gives advice to those being investigated in the work. In a statement, he said that he was "passing through" the official residence of the Senate, but that he was not aware of Sérgio Machado's presence and that he does not have and has never had any relationship with Machado. According to Fabiano, he was involuntarily involved in an informal conversation and has never made any gestures or interceded with public institutions on behalf of third parties.

==== Henrique Alves ====
The third resignation due to Machado's recordings was the former president of the Chamber of Deputies, Henrique Eduardo Alves (PMDB-RN), who was dismissed as tourism minister on 16 June. According to Machado, Alves allegedly received R$1.55 million in election donations from the bribery scheme investigated by the Car Wash operation. The former minister was suspected of being part of a group of PMDB politicians who supported former Petrobras supply director Paulo Roberto Costa to remain in office, in exchange for bribes intended for the PMDB. He was also suspected of having received bribes from petrolão for his campaign for the government of Rio Grande do Norte in 2014.

==== Marcelo Calero and Geddel Vieira Lima ====
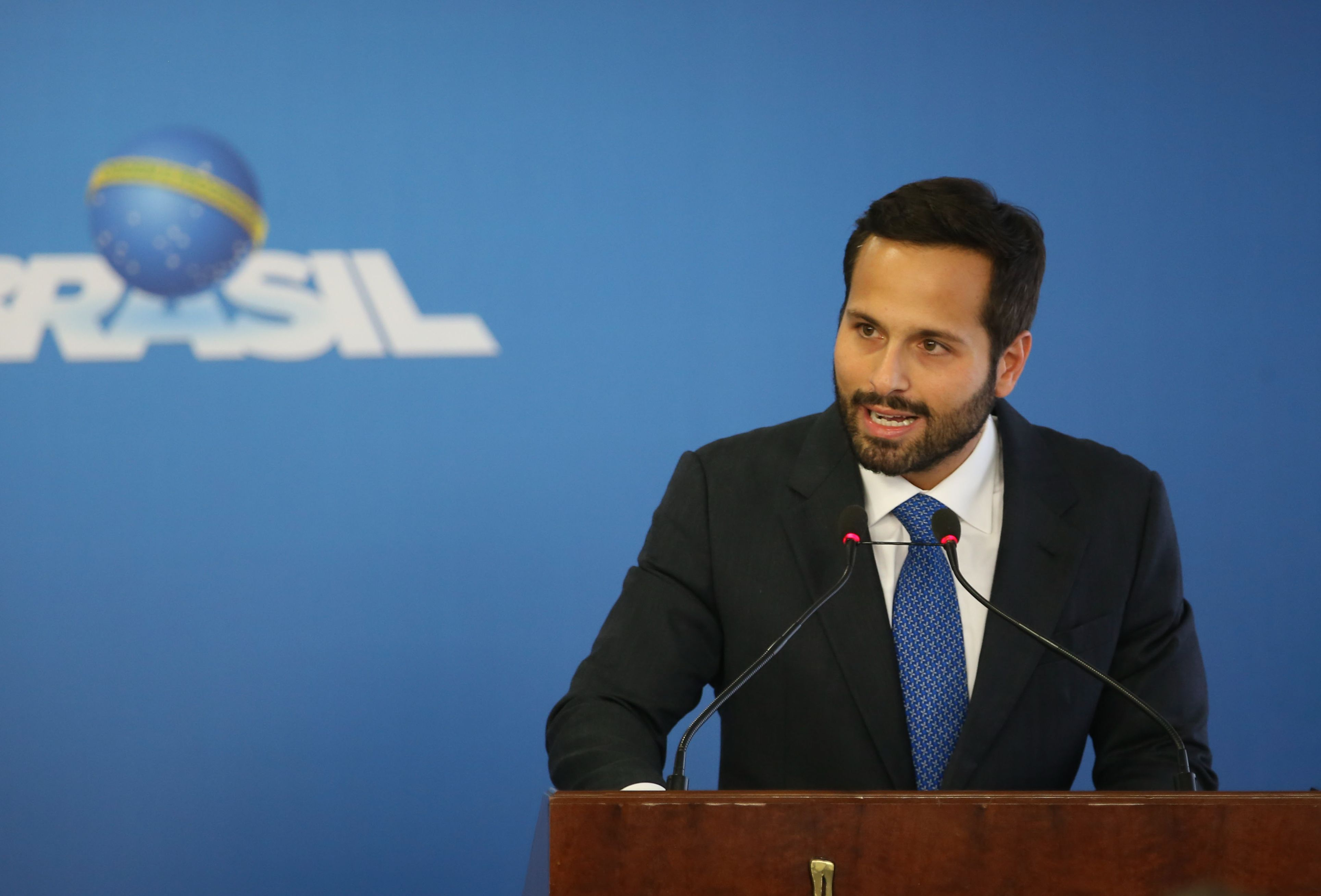
The Minister of Culture, Marcelo Calero, during a ceremony at the Planalto Palace

On 19 November 2016, then-Minister Geddel Vieira Lima, of the Secretariat of Government, was accused by former culture minister Marcelo Calero, in an interview with Folha de S.Paulo, of pressuring him to review a decision by the National Institute of Historic and Artistic Heritage (IPHAN) that prevented the construction of a real estate development where he had bought an apartment. In a statement to the Federal Police, revealed by the newspaper, Calero also said that President Temer "framed" him to find a "way out" of the work of interest to Geddel. As the political crisis evolved, including allegations of secret recordings, Geddel submitted a letter of resignation on the 25th. He became the sixth minister to leave the Temer government.

Later, in early September 2017, former minister Geddel Vieira Lima was arrested after 51 million reais in cash were seized from an apartment in the city of Salvador as part of Operation Lost Treasure. Geddel was very close to Michel Temer, having been his political liaison, and was under investigation by the Federal Police in Operation Cui Bono, which accused him of acting together with Eduardo Cunha in an illicit scheme at Caixa Econômica Federal. According to the Federal Police, they released funds from the bank to companies, which then repaid them by paying undue advantages. Geddel had already been imprisoned and was under house arrest but, with the discovery of the apartment in Salvador, he returned to the Papuda penitentiary in Brasília. The Federal Public Prosecutor's Office claimed that Geddel acted to avoid possible plea bargains from former president of the Chamber of Deputies Eduardo Cunha and businessman Lúcio Funaro, both imprisoned by Operation Car Wash and also investigated in Cui Bono.

==== Cristiane Brasil ====
Michel Temer appointed congresswoman Cristiane Brasil as labour minister on 4 January 2018. However, the courts in Rio de Janeiro suspended her appointment due to an accusation that she had violated the constitutional principle of morality, as she had been convicted in a labour debt case. The Federal Attorney General's Office appealed to the Superior Court of Justice and managed to keep her in office, but this was again prevented by the president of the Federal Supreme Court, Cármen Lúcia. In February, the newspaper O Estado de São Paulo published a report, confirmed by TV Globo, according to which the deputy was being investigated for drug trafficking and association. The article claimed that Cristiane Brasil's advisors paid drug dealers to have the exclusive right to campaign in Cavalcanti, a neighborhood in Rio de Janeiro, and that presidents of neighbourhood associations were taken to talk to the head of drug trafficking in the region because they were refusing to work for the congresswoman. Cristiane was a councillor in 2010, at the time of the events reported.

=== Deposition efforts ===
==== Impeachment proposals ====
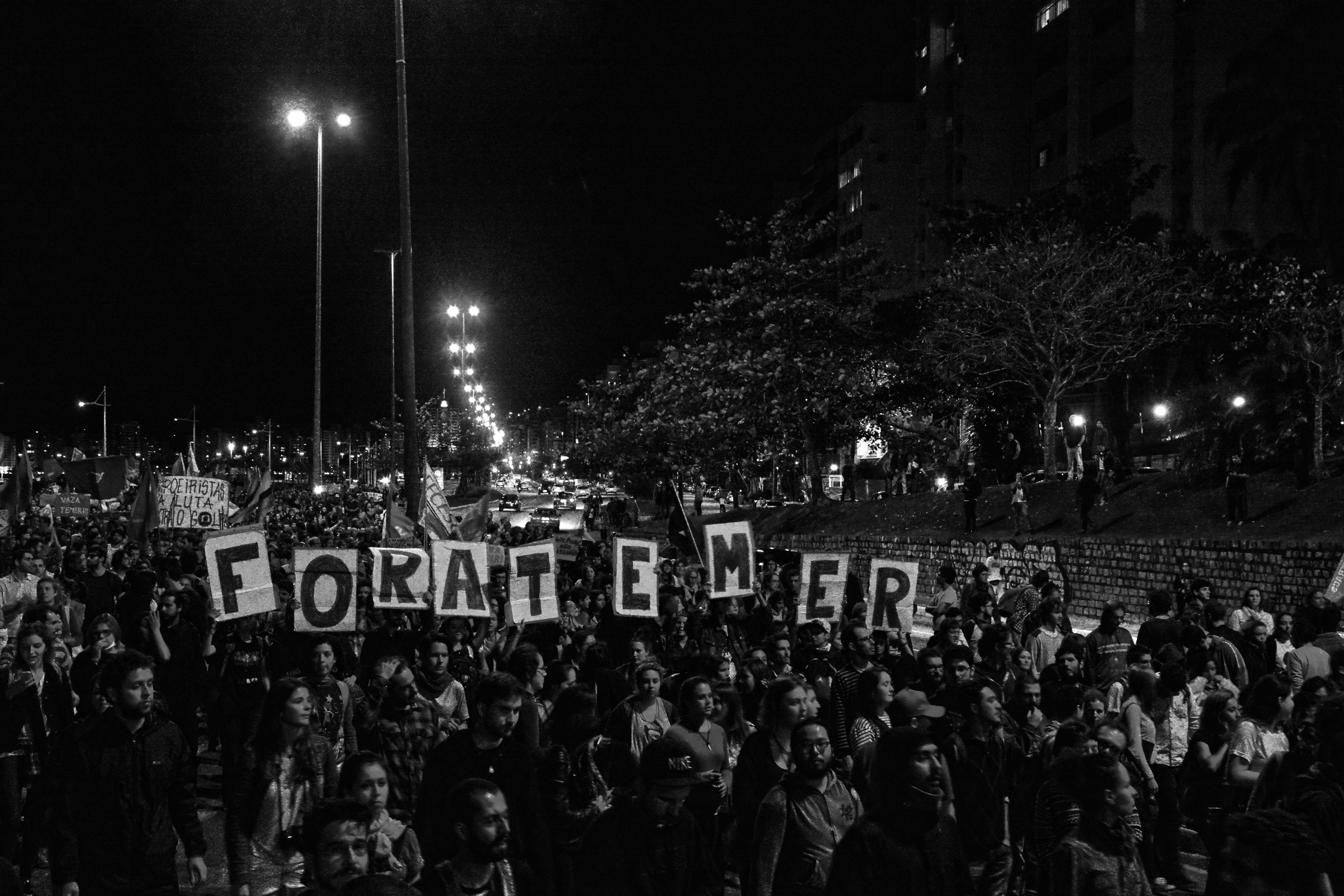
Demonstration against the Temer government in Florianópolis

On 8 December 2016, social movements filed an impeachment petition against Temer in the Chamber of Deputies. The document was signed by nineteen people, including lawyers and leaders of civil society organizations, such as the Unified Workers' Central (CUT) and the National Union of Students (UNE). According to the text, there were "strong indications of illegal acts" on the part of Michel Temer in the episode in which the former Chief Minister of the Secretariat of Government, Geddel Vieira Lima, pressured the former Minister of Culture, Marcelo Calero, to intervene with IPHAN to release the construction of a high-end building in Salvador, where Geddel had purchased a property. Marcelo Neves, professor of Public Law at the University of Brasília, one of the jurists who accompanied the group, said that the president's conduct fell within the crimes set out in articles 7 and 9 of the Crimes of Responsibility Law, which deal with abuse of power in the exercise of public office. He also pointed to the commission of the common crimes of concussion and administrative advocacy, provided for in articles 316 and 321 of the Brazilian Criminal Code.

==== New elections ====
The crises in the Temer government have made Senators Acir Gurgacz and Romário re-evaluate Dilma Rousseff's impeachment. "Rousseff's possible agreement to call new elections could put her back in office, although she also causes fear because of her irresponsibility, her inconsequence," they said. In just 21 days, the government has suffered many setbacks and criticisms, creating a situation in which the admissibility of the impeachment could be reversed. Even those who voted to remove the president acknowledged that there was turbulence in the interim government. Dilma's return could have serious consequences, such as the approval of a constitutional amendment providing for a plebiscite to elect a new president and vice-president during the 2016 municipal elections. In this way, the Superior Electoral Court would call elections thirty days after the plebiscite was approved by an absolute majority. The elected officials' terms would end in 2018.

==== Charges of common crimes ====
On 17 May, it was reported that the owners of the JBS meatpacking company said, in a plea bargain with the Attorney General's Office, that they had recorded Temer authorizing Joesley Batista to offer money to Eduardo Cunha, the convicted deputy and former president of the Chamber of Deputies, and to the broker Lúcio Funaro (both imprisoned by Operation Car Wash), so that they would remain silent before the courts. In the same recording, made by businessman Joesley Batista in March 2017, Temer appoints deputy Rodrigo Rocha Loures to resolve matters at J&F, a holding company that controls the JBS meatpacker. Later, Rocha Lourdes was filmed receiving a suitcase containing five hundred thousand reais, sent by Joesley.

In an official statement, Temer said that "he never requested payments to obtain the silence of former deputy Eduardo Cunha. He did not participate in or authorize any move aimed at avoiding a plea bargain or collaboration with the courts by the former congressman". The Brazilian Bar Association, in an official statement, called for a "swift investigation into the alleged obstruction of justice practiced by the President of the Republic". According to the Federal Constitution, obstruction of justice is one of the crimes that can lead to impeachment proceedings against Temer. On the other hand, however, the immunity granted to the president prevents him from being subjected to arrest, including in flagrante or preventive detention. In Congress, members of parties such as REDE, PSOL and PT have endorsed Temer's removal, either by resignation or impeachment. Deputy Efraim Filho, leader of the DEM, a party allied to the government, said: "The investigation of the facts will tell us if there has been any infringement of the Constitution. If there is any infringement of the Constitution, the rite of impeachment must be followed, as it was with President Dilma".

On 18 May, minister Edson Fachin, rapporteur of Operation Car Wash at the Federal Supreme Court (STF), authorized the opening of an investigation into Temer. Fachin's decision was based on a statement by the Attorney General, Rodrigo Janot, according to which Temer and ousted senator Aécio Neves acted "in articulation" to impede the progress of the operation. The inquiry should be opened to investigate Temer, Aécio and ousted deputy Rodrigo Rocha Loures for crimes of passive corruption, obstruction of justice and criminal organization. In Janot's words: "In addition, it appears that Aécio Neves, in conjunction, among others, with Temer, has sought to prevent the Car Wash investigations from moving forward, either through legislative measures or by controlling the appointment of police chiefs who will conduct the investigations"; and "In this way, we also see the possible commission of the crime of obstruction of justice". Temer's and Aécio's advisors released notes denying all the accusations.

As a result of this investigation, Temer was indicted twice by the PGR. The accusations were forwarded to the STF, but the opening of proceedings would have to be authorized by the Chamber of Deputies, requiring the approval of two-thirds of the deputies (342). If the vote was favourable, the Supreme Court could try Temer. If the Supreme Court accepted the complaint, criminal proceedings would begin and the president would be removed from office for up to 180 days. Once convicted, Temer would be permanently removed from office, lose his political rights and could be imprisoned, considering that the penalty for the crime is imprisonment. Finally, the Speaker of the House would take over on an interim basis and an indirect election would be called within thirty days. However, both complaints were dismissed.

==== First criminal complaint ====
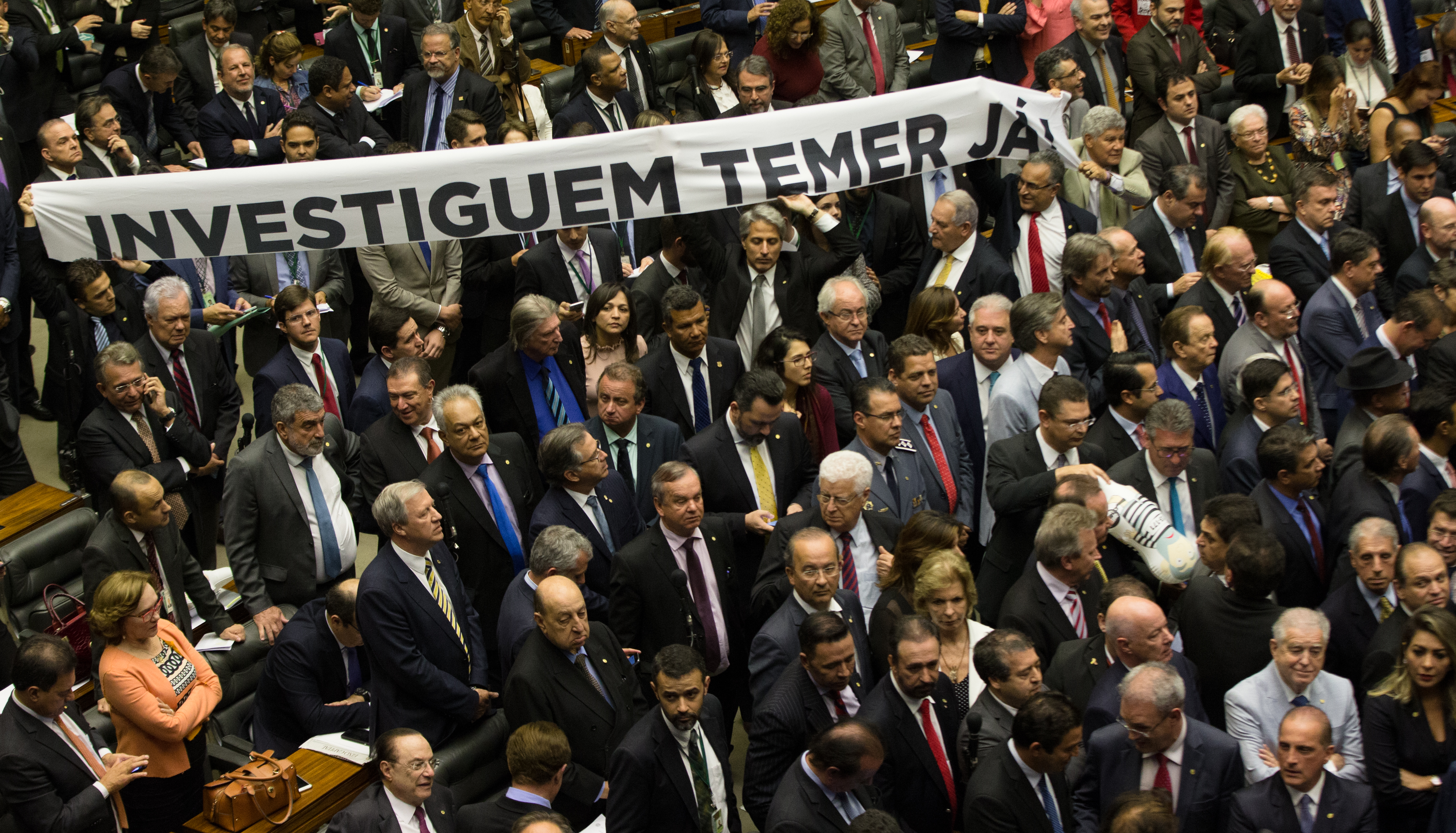
Opposition parliamentarians protest against Temer in the Chamber of Deputies during the vote on the first complaint

On 26 June, the Prosecutor General of the Republic, Rodrigo Janot, filed a formal complaint against Temer for the crime of passive corruption. The basis of the case was the indictment of JBS executives, in which Janot considered that Temer received bribes to benefit the company in the Administrative Council for Economic Defence (Cade). In his defence, Temer said that he "simply listened" to the businessman's complaints, without granting any state benefits to JBS, and that he would not resign from office. Michel Temer became the first Brazilian president to answer for a crime while in office.

Janot accused Temer of being the final recipient of a suitcase containing five hundred thousand reais and a promise of another 38 million in undue benefits, both from the company JBS. The intermediary in the operations was, according to Janot, former federal deputy and Temer's former advisor, Rodrigo Rocha Loures, who has been in prison since 18 May. He was filmed by the Federal Police as he ran with the suitcase used to transport the money. Janot asked that Temer be sentenced to lose his position as president and also be ordered to pay ten million reais in moral damages to the community. As for Temer's former advisor, he asked for the payment of two million reais.

On 2 August, Congress rejected the complaint against Michel Temer by 263 votes to 227.

=== Second criminal complaint ===
On 11 September, the Federal Police presented the final report of an investigation into the actions of members of the PMDB in the Chamber of Deputies, which concluded that there was evidence that the president, along with members of his party, was part of a criminal organization that maintained a scheme to pay bribes to state-owned companies. On 14 September, the PGR submitted a new criminal complaint against Temer to the Supreme Court, this time for the crimes of obstruction of justice and criminal organization. In addition to the president, Eliseu Padilha (minister of the Civil House), Moreira Franco (minister of the General Secretariat), Geddel Vieira Lima (former minister), Henrique Eduardo Alves (former deputy and former minister), Eduardo Cunha (former deputy), Rocha Loures (former deputy), Joesley Batista and Ricardo Saud would also be indicted.

On 25 October, the Chamber of Deputies rejected sending this new complaint to the Supreme Court by 251 votes to 233 (with two abstentions and 25 absent), a lower number than the first pool, which had 263 votes in favour of the president. In addition, the result was below the government's expectations, which were between 260 and 270 votes in favour. As a result, Temer was freed from having to answer the charges during his term in office, but would still have to do so after the end of his term. The session lasted twelve hours and twenty minutes and the deputies approved the report of the Constitution and Justice Committee, drawn up by deputy Bonifácio de Andrada, which recommended rejecting the complaint. President Temer acted to get the votes he needed, releasing amendments to his allied base and dismissing ministers who held deputy posts so that they could vote too.

=== The Ports Case ===
On 12 September, the Supreme Federal Court (STF), at the request of the Prosecutor General of the Republic (PGR), authorized the opening of yet another investigation against Michel Temer with the aim of investigating the suspected favouring of a port company in Santos, which was allegedly done through a decree regulating the sector. At the time, Temer was already the target of two inquiries at the Supreme Court, both on suspicion of corruption.

==== Imprisonment of friends ====
On 29 March, the Federal Police (PF) arrested two friends of Temer, lawyer José Yunes, a former special presidencial advisor, and João Baptista Lima Filho, a former colonel in the São Paulo Military Police. The detentions took place at the request of the Prosecutor General of the Republic, Raquel Dodge, as part of Operation Skala, launched on the same day by the Federal Police in São Paulo and Rio de Janeiro. Other people arrested in the operation were: businessman Antônio Celso Greco, owner of the Rodrimar company, which operates in the Port of Santos; former Minister of Agriculture and former federal deputy Wagner Rossi, who, between 1999 and 2000, was CEO of Companhia Docas do Estado de São Paulo, the state-owned company that manages the Port of Santos; Milton Ortolan, Rossi's assistant; and Celina Torrealba, one of the owners of the Libra Group. The operation was authorized by Minister Luís Roberto Barroso, of the Supreme Federal Court (STF), who is investigating whether Temer, through a decree, benefited companies in the port sector in exchange for allegedly receiving bribes.

==== Suspicion of money laundering ====
The Federal Police's investigation has suggested that Temer laundered bribe money by paying for renovations to properties owned by his own family. The information was published on 27 April by the Folha de S. Paulo newspaper, which also stated that, in addition to laundering money from construction projects, Michel Temer had concealed real estate transactions on behalf of third parties. According to the article, Temer's wife, Marcela, and the presidential couple's son own some of the properties that were renovated with the help of bribes. The investigation arose in the wake of an inquiry into the issuing of a decree for the port sector, which allegedly benefited companies in the industry in exchange for bribes. In response, Temer said that the attack was of a moral nature and that only irresponsible people would try to incriminate his wife and nine-year-old son. He also said that, during his lifetime, he had amassed the financial resources to buy and renovate real estate.

=== Accusations ===
==== Sérgio Machado ====
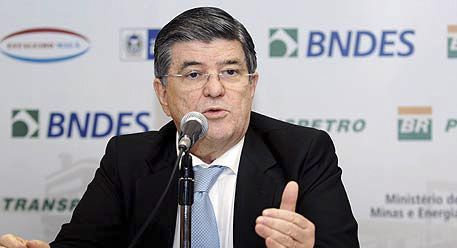
Sérgio Machado.

Sérgio Machado's plea bargain led the Car Wash investigation directly to Temer. According to the report, Temer allegedly asked Machado for illicit funds for Gabriel Chalita's (PMDB) campaign for mayor of São Paulo in 2012. Twenty politicians were named in the Transpetro bribery scheme. The financial resources were obtained from contractors who made official donations or monthly payments of bribes in currency, with the aim of maintaining their contracts with the state-owned company, controlled by the PMDB. Machado became director of Transpetro in 2003, on the recommendation of the president of the Senate, Renan Calheiros, senators Jader Barbalho, Romero Jucá, Edison Lobão and former president José Sarney, all members of the PMDB and all named by the informant as beneficiaries of the scheme.

In his video and audio testimony to the Prosecutor General of the Republic, Sérgio Machado gave details of the bribe paid in the Chalita case. He said that he had been approached by Senator Valdir Raupp, who reported financial difficulties in the 2012 election campaign for São Paulo mayor and asked if Machado could help. He called Temer and set up a meeting at Brasília's military airport, in the room next to the President's office, in September of that year, at the start of the night. He said that he could help with 1.5 million reais and that the donation would be made by the National Directory through the Queiroz Galvão company. Temer called the accusation "irresponsible, frivolous, untruthful and criminal" and said he would not let these "frivolous accusations" go unheard.

==== Andrade Gutierrez executives ====
In November 2016, the Superior Electoral Court (TSE) summoned Otávio Marques de Azevedo, former president of the construction company Andrade Gutierrez and one of the Car Wash informants, to clarify the donation of 1 million reais that the contractor, according to his previous version, made to former president Rousseff's 2014 campaign, as part of a 1% kickback arrangement for Andrade's contracts with the federal government. Dilma's defence presented the court with a check attesting that there was, in fact, a payment of 1 million reais to the National Directorate of the PMDB, with a transfer destined for the election of the then vice-president. The current case before the TSE could result in the annulment of the 2014 presidential ticket.

In a statement, the PMDB said that "it has always raised funds according to the legal parameters in force in the country", and that "all the PMDB's accounts have been approved, and no evidence of irregularity has been found".

==== Odebrecht executives and related investigations ====
According to the plea bargain of Claudio Melo Filho, a former Odebrecht director in Brasília, Civil House minister, Eliseu Padilha, was the operator of the company's transfers to Temer. Melo said that he used Eliseu Padilha or Moreira Franco to get his requests to Temer. In this way, Eliseu Padilha was Temer's representative with whom Melo was in constant contact to obtain favours. Based on the report in Veja magazine, Padilha, whose nickname is "Primo", received four million reais from Odebrecht out of the ten million reais in financial aid requested by Temer from the contractor Marcelo Odebrecht, at a dinner held at the Jaburu Palace in May 2014. Of these funds, one million reais was passed on by Padilha to former president of the Chamber of Deputies Eduardo Cunha, imprisoned in Operation Car Wash. The other part was delivered to the office of lawyer José Yunes, a close friend and special advisor to Temer. The president's press office denied any irregular operations between the people mentioned.

On 15 December, Veja reported a new accusation against Temer. According to the magazine, in 2010, Michel Temer received Márcio Faria da Silva, one of the main executives of the construction company Odebrecht, at his political office in São Paulo, for a conversation which was also attended by Eduardo Cunha and the lobbyist João Augusto Henriques, a collector of bribes for the PMDB within Petrobras. On that occasion, Silva mediated a transfer of funds at the request of Temer and former deputy Eduardo Cunha, linked to the execution of the contractor's contracts with Petrobras. The information was included in the plea bargain agreement signed by the executive. The Planalto Palace confirmed the meeting, but said that it lasted about twenty minutes and only dealt with formalities, not financial issues. "If, after his conversation with Temer, Eduardo Cunha made any arrangements or negotiated amounts for the campaign, it is Eduardo Cunha's own responsibility," said Temer's advisors.

On 11 April 2017, Temer was named in two Supreme Federal Court (STF) investigations linked to the complex Operation Car Wash. The first investigated ministers Eliseu Padilha, chief minister of the Civil House, and Moreira Franco, minister of the General Secretariat of the Presidency, on charges of receiving bribes in the 2014 election campaign. The second investigated Senator Humberto Costa, also suspected of receiving bribes. Temer was accused of participating in both cases of alleged corruption. Marcelo Odebrecht had previously confirmed to the Superior Electoral Court (TSE) that he had met with Temer to discuss donations for the 2014 election campaign. In addition, the former director of institutional relations for the Odebrecht Group, Claudio Melo Filho, had also stated that a contribution of 10 million reais to the PMDB had been agreed.

STF Minister Edson Fachin authorized the opening of 76 investigations involving eight ministers, 24 senators, 39 deputies and three governors, as well as a minister of the Federal Court of Accounts (TCU) and 23 other people, based on the Odebrecht plea bargain. However, the president could not be investigated for crimes that did not occur while in office, so the Prosecutor General of the Republic (PGR) did not include him on the list of politicians who became targets of proceedings before the Supreme Court. There were eight Temer government ministers among the targets of investigations: Eliseu Padilha (Civil House), Moreira Franco (General Secretariat of the Presidency), Aloysio Nunes (Foreign Relations), Gilberto Kassab (Science and Technology), Blairo Maggi (Agriculture), Bruno Araújo (Cities), Marcos Antônio Pereira (Foreign Trade) and Helder Barbalho (National Integration). Michel Temer reaffirmed the course of action he had already taken. If there was a request for a complaint and it was accepted, then the minister would be removed. If he became a defendant, the minister would be dismissed. The president, however, feared that Fachin's list would affect the approval of reforms in Congress, such as the social security and labour reforms.

=== Prison system crisis ===
Faced with the difficult events that took place in prisons at the beginning of 2017, the newspaper Folha de S.Paulo brought together eight experts to explain the main problems of the Brazilian prison system and to propose long-term solutions. The first cause was pre-trial detention, which refers to prisoners who have not yet been tried (40% of the total). Disarticulation was the second cause pointed out. The various authorities take decisions in an uncoordinated manner, and cooperation and monitoring are therefore lacking.

The slow pace of justice was seen as the third cause. Many pre-trial detainees spend longer in jail than their subsequent convictions, leading to a feeling of revolt, which results in violence. Next was the lack of legal aid. Half of pre-trial detainees are acquitted and the other half receive sentences that are shorter than the time they spent in jail. Overcrowding, also mentioned, refers to the 42% surplus among the country's 622,0000 prisoners, leading to a lack of assistance for inmates and the establishment of factions.

The experts also commented on the consequences of the scenario described. The first is the lack of separation between pre-trial detainees and convicted prisoners and, within the latter, between those of different natures and seriousness of their crimes. In addition, overcrowding and a lack of investment jeopardize the educational training of prisoners. In fact, only 13% of prisoners study either formally or informally. Inmates' health is also severely compromised, with few health modules and a high prevalence of diseases such as tuberculosis.

In this way, the government fails in its duty to re-educate prisoners, who leave jail more dangerous than when they entered. The lack of concern results in outdated data on prisons, leading to the suggestion that the units should be inspected by human rights organizations. The void left by the authorities allows the formation of factions, which guarantee internal order with the connivance of prison directors. Finally, prisoners don't work, due to the ineffectiveness of contracts between the state and private entities, as well as the low qualifications of candidates.

On 25 January 2017, the members of the National Council for Criminal and Penitentiary Policy resigned in an open letter to Alexandre de Moraes, the then Minister of Justice. In the text, they harshly criticized the minister's prison policy and his statements "that we need more guns and less research".

=== Moving to the Jaburu Palace ===
After making changes to the Alvorada Palace that inspired questions about the building's historical heritage, Michel Temer decided to vacate the residence and move to the Jaburu Palace. In an interview with Veja magazine, he said that he couldn't sleep in the "large rooms" and that the palace might have ghosts.

=== Operation Weak Meat ===
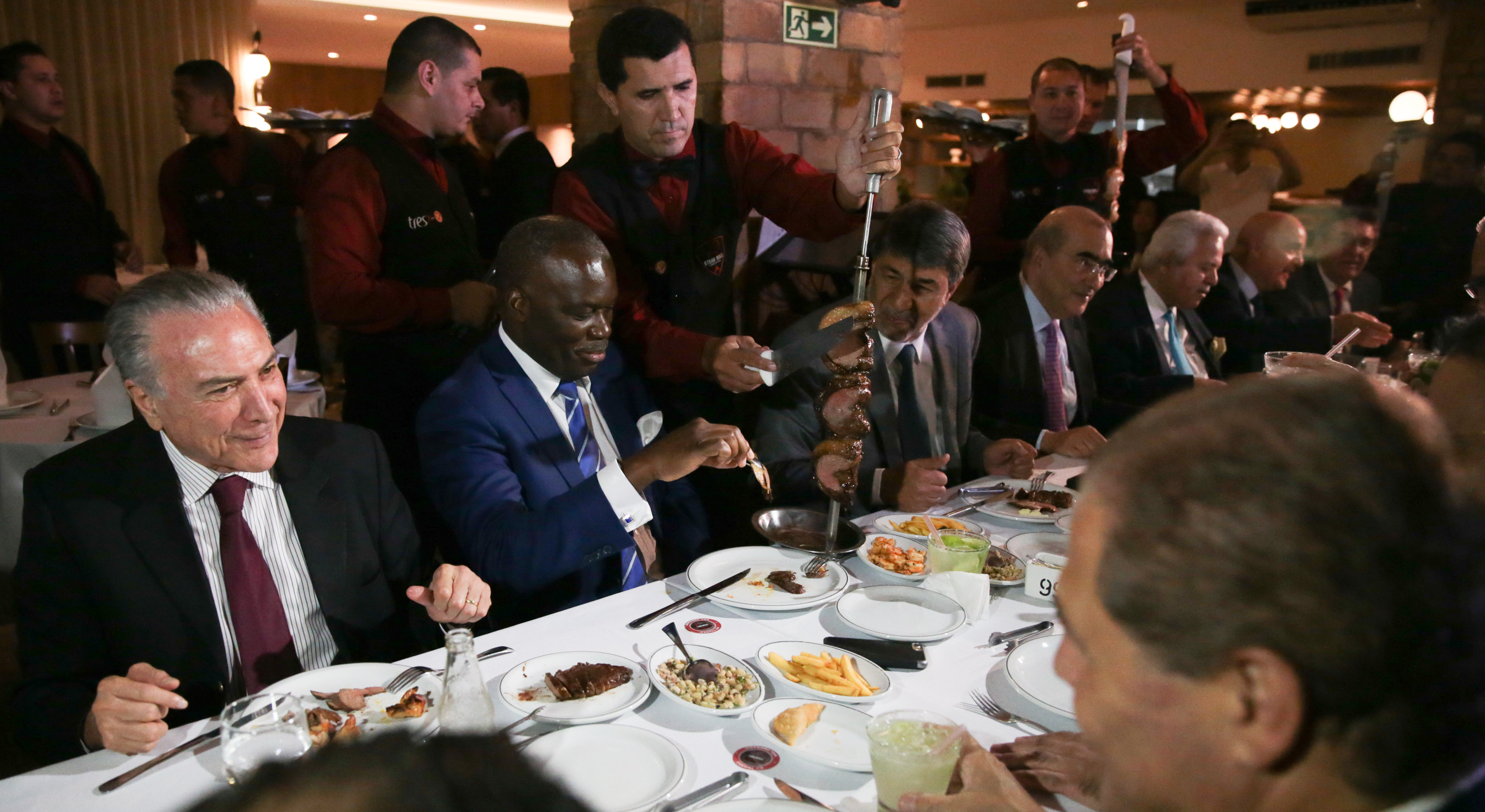
Temer having dinner at a steakhouse in Brasília, alongside ambassadors, on 19 March 2017

On 17 March 2017, the Federal Police launched Operation Weak Meat, which investigated a fraudulent scheme formed by meatpacking companies and Ministry of Agriculture officials, with the purpose of adulterating meat sold in supermarkets with chemical additives, particularly vitamin C, used to produce a healthy appearance in spoiled beef. According to the police, "the public agents, using the supervisory power of their position by paying bribes, acted to facilitate the production of adulterated food, issuing health certificates without any effective inspection".

In a phone call intercepted by the PF, justice minister Osmar Serraglio called the regional superintendent of the Ministry of Agriculture, Daniel Gonçalves Filho, a "big boss". Daniel was identified by the Federal Police as the leader of a gang that facilitated the production of adulterated meat and issued false inspection certificates. Senator Kátia Abreu said that then deputy Serraglio approached her to try to keep Daniel as regional superintendent, despite the fact that he was facing an administrative disciplinary process. On 19 March 2017, Temer had dinner at a steakhouse in Brasília with ambassadors from countries that import Brazilian meat. Temer personally invited these representatives after a meeting held to ensure that Brazilian meat was fit for consumption.

=== Use of the Armed Forces to contain demonstrations in Brasília ===
On 24 May, a protest organized by trade unions resulted in a confrontation between demonstrators, who were advancing towards Congress, and the Military Police, who tried to contain them using tear gas bombs. The action caused the buildings of the ministries of Culture, Planning and Agriculture to catch fire. Temer ordered the Armed Forces to take action to contain the demonstrations in Brasília, with the military deployed between 24–31 May. Defence minister Raul Jungmann said that Temer had decreed an "action to guarantee law and order". In his words, "At this moment, federal troops are in this [Planalto] Palace, in the Itamaraty Palace and soon troops will be arriving to ensure that the buildings of the ministries are kept unharmed."

There was a great uproar in the Chamber of Deputies, with the current session being suspended and demonstrators gathered on the Esplanade of Ministries to call for Temer's departure. The minister said that the use of federal troops in Brasília was requested by the President of the Chamber of Deputies, Rodrigo Maia, but the latter presented a letter in which he denied the statement and said that, in fact, he had requested the use of the National Public Security Force and not the Armed Forces. On 25 May, Temer revoked the previous day's decree and ended the use of the Armed Forces to guarantee law and order in the Federal District.

=== Intervention in Rio de Janeiro ===
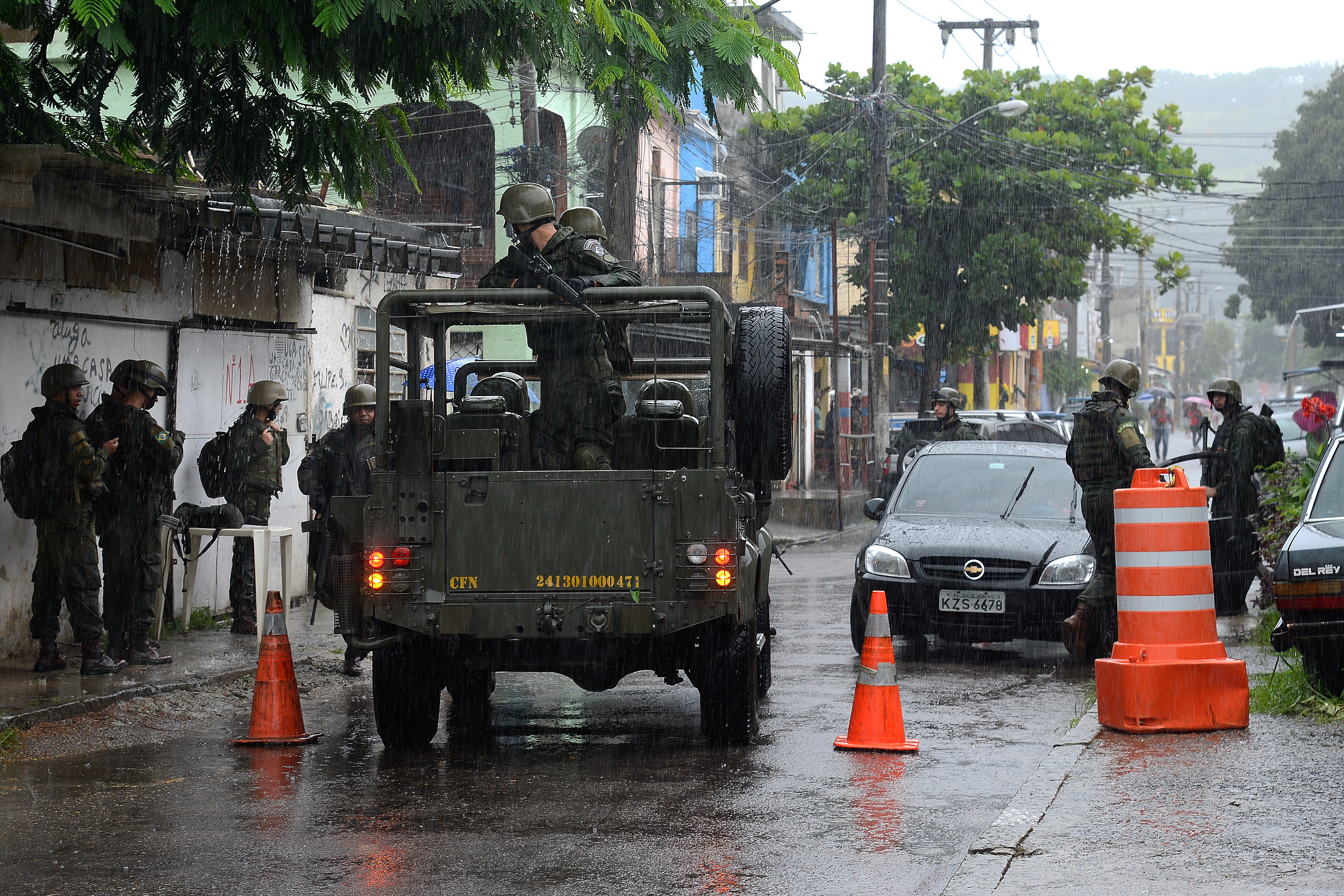
The Armed Forces conducted a joint operation with the Civil and Military Police in communities in the western zone of Rio de Janeiro during the Federal Intervention

On 16 February 2018, Temer signed a decree of federal intervention in public security in the state of Rio de Janeiro. Army General Walter Souza Braga Netto, of the Eastern Military Command, became the intervener in the state until 31 December 2018. His mission was to take charge of the Security Secretariat, the Civil and Military Police, the Fire Brigade and the state's prison system. Temer justified the measure on the grounds of the seriousness of the moment and the need to react firmly to defeat organized crime; the governor of Rio de Janeiro, Luiz Fernando Pezão, agreed with the procedure. General Netto said that he did not yet have an effective plan, but that it was being studied. According to the government, the decree did not mean any restriction of rights and guarantees or a threat to democracy. Braga Netto was subordinate to the president and could requisition, if necessary, "the financial, technological, structural and human resources of the state of Rio de Janeiro, related to the object and necessary to achieve the objective of the intervention".

=== SUS debts ===
In 2018, the federal budget reserve for public health was estimated at 130 billion reais. However, this is the second time in twenty years that the budget has not had a real increase to renovate public hospitals, buy new ambulances or take care of the population's preventive health. The amount set aside by the Ministry of Health for the Unified Health System (SUS) has not been fully implemented. The debt has risen sharply in recent years and was close to 20.9 billion reais by the end of 2017. Government practices have caused the debt to grow. In 2003, before the governments of Lula, Dilma and Michel Temer, the amount registered and reinscribed as unpaid debts was no more than 14.4 million reais; in 2017, it reached R$14.3 billion. The Ministry of Health has stated that the practice is not a problem.

=== Diesel crisis ===
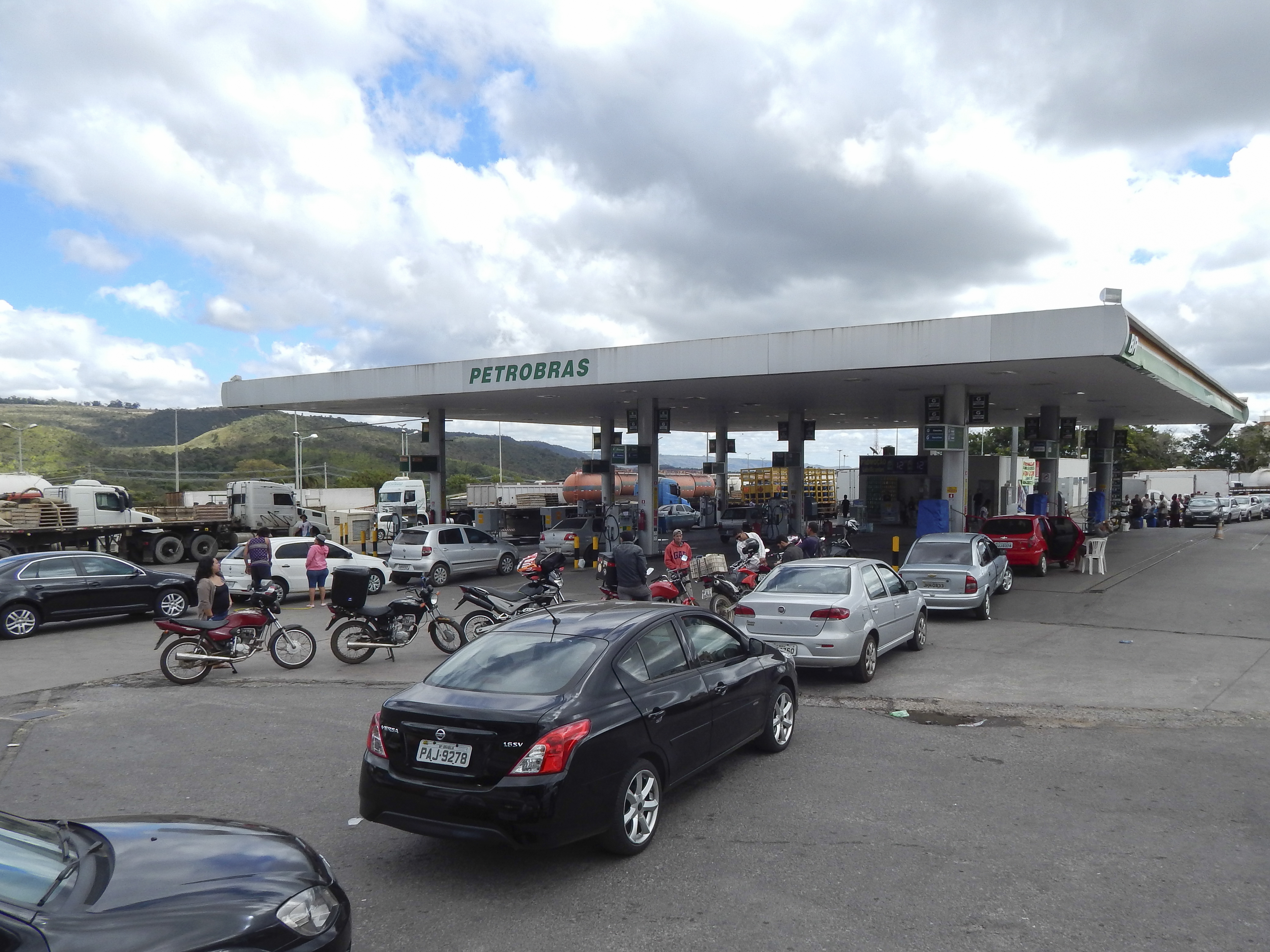
Drivers queue for gas as a result of the truckers' strike

At the end of May, truck drivers began a nationwide strike demanding a reduction in the price of diesel fuel. Although it began spontaneously on social networks, the movement was spearheaded by the National Confederation of Autonomous Transporters and unions in the category. According to the strikers, there were 53 protest points in 23 Brazilian states and in the Federal District. Many sectors of the economy were affected, such as gas stations, supermarkets, road transportation, airports and postal services. According to the hauliers' representatives, the current cost of oil was making it unviable to transport goods in the country. The organizations wanted the government to establish a rule for the readjustment of the product, which fluctuated according to the value of oil on the international market and the exchange rate of the dollar. Brazil was severely affected because it relies heavily on road transportation to transport goods, people and products, including raw materials and inputs such as fuel. Unlike other countries, the country has few rail lines to transport production.

On 25 May 2018, Temer's government decreed the Guarantee of Law and Order (GLO) to contain the truckers' strike in Brazil, after the previous day's agreement had no effect on the stoppage.

== Reactions ==
=== Popularity ratings ===
Temer's popularity has been low since he became president, and in different opinion polls, his rejection rate has surpassed that of Dilma Rousseff. The most recent surveys show that the government's popularity has been the lowest in history for a certain period.

=== Popular protests and demonstrations ===
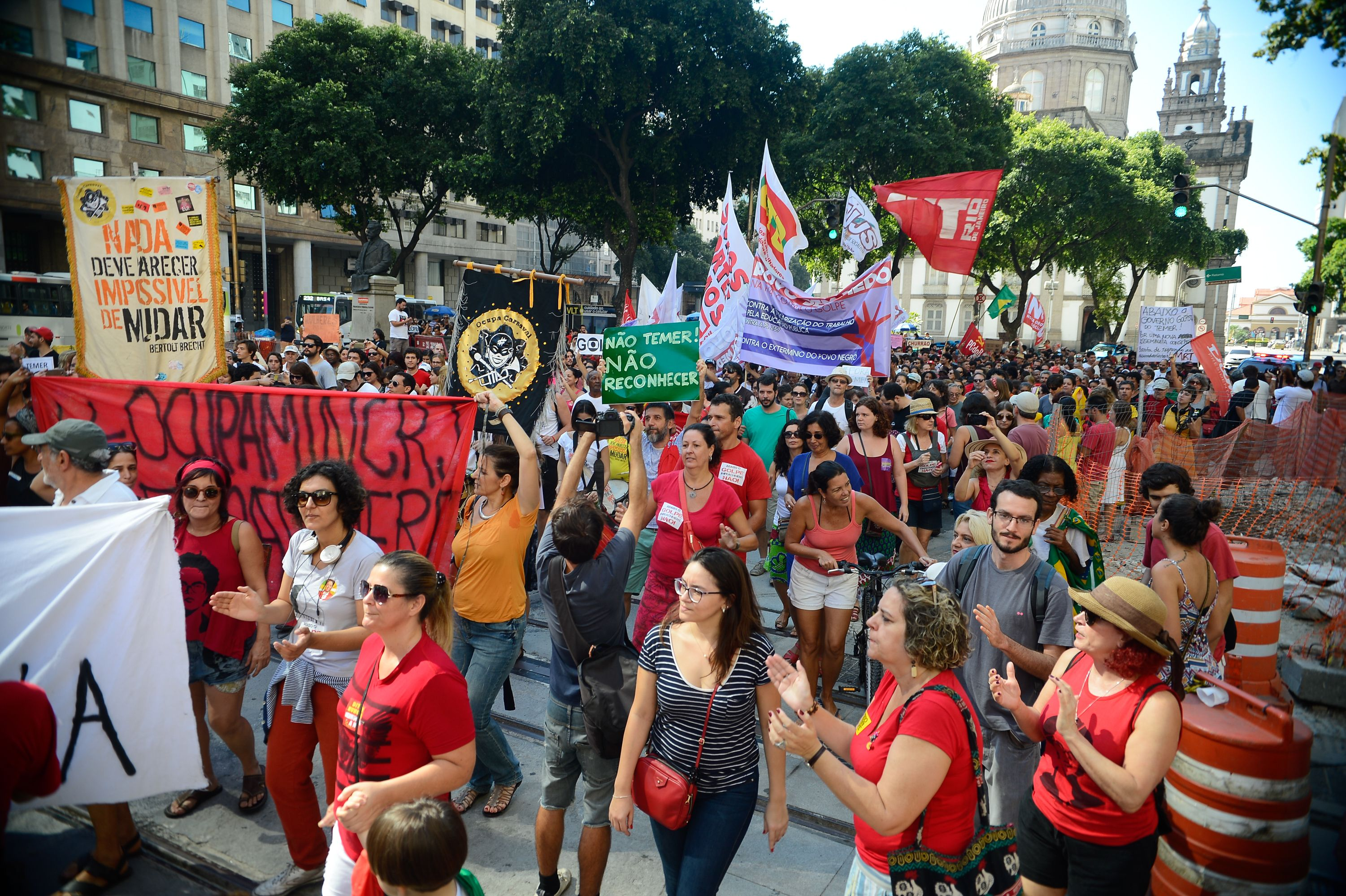
Different social movements protest against interim president Temer in central Rio de Janeiro

The Temer government has been the target of popular protests and demonstrations since its first days. The first interview for the programme Fantástico was received by the population with cacerolazos and whistles, as well as shouts of order such as "coup plotter", in various places around the country. On 17 May 2016, organizations such as the National Union of Students, the Popular Youth Uprising, the Socialist Youth Union and the Brazilian Women's Union led around 8,000 people to Paulista Avenue in São Paulo to call for Temer's ouster.

In reaction to the closure of the Ministry of Culture, activists from the sector occupied the Ministry's headquarters in several states in May 2016. Among others, the Gustavo Capanema Palace in Rio de Janeiro and the Funarte buildings in Belo Horizonte, Brasília and São Paulo were occupied. The activities were supported by artists such as Otto and Arnaldo Antunes, who played concerts at the Capanema Palace.

On 17 May, during the Cannes Film Festival in France, members of the Aquarius team, including director Kleber Mendonça Filho and actress Sônia Braga, displayed placards protesting against Dilma's impeachment. On her official Twitter account, Dilma thanked their support.

=== External reactions ===
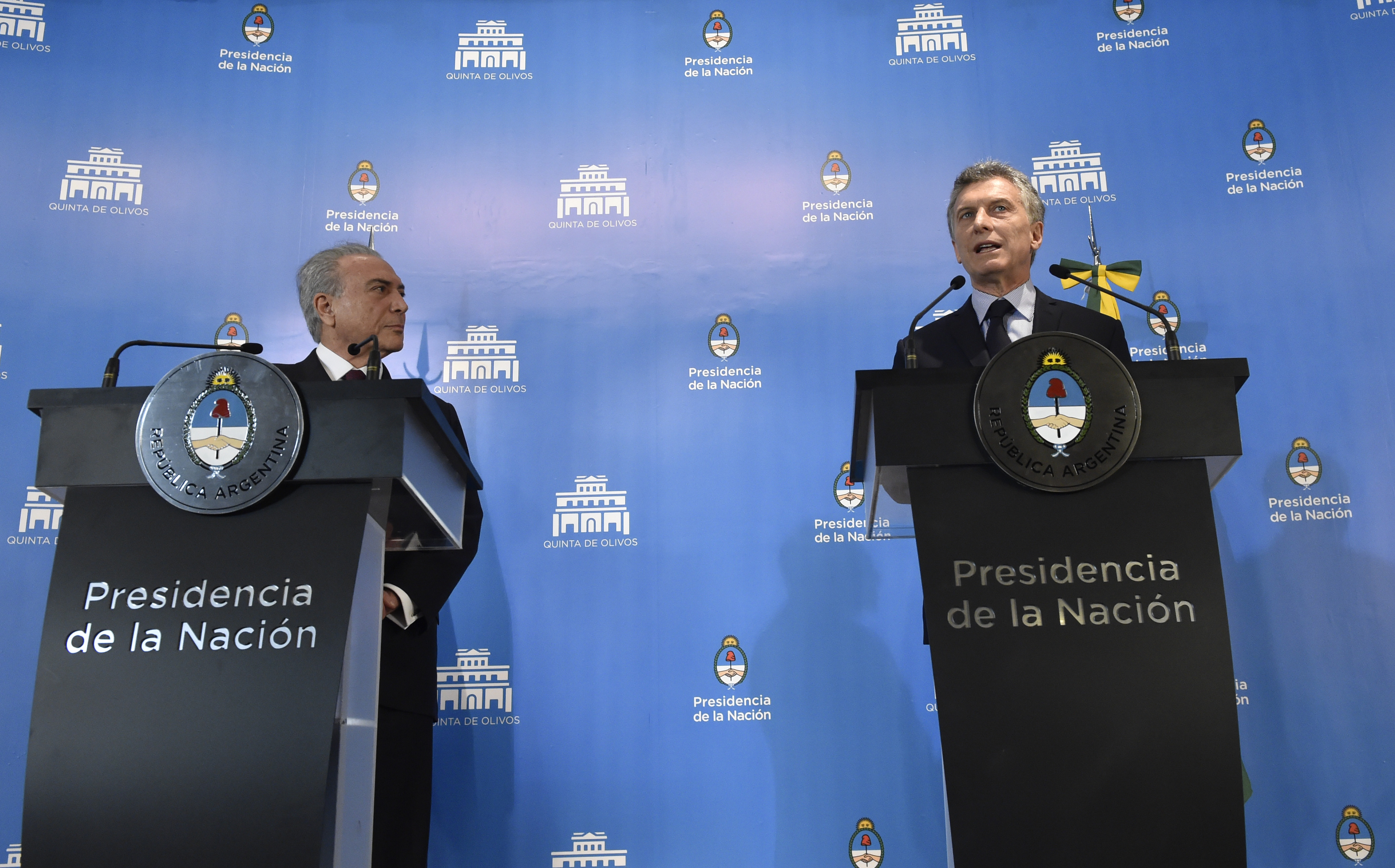
Temer with Argentine president Mauricio Macri at the Olivos Residence in Buenos Aires, 2016

The immediate aftermath of Rousseff's ouster had particular repercussions in Latin American countries. The start of the interim government first earned an official note from Argentina's foreign ministry, expressing respect for the "ongoing institutional process" and confidence in the "outcome of the situation". However, in contrast to President Macri's caution, leaders from Bolivia, Venezuela, Cuba, Ecuador, Bolivia, Nicaragua and El Salvador, as well as the Bolivarian Alliance for the Peoples of Our America – Peoples' Cooperation Treaty (ALBA/TCP), openly spoke out against what they called the "parliamentary coup" underway in Brazil.

At the same time, the secretary-general of the Union of South American Nations (Unasur), Ernesto Samper, said that the accusations against Dilma did not justify her removal, admitting that "we may have to consult the other countries of the bloc on whether or not to apply the democratic clause [of Unasur]". Foreign minister of the Temer administration criticized the governments of those countries for "spreading falsehoods about the internal political process in Brazil" and the statements made by the Unasur secretary.

During the following days, the governments of Chile and Uruguay announced that they did not intend to maintain contact with the interim government of Brazil. The Secretary General of the OAS, Luis Almagro, declared that he could take the Brazilian impeachment to the Inter-American Court of Human Rights, considering that the process was marked by "legal uncertainty". A group of members of the European Parliament called Rousseff's impeachment a white coup and asked the European Union to halt trade negotiations with Mercosur.

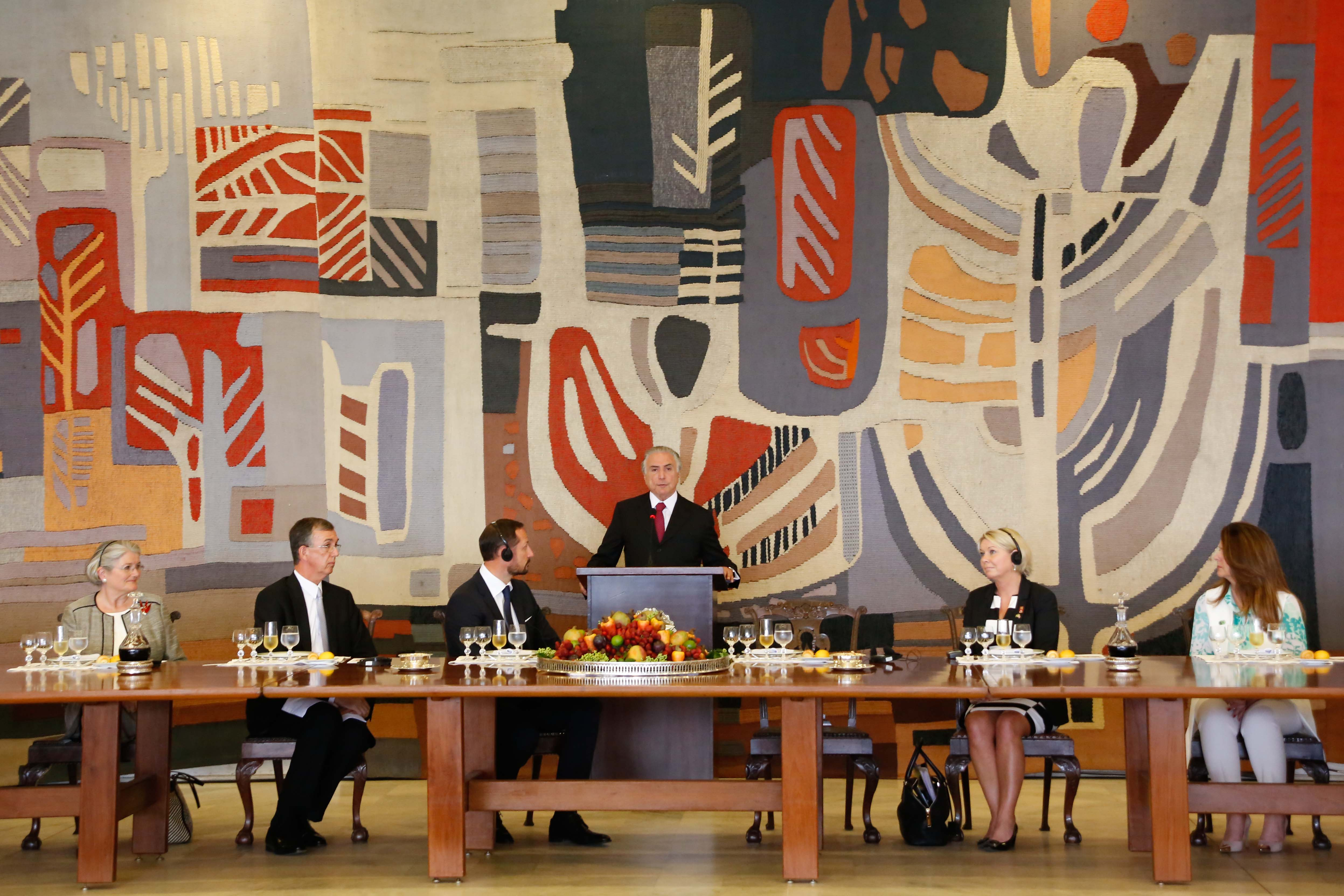
Temer receives the Crown Prince of Norway, Haakon Magnus, at Itamaraty, with the aim of expanding economic relations between the two countries

On 31 May, a group of members of the European Parliament called on the European Union to halt trade negotiations with Mercosur because of the ouster of President Rousseff. In a letter sent to the European Commission, they warned that the bloc would be negotiating with "a government without legitimacy". The initiative was led by political parties such as Spain's Podemos and Italy's Five Star Movement, and parliamentary groups such as the European United Left/Nordic Green Left and The Greens/European Free Alliance. Initially, 34 MEPs, out of 751 representatives in the European Parliament, signed the document, but the organizers were looking for new members. The MEPs classified the process in Brazil as a soft coup in the form of impeachment and wanted to include the political crisis in Brazil on the European Parliament's agenda, as was already being done with Venezuela.

Several news agencies reported that Michel Temer had created a cabinet composed entirely of white men to command one of the most ethnically diverse countries in the world and noted that it was the first cabinet without women in Brazil since 1979. On 13 June, the UN High Commissioner for Human Rights, Zeid bin Ra'ad, also warned of the lack of blacks in government, pointing out that there were more than 150 million people of African descent in Latin America and the Caribbean, accounting for almost 30% of the population, including more than half of Brazil's population and more than 10% of Cuba's population, although the representation of this segment in the upper echelons of government was still very small. Hussein said: "This deficit of representation at the top of power affects the whole of society: parliaments, workplaces in the public and private sector, schools, courts, the press, all places where the voices of Afro-descendants are given very little importance."

== Legacy ==
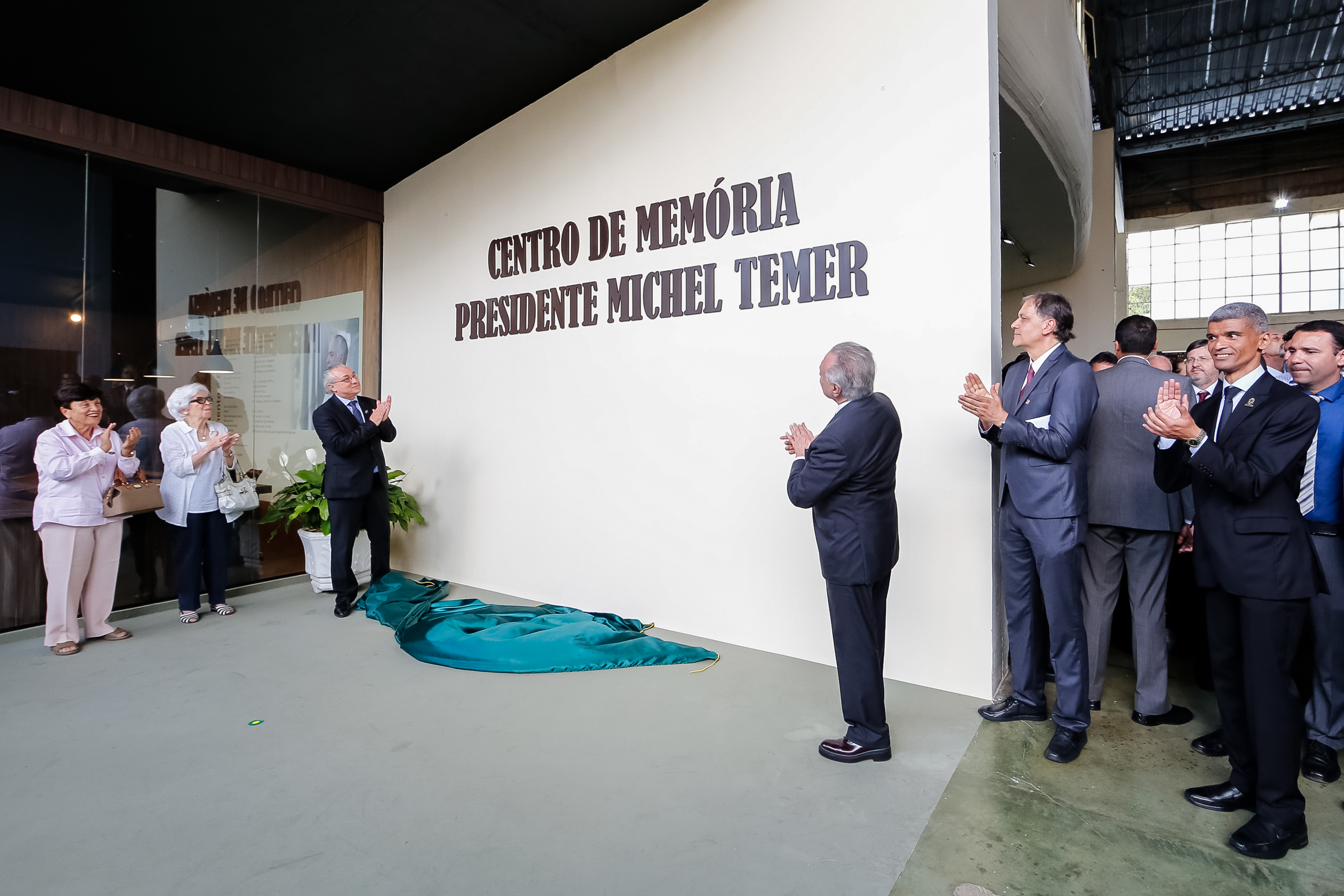
Inauguration of the President Michel Temer Memory Centre

According to an article in the Estadão newspaper, Temer left a positive legacy. Aware of the responsibility of balancing public accounts, he took tough political measures, such as approving the constitutional amendment that instituted a cap on federal spending, today one of the pillars of fiscal responsibility. In the words of the article, thanks to this measure, there is now a minimum of rationality in the management of public finances, bringing expenditure and income into line. In addition, Temer carried out the labour reform, which undid the legal constraints that turned employment contracts into a "mess of rules", to preserve solidified rights. This reform also forced unions to once again defend the interests of their members, who pay them monthly fees. However, Temer was unable to carry out the pension reform due to the corruption allegations, which drained his political support. Nonetheless, he was able to remedy the irresponsibility of public spending and restored the importance of political dialogues.

On the other hand, the measures adopted by Temer worsen the situation of industry in Brazil. It should be remembered that the country has been going through a long process of deindustrialization. In this way, these measures "consolidate Brazil's position in the world as a country that consumes industrial goods and does not have the capacity to produce [such goods] domestically".

=== President Michel Temer Memory Centre ===
At the end of his term, Temer inaugurated a memory centre about his time in office, located at the Itu Law School. The President Michel Temer Memory Centre (CMMT) has a collection of different items (museological, bibliographical, textual and iconographic) related to Brazil's recent history and to Temer.

== See also ==
- 2014 Brazilian economic crisis
- Presidency of Jair Bolsonaro
