= 2017 in Brazil =

Events in the year 2017 in Brazil.

== Incumbents ==
=== Federal government ===
- President: Michel Temer
- Vice president: Vacant

=== Governors ===
- Acre: Tião Viana
- Alagoas: Renan Filho
- Amapa: Waldez Góes
- Amazonas:
  - José Melo (until 9 May)
  - David Almeida (9 May-4 October)
  - Amazonino Mendes (from 4 October)
- Bahia: Rui Costa
- Ceará: Camilo Santana
- Espírito Santo: Paulo Hartung
- Goiás: Marconi Perillo
- Maranhão: Flávio Dino
- Mato Grosso: Pedro Taques
- Mato Grosso do Sul: Reinaldo Azambuja
- Minas Gerais: Fernando Damata Pimentel
- Pará: Simão Jatene
- Paraíba: Ricardo Coutinho
- Paraná: Beto Richa
- Pernambuco: Paulo Câmara
- Piauí: Wellington Dias
- Rio de Janeiro: Luiz Fernando Pezão
- Rio Grande do Norte: Robinson Faria
- Rio Grande do Sul: José Ivo Sartori
- Rondônia: Confúcio Moura
- Roraima: Suely Campos
- Santa Catarina: Raimundo Colombo
- São Paulo: Geraldo Alckmin
- Sergipe: Jackson Barreto
- Tocantins: Marcelo Miranda

=== Vice governors ===
- Acre: Maria Nazareth Melo de Araújo Lambert
- Alagoas: José Luciano Barbosa da Silva
- Amapá: João Bosco Papaléo Paes
- Amazonas:
  - José Henrique Oliveira (until 4 October)
  - João Bosco Gomes Saraiva (from 4 October)
- Bahia: João Leão
- Ceará: Maria Izolda Cela de Arruda Coelho
- Espírito Santo: César Roberto Colnago
- Goiás: José Eliton de Figueiredo Júnior
- Maranhão: Carlos Orleans Brandão Júnior
- Mato Grosso:
  - Carlos Henrique Baqueta Fávaro (until 5 April)
  - Vacant thereafter
- Mato Grosso do Sul: Rose Modesto
- Minas Gerais: Antônio Eustáquio Andrade Ferreira
- Pará: José da Cruz Marinho
- Paraíba: Lígia Feliciano
- Paraná:
  - Maria Aparecida Borghetti (until 6 April)
  - Vacant thereafter
- Pernambuco: Raul Jean Louis Henry Júnior
- Piaui: Margarete de Castro Coelho
- Rio de Janeiro: Francisco Dornelles
- Rio Grande do Norte: Fábio Dantas
- Rio Grande do Sul: José Paulo Dornelles Cairoli
- Rondônia: Daniel Pereira
- Roraima: Paulo César Justo Quartiero
- Santa Catarina: Eduardo Pinho Moreira
- São Paulo: Márcio França
- Sergipe: Belivaldo Chagas Silva
- Tocantins: Cláudia Telles de Menezes Pires Martins Lelis

== Events ==
=== January ===
- January 2: At least 56 people are killed in a prison riot in Manaus at the Anisio Jobim penitentiary complex in Amazonas.
- January 6: Members of the Primeiro Comando da Capital (PCC) prison gang kill 31 inmates at the Monte Cristo Agricultural Penitentiary in Roraima, in revenge for an earlier massacre in Amazonas that killed 56 inmates.
- January 13: Police raid multiple Rio de Janeiro locations in an investigation of Caixa Econômica Federal lending practices.
- January 15:
  - At least 10 inmates are killed in a prison riot between rival gangs in Natal.
  - Another 33 prisoners are killed in a fresh outbreak of violence at Alcacuz prison in Rio Grande do Norte.
- January 19: A small plane carrying Supreme Court Justice Teori Zavascki crashes into the sea near the tourist town of Paraty; killing the magistrate and four other people. Zavascki had been handling the politically-charged, Operation Car Wash corruption trials.
- January 21: Brazilian police enter the Alcacuz prison outside of Natal, Rio Grande do Norte after a week of fighting left 26 inmates dead. At least 126 people have been killed in Brazil's prisons since the beginning of the year.
- January 30: Brazilian police arrest EBX Group CEO Eike Batista for allegedly bribing officials in Rio de Janeiro, including former governor Sérgio Cabral Filho.

=== February ===
- February 2: STF Minister Edson Fachin is selected as the new rapporteur for Operation Lava Jato, after the death of Teori Zavascki.
- February 3: Espírito Santo experiences the biggest security crisis in the state.
- February 6: President Michel Temer deploys the Brazilian Army to the southeastern state of Espírito Santo, where a police strike leads to a wave of violence and looting, including dozens of murders in the state capital, Vitória.
- February 8: TRE-RJ determines the impeachment of the mandates of the Governor of Rio de Janeiro, Luiz Fernando Pezão and vice governor Francisco Dornelles.
- February 9: Supreme Court justice Edson Fachin authorizes an investigation into efforts to impede the Operation Car Wash kickback investigation. Prosecutor General Rodrigo Janot accuses former President and current Senator José Sarney, as well as Senators Romero Juca and Renan Calheiros of obstruction of justice, citing conversations secretly recorded by cooperating witness Sergio Machado, former president of Transpetro.

=== March ===
- March 7: Economic figures released show that the Brazilian economy shrank 3.6% in 2016.
- March 16: By using the fully expendable version of their Falcon 9 launch vehicle; SpaceX successfully launches the EchoStar 23 satellite, a direct-to-home television broadcast service for Brazil, into a geosynchronous transfer orbit.
- March 17:
  - Operation Carne Fraca begins, which investigates some of the largest meat processing companies in the country.
  - Share prices for meatpacker JBS S.A. drop 10%.
- March 25: China, Chile, and Egypt lift their bans on importing meat from Brazil.

=== April ===
- April 5: Former Secretary of Health of Rio de Janeiro Sérgio Côrtes is charged, along with two other people, with obstruction of justice for trying to get former under-secretary Cesar Romero to change his testimony in an Operation Car Wash investigation.
- April 11: STF Minister, Edson Fachin removes the secrecy of Odebrecht's accusations in the context of Operation Lava Jato.
- April 13: A former Odebrecht executive, jailed for bribery, says that Michel Temer was involved in a scheme to funnel a $40 million dollar illegal campaign contribution to his party's campaign fund. Temer denies this.
- April 17: A federal judge orders Petrobras to suspend the sale of its stake in an offshore prospect to Norway's Statoil. This is in response to the National Federation of Oil Workers petition, where there should have been an open bidding process for the transaction.
- April 25: Around 50 armed men allegedly belonging to the Brazil-based First Capital Command, storm a security vault and police headquarters in Ciudad del Este, Paraguay, escape with around $6 million in a daring cross-border raid.
- April 28:
  - A nationwide strike takes place against cuts to social security benefits and changes to labour laws by Michel Temer's government, including plans to raise the retirement age to 65. This is the first general strike in Brazil in twenty years.
  - Rocha Loures is filmed leaving a pizzeria with 500,000 reals in a carry-on he received from one of Joesley Batista's executives.
  - Eike Batista is released from prison, whilst pending trial, by Supreme Court justice Gilmar Mendes. Batista had been charged with making $16.5 million in bribes to the former governor of Rio de Janeiro.

=== May ===
- May 4: The Brazilian geostationary satellite SGDC-1 is launched at the Kourou base in French Guiana. It was carried out by Arianespace, which was launched by the Ariane 5 rocket.
- May 11: The federal government of Brazil informs the World Health Organization that it is ending its state of emergency concerning the Zika virus, following a 95.3% reduction in cases in early 2017 compared to early 2016.
- May 17: O Globo reports, that it has obtained recordings of President Michel Temer discussing a bribe for Eduardo Cunha. Cunha is imprisoned on a nine-year sentence for corruption, money laundering and tax evasion in return for not talking to prosecutors. Temer strongly denies the report.
- May 18: Police search the Rio de Janeiro apartment of Aécio Neves, who narrowly lost the 2014 presidential election to Dilma Rousseff in the second-round runoff. The Supreme Court, which has jurisdiction in criminal trials of sitting politicians, suspend Neves' senatorial status, due to his pending criminal trial. An Odebrecht executive seeking a lighter sentence on his own bribery charges, filmed Nueves discussing a payment of two million reals, roughly $638,000.
- May 19:
  - The Supreme Court releases a plea bargain testimony from JBS S.A., revealing that the company paid 500 million reais in bribes to politicians, including current President Michel Temer; his predecessors Dilma Rousseff and Luiz Inácio Lula da Silva; and former presidential candidates Aécio Neves and José Serra.
  - Protesters demand new elections after the release of an audio tape in which Temer appears to approve a hush money payment to Eduardo Cunha.
- May 24: Protestors set fire to the Ministry of Agriculture headquarters in Brasília, amid calls for the impeachment or resignation of Michel Temer as President of Brazil over allegations of corruption.

=== June ===
- June 1: The first increase in GDP after eight consecutive quarterly declines is registered. The country is recovering from the 2014 economic crisis.
- June 6: The Superior Electoral Court (TSE) reopens the illegal campaign funding case against President Michel Temer, the vice presidential candidate on former President Dilma Rousseff's ticket in 2014. Temer became president in August 2016 when Rousseff was impeached, and could be unseated if the court annuls the Rousseff–Temer election victory.
- June 7: TSE hears a motion on the admissibility of new allegations made in plea bargain testimony by construction company Odebrecht about illegal campaign contributions to the political ticket shared by then-president Dilma Rousseff and then-vice president Michel Temer, who replaced her after her impeachment.
- June 9: TSE votes 4–3 to reject the campaign finance case against Temer, which had also implicated Rousseff as his running mate.
- June 13: Former governor of Rio de Janeiro, Sergio Cabral Filho, is sentenced to 14 years and two months in prison for corruption and money laundering in a scheme involving kickbacks for construction contracts, such as a Rio petrochemical plant. Former Rio interior minister Wilson Carlos Carvalho, described as Cabral's right hand, is also found guilty and sentenced to ten years. Judge Sergio Moro said there wasn't enough evidence to convict Cabral's wife, Adriana Ancelmo.
- June 21:
  - Reports surface of a Temer administration plan to lift restrictions on foreign mining company operations within a 150-mile zone of the country's border.
  - DataPoder puts Temer approval rating at 2%.
- June 27:
  - President Michel Temer is charged with corruption by Prosecutor General Rodrigo Janot. The case eventually goes to the Supreme Federal Court.
  - A federal court upholds João Vaccari Neto's appeal of his 15-year sentence for bribery and money laundering.
- June 29: Ipsos Institute poll puts Temer disapproval rating at 93%.

=== July ===
- July 4: Temer's government introduces a legislative initiative described as labor reform.
- July 11: Temer signs MP 759 into law, making significant changes to Brazilian land and agrarian reform policies that environmentalists say threaten to worsen deforestation and a massive asset transfer to large landowners.
- July 12: Judge Sergio Moro sentences former Brazilian president Luiz Inácio Lula da Silva to nine and a half years in prison, albeit remaining free on appeal. Lula is found guilty on corruption and money laundering charges in connection with the Petrobras investigation. He is the first president of Brazil to be criminally convicted since the enactment of the 1988 Constitution.
- July 25: Temer appoints Sérgio Sá Leitão as Minister of Culture.
- July 27: Transparency NGO Contas Abertas (Open Accounts) said Temer spent 4.2 billion reals ($1.33 billion) since June, compared to 100 million reals in January through May, in advance of a vote in the lower house on corruption charges that could remove him from office.

=== August ===
- August 2: The Chamber of Deputies bars accusations of passive corruption against President Michel Temer.
- August 3: In association football, Paris Saint-Germain sign Neymar from FC Barcelona for a world-record transfer fee of €222 million (£200 million, US$264 million).
- August 6: Police and soldiers raid five poor suburbs of Rio de Janeiro looking for those responsible for a string of truck hijackings.
- August 11:
  - Sérgio Côrtes, former Secretary of Health of Rio de Janeiro, states in court that $3 million US had been deposited for his use in a Swiss bank account in connection with an overbilling scheme involving prosthesis at a Rio trauma center.
  - Petrobras discovers "oil accumulation in the Campos basin's pre-salt layer, in the area of Marlim Sul field."
- August 16: Justice Minister Torquato Jardim stated at a conference that Brazil's informal economy accounted for 16% of its gross domestic product.
- August 21: Temer administration announces plans to privatize Eletrobras, the Petrobras subsidiary that produces 40% of Brazil's electricity.
- August 22: The passenger ship Comandante Ribeiro sinks in the Xingu River near Porto de Moz, where at least ten people lost their lives.
- August 23: News emerges that Michel Temer has abolished the protected status of a huge piece of land in the remote northern Amazon known as the National Reserve of Copper and Associates (Renca).
- August 25: President Michel Temer abolishes the 46,000 km^{2} National Reserve of Copper and Associates (Renca) ecological reserve, which spans the borders of Amapá and Pará in northern Brazil. More than 20 domestic and multinational firms have expressed interest in accessing the area's deposits of gold, copper, tantalum, iron ore, nickel and manganese.
- August 29: An injunction is issued against the revocation of Renca, stating that Michel Temer has exceeded his authority and that the area's ecological protections can only be undertaken by the legislative branch.

=== September ===
- September 5: - The Federal Police makes the biggest seizure of cash in the nation's history, during a search and seizure in Operation Lost Treasure.
- September 6: Prosecutors file corruption charges in connection with Operation Carwash against ex-presidents Dilma Rousseff and Luiz Inácio Lula da Silva. This is the first time allegations had been made against Rousseff, whereas Lula has previously been charged in connection with a beach house that prosecutors say was a bribe.
- September 8: Prosecutor Rodrigo Janot files charges in the Supreme Court against officials in President Michel Temer's Brazilian Democratic Movement Party accusing them of forming a criminal organization.
- September 10: Fundação Nacional do Índio (Funai), the Brazilian agency for indigenous people, report that a group of miners had boasted of killing as many as ten members of an uncontacted tribe.
- September 11:
  - Authorities investigate the reported murder of ten members of an Amazonian tribe in the Javari Valley.
  - Brazilian prosecutors announce a joint investigation with Venezuela, regarding a scheme in which the Venezuelan government agency PDVSA overpaid for agricultural equipment from Brazil's America Trading by $64 million. Investigators say that most of the payments wound up in accounts in Panama, Switzerland and the United States.
- September 15: Additional corruption charges are filed against Michel Temer in relation to illegal campaign contributions from JBS S.A.
- September 16: Brazil imposes a 20% tariff on imports of US ethanol.
- September 28: Brazil auctions oil leases, raising more than one billion dollars.

=== October ===
- October 4: Brazilian police detain Italian fugitive Cesare Battisti, after he was attempting to flee across the border into Bolivia, in order to avoid extradition back to Italy. If extradited, he faces a life sentence in prison for four murders he committed during the 1970s.
- October 5 – In the town of Janaúba, Minas Gerais state, a recently dismissed security guard set fire to a childcare center killing ten children and three teachers, and leaving, mostly children aged four and five, injured.
- October 18: The Tribunal de Contas da União (Federal Accounting Court) said Brazilian Development Bank (BNDES) paid 20% too much for the shares it bought of JBS S.A., from Joesley and Wesley Batista, causing an $89 million loss.
- October 26 – Brazil's Chamber of Deputies voted 233–251 on a motion to approve impeachment proceedings against President Michel Temer. The motion required a two-thirds majority (342 votes) to proceed. Brazilian law requires Chamber of Deputies approval of a Supreme Court trial; criminal charges cannot be brought against a sitting president under Brazilian law.
- October 27: Brazil auctions offshore oil leases to ExxonMobil, Statoil and Shell.

=== November ===
- November 8: Commission approves a bill restricting abortion, even in cases of rape.
- November 12: The Brazilian Grand Prix takes place at the Autódromo José Carlos Pace in the Interlagos neighborhood of São Paulo. It is the final home race for Felipe Massa and is won by Sebastian Vettel.
- November 21: Temer signs immigration bill into law.
- November 30: The Supreme Court upholds a national ban on the use of asbestos.

=== December ===
- December 6: Alleged drug lord Rogério da Silva, known as Rogério 157, is arrested in Rocinha, in an operation involving 3,000 members of the Brazilian military and police forces.
- December 9: The Brazilian Social Democracy Party (PSDB) selects Geraldo Alckmin as its presidential candidate in the upcoming 2018 general election.
- December 12: Charges are filed in the 10th Federal Court in Brasília against Rodrigo Santos da Rocha Loures, after accepting a bribe as an aide to Michel Temer. Loures was filmed leaving a São Paulo pizzeria with a bag containing 500,000 reis which was, according to prosecutors, supposed to be a down payment on a R38 million project, to be paid over nine months. Temer was charged as well, but the Chamber of Deputies voted against allowing the Supreme Court to try the charge. A prosecution of Temer on that charge thereupon cannot proceed until he leaves office. This filing represents a move forward in a criminal case against Rocha Lourdes.
- December 15: Ecudadorean Vice President Jorge Glas is sentenced to six years in prison for taking $13.5 million from Brazilian conglomerate Odebrecht.
- December 19: Marcelo Odebrecht is released from prison after two and a half years. Seven years of his reduced sentence remain, but he's been greenlighted to serve the remainder of his sentence at his luxury home in São Paulo. Originally sentenced to 9 years, Odebrecht's sentence is reduced in return for his cooperation in Operation Car Wash.
- December 21: Relations between Brazil and Guyana are intensified after a new cooperation agreement between the countries.
- December 28: Supreme Court chief justice Cármen Lúcia upholds the appeal of chief prosecutor Raquel Dodge against Temer's Christmas pardon, which he expanded to cover first offenders with convictions for non-violent crimes who served at least one fifth of their sentence. Corncerns have been expressed that the change was intendeded to benefit politicians convicted under the Operation Car Wash investigation.

== Arts and culture ==
- 2016–17 Brazil network television schedule
- List of Brazilian films of 2017

== Sports ==
- 2017 in Brazilian football

== Deaths ==
=== January ===
- January 3: Vida Alves, 88, actress, multiple organ failure.
- January 19:
  - Loalwa Braz, 63, singer-songwriter ("Lambada").
  - Teori Zavascki, 68, Supreme Court judge, Operação Lava Jato reporter, plane crash.
- January 20: Carlos Alberto Silva, 77, football manager (Guarani, Porto, Corinthians, Deportivo La Coruña, Brazil national football team).

=== February ===
- February 1: Albano Bortoletto Cavallin, 86, Roman Catholic prelate, Bishop of Guarapuava (1986–1992) and Archbishop of Londrina (1992–2006), surgical complications.
- February 3: Marisa Letícia Lula da Silva, 66, trade unionist, First Lady (2003–2010), stroke.
- February 11: Fab Melo, 26, professional basketball player (Boston Celtics).
- February 13: Paulo Henrique Filho, 52, footballer.
- February 28: Antônio Ribeiro de Oliveira, 90, Roman Catholic prelate, Bishop of Ipameri (1975–1985) and Archbishop of Goiânia (1985–2002).

=== March ===
- March 25: Marcelo Pinto Carvalheira, 88, Roman Catholic prelate, Bishop of Guarabira (1981–1989), Archbishop of Paraíba (1995–2004).
- March 29: João Gilberto Noll, 70, writer.

=== April ===
- April 4: Clóvis Frainer, 86, Roman Catholic prelate, Archbishop of Manaus (1985–1991) and Juiz de Fora (1991–2001).
- April 6:
  - Bona Medeiros, 86, Governor of Piauí (1986–1987).
  - Newton Holanda Gurgel, 93, Roman Catholic prelate, Bishop of Crato (1993–2001).
- April 23: Jerry Adriani, 70, singer and actor, cancer.
- April 30: Belchior, 70, singer and composer.

=== May ===
- May 2: Eduardo Portella, 84, essayist, author and politician, Minister of Education (1979–1980).
- May 5: Almir Guineto, 70, sambista, kidney disease and diabetes.
- May 7: Elon Lages Lima, 87, mathematician.
- May 10: Nelson Xavier, 75, actor (The Guns, A Queda), lung disease.
- May 12: Antonio Candido, 98, literary critic and sociologist.
- May 19: Kid Vinil, 62, musician and record producer.

=== June ===
- June 12: Pessalli, 26, footballer (Grêmio, Angers, Paraná), traffic collision.
- June 13: José Odon Maia Alencar, 88, Governor of Piauí (1966), Mayor of Pio IX (1959–1962).
- June 15: Wilma de Faria, 72, governor of Rio Grande do Norte (2003–2010), cancer.
- June 16: Eliza Clívia, 37, singer, traffic collision.
- June 27: João Oneres Marchiori, 84, Roman Catholic prelate, Bishop of Caçador (1977–1983) and Lages (1987–2009).

=== July ===
- July 3: Ângelo Angelin, 82, Governor of Rondônia (1985–1987).
- July 4: Maria d'Apparecida, 91, opera singer.
- July 7: Johnson Kendrick, 25, footballer (Al-Gharafa), shot.
- July 10: Elvira Vigna, 69, writer, cancer.
- July 20: Marco Aurélio Garcia, 76, politician, heart attack.
- July 23: Waldir Peres, 66, footballer (São Paulo, national team), world championship bronze medalist (1978), heart attack.
- July 24: Domingo Alzugaray, 84, Argentine-born Brazilian actor and journalist, founder of ISTOÉ, complications of Alzheimer's disease.
- July 26: Maxlei dos Santos Luzia, 42, footballer (Botafogo, AA Portuguesa, Vila Nova), cerebral edema.
- July 27: Perivaldo Dantas, 64, footballer (national team, Botafogo, São Paulo Futebol Clube), pneumonia.
- July 29: José Osvaldo de Meira Penna, 100, diplomat and writer.

=== August ===
- August 4: Luiz Melodia, 66, actor, singer and songwriter, bone marrow cancer.
- August 5: Ralph Biasi, 69, Mayor of Americana (1973–1977) and Minister for Science and Technology (1988–1989).
- August 11: Luiz Vicente Bernetti, 83, Italian-born Brazilian Roman Catholic prelate, Bishop of Apucarana (2005–2009).
- August 17: Paulo Silvino, 78, actor and humorist (A Praça É Nossa, Zorra Total), stomach cancer.
- August 22: Pedro Pedrossian, 89, Governor of Mato Grosso (1966–1971) and Mato Grosso do Sul (1980–1983, 1991–1995).
- August 26: Wilson das Neves, 81, percussionist and singer, cancer.
- August 27: José Maria Pires, 98, Roman Catholic prelate, Bishop of Araçuaí (1957–1965) and Archbishop of Paraíba (1965–1995), pneumonia.

=== September ===
- September 4: Rogéria, 74, actress and drag queen, septic shock.
- September 15: Izidoro Kosinski, 85, Roman Catholic prelate, Bishop of Três Lagoas (1981–2009).
- September 16: Marcelo Rezende, 65, journalist and television presenter, complications from pancreatic and liver cancer.
- September 17: Laudir de Oliveira, 77, percussionist (Sérgio Mendes, Marcos Valle, Chicago) and producer.
- September 22: Elizete da Silva, 46, heptathlete, South American champion (2001, 2005, 2006), traffic collision.

=== October ===
- October 5:
  - Heley de Abreu Silva Batista, 43, teacher (Janaúba Tragedy), burns.
  - Ruth Escobar, 81, Portuguese-born Brazilian actress (The Jew) and politician, founder of Teatro Ruth Escobar.
- October 8: Michel Fernando Costa, 36, footballer (SK Slavia Prague), leukemia.
- October 11: Nélio José Nicolai, 77, electrotechnician, inventor of Caller ID.
- October 22:
  - Ângela Lago, 71, writer and illustrator.
  - Geraldo João Paulo Roger Verdier, 80, French-born Brazilian Roman Catholic prelate, Bishop of Guajará-Mirim (1980–2011), hemorrhagic stroke.

=== November ===
- November 4: Tallys, 30, footballer (Paysandu), traffic collision.
- November 5: Dionatan Teixeira, 25, Brazilian-born Slovak footballer (Košice, Stoke City), heart attack.
- November 7: Amelia Toledo, 90, sculptor and painter.
- November 10:
  - Moniz Bandeira, 81, political scientist, historian and poet.
  - Márcia Cabrita, 53, actress (Sai de Baixo, Sete Pecados, Novo Mundo), ovarian cancer.
- November 15: Frans Krajcberg, 96, Polish-born Brazilian artist.
- November 26: José Doth de Oliveira, 79, Roman Catholic prelate, Bishop of Iguatu (2000–2009), complications from Alzheimer's disease.

=== December ===
- December 5: Victor Fontana, 101, Vice-Governor of Santa Catarina (1983–1987).
- December 8: Ocimar Versolato, 56, fashion designer, aneurysm following a stroke.
- December 10: Eva Todor, 98, Hungarian-born Brazilian actress, pneumonia.
- December 21:
  - Francelino Pereira, 96, Senator (1995–2003), Governor of Minas Gerais (1979–1983), and Deputy (1963–1979).
  - Renan Martins Pereira, 20, footballer (Avaí), brain cancer.

== See also ==
- 2017 in Brazilian football
- 2018 in Brazil
- 2016 in Brazil
- Operation Car Wash
- Petrobras
- Odebrecht
- 2015 protests in Brazil
- Ficha Limpa
