= O Judeu =

O Judeu may refer to:

- "The Jew", Portuguese writer António José da Silva
- O Judeu, 1866 novel by Camilo Castelo Branco about da Silva
- The Jew (film) 1995 historical film about da Silva
