= Accusations against Michel Temer by the Attorney General's Office =

Brazilian legal affair

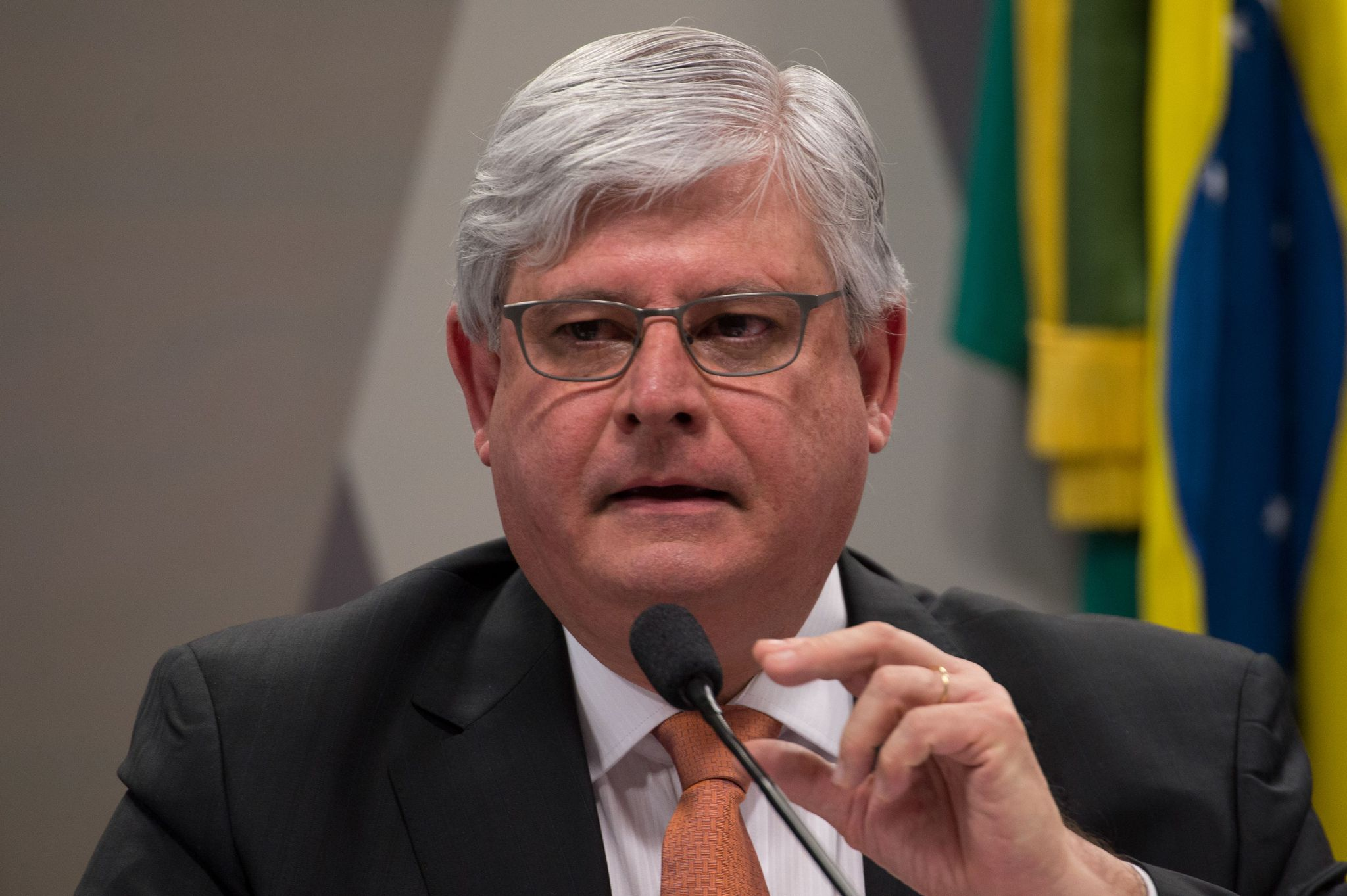
Rodrigo Janot filed two accusations against Temer in the Brazilian Chamber of Deputies.

The accusations against Michel Temer by the Office of the Prosecutor General of Brazil consisted of two accusations for common crimes filed by the Prosecutor General of Brazil, Rodrigo Janot, against the President of the Republic, Michel Temer, based on the crimes of passive corruption, criminal organization, and obstruction of justice, within the scope of Operation Car Wash.

The second and main accusation, presented on September 14, 2017, was primarily based on the plea bargains of executives from the company JBS and the stockbroker Lúcio Funaro. The accused of criminal organization were the politicians Eduardo Cunha, Rodrigo Rocha Loures, Henrique Alves, Geddel Vieira Lima, Eliseu Padilha, and Moreira Franco, all from the PMDB. The JBS executives Joesley Batista and Ricardo Saud were also accused of obstruction of justice. According to the second accusation, the seven PMDB members committed illicit acts in exchange for bribes within various public bodies and entities, including Petrobras, Furnas, Caixa Econômica Federal, and the Chamber of Deputies. Regarding Temer, he was identified by the Office of the Prosecutor General in the accusation as the leader of the criminal organization since May 2016. The first accusation, presented in August 2017, dealt with suspicions that former federal deputy Rodrigo Rocha Loures had negotiated and received bribes on behalf and for the benefit of Temer.

The Temer administration was successful in blocking both accusations in the Brazilian Chamber of Deputies, but under the accusation of political favoritism and buying the votes of deputies through parliamentary amendments and the distribution of positions, projects, measures, and other benefits. In addition, the accusations resulted in the loss of support from the government's base in the Chamber of Deputies throughout the votes.

== Political context ==
Since assuming the presidency after the removal of Dilma Rousseff, Temer has faced a succession of political crises caused by the involvement of members of his government in corruption allegations. Some of the president's key political advisers had to resign.

The first political crisis of the government began less than two weeks after Temer assumed the presidency, with the leaks of the plea bargain by former senator Sérgio Machado, which led to the dismissal of three ministers: Romero Jucá (Ministry of Planning), Fabiano Silveira (Ministry of Transparency), and Henrique Eduardo Alves (Ministry of Tourism).

Also in 2016, the Minister of Culture Marcelo Calero resigned and accused Minister Geddel Vieira Lima from the Secretariat of Government of pressuring him to reconsider a decision by the National Institute of Historic and Artistic Heritage (IPHAN) that prevented the construction of a real estate development where the Minister of the Secretariat of Government had purchased an apartment. The President kept Geddel in office despite the criticism, but the situation created a scandal that escalated, causing embarrassment for Temer. Geddel eventually resigned from the government.

Later came the political scandal generated by the plea bargains of executives and former officials of Odebrecht. Based on these plea bargains, Minister Luiz Edson Fachin, the rapporteur of Operation Car Wash at the Supreme Federal Court, authorized the opening of investigations to probe politicians mentioned in the testimonies, including eight ministers of the Temer government.

Temer himself was mentioned in the plea bargains, where he allegedly attended two meetings with the Odebrecht informants to arrange bribes. In addition to the Odebrecht plea bargains, Temer also appears in the plea bargains of lobbyists Júlio Camargo and Fernando Baiano, Sérgio Machado, and the expelled senator Delcídio do Amaral. However, none of these plea bargains could be investigated as Temer enjoys "temporary immunity": the President of the Republic cannot be the target of investigations for events that occurred outside his term of office.

=== JBS Testimonies ===
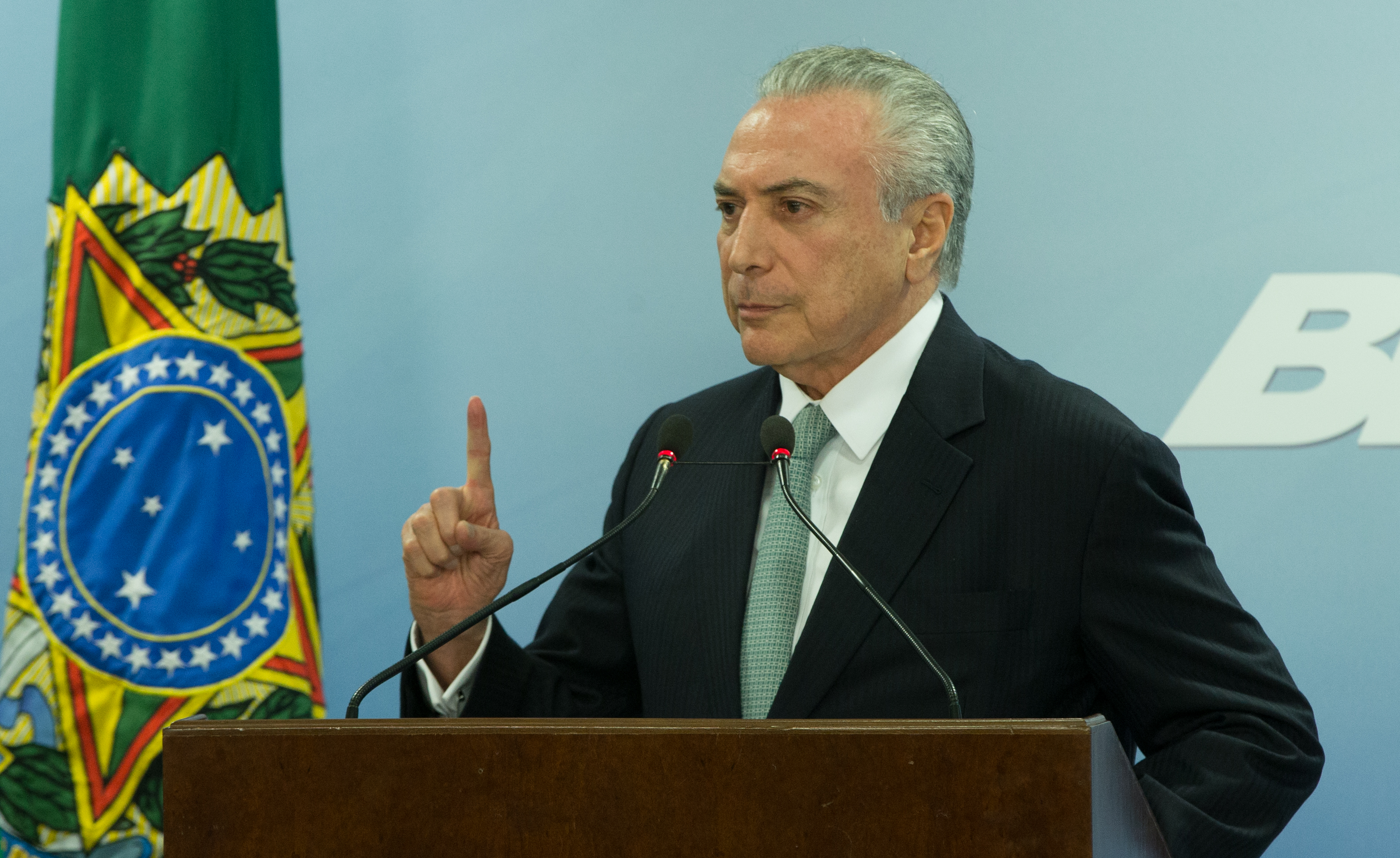
President Michel Temer during a statement after the disclosure of the JBS testimonies, emphasizing that he would not resign from office.

However, the JBS testimonies brought suspicious facts from the period in which he was already in office. The day after the disclosure of the JBS testimonies, the Federal Police launches Operation Patmos and the Temer government enters its biggest crisis. The president was forced to make a statement affirming that he would not resign from office. At the same time, Minister Edson Fachin, the rapporteur of Operation Car Wash at the Supreme Federal Court, authorizes the opening of an inquiry to investigate President Michel Temer.

== Process ==
In general, the impeachment and criminal indictment processes follow similar rules, but the procedure adopted in an indictment presents some differences. In an impeachment, the process is political and takes place in the National Congress, without going through the judiciary at any time. The rules of this process are based on Law No. 1,079 of 1950, which deals with crime of responsibility and, unlike ordinary crimes, can be denounced by any citizen. The request is forwarded to the Chamber of Deputies, and the admissibility of an impeachment process depends on the President of the Chamber. If approved, the lawmakers decide whether there is merit in the process through a vote in the plenary. Subsequently, the accusation goes to the Federal Senate, where the trial takes place. In case of conviction, a political punishment is applied, such as the loss of mandate and the revocation of political rights.

In the case of an indictment for common crimes, the process runs in the judicial sphere. The accusation is made by the Federal Public Prosecutor's Office, which investigates the case with the Federal Police and forwards the indictment to the Supreme Federal Court. The Supreme Court needs authorization from the Chamber of Deputies to proceed with the process against the president. The step-by-step process of indicting a president of the Republic is as follows:

- Firstly, the Prosecutor General of the Republic presents the indictment to the Supreme Federal Court;
- subsequently, the Supreme Federal Court requests authorization from the Chamber of Deputies to open the indictment;
- The indictment goes to the Committee on Constitution and Justice (CCJ), where the first stage of the proceedings against the president in the Chamber of Deputies begins. The committee is composed of 66 parliamentarians, among whom a rapporteur is chosen to prepare a report in favor or against the president;
- After the regulatory period of ten plenary sessions for the presentation of a defense, five additional sessions are held for the report to be voted on in the CCJ;
- The Committee votes on the rapporteur's report. Even if the report is in favor of the president or rejected, the indictment must go to the plenary of the Chamber;
- The Chamber of Deputies votes on the indictment in plenary. Just like in the impeachment process, a majority of 2/3 of the 513 deputies is required, that is, 342 deputies for the process to proceed;
- If approved, the indictment returns to the Supreme Federal Court, which decides whether to initiate an action against the president or not;
  - If the indictment were accepted, Temer would become a defendant and would be suspended from office for up to 180 days, with the interim assumption of the President of the Chamber of Deputies, Rodrigo Maia. Even if the 180-day deadline is exceeded, the trial would continue in the Supreme Court; the Court would then decide whether or not to remove the president from office.

However, with the rejection by the Chamber of Deputies, the indictment remains pending in the Supreme Court, and the case can only be resumed when Temer leaves the presidency. At that point, he would lose his privileged jurisdiction and a first-instance judge could analyze the indictment, without the need for authorization from an external body for the Judiciary to accept it and open a process.

== First indictment ==
Accusations against Michel Temer by the Attorney General's Office
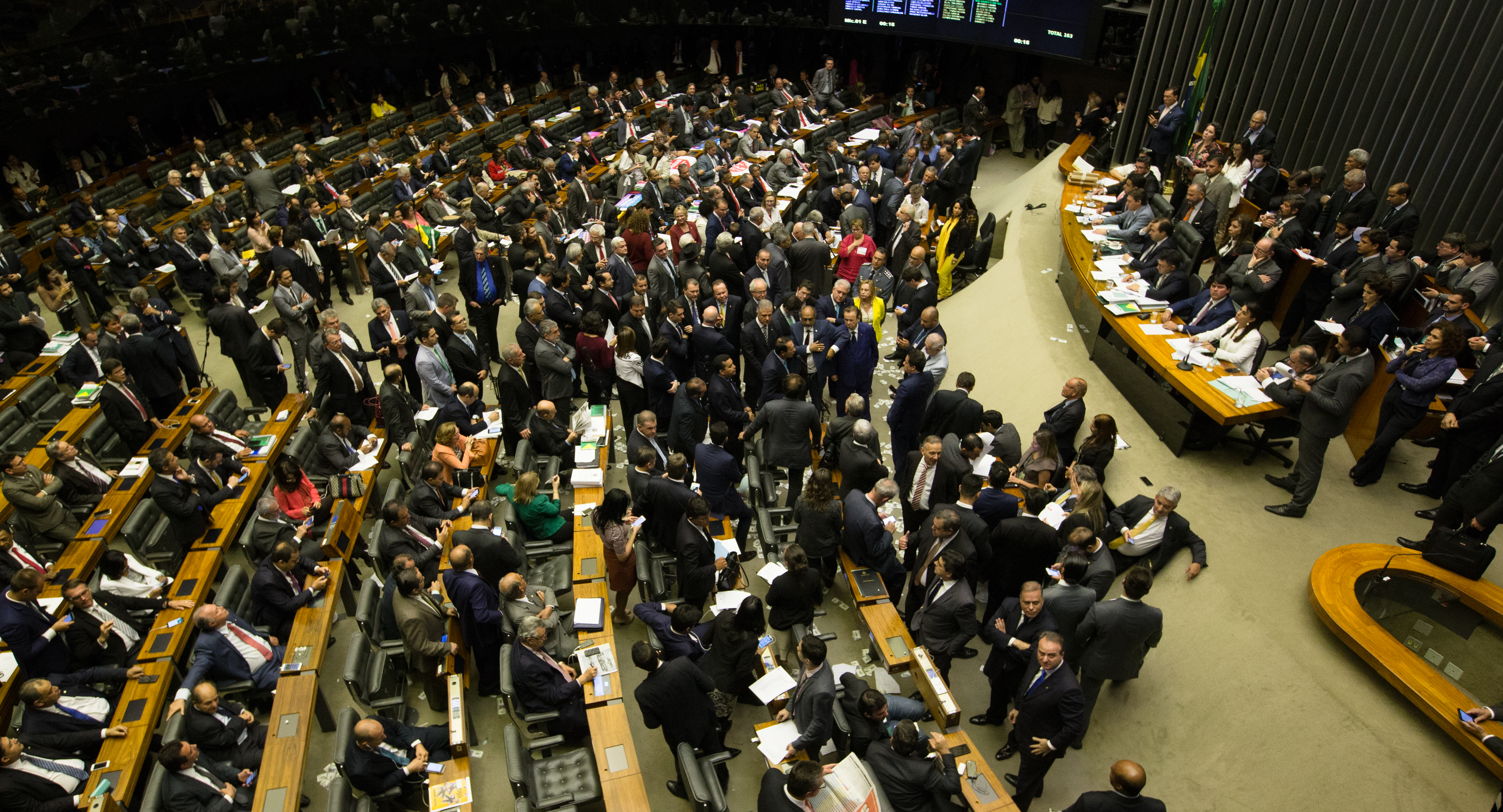
- Chamber plenary during the first voting of the first indictment against president Temer.
- Accused: Michel Temer, President of Brazil
- Proponents: Rodrigo Janot, Prosecutor General
- Date: 26 June 2017 – 2 August 2017; 1 month and 1 week
- Outcome: Complaint archived
- Charges: Passive corruption

Congressional votes

First voting in the Chamber of Deputies Constitution and Justice Commission
- Accusation: Vote to accept the complaint
- Votes in favor: 25
- Votes against: 40
- Result: Report rejected; new rapporteur chosen

Second voting in the Chamber of Deputies Constitution and Justice Commission
- Accusation: Vote to reject the complaint
- Votes in favor: 41
- Votes against: 24
- Result: Report accepted

Voting in the Chamber of Deputies
- Accusation: Vote to reject the complaint
- Votes in favor: 263
- Votes against: 227
- Present: 2
- Not voting: 19
- Result: Complaint archived

The indictment process began on June 26, after it was filed with the Supreme Federal Court, to the case's rapporteur, Edson Fachin. The accusation was based on investigations opened within the Operation Car Wash, based on the testimonies of executives from the company JBS. Janot's report accused Temer of being the final recipient of a suitcase containing five hundred thousand reais and a promise of another 38 million reais in undue advantage, both from the company JBS. According to the indictment, the intermediary in the operations was the president's former aide and former deputy, Rodrigo Rocha Loures, who was arrested on May 18 and filmed in March 2017 by the Federal Police of Brazil, running out of a restaurant in São Paulo with a suitcase containing five hundred thousand reais. According to the Prosecutor General's Office, the money was part of a bribe intended for Temer in exchange for his help to JBS in processes at the Administrative Council for Economic Defense (Cade). As a result, the president was accused of the crime of passive corruption. This was the first time a president of the Republic had been indicted before the Supreme Court while in office. Janot also requested that Temer be sentenced to removal from the office of president and pay a fine of ten million reais for moral damages to the community. Former deputy Rocha Loures would pay a fine of two million reais.

=== Processing in the Chamber of Deputies ===
On July 5, the president of the Constitution and Justice Committee, Rodrigo Pacheco (PMDB-MG), appointed Sergio Zveiter (PMDB-RJ) as the rapporteur of the case. Despite being affiliated with PMDB, Zveiter had a technical and independent profile and presented a favorable opinion regarding the admissibility of the accusation.

While the accusation was under analysis in the Constitution and Justice Committee, the government engaged in a series of maneuvers with allied parties, such as replacing members considered insufficiently loyal, as well as releasing funds for projects and amendments by lawmakers, among other strategies, to ensure the rejection of the rapporteur's opinion by Sergio Zveiter, who recommended the continuation of the accusation. Thus, on July 13, the committee members rejected Sergio Zveiter's report by 40 votes to 25. With the rejection of Zveiter's opinion, the committee president, Rodrigo Pacheco, appointed Paulo Abi-Ackel (PSDB-MG) as the new rapporteur, an ally of President Michel Temer, who presented a report against the admissibility of the accusation. This report would be approved by the committee with 41 votes to 24.

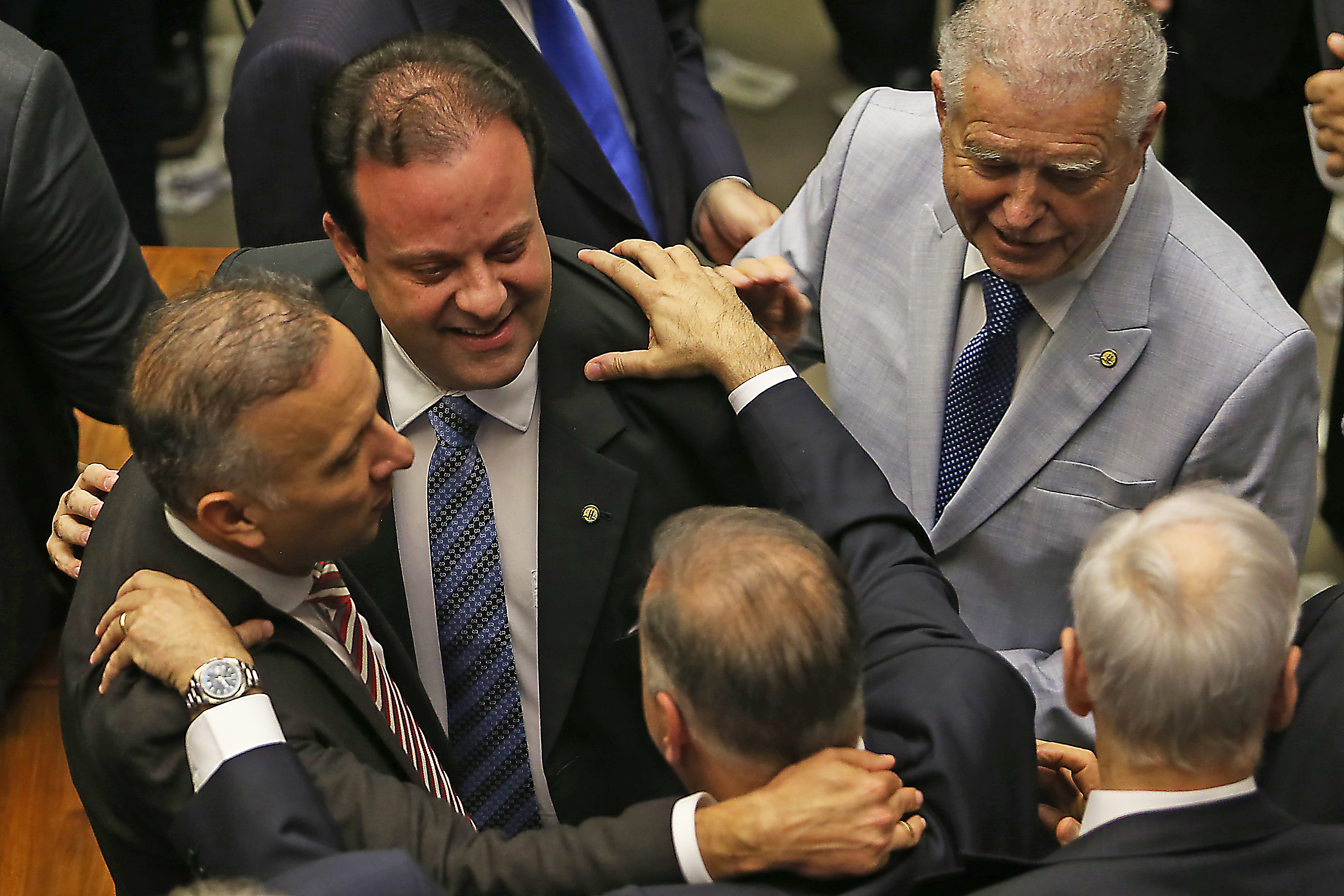
Deputies from the government base celebrate the favorable result after the vote on the accusation in the Chamber.

After the vote in the Chamber's Constitution and Justice Committee, members of the PSOL and REDE requested the Prosecutor General's Office to initiate an investigation into the release of amendments by the government during the analysis of the accusation against President Michel Temer in the Chamber of Deputies. According to the NGO Contas Abertas, lawmakers who openly declared support for the Temer government were promised an average of one million reais more than the deputies who would vote in favor of the accusation. The SIAFI, the federal government's accounting system, estimated that in just the first thirteen days of July, the government committed to spending R$1.9 billion on amendments.

On August 2, 2017, the Chamber of Deputies voted on the report from the Constitution and Justice Committee, authored by Deputy Paulo Abi-Ackel, which rejected the first accusation from the Prosecutor General's Office. The report received 263 favorable votes, 227 contrary votes, with 19 absences and 2 abstentions being recorded.

== Second impeachment charge ==
Accusations against Michel Temer by the Attorney General's Office
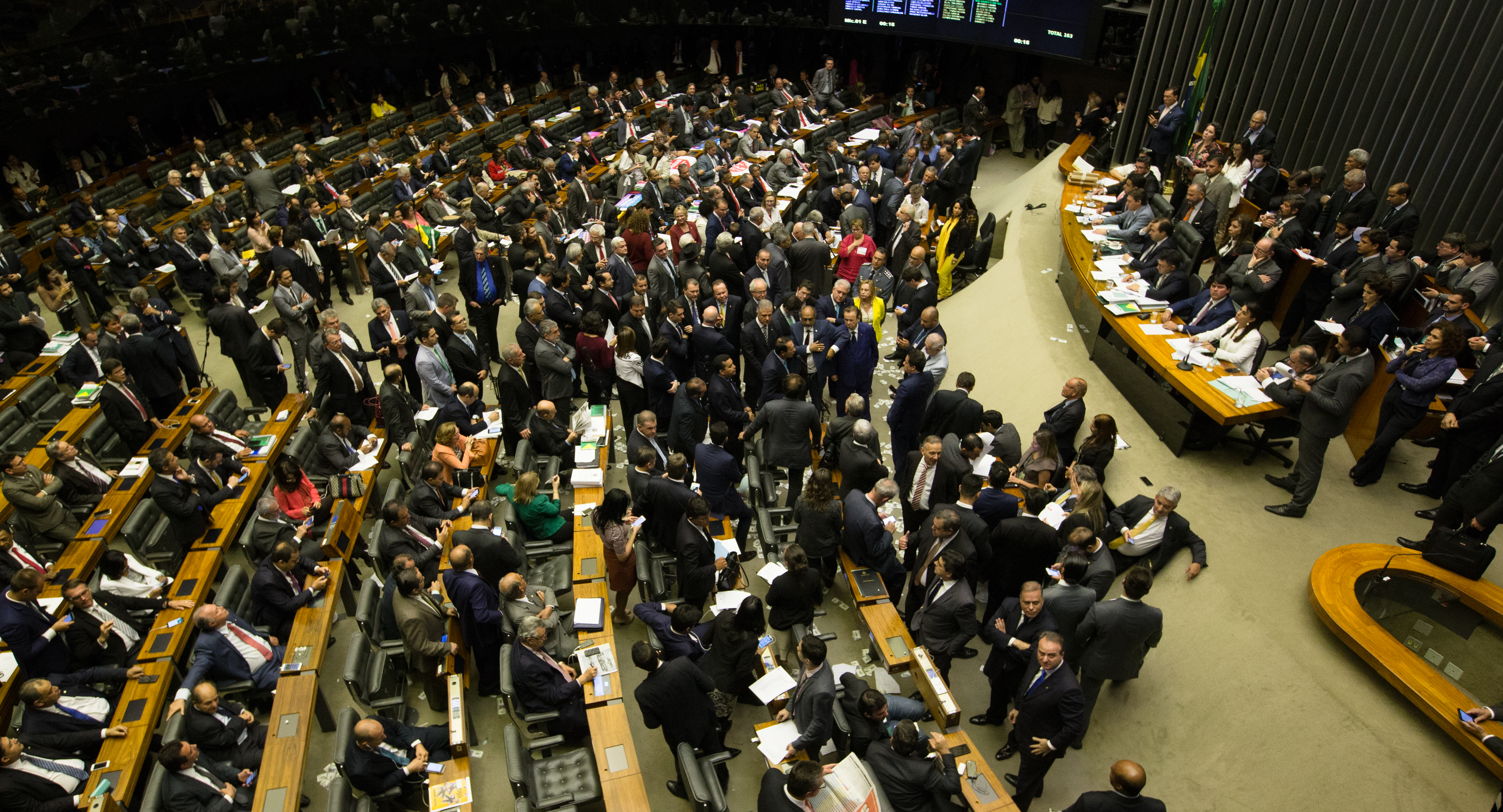
- Chamber plenary during the first voting of the second indictment against president Temer.
- Accused: Michel Temer, President of Brazil; Eliseu Padilha, Chief of Staff; Moreira Franco, Secretary-General of the Presidency
- Proponents: Rodrigo Janot, Prosecutor General
- Date: 14 September 2017 – 25 October 2017; 1 month, 1 week and 4 days
- Outcome: Complaint archived
- Charges: Criminal organization, obstruction of justice

Congressional votes

Voting in the Chamber of Deputies Constitution and Justice Commission
- Accusation: Vote to reject the complaint
- Votes in favor: 39
- Votes against: 26
- Result: Report accepted

Voting in the Chamber of Deputies
- Accusation: Vote to reject the complaint
- Votes in favor: 251
- Votes against: 233
- Present: 2
- Not voting: 25
- Result: Complaint archived

Before leaving the position of Prosecutor General, in September, Janot decided to present charges related to the main line of investigation of Operation Car Wash, which began in 2015. These charges included two accusations against the leadership of the PMDB – referred to as the "PMDB Gang": one for the party's faction in the Senate and another for the party's faction in the Chamber of Deputies. As former president of the Chamber, Temer was included in the latter.

The charges presented by the Prosecutor General accused President Michel Temer of leading a criminal organization since May 2016, when he temporarily assumed the government after the removal of former President Dilma Rousseff. According to Janot, Temer acquired power with the leadership of the so-called PMDB in the Chamber, a political core that diverted resources from Petrobras and various government agencies. According to the charges, this group began to concentrate powers that previously belonged to the Workers' Party in the corruption scheme uncovered by Operation Car Wash.

The website UOL News summarized the content of the charges in five points:

1. Action group: Temer would have acted as the coordinator of a political group that committed crimes against public administration, as well as against the Chamber of Deputies, since 2006 when he was a federal deputy. This group would be composed of the following politicians: Eduardo Cunha, Henrique Eduardo Alves, Geddel Vieira Lima, Rodrigo Rocha Loures, Eliseu Padilha, and Moreira Franco. Together, they would have received over 587 million reais in bribes, causing a loss of 29 billion reais to Petrobras;
2. Distributor: Temer, with the powers of national president of the PMDB, would distribute positions in the federal government, receiving in return a share of the bribe collected by Moreira Franco, Geddel Vieira Lima, Eliseu Padilha, and especially Eduardo Cunha. According to Janot, Temer, acting as the apex and foundation, provided security to this organization, allowing the involved companies to count on discretion and, above all, Michel Temer's guidance;
3. Obstruction: Temer would have also tried to obstruct the investigations, inciting executives Joesley Batista and Ricardo Saud from the J&F group, controller of JBS, to pay undue advantages to Lúcio Funaro, a money changer and alleged operator of the PMDB in the scheme, and to Eduardo Cunha, in order to prevent them from reaching a collaboration agreement with the justice system. Joesley stated to the prosecution that the goal was to keep them financially comfortable and silent;
4. Recording: A conversation between Joesley and Temer was recorded in March 2017 at the Palácio do Jaburu, the official residence of the vice presidency, which is inhabited by Temer. Thus, through Rodrigo Rocha Loures, an agreement was reached for a weekly bribe payment of five hundred thousand reais to the president and a guaranteed profit of approximately ten million reais to the J&F group, controller of JBS. This amount was carried in a suitcase received by Rocha Loures, who was caught with the sum in April 2017. Janot stated that the remaining installments were not paid because Joesley reached an agreement with the Public Prosecutor's Office;
5. Negotiation of transfers: According to Janot, in 2014, Temer negotiated with members of the Workers' Party the transfer of fifteen million reais through J&F, and this bribe payment was made over several months under the direct guidance of Michel Temer to Ricardo Saud. In the words of the prosecution, the 2014 campaigns had the highest historical collection of funds transferred by legal entities, proving the result of a vast criminal scheme set up in various government agencies and state-owned companies. The PMDB alone had an increase of 122.7 million reais compared to the amounts received in 2010.

=== Judicial battle against the accusation ===
Even before the presentation of the criminal accusation, Temer's defense lawyers requested the Supreme Court to remove Janot from the investigations against the president and also to prevent a new accusation, but Justice Edson Fachin denied the requests. Temer's defense then appealed to the full court of the Supreme Court, seeking to invalidate evidence and block a new accusation, alleging "suspicion" about Janot due to the prosecutor-general's "obsessive persecutory conduct" towards the president. They also questioned the validity of the evidence obtained from JBS's plea bargain, as the collaboration agreement had been rescinded because the Federal Public Prosecutor's Office believed there had been omissions in the witnesses' testimonies. On September 13, one day before the presentation of the second accusation by Janot, the Supreme Court kept the prosecutor-general of the Republic in charge of the investigations against President Michel Temer, but did not conclude the analysis of the defense's request to prevent a new accusation against Temer and regarding the validity of the evidence provided by the informants. Thus, shortly after the presentation of the second accusation against the president and members of the PMDB, the defense lawyers again turned to the Supreme Court to have the accusation returned to the Office of the Prosecutor-General, arguing that it contained allegations referring to a period when the president was not in office. Finally, on September 21, the majority of the justices of the Court decided to forward the accusation to the Chamber of Deputies, as determined by the Constitution, understanding that it was not for the judiciary to pass judgment on the allegations before the Chamber deliberated on the continuation of the process.

=== Defense arguments ===
On October 4, 2017, Temer's defense lawyers submitted a defense to the Chamber of Deputies, in which they strongly attacked Rodrigo Janot, whom they called unethical, indecent, immoral, and illegal. In a highly aggressive tone, Janot was compared to a hitman who did not accept the termination of the contract with the person who ordered the murder because he became angry with the victim. The 89-page document aimed to refute the second accusation in the Supreme Court, which consisted of charges of criminal organization and obstruction of justice.

The defense lawyers reversed their positions and accused Janot of plotting, along with the JBS informants and other confessed criminals, an accusation against the highest authority of the country. The purpose of the allegedly inept accusation would be to criminalize politics and insinuate that all political activities are contaminated by illicit practices. Continuing with this strategy, the defense criticized the way the negotiation with Funaro was conducted, so that he would make a plea bargain, accusing Janot of conducting a "bidding process" between Lúcio Funaro and Eduardo Cunha, offering benefits to whoever agreed to lie more about Temer. In addition, Janot was in a hurry to finalize the plea bargain with JBS before Temer appointed Raquel Dodge as the new Prosecutor General, which actually happened.

In summary, the defense used the following arguments:

1. Janot acted beyond his functions and with partiality;
2. the accusation insisted on reviving the "story of the suitcase" of money involving Rodrigo Loures, which had already been rejected by the Chamber of Deputies;
3. the accusatory document considered fifteen facts proven when they were still under investigation;
4. isolated words from informants do not serve as valid grounds to initiate legal action;
5. Lúcio Funaro always stated that he became aware of Temer's leadership in the criminal organization without ever reporting a single contact with the president.

In response to the content of the presented accusation, the defense also reiterated that the facts were not yet proven and that the alleged crimes took place in 2006, before the current term, reminding that the Constitution only allows for the trial of crimes committed during the exercise of the office. However, Janot claimed that the criminal organization was still active, led by the president. The accusation of obstruction of justice was also contested because, according to the defense, Temer did not order Cunha and Funaro to remain silent; he only heard from Joesley Batista that this was happening.

=== Proceedings in the Chamber of Deputies ===
On September 28, the President of the Committee on Constitution and Justice (CCJ), Rodrigo Pacheco (PMDB-MG), appointed Deputy Bonifácio de Andrada (PSDB-MG) as the rapporteur for the second accusation. The choice of the deputy caused discomfort within his party, which was divided during the vote on the first accusation when the rapporteur Paulo Abi Ackel, also a member of the PSDB from Minas Gerais, drafted a favorable opinion for Temer, aligned himself with the government, and exposed internal division within the party.

According to G1 columnist Gerson Camarotti, Bonifácio de Andrada allegedly stated that Temer asked him to accept the position of rapporteur, and the President had a direct involvement in his appointment.

The leadership of the PSDB requested that Andrada refuse to perform the role of rapporteur in the case. Given his refusal, Deputy Ricardo Tripoli (PSDB-SP), the party leader in the Chamber, and Senator Tasso Jereissati (PSDB-CE), the acting party president, decided to remove Andrada from the alternate seat on the CCJ, preventing him from acting as the rapporteur. The action was motivated by internal disagreement within the PSDB and aimed to avoid linking Andrada's favorable opinion to the President with the party's image. In a move orchestrated with the Palácio do Planalto, the PSC (which is part of the government coalition) would give up the alternate seat of Marco Feliciano (PSC-SP) to Andrada, enabling his continued role as the rapporteur. Andrada, who was referred to by government supporters as "our rapporteur," presented an opinion against the accusation.

Just like in the first accusation, the government supporters orchestrated replacements of CCJ members to ensure the approval of a favorable opinion for Temer. On October 18, the opinion against the accusation was approved by 39 votes in favor and 26 against.

The government also employed various political maneuvers and strategies to block the accusation, such as releasing parliamentary amendments and distributing positions to please the government coalition, as well as dismissing ten ministers who were on leave from their roles as federal deputies to return to the Chamber of Deputies and vote against the accusation.

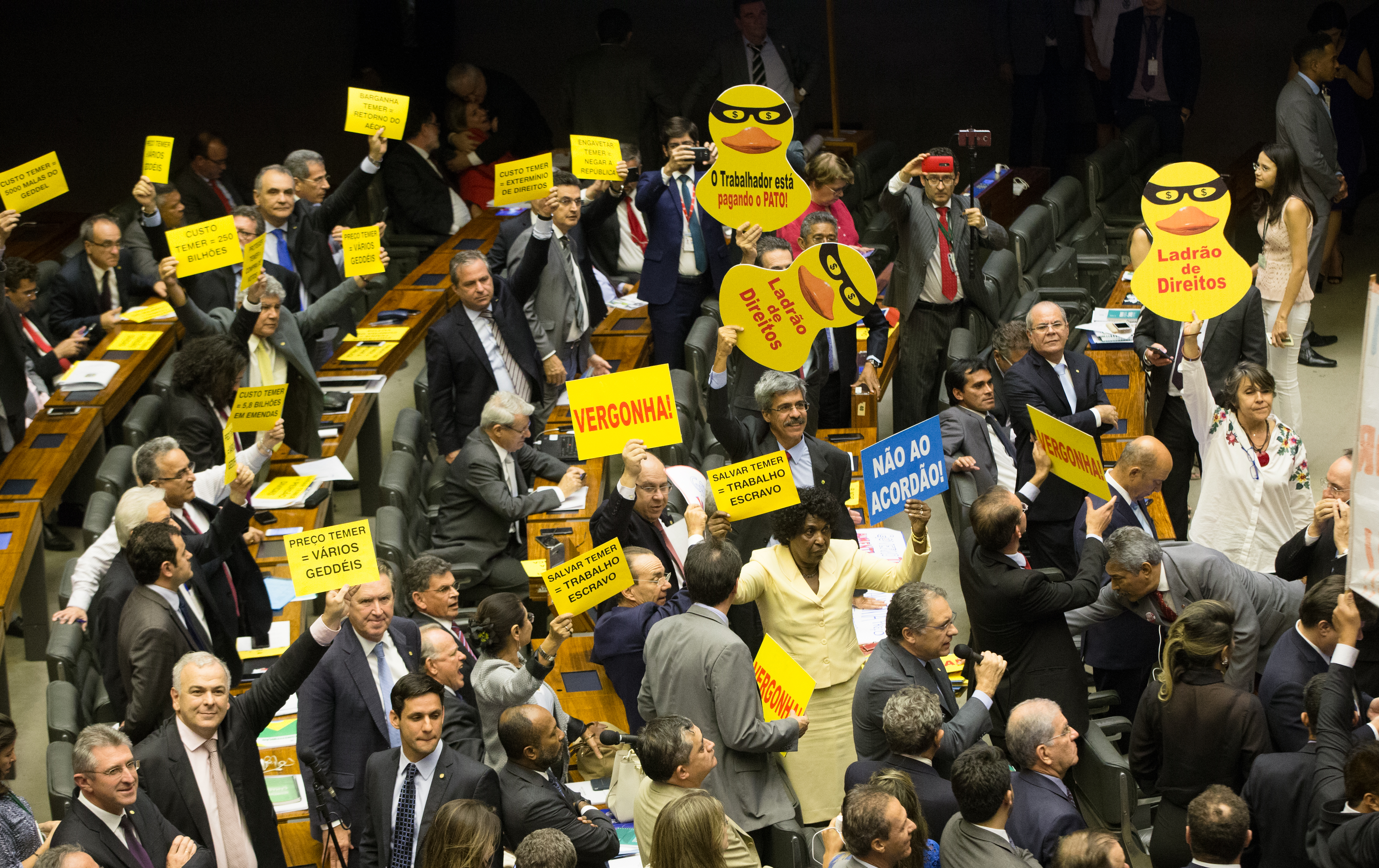
Opposition lawmakers protest during the vote on the accusation against Temer and ministers.

The plenary of the Chamber of Deputies, voting according to the opinion of the rapporteur Bonifácio de Andrada, presented in the Committee on Constitution and Justice, rejected the accusation on October 25. However, there was a decrease in support from the lawmakers towards the Planalto, as compared to the first accusation of passive corruption, which was archived in the plenary on August 2. Out of the 487 deputies present in the Chamber, Temer received 251 votes in favor, while 233 deputies unsuccessfully defended the continuation of investigations against the President. The plenary also recorded 25 absences and two abstentions. The President of the House, Rodrigo Maia, did not vote. The allied base needed 172 votes, including "yes" votes, absences, and abstentions, to prevent the admissibility of the accusation.

== Government's Negotiations and Engagements with Deputies ==
Michel Temer released significant financial resources for parliamentary amendments prior to the two votes in order to obtain favorable votes from the deputies. According to data from the Mixed Budget Committee, a total of 881.3 million reais was released in less than two months, with 607.9 million reais in the first 21 days of October and 273.4 million reais in September. In the week leading up to the vote, large amounts were released to deputies and senators: 22.4 million reais on Friday and 53.2 million reais on Saturday. Since the first accusation, the government had already committed 5.1 billion reais, with 4.28 billion reais allocated to the deputies alone, nearly exhausting the budget volume forecast for the year, which was 6.1 billion reais after the budget cut. Temer decided to disregard the budget cut and restore the original amount allocated to parliamentary amendments, which was nine billion reais in the 2017 budget. As a result, each of the 513 deputies and 81 senators would receive a quota of 15 million reais instead of the 10.7 million reais set after the cut. Individual amendments from deputies and senators must be paid, but the government can determine the pace of commitment according to its political conveniences. Temer gave up billions by catering to the requests of allies, abandoning privatizations and expanding benefits for debtors in the Refis Provisional Measure, resulting in a loss of 2.4 billion reais due to concessions, and by issuing the decree that reduced fines for environmental crimes.

In order to please the ruralist caucus, the government addressed their requests between the two votes, including signing a decree that established a "temporal framework" for the demarcation of indigenous lands, which makes new demarcations more difficult; enacting a law that relaxed and expanded the possibilities for land regularization in rural areas located in federal lands in the Legal Amazon (the so-called "Land Grabbing Provisional Measure"); issuing a directive that hampers the inspection and combat of slave labor; signing a decree that allowed mining in the National Reserve of Copper and Associates (Renca) in the Amazon; and introducing other rules that facilitate the renegotiation of rural debts and weaken environmental protection. Faced with immense negative repercussions, the decree allowing mining in the reserve in the Amazon and the decree that hindered the characterization of slave labor would be revoked.

Prior to the second accusation vote, Temer also allegedly worked to maintain the mandate of Senator Aécio Neves (PSDB-MG) through a trade of support: in return for the votes of PMDB senators in favor of Aécio, a portion of the PSDB caucus in the Chamber of Deputies would help block the second accusation against the President. On October 17, the Senate overturned an order from the First Chamber of the Supreme Federal Court that established, on September 26, the suspension of Aécio Neves from his senatorial mandate. Eighteen PMDB senators, out of the 22 PMDB senators in the Senate, voted to revoke Aécio's suspension. The choice of Andrada, who is close to Senator Aécio Neves, as the rapporteur for the case was seen as an indication of the alliance between Temer and Aécio.

== Deputies' Justifications in the Votes ==
Deputies who changed their votes between the first and second accusations against President Michel Temer provided justifications that included social media and requests from mayors. Eight deputies withdrew their support for the President, while three did the opposite. Cícero Almeida stated that he initially voted in favor in order to be released to leave the PMDB without risking his mandate, and in the second accusation, he conducted a survey among voters to determine his stance. Abel Mesquita Jr claimed to have had little experience in the first vote, but the revelations convinced him that the facts should be investigated and that no one is above the law. Heuler Cruvinel believed that the second accusation had more substance than the first, and he also respected the organized society in his region, which expressed opposition to the President. On the other hand, César Halum stated that he received requests from mayors and businessmen from his state to support the President, whom he referred to as the "lesser evil." Carlos Gomes justified his position by arguing that when the first accusation was made, there was room to pursue a direct election for president, which was his desire, and that the second accusation only repeated the content of the first.

== Consequences ==
=== Crisis in PSDB and withdrawal from government ===
The first accusation against Temer caused a division within PSDB. Out of the 47 PSDB deputies, 22 voted for the dismissal of the accusation, 21 voted for the investigation of Temer, and four were absent. The government assessed that the party, which held four ministries, would be devastated by the vote in the Chamber. Although there was an attempt to reach a consensus to vote in favor of receiving the accusation, the majority voted against the leader's guidance, Ricardo Tripoli. In his speech, the deputy said that PSDB did not desire the government's failure or the "ruin of the country," but he emphasized that there was a series of scandals causing despair among the population. Nevertheless, Tripoli allowed the PSDB members to vote according to their consciences. On the other hand, a PSDB deputy claimed that Tripoli was not fulfilling his role as a leader and that he should simply release the party's members without expressing his personal position.

During the vote on the second accusation, the party's division deepened with 23 votes in favor of the accusation and 20 against. On one side, the group aligned with Aécio Neves (supportive of the government), and on the other side, the group of independents and the so-called "cabeças pretas" (the party's young wing), led by Tasso Jereissati and Ricardo Tripoli (who followed the pro-breakup tendency).

This internal crisis became even more acute in November when Senator Aécio Neves, who had been on leave from the presidency of PSDB since May due to the disclosure of the JBS testimony, removed Senator Tasso Jereissati from the interim presidency of the party and reassumed the position to hand it over to former Governor of São Paulo Alberto Goldman. The goal was to weaken Jereissati, who had launched his candidacy for the party's presidency with a speech against corruption and recognition of mistakes. This candidacy opposed that of the Governor of Goiás, Marconi Perillo, who was supported by Aécio's followers. In late November, after an agreement reached between the two factions of the party, Tasso Jereissati and Marconi Perillo withdrew their candidacies, and Geraldo Alckmin was appointed the sole candidate to lead PSDB in an election held in December.

The consequence was PSDB's withdrawal from the government. In December 2017, Temer said that this rupture would be "courteous and elegant." Geraldo Alckmin negotiated with the president the way in which the party would abandon the positions it held in the government and support the government's goals, including pension reform. According to the agreement, Luislinda Valois from the Ministry of Human Rights and Antônio Imbassahy from the Government Secretariat would step down from their positions, with only Aloysio Nunes from the Ministry of Foreign Affairs remaining.

== Third accusation ==
A third criminal accusation against President Michel Temer, resulting from the so-called "Port Investigation," occurred on December 19, 2018, with Prosecutor General Raquel Dodge accusing Temer and five other individuals (businessmen Antônio Celso Grecco and Ricardo Conrado Mesquita, partners at Rodrimar; Carlos Alberto Costa from Argeplan; retired Colonel João Batista Filho; and Rodrigo Rocha Loures) of active corruption, passive corruption, and money laundering, before the Supreme Federal Court.

On March 29, 2018, the Federal Police carried out Operation Skala, authorized by Minister Luís Roberto Barroso, the rapporteur of the investigation into whether Temer, through a decree, favored companies in the port sector in exchange for alleged bribe payments. Thirteen temporary arrest warrants were issued by the Supreme Federal Court, as well as search and seizure warrants, with the aim of collecting evidence for the investigation. The investigation relied on documents seized during Operations Skala and Patmos, as well as information gathered from the analysis of bank and phone records and testimonies given throughout the investigation process.

The Port Investigation was concluded on October 16, 2018, resulting in the indictment of eleven individuals, including Michel Temer and his daughter Maristela, with requests for the sequestration and freezing of assets of all the indicted individuals and requests for the preventive detention of four of them. The rapporteur forwarded the investigation to the Office of the Prosecutor General, which decided to formally accuse the president, stating that "the evidence collected in the investigation demonstrates the existence of a harmful and lasting scheme of favors exchange, with Michel Temer at its center, constituting an institutionalized system of corruption." As the accusation was presented twelve days before the end of Temer's term, it was requested to the case's rapporteur that it be sent to the first instance (Federal Justice in Brasília) starting on January 1, given the lack of sufficient time for the National Congress to analyze the accusation, as provided for in the Constitution.

== Acquittal of the Accusations ==
The investigations and inquiries resumed after Michel Temer stepped down from the Presidency of the Republic, and the verdicts resulted in the acquittal of the three accusations presented by the Prosecutor General's Office.
