= Versolato =

Versolato is a surname. Notable people with the surname include:

- Mateus Versolato Júnior (born 1983), Brazilian footballer
- Ocimar Versolato (1961–2017), Brazilian fashion designer
