= 2017 Ciudad del Este robbery =

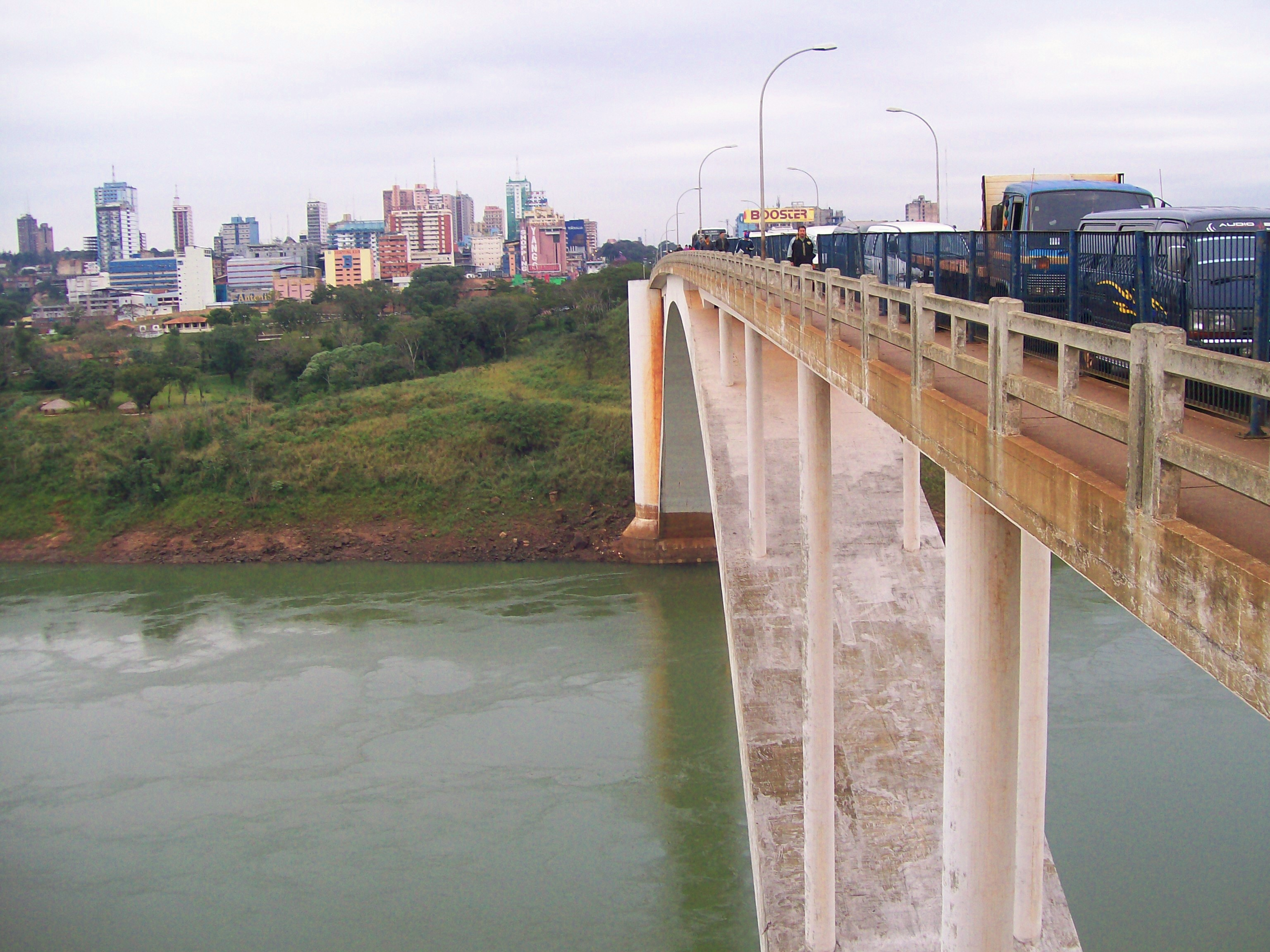
The "Friendship Bridge" crosses the Paraná River and connects Ciudad del Este (Paraguay) with Foz do Iguaçu (Brazil)

A military-style robbery of Prosegur’s office occurred in Ciudad del Este, a city in Paraguay on the border with Brazil, on April 24, 2017. The event has been termed “the robbery of the century” and “mega-robbery” by the media, and is the “biggest heist in Paraguay’s history".

In the night, about 50 to 80 heavily armed robbers closed off the perimeter of the office with cars and, during a three-hour assault, were reportedly able to access at least one of the three vaults of the company. One police officer was killed, and several people were wounded. The robbers were thought to have taken between 8 million to US$40 million. According to Prosegur, US$8 million were missing from one vault.

Authorities have assumed that the robbers came from and returned to Brazil where an apparent staging house was found across the border in Foz do Iguaçu. A subgroup of the robbers was reported to be intercepted in Itaipulandia resulting in a gun battle during which three suspects were killed and four arrested. Additional suspects were arrested in Paraná. Paraguayan police suspect that First Capital Command (PCC), a criminal Brazilian gang, may be behind the robbery.

Several police chiefs of Ciudad del Este were fired after the robbery by the interior minister.
