= As Variedades de Proteu =

Portuguese comic drama and opera

As Variedades de Proteu is a comic drama and opera by António José da Silva. The composer of the music to the opera is sometimes said to be anonymous and sometimes to be António Teixeira, who wrote the music for other da Silva operas. As Variedades de Proteu was first staged as a puppet opera in 1737 in Lisbon.

As Variedades de Proteu deals with the intricacies of marriage and love. It uses the mythological characters of Proteus (Πρωτεύς) and Nereus and includes curious characters such as the witty Caranguejo (Portuguese for crab).
