= António Teixeira (composer) =

António Teixeira (14 May 1707 – after 1769) was a Portuguese composer.

Teixeira was born and died in Lisbon. He was a royal scholar in Rome from 1714 until 11 June 1728, when he was elected chaplain-singer of Lisbon Cathedral and examiner in plainchant for the Lisbon patriarchy. He wrote some festive cantatas for members of the aristocracy and also composed the music for two Portuguese operas by António José da Silva. José Mazza stated that Teixeira composed seven operas, which were performed by large puppets at the Teatro do Bairro Alto in Lisbon between 1733 and 1739. His surviving theatrical music shows him writing in the contemporary Italian style. His most important sacred work is a 20-voice Te Deum. It alternates the polychoral style of the Roman baroque with an operatic style in the solo sections. Teixeira's sacred works are now in the archive of Lisbon Cathedral.

== Some compositions ==
- Masses
- Miserere
- Lamentations
- Motets
  - Gaudete, astra
- Te Deum, 1734
- Cantata: Gloria, Fama, Virtu - cooperative transcription of the score from the manuscript in the Wiki-score platform.
- Marionette Operas in Portuguese - mainly lost
  - except: As Variedades de Proteu (May 1737), for the theatre of António José da Silva. Score restored 1968, revived 1968, 1982, 2005.

== Bibliography ==
- Manuel Carlos de Brito: Teixeira, António, Grove Music Online ed. L. Macy (Accessed 2007-05-05), http://www.grovemusic.com
- Manuel Carlos de Brito: Opera in Portugal in the Eighteenth Century (Cambridge, 1989)
