= Inauguration of Michel Temer =

Presidential Inauguration of Michel Temer
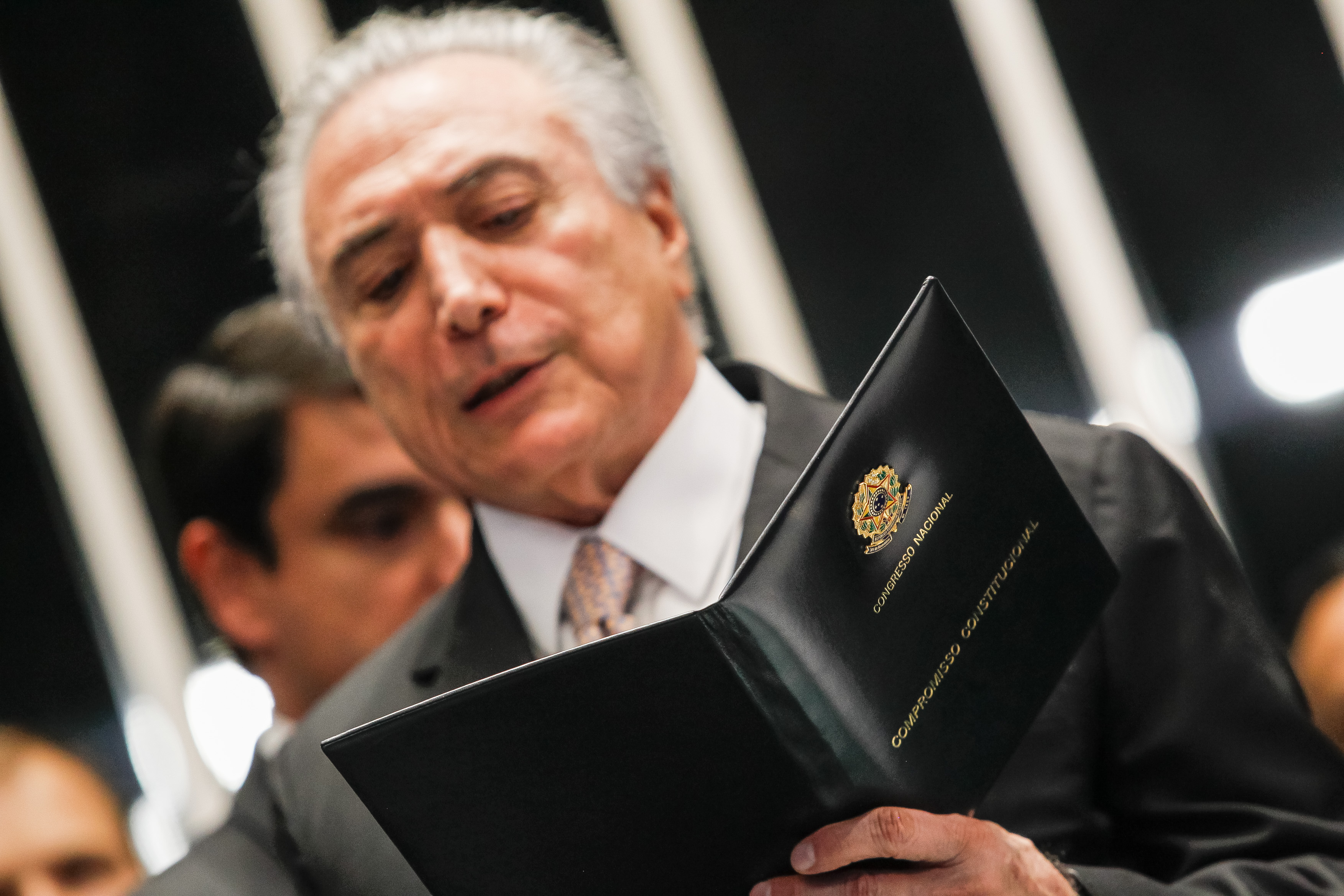
- Michel Temer takes the oath of office as President of Brazil.
- Date: 31 August 2016; 9 years ago
- Time: 4:00 pm (BRST)
- Location: National Congress of Brazil Brasília, DF
- Participants: Michel Temer; 37th president of Brazil — Assuming office Renan Calheiros; President of the Federal Senate — Administering oath

The Michel Temer presidential inauguration was held on 31 August 2016. He was definitely sworn in as president after 3 months as acting president. His inauguration occurred after Dilma Rousseff impeachment process.

The ceremony began at 4pm (BRST) at the Ulysses Guimarães plenary chamber of the National Congress in Brasília, and was administered by the president of the Federal Senate, Renan Calheiros. After reading the constitutional oath and sign the recordings book, the National Anthem was played by the Brazilian Marine Corps band.

== Background ==
The country went through a tough economic crisis, along with a political crisis. There was a retreat on the gross domestic product (GDP) for two consecutive years. The economy contracted in 3.5% in 2015 and in 3.3% in 2016. The crisis also created a high unemployment level, that reached a peak in March 2017 with a rate of 13.7%, representing 14.2 million of Brazilians unemployed.

In December, the president of the Chamber of Deputies, Eduardo Cunha, accepted an impeachment request against Dilma for high crimes and misdemeanors. On 12 May 2016, the Federal Senate suspended Dilma Rousseff from the presidency for 180 days. Immediately, Michel Temer took office as acting president. Right in his first months of government, Temer was involved in many controversies, due to some of his ministers being investigated in Operation Car Wash, as well as himself. While an acting president, behaving as if he was already a definitive president, Temer established his own government plan and put as a priority to "stop the process of free fall in economic activity" in his first speech as president. Ultimately, on 31 August, the Senate made the final trial that removed Dilma from office definitely.

== Coverage ==
On the same day that Dilma was removed from office, the Brazilian Congress called for Vice President Temer - who was acting president for 111 days - to take office as president. The solemnity occurred after the end of the impeachment trial.

The inauguration began around 4pm (Brasília Time), with his arrival to the National Congress Palace. A large number of politicians and supporters greeted him at the entrance. At the Senate plenary chamber, Temer read the constitutional oath: "I promise to preserve, defend and uphold the Constitution, observe the Laws, promote the general welfare of the Brazilian people, sustain the union, the integrity and the independence of Brazil". After the reading, the president signed the recordings book and was succeeded by the National Anthem played by the Brazilian Marine Corps band. The solemnity took only 11 minutes and there was no speech. The new president, who already had a scheduled travel, preferred to give a speech to the nation on national TV and radio broadcast.
