= Suspension of Aécio Neves from the Federal Senate =

The removal of Aécio Neves from the Federal Senate of Brazil stems from a provisional decision granted by Supreme Court (STF) Minister Edson Fachin on Thursday, May 18, 2017, determining the removal of Aécio Neves (PSDB-MG) from his position as senator. The accusation is that he allegedly asked for two million reais from the owners of the JBS meatpacking company. On May 31, 2017, through electronic drawing, Minister Marco Aurélio Mello was chosen as the new rapporteur of the process.

The senator's removal does not allow his substitute Elmiro Alves do Nascimento (PSDB-MG) to assume the position, as according to the Federal Constitution, a substitute can only be called within a period of 48 hours in case of vacancy and if the incumbent assumes a position as a minister of state, governor, secretary, mayor, or head of a diplomatic mission. Another option is the temporary leave of absence of the incumbent due to illness or personal interest, provided it does not exceed 120 days.

Senator Randolfe Rodrigues (Rede-AP) filed a lawsuit in the STF to prevent the Senate from disregarding the injunction that removed Aécio Neves. According to the parliamentarian, the possibility of disregarding the injunction was raised on Friday, May 19, 2017. On May 23, 2017, the President of the Senate, Senator Eunício Oliveira, stated that he would enforce the order to remove Aécio Neves.

On May 23, 2017, the defense of the senator presented an appeal to the STF against the removal decision. On June 30, 2017, Marco Aurélio authorized Aécio's return to the Senate and denied the request from the Office of the Prosecutor General (PGR) for the arrest of the parliamentarian, stating that the senator has an admirable career. On September 26, 2017, the First Panel of the STF decided by a vote of 3 to 2 to remove Aécio from his position again. The defense lawyer, Alberto Toron, said that the decision would be reversed in the STF due to new evidence, especially a new recording delivered by Joesley Batista, which, according to him, proves that Aécio's sister, Andrea Neves, had offered an apartment to the businessman, rather than demanding a bribe. On October 2, 2017, the senator's defense requested that the appeal against the decision of the First Panel of the STF be immediately reassigned to one of the other four justices of the Second Panel. Finally, on October 26, 2017, the Senate overturned the decision of the First Panel of the STF by a vote of 44 against and 26 in favor of maintaining it, and the senator returned to his position once again.

== Precautionary measures ==
In the decision, two precautionary measures were imposed: the prohibition of contacting any other individuals involved or defendants in the set of facts revealed in the JBS plea bargain, and the prohibition of leaving the country, with the requirement to surrender the passport.

During the second removal, the senator was obliged to comply with the following measures: nighttime home confinement, as well as being prohibited from contacting other individuals under investigation through any means and from leaving the country, with the surrender of his passport.

== Requests for arrest ==
The Office of the Prosecutor General requested the arrest, but Minister Fachin denied it. Edson Fachin made an individual decision and did not submit the request for consideration by the plenary of the STF. On May 22, 2017, Rodrigo Janot appealed the decision with a motion submitted to the STF.

On September 26, 2017, a request for arrest was unanimously denied by all the ministers. The rapporteur, Minister Marco Aurélio, pointed out that the Federal Constitution allows the arrest of a federal legislator only if there is a flagrant non-bailable crime and after authorization from the Federal Legislative Power regarding the restriction.

== Ethics Committee representation ==
Before announcing his leave of absence from the presidency of the PSDB, Aécio was informed that Rede Sustentabilidade and PSOL had filed a representation against him in the Senate's Ethics Committee, calling for his expulsion. PMDB, PT, PP, PSDB, and DEM considered voting against the expulsion request to avoid setting a precedent.

On June 23, 2017, the President of the Ethics Committee, Senator João Alberto (PMDB-MA), unilaterally archived the expulsion request, but on June 27, 2017, senators filed an appeal requesting the reopening of the case, which was signed by Lasier Martins (PSD-RS), José Pimentel (PT-CE), João Capiberibe (PSB-AP), Antônio Carlos Valadares (PSB-SE), and Pedro Chaves (PSC-MS) - regular members of the committee; Regina Sousa (PT-PI), Ângela Portela (PDT-RR), and Vanessa Grazziotin (PC do B-AM) - alternate members of the committee.

On July 6, 2017, the Senate's Ethics and Parliamentary Decorum Committee upheld the decision to archive the case. Senators rejected the representation by a vote of 11 to 4. The decision was final and could not be appealed to the Senate plenary.

== Receipt of bribe ==
Joesley Batista, owner of JBS, allegedly met with the senator on March 24, 2017, at the Unique Hotel in São Paulo. Everything would have happened after the senator's sister, Andréa Neves, approached the owner of JBS to arrange the meeting through WhatsApp and phone calls. Batista accepted the request and asked the senator who would pick up the suitcase. Both were trying to reach a consensus, and Aécio suggested that his cousin, Frederico Pacheco de Medeiros, would take the money. The bribe would be used to justify funding the senator's defense in the context of the Operation Car Wash.

On May 23, 2017, Aécio Neves published a video defending himself against the accusations and claiming to be the victim of a "setup".

On June 2, 2017, the PGR (Attorney General's Office) denounced that there is evidence against the suspended senator, indicating that he committed the crimes of passive corruption and obstruction of justice. The PGR requested that his sister, Andréa Neves, and himself pay 6 million reais in damages for the crimes (2 million reais in material damages and 4 million reais in moral damages).

== Change of Minister of Justice ==
Operation Patmos reveals that Senator Aécio Neves (PSDB/MG) was determined to remove the then Minister of Justice Osmar Serraglio (PMDB/PR). The investigators reveal that the change of the Minister of Justice would lead to a change in the leadership of the Federal Police, based on the audio in which Aécio Neves converses with Joesley Batista.

In the audio conversation between Aécio and Senator José Serra, the dissatisfaction of President Michel Temer's allied base with Osmar Serraglio is evident. Serra expresses concern and emphasizes the need for a "strong" minister. In the conversation, he wanted the Minister of Defense Raul Jungmann. Aécio suggests a personal conversation and agrees in advance with Serra, who then asks the suspended senator to establish contact with Temer.

Aécio Neves's defense stated that the dialogue was straightforward and that there is nothing compromising about both parties. They added that "analyzing the situation of the government and the ministries, in this case, the Ministry of Justice, is something natural and inherent to parliamentary activity." Serra stated that he does not remember the conversation with Senator Aécio Neves and also said that the conversation was straightforward, exclusively political.

== Real estate buying and selling scheme ==
According to the testimony of JBS executive Joesley Batista, millions of reais were sent to the senator through a scheme involving the buying and selling of properties in different cities. The building where Aécio's mother lives (a two-story penthouse with a pool and a beach view) was one of the targets and is located in the São Conrado neighborhood in the southern zone of Rio de Janeiro. The money transfer was facilitated by his sister Andrea Neves. The negotiation with Joesley allegedly took place on the same day the senator requested two million reais.

== See also ==
- Political crisis in Brazil since 2014
