= Newton Holanda Gurgel =

Roman Catholic Bishop (1923–2017)

- Bishop of the Diocese of Crato Emeritus
- Church: Roman Catholic Church
- See: Roman Catholic Diocese of Crato
- In office: 1993 – 2001
- Predecessor: Vicente de Paulo Araújo Matos
- Successor: Fernando Panico, M.S.C

Orders
- Ordination: December 17, 1949

Personal details
- Born: November 1, 1923 Acopiara, Brazil
- Died: April 6, 2017 (aged 93) Crato, Ceará, Brazil

Newton Holanda Gurgel (November 1, 1923 – April 6, 2017) was a Brazilian prelate of the Catholic Church.

Gurgel was born in Acopiara, Brazil and ordained a priest on December 17, 1949. Gurgel was appointed auxiliary bishop of the Diocese of Crato on April 10, 1979, as well as titular bishop of Gummi in Byzacena and was consecrated on May 27, 1979. Gurgel was appointed bishop of the Diocese of Crato on November 24, 1993, where he served until his retirement on May 2, 2001. Gurgel died in Crato, Ceará on April 6, 2017, as a result from multiple organ failure and respiratory failure.
