= António José da Silva =

Brazilian-Portuguese dramatist (1705–1739)

António José da Silva Coutinho אנטוניו ז'וזה דה סילווה
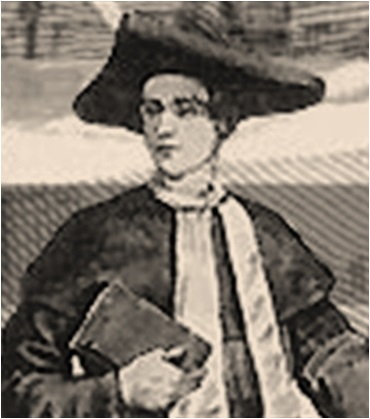
- Born: 8 May 1705; Colony of Brazil
- Died: 18 October 1739 (aged 34); Kingdom of Portugal
- Writing career
- Genre: dramatist

António José da Silva Coutinho (8 May 1705 – 18 October 1739) was a Brazilian-Portuguese dramatist born in colonial Brazil, known as "the Jew" (O Judeu). The Brazilian spelling of his first name is Antônio; António José da Silva Coutinho in Hebrew is אנטוניו ז'וזה דה סילווה.

== Life ==
His parents, João Mendes da Silva and Lourença Coutinho, descended from Jews who had emigrated to the colony of Brazil to escape the Inquisition, but in 1702 that tribunal began to persecute the Marranos or anyone of Jewish descent in Rio, and in October 1712 Lourença Coutinho became a victim. Her husband and children accompanied her to Portugal when António was 7 years old, where she figured among the "reconciled" in the auto-da-fé of 9 July 1713, after undergoing the torment only.

Her husband, having then acquired a fixed domicile in Lisbon, settled down to advocacy with success, and he was able to send António to the University of Coimbra, where he matriculated in the faculty of law. In 1726 António was suddenly imprisoned along with his mother on 8 August; on the 16th he suffered the first interrogation, and on 23 September he was put to the torment, with the result that three weeks later he could not sign his name. He confessed to having followed the practices of the Mosaic law, and this saved his life.

He then went through the great auto-da-fé held on 23 October in the presence of King John V and his court, abjured his errors, and was set at liberty. His mother was only released from prison in October 1729, after she had undergone torture and figured as a penitent in another auto-da-fé.

Meanwhile, António had gone back to Coimbra, and finishing his course in 1728–1729 he returned to Lisbon and became associated with his father as an advocate. He found what he believed to be an ignorant and corrupt society ruled by an immoral yet fanatical monarch, who wasted millions on unprofitable buildings though the country was almost without roads and the people had become the most backward in Europe. As his plays show, the spectacle struck António's observation, but he had to criticize with caution.

He produced his first play or opera in 1733, and the next year he married his cousin, D. Leonor Maria de Carvalho, whose parents had been burnt by the Inquisition, while she herself had gone through an auto-da-fé in Spain and been exiled on account of her religion. They had their first daughter in 1734, but the years of their marriage and of Silva's dramatic career were few, for on 5 October 1737, husband and wife were both imprisoned on the charge of "judaizing." A slave of theirs had denounced them to the Holy Office. Though the details of the accusation against them seemed trivial and contradictory, and some of his friends testified about his Catholic piety and observation, António was condemned to death. On 18 October, like those who wanted to die in the Catholic faith, he was first strangled and after had his body burnt in an auto-da-fé. His wife, who witnessed his death, did not long survive him.

== Legacy ==
His works bear the title "operas" because, though written mainly in prose, they contain songs which Silva introduced in imitation of the true operas which then held the fancy of the public. He was also a lyric poet of real merit, combining correctness of form with a pretty inspiration and real feeling. His plays were published in the first two volumes of a collection entitled Theatro comico portuguez, which went through at least five editions in the 18th century, while the Alecrim e Mangerona appeared separately in some seven editions. This comedy and the Don Quixote have been reprinted in a critical edition with a life of Silva by Mendes dos Remedios (Coimbra, 1905).

Ferdinand Denis, in his Chefs-d'œuvre du théâtre portugais (pp. 365–496, Paris, 1823), prints liberal extracts, with a French translation, from the Vida de Dom Quixote, and F. Wolf likewise gives selections from Silva's various compositions. Silva is the subject also of several laudatory poems and dramas, one or two of which were composed by Brazilian compatriots.

His story was dramatized in the 1995 film The Jew.

== Works ==
His dramatic works, which were produced at the Bairro Alto theatre between 1733 and 1738, include the following comedies, all played by marionettes:

- Vida do Grande Dom Quixote de la Mancha e do Gordo Sancho Pança (1733)
- Esopaida (1734)
- Os Encantos de Medea (1735)
- Amphitrião (May 1736)
- Labyrintho de Creta (November 1736)
- Guerras do Alecrim e Mangerona (carnival of 1737)
- As Variedades de Proteu (May 1737), set as a marionette opera by António Teixeira.
- Precipicio de Faetonte (1738)
