= Eduardo Portella =

Brazilian essayist, author, and professor

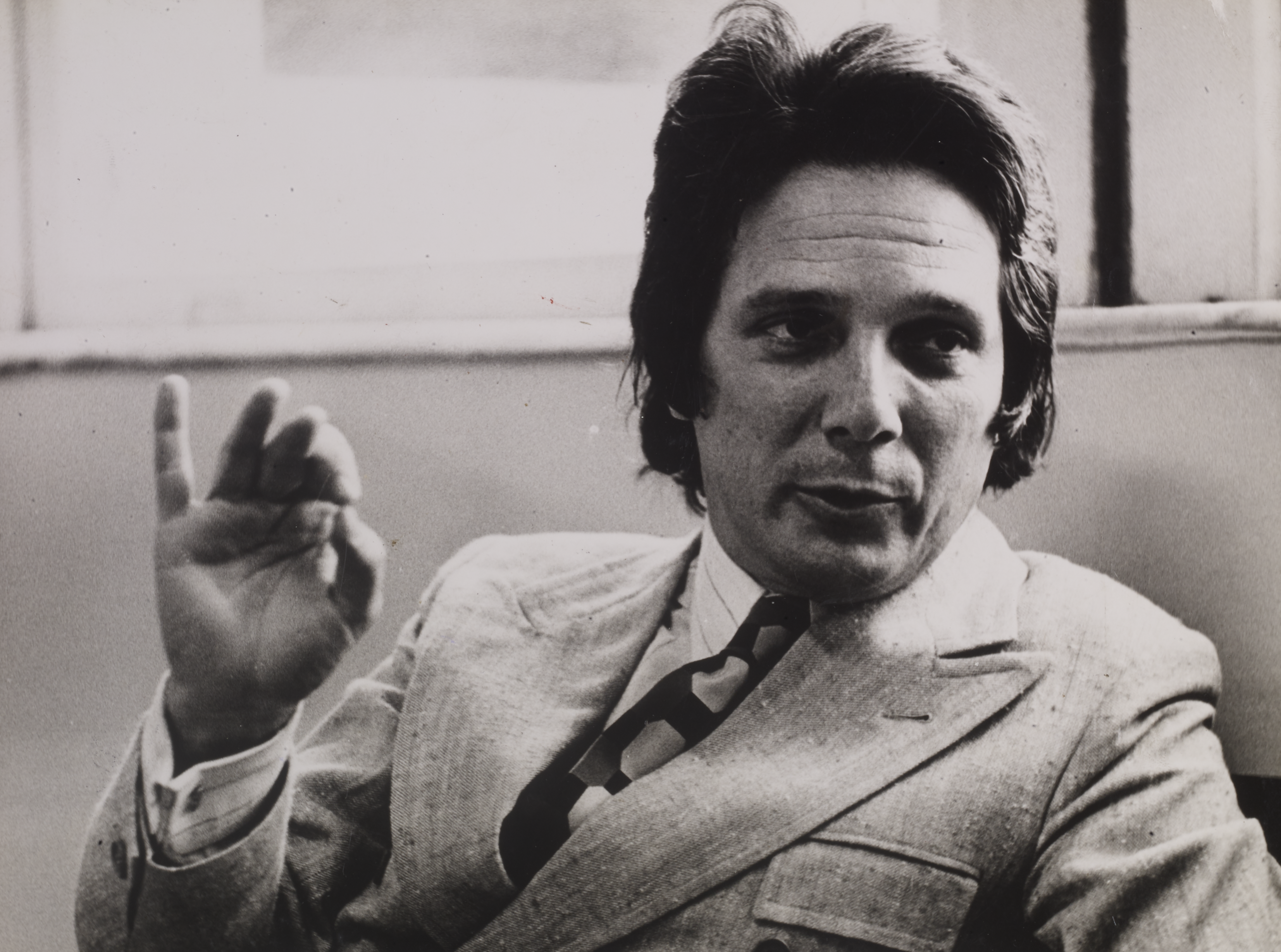
Portella in 1974

Eduardo Portella (8 October 1932 – 2 May 2017) was a Brazilian essayist, author, and professor emeritus at the Universidade Federal do Rio de Janeiro. He authored thirty books and was President of UNESCO's general conference.

Portella died of complications from pneumonia on 2 May 2017 at the age of 84.
