= Tallys =

Brazilian footballer

Personal information
- Full name: Tallys Machado de Oliveira
- Date of birth: October 26, 1987
- Place of birth: Porto Alegre, Brazil
- Date of death: November 4, 2017 (aged 30)
- Place of death: Garopaba, Brazil
- Height: 1.69 m (5 ft 7 in)
- Position: Attacking midfielder

Youth career
- 2004: Grêmio
- 2005: Cruzeiro

Senior career*
Years	Team	Apps	(Gls)
2006	Guarani-MG (Loan)		
2007–2008	Ipatinga (Loan)	1	(0)
2008	CRB (Loan)		
2009	Ipatinga (Loan)	1	(0)
2010–2011	Gama	14	(1)
2011–2012	Brasiliense	6	(0)
2012	Ceilândia	9	(0)
2013–2014	Central	44	(8)
2014	Paysandu (Loan)	4	(0)
2015	Caxias	11	(0)
- * Club domestic league appearances and goals

Tallys Machado de Oliveira, or simply Tallys, (October 26, 1987 – November 4, 2017) was a Brazilian attacking midfielder. He played for Paysandu of the Campeonato Brasileiro Série B until his death in 2017.

Tallys died in a traffic collision on 4 November 2017 in Garopaba.
