= Michel (footballer, born March 1981) =

Brazilian footballer

Personal information
- Full name: Michel Fernando Costa
- Date of birth: 11 March 1981
- Place of birth: Piracicaba, Brazil
- Date of death: 8 October 2017 (aged 36)
- Place of death: Brazil
- Height: 1.75 m (5 ft 9 in)
- Position: Midfielder

Senior career*
Years	Team	Apps	(Gls)
2001	Vasco da Gama		
?–2006	Grêmio Barueri		
2007	Slavia Prague	4	(1)
2007	→ Sokolov (loan)		
2008–2009	Příbram	4	(0)
- * Club domestic league appearances and goals as of 9 October 2017

Michel Fernando Costa (March 11, 1981 – October 8, 2017), known as Michel, was a Brazilian footballer who played in the Gambrinus liga for SK Slavia Prague and 1. FK Příbram.

Michel has played in the Campeonato Brasileiro for CR Vasco da Gama. He scored a goal in Grêmio Barueri's 2006 Campeonato Paulista Série A2 title-clinching 4–1 victory over Sertãozinho.
