= Ruth Escobar =

Brazilian actress (1935–2017)

- Born: Maria Ruth dos Santos; March 31, 1935; Campanhã neighborhood, Porto, Portugal
- Died: October 5, 2017 (aged 82); São Paulo, Brazil
- Occupation(s): Actress businesswoman politician
- Spouse: Carlos Henrique de Escobar Fagundes

Maria Ruth dos Santos Escobar, known professionally as Ruth Escobar (March 31, 1935 – October 5, 2017) was a Portuguese-born Brazilian film and television actress, businesswoman, and politician. A prominent icon in Brazilian theater, Escobar was one of the country's leading cultural producers and activists for the arts.

== Biography ==
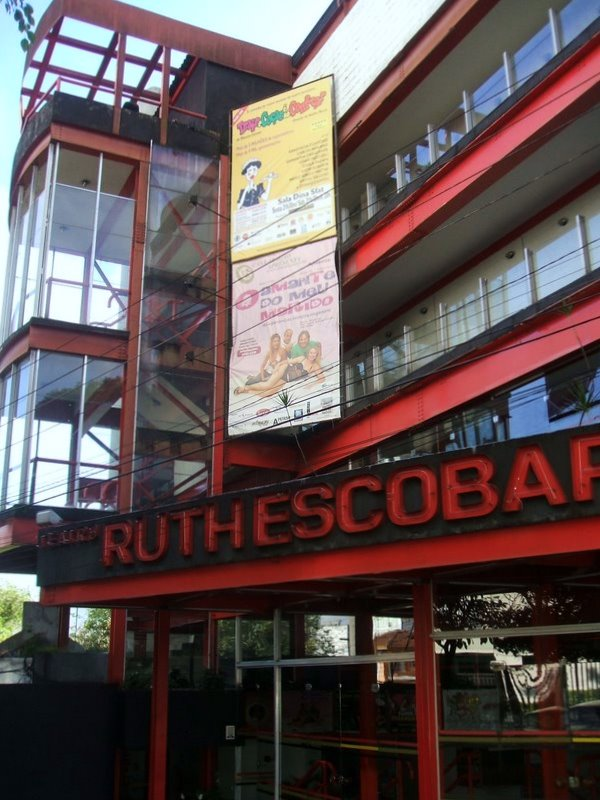
The Teatro Ruth Escobar, which was founded by Escobar in 1963.

Escobar was born in Porto, Portugal, on March 31, 1935. She emigrated from Portugal to Brazil in 1951, settled in São Paulo, and married Carlos Henrique de Escobar Fagundes, a philosopher, poet and playwright. She then studied acting in Paris, France, and then returned to São Paulo, where she founded her own theater company called Novo Teatro.

She founded another theater, now known as the Teatro Ruth Escobar, in São Paulo in 1964. It became a center of avant-garde art throughout the 1960s and 1970s. Her productions included The Threepenny Opera and the Entertaining Mr Sloane.

In 1974, Escobar founded the first Festival Internacional de Teatro (International Festival of Theater) to bring world theater productions to Brazil. She successfully brought numerous international productions and actors to São Paulo for the festivals, including the productions of Bob Wilson's Time and Life of Joseph Stalin and Victor Garcia's Yerma. Escobar also brought the Catalan group Els Joglars, the Hamada Zenia Gekijo company of Japan, City Players of Iran, and Grupo G.Belli of Italy to Brazil for the festivals.

During the 1980s, Ruth Escobar left the theater to focus on politics and community affairs. She was twice elected to the Legislative Assembly of São Paulo for two terms in 1983 and 1987, where she focused on community and cultural projects.

In 1987, Escobar released her autobiography, "Maria Ruth-Uma Autobiografia", and returned to the theater. She appeared in a film 'Romance' in 1988 and in Relações Perigosas in 1990.

Escobar's film roles included the historical drama, The Jew, in 1996.

Ruth Escobar died in São Paulo, Brazil, on October 5, 2017, at the age of 81. She had been hospitalized in the city's Hospital Nove de Julho at the time of her death. She had been diagnosed with Alzheimer's disease in 2011.
