= Itaipulândia =

Coordinates: 25.1369°S 54.3019°W

- Municipality

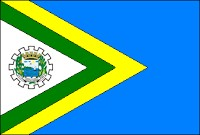
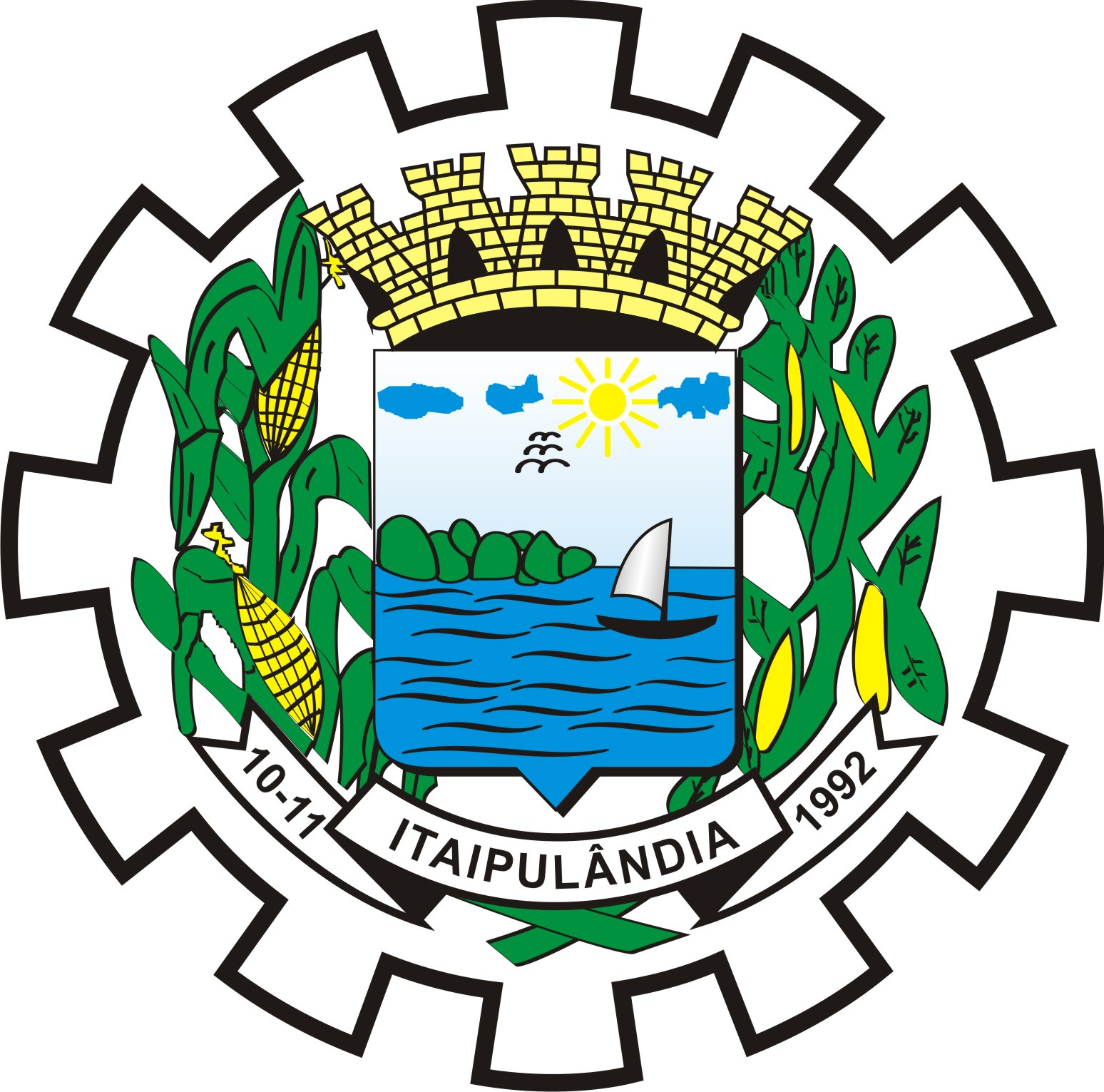
- Flag Coat of arms
- Interactive map of Itaipulândia
- Country: Brazil
- Region: Southern
- State: Paraná
- Mesoregion: Oeste Paranaense

Population (2020)
  - Total: 11,385
- Time zone: UTC−3 (BRT)

Itaipulândia is a municipality in the state of Paraná in the Southern Region of Brazil.

== See also ==
- List of municipalities in Paraná
