= Johnson Kendrick =

Brazilian footballer (1992–2017)

Personal information
- Full name: Johnson Kendrick Costa
- Date of birth: 27 January 1992
- Place of birth: Brazil
- Date of death: 7 July 2017 (aged 25)
- Place of death: Guarujá, São Paulo, Brazil
- Position: Forward

Senior career*
Years	Team	Apps	(Gls)
2012–2016	Muaither		
2016–2017	Al-Gharafa	26	(3)
- * Club domestic league appearances and goals

Johnson Kendrick Costa (Arabic: جونسون كيندريك; 27 January 1992 – 7 July 2017) was a Brazilian footballer who last played for Al-Gharafa.

== Death ==
On 7 July 2017, Kendrick was shot in the face after a robbery attempt while on holiday in his native country. He was due to return to Qatar the following day.
