= Diocese of Crato =

Catholic ecclesiastical territory

Diocese of Crato Dioecesis Cratensis Diocese de Crato

Catholic
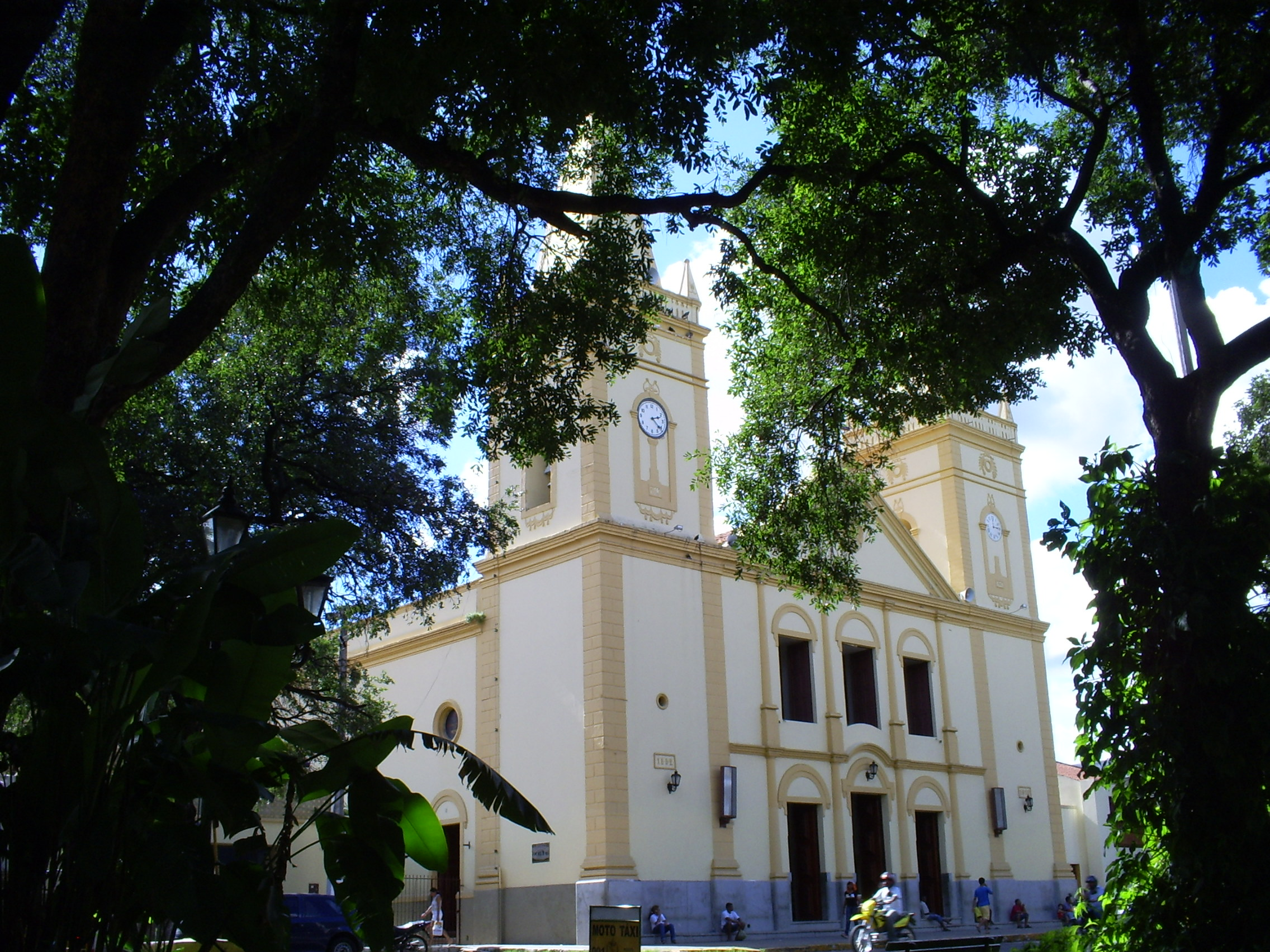
- Cathedral of Our Lady of the Rock

- Coat of arms

Location
- Country: Brazil
- Ecclesiastical province: Fortaleza
- Metropolitan: Fortaleza
- Coordinates: 7.2345°S 39.4130°W

Statistics
- Area: 18,645 km^{2} (7,199 sq mi)
- Population: Total; Catholics: (as of 2006); 954,411; 810,295 (84.9%)

Information
- Rite: Latin Rite
- Established: 20 October 1914 (111 years ago)
- Cathedral: Cathedral of Our Lady of the Rock in Crato, Ceará

Current leadership
- Pope: Leo XIV
- Bishop: Magnus Henrique Lopes, OFMCap
- Metropolitan Archbishop: José Antônio Aparecido Tosi Marques
- Bishops emeritus: Fernando Panico, MSC

The Roman Catholic Diocese of Crato (Latin: Dioecesis Cratensis) is located in the ecclesiastical province of Fortaleza in Brazil.

== History ==
- October 20, 1914: Established as Diocese of Crato from the Diocese of Ceará

== Bishops ==
- Bishops of Crato (Roman rite), in reverse chronological order
  - Bishop Magnus Henrique Lopes, OFMCap (2022.01.12 – ...)
  - Bishop Gilberto Pastana de Oliveira (2016.12.28 – 2021.06.02)
  - Bishop Fernando Panico, MSC (2001.05.02 – 2016.12.28)
  - Bishop Newton Holanda Gurgel (1993.11.24 – 2001.05.02)
  - Bishop Vicente de Paulo Araújo Matos (1961.01.28 – 1992.06.01)
  - Bishop Francisco de Assis Pires (later Archbishop) (1931.08.11 – 1959.07.11)
  - Bishop Quintino Rodrigo de Oliveira e Silva (1915.03.10 – 1929.12.29)

=== Coadjutor bishop ===
- Gilberto Pastana de Oliveira (2016)

=== Auxiliary bishops ===
- Vicente de Paulo Araújo Matos (1955-1961), appointed Bishop here
- Newton Holanda Gurgel (1979-1993), appointed Bishop here

=== Other priests of this diocese who became bishops ===
- Joaquim Ferreira de Melo, appointed Bishop of Pelotas, Rio Grande do Sul in 1921
- Francisco Edimilson Neves Ferreira, appointed Bishop of Tianguá, Ceara in 2017
