= Marcelo Rezende =

Brazilian journalist and television presenter (1951–2017)

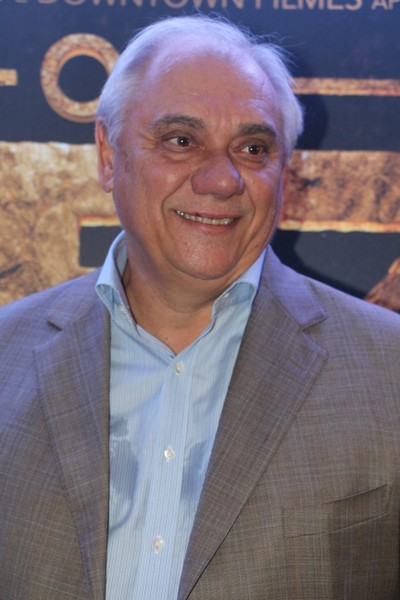
- Rezende in 2016, at a test screening of Os Dez Mandamentos: O Filme
- Born: Marcelo Luiz Rezende Fernandes; November 12, 1951; Rio de Janeiro, Brazil
- Died: September 16, 2017 (aged 65); São Paulo, Brazil
- Occupations: Journalist and television presenter

Marcelo Luiz Rezende Fernandes (November 12, 1951 – September 16, 2017) was a Brazilian journalist and television presenter.

He began his career as a sports journalist in the city of Rio de Janeiro in the coverage of several major games in the 1970s.

== Biography ==
Rezende worked at Rede Globo for 23 years as a reporter, where he was hired to present the Linha Direta police program until December 2000. He was last seen on RecordTV, where he presented the Cidade Alerta program. In May 2017 Rezende was diagnosed with pancreatic and liver cancer, and eventually died on September 16, 2017, at 17:45 BRT, after suffering from multiple organ failure.
