= Teatro Ruth Escobar =

Theatre in São Paulo, Brazil

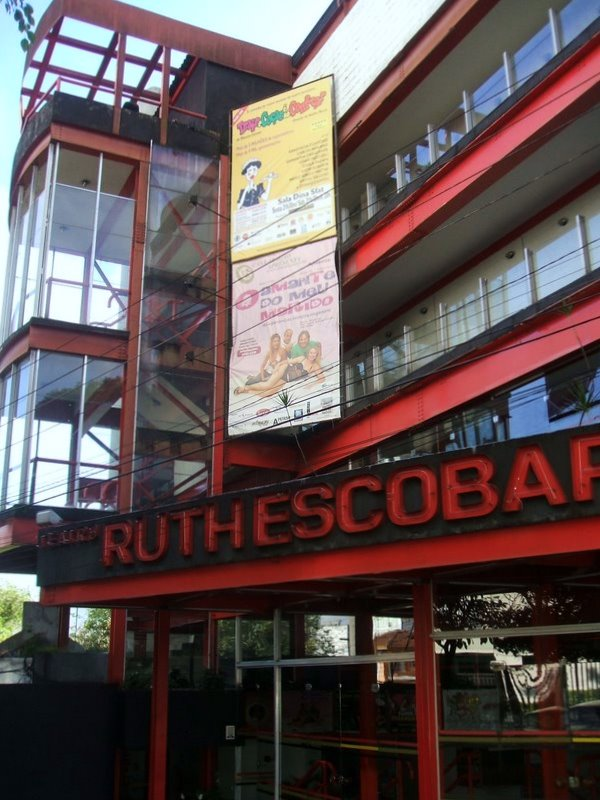
- Teatro Ruth Escobar exterior
- Interactive map of the Teatro Ruth Escobar area

General information
- Location: Rua dos Ingleses, 209; Morro dos Ingleses, São Paulo, Brazil
- Coordinates: 23°33′34.42″S 46°38′48.35″W
- Named for: Ruth Escobar
- Opened: 1963; 63 years ago

Website
- www.teatroruthescobar.com.br

Teatro Ruth Escobar is a theatre in São Paulo, Brazil. It is named for the actress Ruth Escobar, who founded the theater in 1963.
