= Opinion polling on the Michel Temer presidency =

Surveying on Brazilian administration

The following tables and graphs show the popularity indexes of Michel Temer presidency. One table and graph show the result of opinion polls made about how the population evaluates the government, and the other ones show the government comparative with the previous one, of former President Dilma Rousseff.

== Overall administration evaluation ==
plurality approval neutral evaluation plurality disapproval

Polling group	Date	Sample size	Good / Excellent	Regular	Bad / Terrible	Unsure / No opinion	Net ±								
Polling group	Date	Sample size	Good / Excellent	Regular	Bad / Terrible	Unsure / No opinion	Net ±	Ibope	21–24 June 2018	2,000	4%	16%	79%	1%	−63%
Polling group	Date	Sample size	Good / Excellent	Regular	Bad / Terrible	Unsure / No opinion	Net ±	Datafolha	6–7 June 2018	2,824	3%	14%	82%	0%	−68%
CNT/MDA	9–12 May 2018	2,002	4.3%	21.8%	71.2%	2.7%	−49.4%								
Vox Populi	13–15 April 2018	2,000	4%	21%	73%	2%	−52%								
Datafolha	11–13 April 2018	4,194	6%	23%	70%	1%	−47%								
Ibope	22–25 March 2018	2,000	5%	21%	72%	2%	–51%								
CNT/MDA	28 February–3 March 2018	2,002	4.3%	20.3%	73.3%	2.1%	–53.0%								
Datafolha	29–30 January 2018	2,826	6%	22%	70%	2%	–48%								
Ipsos	2–11 January 2018	1,200	2%	14%	83%	1%	–69%								
Paraná Pesquisas	18–21 December 2017	2,020	5.2%	20.6%	72.9%	1.3%	–52.3%								
Ipsos	1–12 December 2017	1,200	2%	10%	87%	1%	–77%								
DataPoder360	8–11 December 2017	2,210	7%	15%	73%	5%	–58%								
Ibope	7–10 December 2017	2,000	6%	19%	74%	1%	–55%								
Datafolha	29–30 November 2017	2,765	5%	23%	71%	1%	–48%								
DataPoder360	16–18 November 2017	2,171	5%	19%	71%	5%	–52%								
Ipsos	1–14 November 2017	–	1%	12%	86%	1%	–74%								
DataPoder360	26–29 October 2017	2,016	4%	20%	71%	5%	–51%								
Ipsos	October 2017	–	2%	10%	87%	1%	–77%								
Datafolha	27–28 September 2017	2,772	5%	20%	73%	2%	–53%								
Paraná Pesquisas	18–22 September 2017	2,040	6.2%	17.1%	75.2%	1.6%	–58.1%								
Ibope	15–20 September 2017	2,000	3%	16%	77%	4%	–61%								
DataPoder360	15–17 September 2017	2,280	3%	16%	79%	2%	–63%								
CNT/MDA	13–16 September 2017	2,002	3.4%	18.0%	75.6%	3.0%	–53.6%								
Ipsos	September 2017	–	2%	12%	84%	2%	–72%								
DataPoder360	12–14 August 2017	2,088	5%	15%	75%	5%	–60%								
Ipsos	1–14 August 2017	–	1%	12%	86%	1%	–74%								
Paraná Pesquisas	24–27 July 2017	2,020	4.6%	15.0%	79.1%	1.4%	–64.1%								
Ibope	13–16 July 2017	2,000	5%	21%	70%	4%	–49%								
Ipsos	1–14 July 2017	1,200	2%	11%	85%	2%	–74%								
DataPoder360	9–10 July 2017	2,178	7%	16%	76%	2%	–60%								
Datafolha	21–23 June 2017	2,771	7%	23%	69%	1%	–46%								
DataPoder360	17–19 June 2017	2,096	2%	18%	75%	5%	–57%								
Ipsos	1–13 June 2017	1,200	2%	12%	84%	2%	–72%								
CUT/Vox Populi	2–4 June 2017	–	3%	20%	75%	2%	–55%								
Paraná Pesquisas	25–29 May 2017	2,022	6.4%	17.1%	74.8%	1.7%	–57.7%								
Ipsos	1–13 May 2017	1,200	3%	15%	80%	3%	–65%								
DataPoder360	7–8 May 2017	2,157	10%	23%	65%	2%	–42%								
Datafolha	26–27 April 2017	2,781	9%	28%	61%	2%	–33%								
Ipsos	1–12 April 2017	1,200	4%	19%	75%	2%	–56%								
CUT/Vox Populi	6–10 April 2017	2,000	5%	28%	65%	2%	–37%								
DataPoder360	31 March–1 April 2017	1,684	5%	28%	64%	3%	–36%								
Ibope	16–19 March 2017	2,000	10%	31%	55%	4%	–24%								
Ipsos	1–12 March 2017	1,200	6%	26%	62%	6%	–36%								
Paraná Pesquisas	12–15 February 2017	2,020	12.4%	35.8%	49.8%	2.0%	–14.0%								
Ipsos	February 2017	1,200	7%	29%	59%	5%	–30%								
CNT/MDA	8–11 February 2017	2,002	10.3%	38.9%	44.1%	6.7%	–5.2%								
Ipsos	5–18 January 2017	1,200	6%	27%	59%	8%	–32%								
CUT/Vox Populi	10–14 December 2016	2,500	8%	32%	55%	5%	–23%								
Datafolha	7–8 December 2016	2,828	10%	34%	51%	5%	–17%								
Paraná Pesquisas	6–8 December 2016	2,016	15.9%	35.1%	46.9%	2.1%	–11.8%								
Ibope	1–4 December 2016	2,002	13%	35%	46%	6%	–11%								
CNT/MDA	13–16 October 2016	2,002	14.6%	36.1%	36.7%	12.6%	–0.6%								
CUT/Vox Populi	9–13 October 2016	2,000	11%	34%	40%	15%	–6%								
Ibope	20–25 September 2016	2,002	14%	34%	39%	13%	–5%								
Datafolha	14–15 July 2016	2,792	14%	42%	31%	13%	+9%								
Ibope	24–27 June 2016	2,002	13%	36%	39%	12%	–3%								
CUT/Vox Populi	7–9 June 2016	2,000	11%	33%	34%	21%	–1%								
CNT/MDA	2–5 June 2016	2,002	11.3%	30.2%	28.0%	30.5%	+2.2%								

Results may not always add to 100% due rounding methodology employed by various polling groups.

Polling aggregates
- Government evaluation
- Good/Excellent
- Regular
- Bad/Terrible
- Unsure/No Opinion

=== Comparison with Dilma Rousseff administration ===
Polling group	Date	Sample size	Better	Same	Worse	Unsure / No opinion	Net ±								
Polling group	Date	Sample size	Better	Same	Worse	Unsure / No opinion	Net ±	CNT/MDA	7–9 June 2016	2,000	20.1%	54.8%	14.9%	10.2%	+34.7%
Polling group	Date	Sample size	Better	Same	Worse	Unsure / No opinion	Net ±	Ibope	24–27 June 2016	2,002	23%	44%	25%	8%	+19%
Paraná Pesquisas	20–23 July 2016	2,020	20.9%	51.8%	20.8%	6.4%	+30.9%								
Ibope	20–25 September 2016	2,002	24%	45%	31%	–	+14%								
CNT/MDA	13–16 October 2016	2,002	26.0%	40.5%	28.1%	5.4%	+12.4%								
Ibope	1–4 December 2016	2,002	21%	42%	34%	3%	+8%								
Paraná Pesquisas	6–8 December 2016	2,016	30.3%	38.1%	27.6%	4.0%	+7.8%								
Datafolha	7–8 December 2016	2,828	21%	34%	40%	5%	–6%								
Ipsos	5–18 January 2017	1,200	17%	34%	40%	9%	–6%								
Ibope	16–19 March 2017	2,000	18%	38%	41%	3%	–3%								
DataPoder360	31 March–1 April 2017	1,684	19%	34%	42%	5%	–8%								
DataPoder360	7–8 May 2017	2,157	20%	26%	48%	6%	–22%								
Ibope	13–16 July 2017	2,000	11%	35%	52%	2%	–17%								
Ibope	15–20 September 2017	2,000	8%	31%	59%	2%	–28%								
Datafolha	29–30 November 2017	2,765	13%	23%	62%	2%	–39%								
Ibope	7–10 December 2017	2,000	10%	30%	59%	1%	–29%								

Results may not always add to 100% due rounding methodology employed by various polling groups.

Polling aggregates
- Comparison with Rousseff administration
- Better
- Same
- Worse
- Unsure/No Opinion
