= Rocha Loures =

Brazilian politician

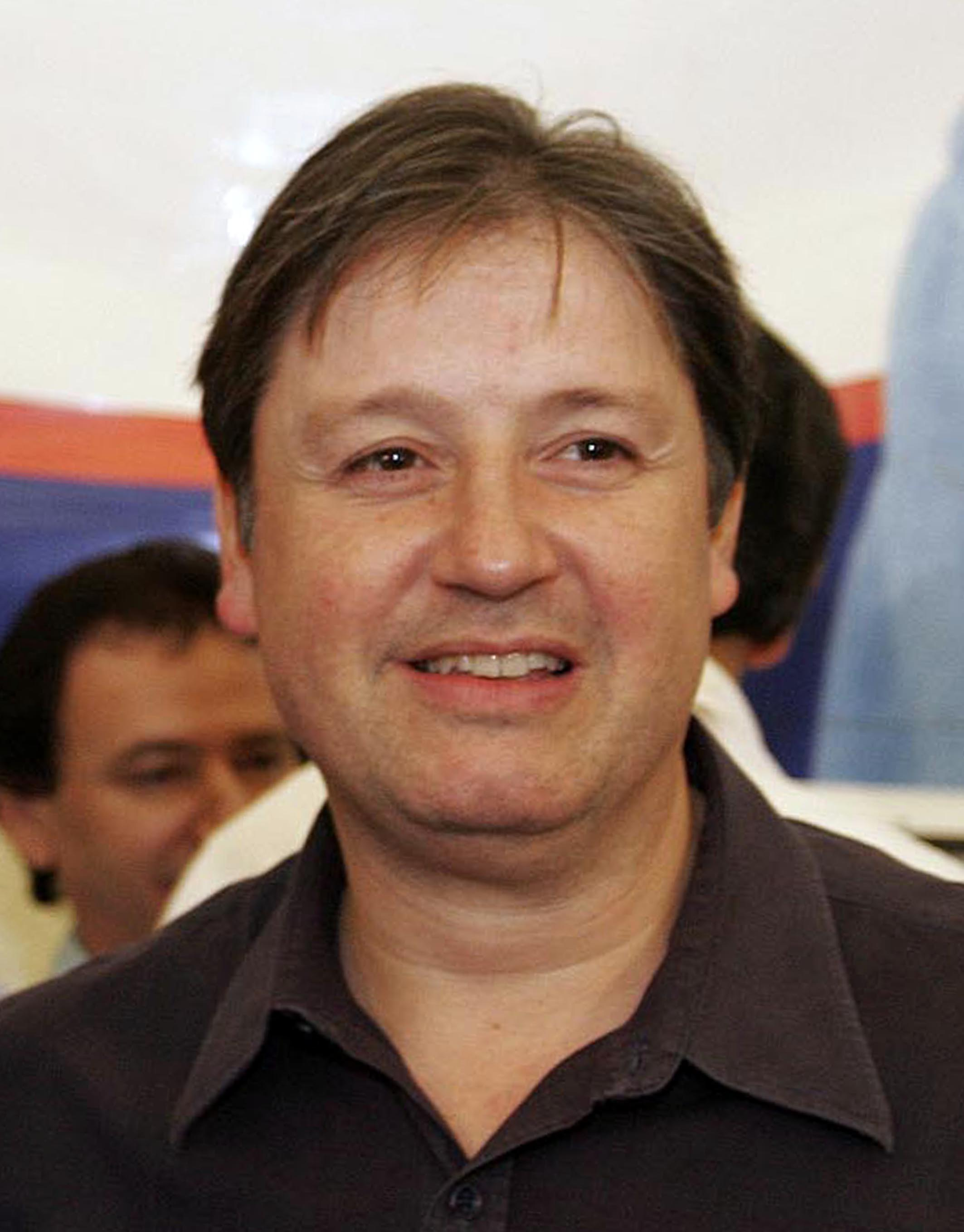
- Rodrigo Rocha Loures

Federal Deputy for Paraná
- Incumbent
- Assumed office March 8, 2017 until May 31, 2017 February 1, 2007 until February 1, 2011

Personal details
- Born: November 13, 1966 Curitiba, PR
- Party: PMDB
- Education: Getulio Vargas Foundation
- Profession: Business Administrator

Rodrigo Santos da Rocha Loures (born November 13, 1966) is a Brazilian business administrator and politician, affiliated with the Brazilian Democratic Movement Party (PMDB). He served as a Federal Deputy for Paraná and was a member of the National Executive Committee of the PMDB. He is the son of the founder of Nutrimental, Rodrigo Rocha Loures.

On May 18, 2017, the minister of the Supreme Federal Court Edson Fachin ordered the removal of Rodrigo Rocha Loures from the position of Federal Deputy. On the same day, the Public Prosecutor's Office (PGR) requested his arrest. After returning to the alternate position of Federal Deputy, following a new request from the PGR, he was arrested by the Federal Police on June 3, 2017.

== Biography ==
He graduated in business administration from Getulio Vargas Foundation (FGV) and is an executive at Nutrimental, where he developed the program that led to the creation of the Nutry cereal bar line.

== Political career ==
As a Federal Deputy, his work was mainly focused on sustainability and entrepreneurship. He was a member of the Parliamentary Front for the Environment, and coordinated the Working Group on Climate. He chaired the Special Commission on Renewable Energy, responsible for the development of the legal framework to encourage clean energy production in Brazil. In 2010, he also served on the Finance and Taxation Committee, the Education and Culture Committee, the Parliamentary Front for Housing, and the Parliamentary Front for Education, among others.

During his term, he advocated for the project Pre-salt for all and reported the bill 6,716/09, which amends 47 articles of the Brazilian Aeronautics Code.

He did not seek re-election as a Federal Deputy because he ran as a candidate for Vice Governor of Paraná on the ticket headed by Osmar Dias. He was a member of the coalition A união faz um novo amanhã (Unity makes a new tomorrow), formed by the PDT, PMDB, PT, PSC, PR, and PCdoB, receiving nearly 44% of the valid votes and losing the election in the first round to the ticket headed by Beto Richa as governor, with Flávio Arns as vice. He was invited by the Vice President of the Republic, Michel Temer, to assume the chief of staff position.

In 2014, he ran for Federal Deputy for the PMDB but did not receive enough votes to be elected, as he received 58,493 votes but lost the seat due to the coefficient of other parties. He remained as an alternate and assumed a seat in the Chamber on March 8, 2017, when Deputy Osmar Serraglio left the Parliament to take over the Ministry of Justice and Public Security. On May 31, 2017, Serraglio was dismissed from the Ministry of Justice and returned to the position of Federal Deputy, regaining the mandate from Loures.

=== Operation Patmos ===
He was targeted in Operation Patmos on May 18, 2017, one day after the newspaper O Globo revealed the existence of compromising audios and evidence against Rocha Loures, President Temer, Senator Aécio Neves, and several other political figures. Minister Edson Fachin, as the rapporteur of Operation Lava Jato, ordered the removal of Rocha Loures from the Chamber of Deputies.

He was accused of being an intermediary between President Michel Temer and the J&F Group in their dealings with the government. He was allegedly chosen to settle a dispute regarding the price of gas supplied by Petrobras to the JBS thermal power plant in the Administrative Council for Economic Defense, for which he allegedly received a 5% bribe and made a phone call to the interim president of Cade, Gilvandro Araújo, to intervene on behalf of the group. He was filmed by the Federal Police receiving a bag with 500,000 reais, delivered by Ricardo Saud, a director of JBS, after agreeing to receive weekly payments in the same amount for a period of 20 years. On May 23, he handed the bag over to the federal police in São Paulo, containing 465,000 reais, 35,000 reais less than the reported amount in the operation.

=== Imprisonment ===
On June 3, 2017, after losing parliamentary immunity due to the return of Osmar Serraglio to the position of deputy, Rocha Loures was arrested by the Federal Police (PF). The arrest warrant had been signed on the night of June 2 by Minister Luiz Edson Fachin of the Supreme Federal Court (STF), the rapporteur of Operation Lava Jato in the STF. The request for his arrest was made by the Public Prosecutor's Office. Rocha Loures was arrested preventively (before conviction) in Brasília and taken to the Federal Police Superintendence in the Federal District. Rocha Loures is also suspected of involvement in a criminal organization, passive corruption, and obstruction of justice.

== Positions ==
- Chief of Staff of the Governor of Paraná between 2003 and 2005;
- Coordinator of the actions in favor of the Millennium Development Goals in Paraná through the program Nós Podemos Paraná (We Can Paraná);
- Vice-Treasurer of the National Directorate of the PMDB;
- Treasurer of the State Directorate of the PMDB of Paraná;
- Vice-leader of the PMDB, PSC, and PTC bloc in the Chamber of Deputies;
- Creator and coordinator of the actions in favor of the Millennium Development Goals in Paraná through the program Nós Podemos Paraná between 2005 and 2007;
- Chief of Staff of the Vice Presidency of the Republic between 2011 and 2014;
- Member of the National Executive Committee of the PMDB.
