= Ocimar Versolato =

Brazilian fashion designer

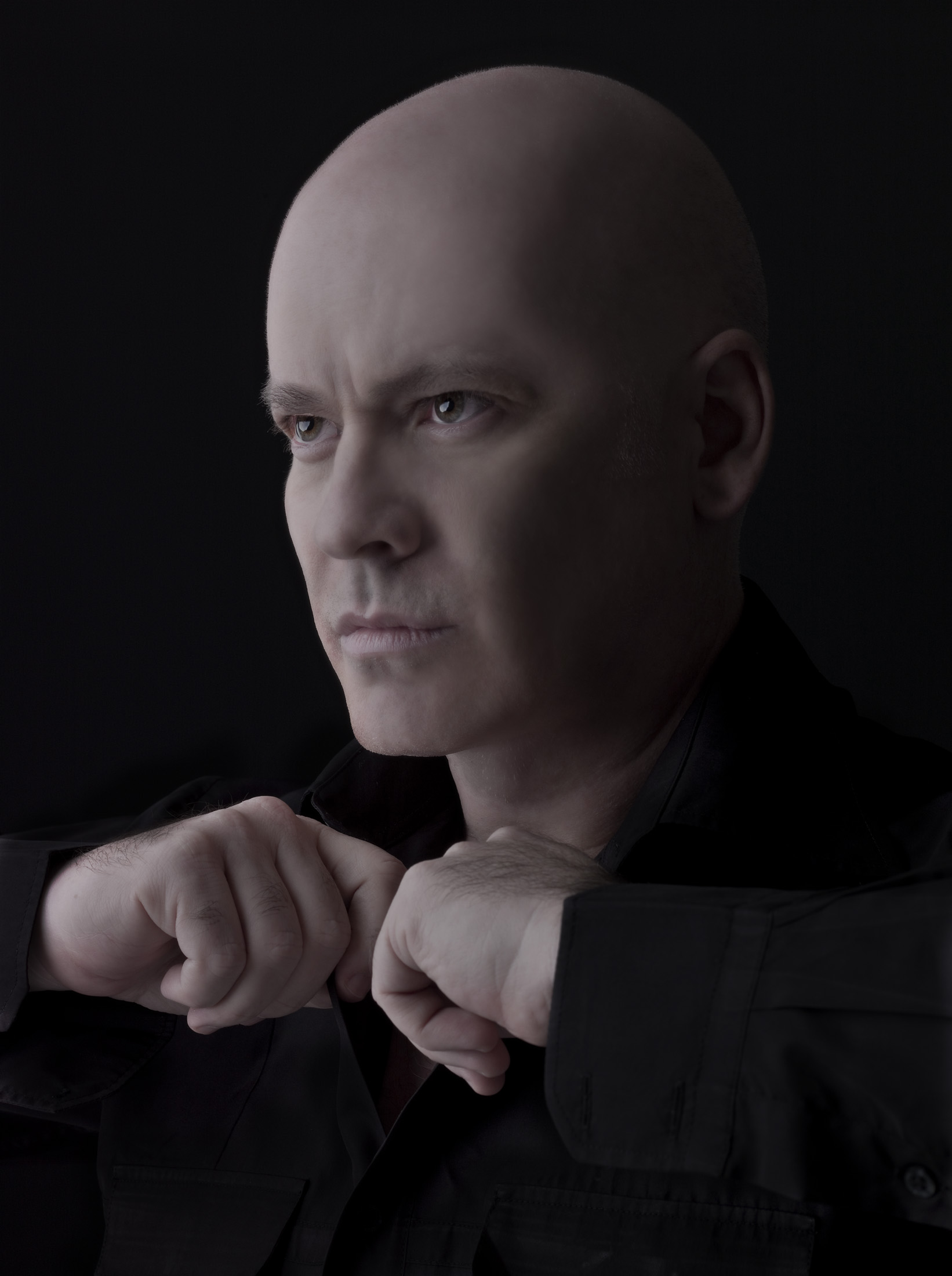

Ocimar Versolato (1 April 1961 in São Bernardo do Campo, São Paulo state, Brazil – 8 December 2017 in São Paulo) was a Paris-based Brazilian fashion designer, who at one time worked for the house of Lanvin.

== Career ==
Born of Italian immigrants in the Brazilian city of São Bernardo do Campo, Versolato moved to Paris to study at the Studio Berçot. He worked for a while at the Hervé Léger studio before establishing his own workshop in the Place Vendôme. This venture was not a commercial success and he returned to Brazil in 2000.

With new partners, he established fashion and, later, cosmetics businesses in Brazil and worked as a costumier. He created costumes for leading performers, including actresses Sonia Braga and Vera Fischer, as well as singer Ney Matogrosso. In 1996 and 1997 he again worked in Paris as the designer of four women's ready-to-wear collections at Lanvin, the first Brazilian in such a leading creative role at an international fashion house.

A controversial figure, Versolato was scornful of the fashion industry, and notably German supermodel Claudia Schiffer, in his book Vestido em Chamas (Dressed in Flames), published in 2005.

== Death ==
Versolato died in hospital in São Paulo, Brazil on 8 December 2017 of an aneurysm following a stroke.
