= The Jew (film) =

1995 film directed by Jom Tob Azulay

O Judeu
- Directed by: Jom Tob Azulay
- Starring: Felipe Pinheiro; Dina Sfat; José Lewgoy; Mário Viegas; Cristina Aché; Fernanda Torres; Ruth Escobar
- Release date: 1995
- Running time: 91 minutes
- Country: Brazil/Portugal
- Language: Portuguese

The Jew (Portuguese: O Judeu) is a 1995 Brazilian-Portuguese co-production film directed by Jom Tob Azulay with Filipe Pinheiro in the title role, Dina Sfat, and Mário Viegas as the king. It tells the story of the writer António José da Silva, nicknamed "the Jew", burned at the stake during the reign of King João V of Portugal in 1739.

== Plot ==
Portugal 1715/1739. Tortured at the age of twenty-one, António José da Silva rediscovers the meaning of life through puppet theatre. He marries Leonor Maria de Carvalho, a New Christian like him, and frequents the aristocratic salons of the Enlightenment, which support him. An accusation of heresy against his cousin Brites Eugénia and the irreverent spirit of his comedies lead António José da Silva, once again, to the prisons of the Holy Office, together with his mother, Lourença Coutinho, and his wife.

== Cast ==
- Felipe Pinheiro - António José da Silva
- Dina Sfat – Lourença Coutinho
- Mário Viegas – D. João V
- José Lewgoy – D. Nuno da Cunha
- Cristina Aché – Leonor
- Edwin Luisi – Alexandre de Gusmão
- Fernanda Torres – Brites
- José Neto – D. Marcos
- Ruy de Carvalho – Padre Pantoja
- Sinde Filipe – Marquês do Alegrete
- Santos Manuel – Professor
- Rogério Paulo – Promotor do Santo Ofício
- António Anjos – Secretário de D. Nuno
- Sérgio Godinho – António Teixiera
- Fernando Curado Ribeiro – Bispo D. Teotónio
- Ruth Escobar – Rainha D. Maria
- Cândido Ferreira - Padre
