= Deaths in October 2017 =

The following is a list of notable deaths in October 2017.

Entries for each day are listed alphabetically by surname. A typical entry lists information in the following sequence:

- Name, age, country of citizenship at birth, subsequent country of citizenship (if applicable), what subject was noted for, cause of death (if known), and reference.

== October 2017 ==
=== 1 ===
- Olivier Baudry, 44, French footballer (Sochaux), cancer.
- Hansje Bunschoten, 59, Dutch Olympic swimmer (1972) and television presenter, complications from breast cancer.
- Pierluigi Cappello, 50, Italian poet, Viareggio Prize laureate (2010).
- Dao Shixun, 89, Chinese politician.
- Bob Deacon, 73, British social scientist.
- Edward B. Giller, 99, American USAF major general.
- Robert D. Hales, 85, American religious leader (LDS Church).
- Andy Hopkins, 67, American football player (Hamilton Tiger-Cats).
- Arthur Janov, 93, American psychologist (The Primal Scream), complications from a stroke.
- Hugh Kearney, 93, British historian.
- Butch Lenton, 61, Australian councillor and community advocate, mayor of the Shire of Winton (since 2012), cancer.
- František Listopad, 95, Czech-born Portuguese poet, prose writer and director.
- Donald James Mackinnon, 88, Australian politician, member of the Victorian Legislative Assembly for Box Hill (1976–1982).
- Edmond Maire, 86, French labor union leader, secretary general of CFDT (1971–1988).
- István Mészáros, 86, Hungarian Marxist philosopher (Socialism or Barbarism) and professor (University of Sussex).
- Muktar Muhammed, 72, Nigerian military officer, Governor of Kaduna (1977–1978), cancer.
- Angelika Muharukua, 59, Namibian Herero politician, MP (since 1995).
- Samuel Irving Newhouse Jr., 89, American publisher (Advance Publications) and businessman.
- Stephen Paddock, 64, American gunman (2017 Las Vegas shooting), suicide by gunshot.
- José Pratas, 59, Portuguese football referee.
- Philippe Rahmy, 52, Swiss poet and writer, Swiss Literature Awards laureate (2017).
- Eliu Rivera, 73, Puerto Rican activist and politician.
- Dave Strader, 62, American sportscaster (Dallas Stars, Detroit Red Wings, Phoenix Coyotes), cholangiocarcinoma.
- John Swinburne, 87, Scottish politician, founder of SSCUP and member of Parliament (2003–2007).
- Larissa Volpert, 91, Russian-Estonian philologist and chess Woman Grandmaster, Soviet women's chess champion (1954, 1958, 1959).

=== 2 ===
- Peter Burke, 90, New Zealand rugby union player (Taranaki, national team).
- Warren Burton, 72, American actor (All My Children, Gettysburg, Green Lantern).
- Slip Capone, 38, American rapper.
- Evangelina Elizondo, 88, Mexican actress, artist and singer.
- Robert Elsie, 67, Canadian-born German Albanologist, linguist and translator, motor neuron disease.
- Solly Hemus, 94, American baseball player and manager (St. Louis Cardinals, Philadelphia Phillies).
- Klaus Huber, 92, Swiss composer and academic.
- Azra Kolaković, 40, Bosnian pop singer, uterine cancer.
- Edwin N. Lightfoot, 92, American biochemical engineer.
- Friedrich von Löffelholz, 62, German Olympic time trials cyclist (1976) and university lecturer.
- Norma Male, 101, Australian government administrator.
- Hanumant Moreshwar Marathe, 77, Indian writer and journalist.
- Edward Mhinga, 89, South African politician, Chief Minister of Gazankulu (1993).
- Øyvin Norborg, 78, Norwegian newspaper editor.
- Simon Ostrach, 93, American scientist.
- Paul Otellini, 66, American businessman, CEO of Intel (2005–2013).
- Antonio Pantojas, 68, Puerto Rican actor, dancer, playwright and female impersonator, heart attack.
- Jim Patterson, 67, American politician, member of the Alabama House of Representatives (since 2010), heart attack.
- Marcel Germain Perrier, 84, French Roman Catholic prelate, Bishop of Pamiers (2000–2008).
- Tom Petty, 66, American Hall of Fame musician (Tom Petty and the Heartbreakers, Traveling Wilburys) and voice actor (King of the Hill), accidental drug overdose.
- Jean Roesser, 87, American politician, member of the Maryland Senate (1995–2003), complications of leukemia.
- Patrocinio Samudio, 42, Paraguayan footballer, heart attack.
- Neil Smelser, 87, American sociologist.
- Barbara Tisserat, 66, American lithographer, lung cancer.
- Robert Yates, 74, American racing team owner (Yates Racing), NASCAR Winston Cup champion (1999), liver cancer.

=== 3 ===
- Rodney Bickerstaffe, 72, British trade unionist, General Secretary of NUPE (1982–1993) and UNISON (1996–2001).
- Robert Henry Bragg Jr., 98, American physicist.
- Ming Chang, 85, Chinese-born American naval officer.
- David Dolbin, 85, American football player and coach.
- Curtis Ford Jr., 95, American politician, member of the Texas House of Representatives (1953–1957).
- Bob Gannon, 58, American politician, member of the Wisconsin State Assembly (since 2015).
- Chittani Ramachandra Hegde, 84, Indian Yakshagana artist, stroke.
- John Herrnstein, 79, American baseball player (Philadelphia Phillies, Chicago Cubs, Atlanta Braves).
- Hornsby Howell, 90, American football player and coach.
- Norm Jamison, 67, Canadian politician, member of the Legislative Assembly of Ontario (1990–1995), liver cancer.
- Ninja Jorgensen, 77, American Olympic volleyball player.
- Michel Jouvet, 91, French oneirologist and neurobiologist, developer of Modafinil and discoverer of REM sleep.
- Isabella Karle, 95, American scientist, brain tumor.
- Kim Un-yong, 86, South Korean sports administrator, President of World Taekwondo Federation (1973–2004).
- Jack Laver, 100, Australian cricketer.
- André Lévy, 91, French sinologist and translator.
- Victorino Martín Andrés, 88, Spanish breeder of fighting bulls, stroke.
- Francesco Martino, 80, Italian politician, President of Sicily (1993–1995).
- Les Mutrie, 66, English footballer (Hull City), cancer.
- Dieter Nörr, 86, German scholar of ancient law.
- Lance Russell, 91, American professional wrestling announcer and commentator (CWA, USWA, WCW), complications from a broken hip.
- Jalal Talabani, 83, Iraqi-Kurdish politician, Prime Minister (2003) and President (2005–2014), cerebral hemorrhage.
- Norma Williams, 88, New Zealand swimmer, British Empire Games silver medallist (1950).

=== 4 ===
- Davoud Ahmadinejad, 67, Iranian politician, heart attack.
- Lawrence Argent, 60, British-born American sculptor, cardiac arrest.
- Atiqa Bano, 77, Indian educationist and curator.
- Vivian Castleberry, 95, American journalist and newspaper editor.
- Bronisław Chromy, 92, Polish sculptor (Wawel Dragon).
- Liam Cosgrave, 97, Irish politician, Taoiseach (1973–1977).
- Lyudmila Gureyeva, 74, Ukrainian-born Russian volleyball player, Olympic silver medalist (1964).
- Rufus Hannah, 63, American advocate for homeless rights, traffic collision.
- Janis Hansen, 74, American singer and author, myelofibrosis and acute myeloid leukemia.
- Karel Kolář, 61, Czech athlete, European Indoor champion (1979).
- Edward Mazurek, 78, American politician, member of the Maine House of Representatives (2004–2012), and Maine Senate (2012–2014).
- John Miller, 79, American politician, member of the U.S. House of Representatives for Washington's 1st congressional district (1985–1993), cancer.
- Jesús Mosterín, 76, Spanish anthropologist and philosopher of science, lung cancer.
- Richard Paris, 75, Australian Olympic cyclist (1964).
- Jerry Ross, 84, American producer and songwriter ("I'm Gonna Make You Love Me"), founder of Heritage and Colossus Records, prostate cancer.
- Keith Schmidt, 95, Australian cricketer.
- Yosihiko H. Sinoto, 93, Japanese-born American anthropologist (Hane excavation).
- William Tepper, 69, American actor (Bachelor Party, Drive, He Said) and screenwriter (Grilled), heart attack.
- Barry Thomas, 85, American sound engineer (Days of Heaven, Witness, 7th Heaven), stroke.
- Harry Wikman, 88, Finnish Olympic rower.

=== 5 ===
- Georges Baert, 91, Belgian Olympic basketball player.
- Heley de Abreu Silva Batista, 43, Brazilian teacher (Janaúba Tragedy), burns.
- Armin Delong, 92, Czech physicist.
- Ruth Escobar, 81, Portuguese-born Brazilian actress (The Jew) and politician, founder of Teatro Ruth Escobar.
- Kelly Gage, 92, American attorney and politician, member of the Minnesota Senate (1967–1972).
- Toon Geurts, 85, Dutch sprint canoer, Olympic silver medalist (1964).
- Georges Griffiths, 27, Ivorian footballer (Lombard-Pápa, Diósgyőr, national U-23 team), shot.
- Ted Haley, 96, American politician and surgeon.
- Dan Hanganu, 78, Romanian-born Canadian architect.
- Nora Johnson, 84, American author.
- John Knott, 78, British metallurgist.
- Eberhard van der Laan, 62, Dutch politician and lawyer, Minister for Housing, Communities and Integration (2008–2010), Mayor of Amsterdam (since 2010), lung cancer.
- António de Macedo, 86, Portuguese filmmaker, esotericism writer and professor.
- Trevor Martin, 87, Scottish actor (Doctor Who and the Daleks in the Seven Keys to Doomsday, Coronation Street, Babel).
- Jan McLelland, 60, English dermatologist.
- Kurt Mislow, 94, German-born American chemist.
- Peter Plouviez, 86, British trade union leader, General Secretary of Equity (1974–1991).
- Giorgio Pressburger, 80, Hungarian-born Italian writer, Viareggio Prize laureate (1998).
- Anna Stewart, 53, British businesswoman, CEO of Laing O'Rourke (2013–2015), non-executive director of Babcock International (since 2012).
- Sylke Tempel, 54, German journalist and writer, struck by a tree.
- Myles Tierney, 80, American mathematician.
- François Xavier Nguyễn Văn Sang, 85, Vietnamese Roman Catholic prelate, Bishop of Thái Bình (1990–2009).
- Bilat Paswan Vihangam, 77, Indian writer and politician.
- Anne Wiazemsky, 70, French actress (Au hasard Balthazar, La Chinoise) and writer, breast cancer.

=== 6 ===
- Roberto Anzolin, 79, Italian footballer (Juventus, national team).
- Tarnia Baker, 50, South African politician, member of the National Assembly (since 2014), traffic collision.
- Brian Bannon, 87, Australian politician, member of the New South Wales Legislative Assembly for Rockdale (1959–1986).
- Holly Block, 58, American museologist, gallery director in Art in General (1988–2004) and Director of Bronx Museum of the Arts (since 2006), breast cancer.
- William Arthur Cochrane, 91, Canadian physician.
- Terry Downes, 81, British boxer, world champion (1961–1962) and actor (The Fearless Vampire Killers, Caravaggio).
- Darsi Ferrer Ramírez, 47, Cuban journalist, doctor and Castro dissident, prisoner of conscience (2009–2010).
- Gao Mang, 90–91, Chinese translator.
- Lou Gare, 78, English jazz saxophonist.
- Marek Gołąb, 77, Polish weightlifter, Olympic bronze medalist (1968).
- Connie Hawkins, 75, American Hall of Fame basketball player (Harlem Globetrotters, Pittsburgh Pipers, Phoenix Suns).
- Hervé L. Leroux, 60, French fashion designer, founder of Hervé Leger, ruptured aneurysm.
- David Marks, 64, British architect and entrepreneur, co-designer of London Eye and British Airways i360 observation tower.
- Ralphie May, 45, American comedian (Last Comic Standing), cardiac arrest.
- Ian McNeill, 85, Scottish football player (Aberdeen) and manager (Ross County, Wigan Athletic).
- Mary Moore, 87, British author and diplomat.
- Angelo Munzone, 84, Italian politician, Mayor of Catania (1982–1984).
- Dick Roeding, 86, American politician, member of the Kentucky Senate (1991–2009).
- Bunny Sigler, 76, American songwriter and record producer (The O'Jays, The Roots, Patti LaBelle), heart attack.
- Judy Stone, 93, American film critic and author (San Francisco Chronicle, The New York Times, Los Angeles Times).
- Ray Turnbull, 78, Canadian curler, world championship silver medalist (1965), pneumonia.

=== 7 ===
- Kazys Almenas, 82, Lithuanian physicist, engineer and publisher.
- Hugo Budinger, 90, German field hockey player, Olympic bronze medalist (1956).
- George Dempsey, 88, American basketball player (Philadelphia Warriors).
- Hugo Dollheiser, 90, German field hockey player, Olympic bronze medalist (1956).
- Harald E. Esch, 85, German-born American biologist.
- Robert Honeysucker, 74, American operatic baritone.
- Vyacheslav Ivanov, 88, Russian philologist and semiotician, co-developer of glottalic theory.
- Jan Arvid Johansen, 70, Norwegian musician, cancer.
- Ole Krarup, 82, Danish politician, MEP (1994–2007).
- Jim Landis, 83, American baseball player (Chicago White Sox), cancer.
- Óscar Lara Aréchiga, 65, Mexican politician.
- Cosimo Mele, 60, Italian politician, Deputy (2006–2008), Mayor of Carovigno (2013–2015), stroke.
- Patrick Nair, 85, Indian Roman Catholic prelate, Bishop of Meerut (1974–2008).
- Antun Rudinski, 80, Serbian football manager and player (Red Star Belgrade).
- Konstantin Sarsania, 49, Russian football player and manager.
- Kundan Shah, 69, Indian film director (Jaane Bhi Do Yaaro), heart attack.
- Gaya Singh, 74, Indian politician, Senator (1992–2004).
- Jane Slowey, British charity worker, cancer.
- Wacław Świerzawski, 90, Polish Roman Catholic prelate, Bishop of Sandomierz (1992–2002).
- Washington SyCip, 96, Filipino accountant, founder of the Asian Institute of Management and SGV & Company.
- Myra Brooks Turner, 81, American composer.
- Joan Zamboni, 83, American ice dancer.

=== 8 ===
- Henedina Abad, 62, Filipino politician, member of the House of Representatives for Batanes (2004–2007, since 2010), cancer.
- Coriún Aharonián, 77, Uruguayan electroacoustic music composer and musicologist.
- Loula Anagnostaki, 88, Greek dramatist.
- László Aradszky, 82, Hungarian pop singer.
- Aldo Biscardi, 86, Italian football broadcaster (Il processo di Biscardi).
- Mike Boland, 62, Canadian ice hockey player (Kansas City Scouts, Buffalo Sabres).
- Gianni Bonagura, 91, Italian actor and voice actor (Sherlock Holmes, In Prison Awaiting Trial).
- Slim Chaker, 56, Tunisian politician, Minister of Youth and Sports (2011), Minister of Finance (2015–2016) and Minister of Public Health (since 2017), heart disease.
- Lee Delano, 86, American actor (The Birdcage).
- Mlondi Dlamini, 20, South African footballer (Maritzburg United), traffic collision.
- Edna Dummerth, 93, American baseball player (All-American Girls Professional Baseball League).
- Darryl Edestrand, 71, Canadian ice hockey player (Pittsburgh Penguins, Boston Bruins, Los Angeles Kings).
- Merrill Heatter, 91, American screenwriter and producer (Hollywood Squares, Wacky Races, Gambit).
- Mark S. Joshi, 48, British mathematician, heart attack.
- Jerry Kleczka, 73, American politician, member of the U.S. House of Representatives for Wisconsin's 4th congressional district (1984–2005).
- Don Lock, 81, American baseball player (Washington Senators, Philadelphia Phillies).
- Gary Lowe, 83, American football player (Detroit Lions, Washington Redskins).
- Michel, 36, Brazilian footballer (SK Slavia Prague), leukemia.
- Beverly Reid O'Connell, 52, American federal judge, U.S. District Court for the Central District of California (2013–2017).
- Grady Tate, 85, American jazz drummer and singer (Schoolhouse Rock!).
- Y. A. Tittle, 90, American football player (Baltimore Colts, San Francisco 49ers, New York Giants).
- Birgitta Ulfsson, 89, Finnish-Swedish actress (Rederiet).

=== 9 ===
- Manuel Busto, 85, French racing cyclist.
- Armando Calderón Sol, 69, Salvadoran politician, President (1994–1999), lung cancer.
- Tony Calvento, 63, Filipino journalist (Calvento Files), multiple organ failure.
- Allan Chumak, 82, Russian faith healer.
- Michel Diefenbacher, 70, French politician.
- Gary Flather, 80, English judge and disability rights campaigner.
- ElizaBeth Gilligan, 55, American fantasy author, cancer.
- Dale Hagerman, 90, American pharmacist, co-founder of Diplomat Pharmacy.
- Roy Hawes, 91, American baseball player (Washington Senators).
- Ben Hawkins, 73, American football player (Philadelphia Eagles).
- Hessie, 81, Cuban-born French-Montenegrin textile artist.
- Gordon S. Kino, 89, Australian-born British-American inventor and electrical engineer.
- Yoji Kondo, 84, Japanese astrophysicist and author.
- Vincent La Selva, 88, American conductor, complications of dementia.
- Robin Ling, 90, British orthopaedic surgeon.
- Rafe Mair, 85, Canadian politician, member of the Legislative Assembly of British Columbia (1975–1981).
- Victor Malu, 70, Nigerian military officer, Chief of Army Staff (1999–2001).
- Mike McQueen, 67, American baseball player (Atlanta Braves, Cincinnati Reds).
- Larry Paul, 65, British boxer.
- Sergei Prigoda, 59, Russian football player (USSR national team) and manager.
- Bill Puterbaugh, 81, American racing driver (USAC).
- M. V. S. Haranatha Rao, 70, Indian playwright and actor, heart attack.
- Jimmy Reid, 81, Scottish footballer (Dundee United).
- Jean Rochefort, 87, French actor (Lost in La Mancha, The Phantom of Liberty, Mr. Bean's Holiday).
- Ralph Salisbury, 91, American poet.
- Robert F. Schoultz, 92, American vice admiral.
- Fernando de Szyszlo, 92, Peruvian painter, sculptor and printmaker.
- József Tóth, 88, Hungarian footballer (Csepel, national team).

=== 10 ===
- Kassim Ahmad, 84, Malaysian writer and politician, lung illness.
- David Chapman, 42, American handball player.
- Cho Jin-ho, 44, South Korean football player (Pohang Atoms, national team) and manager (Daejeon Citizen), heart attack.
- Charles E. Gibson Jr., 91, American lawyer, Attorney General of Vermont (1963–1965).
- Pentti Holappa, 90, Finnish poet and writer.
- A. Daniel O'Neal, 81, American executive.
- Sandra Ruddick, 85, American Olympic artistic gymnast (1956).
- Bob Schiller, 98, American screenwriter (I Love Lucy, All in the Family, The Carol Burnett Show), Emmy winner (1971, 1978).
- Lawrence Spence, 85, English cricketer (Leicestershire).
- Alma Staudinger, 96, Austrian Olympic diver.
- Stack Stevens, 77, English rugby union player.

=== 11 ===
- Emmanuel Borlaza, 81, Filipino film director (Bituing Walang Ningning, Dyesebel, Darna) and writer, heart attack.
- Trevor Byfield, 73, English actor (The Bill, Yesterday’s Dreams, GoldenEye), pneumonia.
- Tom Christie, 90, British Olympic rower.
- Don Pedro Colley, 79, American actor (The Dukes of Hazzard, THX 1138, Beneath the Planet of the Apes), cancer.
- John Fitzallen, 82, Australian football player (Longford).
- James R. Ford, 91, American politician, Mayor of Tallahassee, Florida (1972–1986).
- Chikara Hashimoto, 83, Japanese baseball player and actor (Fist of Fury), lung cancer.
- Dick Hewitt, 74, English footballer (Barnsley, York City).
- Paul Hufnagle, 81, American politician and businessman, Member of Minnesota House of Representatives (1991–1993).
- Sir Clifford Husbands, 91, Barbadian politician and judge, Governor-General (1996–2011).
- Jeremy, 2, British left-coiled snail.
- Gloria Johnson-Powell, 81, American child psychiatrist.
- Lika Kavzharadze, 57, Georgian actress (The Wishing Tree).
- Lawrence H. Keeley, 69, American archaeologist and author (War Before Civilization).
- Karl-Heinz Kipp, 93, Swiss-German billionaire department store and hotel owner.
- Paolo Lunardon, 87, Italian clergyman, Abbot of San Paolo fuori le mura (1997–2005).
- Betty Moczynski, 91, American baseball player (All-American Girls Professional Baseball League).
- Christiane Mora, 78, French politician and historian, MP (1981–1992) and Mayor of Loches (1989–1995).
- Nélio José Nicolai, 77, Brazilian electrotechnician, inventor of Caller ID.
- Shen Zuyan, 82, Chinese physicist.
- Sir Richard Swinburn, 79, British army general, Commander UK Field Army (1994–1995).

=== 12 ===
- Derek Blackburn, 83, Canadian politician, MP for Brant (1971–1993).
- Joan Blos, 89, American author.
- Simon Clarke, 79, English rugby union player (national team).
- Muntaka Connmassie, 71, Nigerian jurist, Supreme Court (2008–2016).
- Margarita D'Amico, 79, Venezuelan journalist and academic.
- Keith Doyle, 92, Australian politician, member of the New South Wales Legislative Assembly for Vaucluse (1965–1978).
- Grape-kun, 21, Japanese Humboldt penguin.
- Bo Holmström, 78, Swedish journalist (SVT, TV4).
- Hu Bo, 29, Chinese novelist and film director, suicide.
- Ed Long, 83, American politician, member of the Oklahoma Senate (1988–1996).
- Andy McGhee, 89, American jazz saxophonist.
- Erwin Moser, 63, Austrian author.
- Vladimír Novák, 69, Czech Olympic judoka.
- Horst Posdorf, 69, German politician, MEP (2005–2009).
- Robert Lynn Pruett, 38, American murderer, execution by lethal injection.
- Glen Richardson, 90, American baseball player (New York Black Yankees).
- Derek Steward, 89, New Zealand sprinter.
- Carlos Visentín, 98, Argentine Olympic water polo player.
- Emmy Werner, 87-88, American developmental psychologist.

=== 13 ===
- Bernd Bonwetsch, 76, German historian, founding director of German Historical Institute Moscow.
- Betty Campbell, 82, Welsh community activist and head teacher.
- Satish Chandra, 94, Indian historian (medieval India).
- Lady Jean Fforde, 96, British aristocrat and codebreaker.
- Pierre Hanon, 80, Belgian footballer (national team, Anderlecht).
- William Lombardy, 79, American chess grandmaster, heart attack.
- Ted Z. Robertson, 96, American judge, Texas Supreme Court justice (1982–1988).
- Iain Rogerson, 56, British actor (Coronation Street), complications from diabetes.
- P. S. Soosaithasan, 83, Sri Lankan politician, MP for Mannar (1977–1983).
- Albert Zafy, 90, Malagasy politician, President (1993–1996), stroke.

=== 14 ===
- Wolfgang Bötsch, 79, German politician, MP (1976–2005) and Federal Minister of Post and Telecommunications (1993–1997).
- Lazhar Bououni, 69, Tunisian politician and professor, Minister of Higher Education and Research (2004–2010) and Justice (2010–2011), President of University of Sousse (1990–1995) and University of Manouba (1991–2001).
- Emmanuel Aboagye Didieye, 40, Ghanaian politician, MP for Afram Plains North (2009–2017).
- Patrick Haslam, 69, British racehorse trainer, motor neurone disease.
- Inside Information, 26, American racehorse.
- Fulgence Werner Le Roy, 93, Belgian-born South African Roman Catholic prelate, Bishop of Polokwane (1988–2000).
- Yambo Ouologuem, 77, Malian writer.
- Lourdes Quisumbing, 96, Filipino politician, Secretary of Education, Culture and Sports (1986–1989).
- Marian Cannon Schlesinger, 105, American artist and author.
- Murray Seeman, 103, American lawyer and politician.
- Marjorie Taylor, Jamaican politician, MP (1993–1997).
- Daniel Webb, 28, American baseball player (Chicago White Sox), ATV collision.
- Richard Wilbur, 96, American poet and literary translator, Pulitzer Prize winner (1957, 1989).

=== 15 ===
- Chinggoy Alonzo, 67, Filipino actor, cancer.
- Dave Bry, 46, American music journalist and editor (Vibe, Spin, The Awl), cancer.
- Deng Ken, 105, Chinese politician and younger brother of former Paramount leader of China Deng Xiaoping.
- Bill Donakowski, 61, American long-distance runner.
- Cathy Elliott, 60, Canadian playwright, actress and composer, traffic collision.
- Choirul Huda, 38, Indonesian footballer (Persela Lamongan), cardiac arrest due to collision with teammate.
- Burrhead Jones, 80, American professional wrestler (WWWF, CCW, CWA).
- Shamsher Khan, 84, Indian Olympic swimmer (1956).
- Boris Lindqvist, 76, Swedish rock singer.
- Peter Lumsden, 88, British racing driver.
- Gonzalo Martínez Corbalá, 89, Mexican politician and diplomat, MP (1964–1967, 1988–1990), Senator (1982–1988), Governor of San Luis Potosí (1991–1992).
- Sir Bert Massie, 68, British disability rights campaigner, Chairman of Disability Rights Commission (2000–2007), cancer.
- Hamish McNeill, 82, Scottish footballer (Colchester United).
- Xavier Johnsai Munyongani, 67, Zimbabwean Roman Catholic prelate, Bishop of Gweru (since 2013).
- Miloš Radulović, 88, Montenegrin politician, President of Yugoslavia (1993).
- Alison Robins, 97, British military communications listener (Y-stations).
- Rose Schwarz, 82, German missionary.
- Hernán Silva, 68, Chilean football referee.
- Herbert Suchiang, 86, Indian politician, cardiac arrest.
- János Szabó, 72, Hungarian Olympic runner.
- Lekh Tandon, 88, Indian film director (Professor, Ek Baar Kaho, Amrapali) and actor (Swades, Chennai Express).
- Serge Thion, 75, French sociologist and Holocaust denier, member of French National Center for Scientific Research (1971–2000).
- William Turnage, 74, American conservationist, business manager of Ansel Adams, cancer.
- Wayne Velicer, 73, American psychologist.

=== 16 ===
- Hernán Agote, 80, Argentine Olympic bobsledder.
- John Andreason, 88, American politician, member of the Idaho Senate (1995–2012), liver cancer.
- D. J. Bartholomew, 86, British statistician.
- Glen Bonner, 65, American football player (San Diego Chargers).
- Kevin Cadle, 62, American-born British basketball coach (Kingston Kings, British national team) and presenter (Sky Sports).
- Daphne Caruana Galizia, 53, Maltese blogger and journalist (Panama Papers), car bomb.
- Dharmakkan Dhanaraj, 67, Indian Christian theologian.
- Roy Dotrice, 94, British actor (Amadeus, A Moon for the Misbegotten, Game of Thrones), Tony winner (2000).
- John Dunsworth, 71, Canadian actor (Trailer Park Boys, Haven, The Shipping News), complications from thrombotic thrombocytopenic purpura.
- Fedor Glushchenko, 73, Russian conductor and violinist.
- Isnilon Hapilon, 51, Filipino Islamist militant (MNLF, Al-Qaeda, Abu Sayyaf), shot.
- Sean Hughes, 51, Irish comedian (Never Mind the Buzzcocks, Sean's Show) and actor (The Last Detective), cirrhosis.
- Koichi Kishi, 77, Japanese politician, Mayor of Kaneyama (1971–1998) and member of the House of Councillors (1998–2016).
- Ma Lin, 92, Hong Kong biochemist, Vice-Chancellor of the Chinese University of Hong Kong (1978–1987).
- Omar Maute, 37, Filipino Islamist militant (Maute group), shot.
- Ajmal Mian, 83, Pakistani jurist, Chief Justice (1997–1999).
- David Pettifor, 72, British metallurgist.
- Marvin Rodríguez, 82, Costa Rican football player and coach (national team, C.S.D. Municipal, Saprissa).
- Phillip V. Sanchez, 88, American diplomat, ambassador to Honduras (1973–1976) and Colombia (1976–1977).
- Iain Shedden, 60, Scottish-Australian musician (The Saints) and journalist (The Australian), laryngeal cancer.
- Anthony Simonds-Gooding, 80, Irish executive.
- Heather Slade-Lipkin, 70, English pianist, harpsichordist and music teacher.
- Harriette Thompson, 94, American pianist.
- Yan Shunkai, 80, Chinese comedian, actor (The True Story of Ah Q) and film director.

=== 17 ===
- Ed Barnowski, 74, American baseball player (Baltimore Orioles).
- Ian Baxter, 80, British army officer.
- Robert Butow, 93, American historian.
- John Crosby Jr., 66, American Olympic gymnast.
- Danielle Darrieux, 100, French actress (The Young Girls of Rochefort, Persepolis, The Earrings of Madame de...) and singer, complications from a fall.
- Gord Downie, 53, Canadian musician (The Tragically Hip) and activist (Lake Ontario Waterkeeper, residential school reconciliation), glioblastoma.
- Mychael Knight, 39, American fashion designer (Project Runway).
- Ryszard Kowalczyk, 80, Polish scientist and Soviet dissident.
- Ingvar Lidholm, 96, Swedish composer.
- Michele Marsh, 63, American television journalist, breast cancer.
- Giuseppe Massa, 69, Italian footballer (Inter Milan, S.S.C. Napoli).
- Julian May, 86, American science fiction writer (The Many-Colored Land).
- Dick Morley, 84, American electrical engineer, inventor of the programmable logic controller.
- Dunc Rousseau, 72, Canadian ice hockey player (Winnipeg Jets), cancer.
- Harry Stradling Jr., 92, American cinematographer (The Way We Were, Micki + Maude, 1776).
- Douglas H. Thayer, 88, American author.
- Baron von Lind, 79, American painter.
- Erik Wesdorp, 70, Dutch Olympic rower.
- Donald A. Yates, 87, American writer and translator.

=== 18 ===
- Gregory Baum, 94, Canadian theologian.
- Brent Briscoe, 56, American actor (Twin Peaks, A Simple Plan, Sling Blade) and screenwriter, complications from a fall.
- Eamonn Campbell, 70, Irish musician (The Dubliners).
- Arlie F. Culp, 91, American politician.
- Helen DeVos, 90, American philanthropist (Helen DeVos Children's Hospital), stroke complications.
- Jerry Helluin, 88, American football player (Green Bay Packers, Cleveland Browns).
- Phil Miller, 68, English guitarist, cancer.
- Dorothy Morrison, 98, American child actress (The Champeen, Seein' Things, Isn't Life Terrible?).
- Taizo Nishimuro, 81, Japanese businessman (Japan Post Holdings, Toshiba, Tokyo Stock Exchange).
- Eva Paulusová-Benešová, 80, Czech Olympic cross-country skier.
- Marino Perani, 77, Italian football manager and player (Bologna, national team).
- John Phillips, 83, English cricketer (Kent).
- Sir Christopher Pitchford, 70, British jurist, Lord Justice of Appeal (2010–2017), motor neurone disease.
- Unity Spencer, 87, British artist.
- Ricardo Vidal, 86, Filipino Roman Catholic prelate and cardinal, Archbishop of Lipa (1973–1981) and Cebu (1981–2010), President of the Catholic Bishops' Conference (1986–1987), sepsis.
- Ram Singh Yadav, 74, Indian politician, heart attack.
- Yeoh Tiong Lay, 87, Malaysian businessman (YTL).
- Issam Zahreddine, 56, Syrian Republican Guard major general (Siege of Deir ez-Zor), landmine explosion.

=== 19 ===
- Jeanne Brousse, 96, French resistance member.
- Edmund Cotter, 90, New Zealand mountaineer.
- Dick DiBiaso, 76, American college basketball coach (Stanford).
- Ken Gowers, 81, English rugby league player (Swinton, Great Britain).
- David E. Gratz, 90, American engineer.
- Calvin Hultman, 76, American politician, member of the Iowa Senate (1973–1991).
- Willie Lee, 67, American football player (Kansas City Chiefs), heart attack.
- Umberto Lenzi, 86, Italian film director (Cannibal Ferox, Nightmare City, Eaten Alive!).
- Miguel Ángel Loayza, 77, Peruvian football player (FC Barcelona, Boca Juniors, Deportivo Cali).
- Castor Paul Msemwa, 62, Tanzanian Roman Catholic prelate, Bishop of Tunduru-Masasi (since 2005).
- Manuel de Oliveira, 76, Portuguese Olympic long-distance runner (1960, 1964, 1968).
- Michael Pitfield, 80, Canadian politician, Clerk of the Privy Council (1975–1979, 1980–1982) and Senator (1982–2010), Parkinson's disease.
- Brian Riley, 80, English footballer (Bolton Wanderers).
- Lewis Arthur Tambs, 90, American diplomat.

=== 20 ===
- Fay Chiang, 65, American poet, complications from cancer.
- Amal Datta, 84, Indian politician.
- Ugo Fangareggi, 79, Italian actor (For Love and Gold), voice actor and comedian, Parkinson's disease.
- Rudolf Gorenflo, 87, German mathematician.
- Stan Kowalski, 91, American professional wrestler (AWA, NWA Tri-State, Stampede Wrestling).
- Federico Luppi, 81, Argentine-Spanish actor (Nobody Will Speak of Us When We're Dead, Pan's Labyrinth, Men with Guns).
- Russell Mawby, 89, American businessman, CEO of W. K. Kellogg Foundation (1970–1996).
- Judith McGrath, 70, Australian actress (Prisoner, A Country Practice, All Saints).
- Dick Noel, 90, American band singer ("Count Every Star").
- Justin Reed, 35, American basketball player (Ole Miss Rebels, Boston Celtics, Minnesota Timberwolves), angiosarcoma.
- Betty Bone Schiess, 94, American Episcopal priest.
- Roland Ströhm, 89, Swedish Olympic cyclist.
- Mustapha Tlili, 80, Tunisian novelist.
- Thuravoor Viswambharan, 74, Indian Vedic scholar and writer.

=== 21 ===
- Martin Eric Ain, 50, American-born Swiss bassist (Hellhammer, Celtic Frost) and entrepreneur, heart attack.
- Donald Bain, 82, American writer (Coffee, Tea or Me?), heart failure.
- Rosaura Barahona, 75, Mexican journalist and feminist writer, pulmonary disease.
- Denise P. Barlow, 67, British geneticist.
- Kazimierz Chodakowski, 88, Polish Olympic ice hockey player (1952, 1956), (ŁKS Łódź).
- Chuck Churn, 87, American baseball player (Pittsburgh Pirates, Cleveland Indians, Los Angeles Dodgers).
- Emilio D'Amore, 101, Italian politician, Deputy (1948–1958, 1963–1968).
- Robert Getchell, 81, American screenwriter (Alice Doesn't Live Here Anymore, Bound for Glory, The Client).
- Audrey Hancock, 98, British Olympic swimmer (1936).
- Nol Hendriks, 80, Dutch businessman and football executive (Roda JC), brain hemorrhage.
- Rosemary Leach, 81, English actress (A Room with a View, The Roads to Freedom, The Plague Dogs).
- Dave Leech, 90, New Zealand hammer thrower.
- John Morrow, 84, American football player (Cleveland Browns, Los Angeles Rams).
- Lech Ordon, 88, Polish actor (Letters to Santa).
- Max Pfister, 85, Swiss linguist.
- Juan de Dios Pueblos, 74, Filipino Roman Catholic prelate, Bishop of Kidapawan (1987–1995) and Butuan (since 1995).
- Herb Raybourn, 82, American baseball scout (New York Yankees).
- Pat Shovelin, 41, Irish Gaelic football coach (Donegal), cancer.
- Gilbert Stork, 95, American chemist.
- Herbert Strabel, 90, German art director (Cabaret, The NeverEnding Story, Enemy Mine), Oscar winner (1973).
- Tom van Vollenhoven, 82, South African rugby union (national team) and rugby league player (St Helens).

=== 22 ===
- Piergiuseppe D'Andreamatteo, 73, Italian politician, Deputy (1992–1994).
- G. N. Georgano, 85, British author.
- Christopher Grant, 81, English cricketer (Nottinghamshire).
- Atle Hammer, 85, Norwegian jazz musician.
- Al Hurricane, 81, American singer and songwriter, complications from prostate cancer.
- Emu Lehtinen, 70, Finnish record dealer, leukemia.
- Patricia Llewellyn, 55, British television producer (The Naked Chef, Ramsay's Kitchen Nightmares), BAFTA (2001, 2005, 2008) and Emmy winner (2006), breast cancer.
- Baldo Marro, 69, Filipino actor and director.
- Fred Miller, 86, American football player (Washington Redskins, Hamilton Tiger-Cats, BC Lions).
- Ram Mukherjee, 84, Indian film director (Hum Hindustani, Ek Bar Mooskura Do, Leader).
- Peadar O'Loughlin, 87, Irish musician.
- Darrell Osteen, 74, American baseball player (Cincinnati Reds, Oakland Athletics).
- Fernand Picot, 87, French racing cyclist.
- Scott Putesky, 49, American guitarist (Marilyn Manson), colon cancer.
- Walter Babington Thomas, 98, New Zealand-born British army officer, GOC Far East Land Forces (1970–1971).
- Geraldo João Paulo Roger Verdier, 80, French-born Brazilian Roman Catholic prelate, Bishop of Guajará-Mirim (1980–2011), hemorrhagic stroke.
- Chuck Weber, 87, American football player (Cleveland Browns, Philadelphia Eagles).
- Paul J. Weitz, 85, American astronaut (Skylab 2, STS-6), myelodysplastic syndrome.
- George Young, 70, Scottish-born Australian musician (The Easybeats), songwriter ("Friday on My Mind", "Love Is in the Air"), and producer (AC/DC).

=== 23 ===
- Alinghi, 16, Australian racehorse, foaling complications.
- Corrado Böhm, 94, Italian computer scientist.
- Joe Corcoran, 77, Irish Gaelic football player (Mayo GAA).
- Reinhold Durnthaler, 74, Austrian bobsledder, world champion (1967), Olympic silver medallist (1964, 1968).
- Pyotr Gorelikov, 85, Russian Olympic sailor.
- Gordon A. Haaland, 77, American academic.
- Anthony Hallam, 83, British geologist.
- Mila Hernando, 60, Spanish diplomat, Ambassador to Lebanon (2012–2017), cancer.
- Athanassios Kalogiannis, 52, Greek Olympic hurdler (1984, 1992) and fashion photographer, pulmonary edema.
- Walter Lassally, 90, German-born British-Greek cinematographer (Zorba the Greek, Oedipus the King, Tom Jones), Oscar winner (1965).
- John Mattock, 91, British rose grower.
- John McCracken, 79, British historian.
- Joyce McLaughlin, 78, American mathematician.
- Hamid Ali Mirza, 77, Pakistani judge.
- Mary Nissenson, 65, American television journalist, septic shock.
- Gordon Ogilvie, 83, New Zealand historian (Canterbury region) and biographer (Richard Pearse, Denis Glover).
- Iona Opie, 94, British folklorist.
- Bob Richardson, 72, American politician.
- Mari Lyn Salvador, 74, American anthropologist and museum director (San Diego Museum of Man, Hearst Museum).
- Charles Sims, 80, American mathematician.
- Zenon Ważny, 87, Polish Olympic pole vaulter (1956).

=== 24 ===
- M. K. Anwar, 84, Bangladeshi politician, Minister of Agriculture (2001–2006).
- Ebrahim Ashtiani, 75, Iranian footballer (Persepolis, national team), heart disease.
- Sir Peter Bairsto, 91, British air marshal, Deputy Commander in Chief Strike Command (1981–1984).
- Glenn Barr, 75, Northern Irish politician (UDA) and advocate, member of Northern Ireland Assembly and Constitutional Convention.
- Amal Bayou, 58–60, Libyan microbiologist and politician, member of the House of Representatives.
- Inga Borg, 92, Swedish writer (Plupp).
- Willie Chan, 76, Malaysian-born Hong Kong film producer and talent manager (Jackie Chan, Edison Chen).
- Ingetraut Dahlberg, 90, German information scientist and philosopher, developer of Information Coding Classification.
- Girija Devi, 88, Indian thumri singer, Padma Vibhushan (2016), cardiac arrest.
- Fats Domino, 89, American Hall of Fame pianist and singer-songwriter ("Blueberry Hill", "Ain't That a Shame", "I'm Walkin'").
- Michael Patrick Driscoll, 78, American Roman Catholic prelate, Bishop of Boise (1999–2014).
- Alan Eddy, 90, British biochemist.
- Fu Quanxiang, 94, Chinese Yue opera actress.
- Tony Garrett, 99, British executive, chairman of Imperial Tobacco (1973-1979).
- Virginia Grant, 80, Canadian Olympic swimmer.
- Robert Guillaume, 89, American actor (Benson, The Lion King, Sports Night), Emmy winner (1979, 1985), prostate cancer.
- Clayton Howard, 83, British make-up artist.
- Sana Iqbal, 29, Indian cross-country cyclist and anti-suicide activist, traffic collision.
- Jane Juska, 84, American writer.
- Brady Keys, 81, American football player (Pittsburgh Steelers, Minnesota Vikings, St. Louis Cardinals) and businessman.
- Otto Kraus, 87, German arachnologist and myriapodologist.
- Eric Kipping, 92, Canadian politician.
- Andrew W. Lewis, 74, American medievalist.
- Peter Lötscher, 76, Swiss Olympic fencer.
- Sallie Morton, 91, American jeweler, mesothelioma.
- Brendan O'Kelly, 89, Irish Olympic footballer.
- Michael Proctor, 88, English botanist.
- Isabel Quintanilla, 79, Spanish visual artist.
- I. V. Sasi, 69, Indian film director (Devasuram), heart attack.
- Mahama Sawadogo, 63, Burkinabé politician, High Commissioner of Kadiogo Province (1984–1986) and member of the National Assembly (since 1992).

=== 25 ===
- Mohamed Abshir Muse, 91, Somali military officer, commander of Somali Police Force (1960–1969) and leader of SSDF (1991–1998).
- Jack Bannon, 77, American actor (Lou Grant, Petticoat Junction, Little Big Man).
- Robert Blakeley, 95, American graphic designer (fallout shelter sign).
- Vilnis Edvīns Bresis, 79, Latvian politician, Chairman of the Council of Ministers of the Latvian SSR (1988–1990).
- Ronald Breslow, 86, American chemist and professor (Columbia University), cancer.
- Roger Bullen, 83, Australian rules footballer (Geelong).
- Ian Cathie, 85, Australian politician, Victorian MLA (1976–1988).
- Maud Linder, 93, French journalist, film historian and documentary film director.
- Lu Guanqiu, 72, Chinese billionaire automotive manufacturer, chairman and co-founder of Wanxiang.
- Peter MacGregor-Scott, 69, British film producer (Batman Forever, The Fugitive, Still Smokin), injuries sustained in traffic collision.
- Joseph Mahn Erie, 92, Myanmar Roman Catholic prelate, Bishop of Bassein (1968–1982).
- Sir John Manduell, 89, South African-born British composer and educator (Royal Northern College of Music).
- John Mollo, 86, British costume designer (Star Wars, Alien, Gandhi), Oscar winner (1978, 1983), vascular dementia.
- Donnchadh Ó Corráin, 75, Irish historian (vikings, Medieval ages, Hiberno-Normans).
- Pinito del Oro, 86, Spanish trapeze artist (Ringling Bros. and Barnum & Bailey Circus).
- Ross Powell, 49, American baseball player (Cincinnati Reds, Houston Astros, Pittsburgh Pirates), carbon monoxide poisoning.
- Gas Ronda, 91, American drag racer.
- Ben Shephard, 69, English historian and writer.
- Vincent Warren, 79, American-Canadian dance historian and lecturer.
- Jim Welch, 79, American football player (Baltimore Colts).

=== 26 ===
- Ali Ashraf Darvishian, 76, Iranian writer and democracy activist.
- Awurama Badu, 72, Ghanaian highlife musician.
- George Conzemius, 81, American politician, member of the Minnesota Senate (1967-1977).
- Fred Ray Dorsey, 87, American politician.
- Simon Fitzmaurice, 43, Irish filmmaker, motor neurone disease.
- André Gauthier, 82, Canadian monument sculptor and designer.
- Arnett Girardeau, 88, American politician, member of the Florida House of Representatives (1976–1982) and Senate (1983–1992).
- Juliette, 91, Canadian singer and television host.
- Sir Gavin Laird, 84, Scottish trade unionist.
- Ian McLeod, 63, South African football referee.
- Shea Norman, 45, American gospel singer, diabetes.
- Nelly Olin, 76, French politician, Mayor of Garges-lès-Gonesse and Senator (1995–2004), Minister of Environment (2005–2007).
- Linda Richardson, 62, American judoka.
- Barry Roberts, 84, Australian rugby union player (Manly RUFC).
- Richard M. Ryckman, 80, American psychologist.
- Sir Reginald Secondé, 95, British diplomat, Ambassador to Chile, Romania and Venezuela.
- Thomas Smales, 83, English rugby league player (national team) and coach (Castleford Tigers, Featherstone Rovers).
- Geoff Tootill, 95, British computer scientist.
- Abdul Karim Telgi, 56, Indian forger.
- Stephen Toulouse, 45, American policy specialist and public relations manager (Microsoft, Xbox Live), abdominal hemorrhage.

=== 27 ===
- Roger Carpenter, 72, English neurophysiologist.
- Lewis Golden, 94, English army officer and executive (Everest Home Improvement).
- Hans Kraay Sr., 81, Dutch football player (DOS) and manager (Feyenoord).
- Ladislav Kubík, 71, Czech-born American composer.
- Punathil Kunjabdulla, 77, Indian writer (Smarakasilakal).
- Dieter Kurrat, 75, German football player and manager (Borussia Dortmund).
- Peter Lawrenson, 84, British electrical engineer.
- Cecil Moss, 92, South African rugby union player (national team).
- Patrick Nagatani, 72, American photographer.
- David Reid, 84, Australian politician, member of the Western Australian Legislative Assembly for Blackwood (1971–1972), Senator for Western Australia (1974).
- David Shedden, 73, Scottish rugby union player (national team).
- Digamber Singh, 66, Indian politician, cancer.
- Abdoulaye Soulama, 37, Burkinabé footballer (ASFA Yennenga, Denizlispor, national team).
- Deon Stewardson, 66, South African actor (Wild at Heart), suicide.
- Inkululeko Suntele, 23, Lesothan Olympic boxer, stabbed.
- Katalin Szőke, 82, Hungarian swimmer, Olympic champion (1952).
- Joe Taub, 88, American business executive (Automatic Data Processing) and co-owner of the New Jersey Nets.
- David Vaughan, 93, American dance historian, complications from prostate cancer.
- Göran Witting, 92, Swedish Olympic sailor.

=== 28 ===
- Yvonne Baseden, 95, French-born British Special Operations Executive agent.
- Ronald Getoor, 88, American mathematician.
- Mary Kenner, 83, Canadian figure skater.
- Josaphat-Robert Large, 74, Haitian-American poet, novelist and art critic, Prix littéraire des Caraïbes (2003).
- Roger Lockyer, 89, British historian.
- Al Oster, 92, Canadian folk singer.
- Leif Ottersen, 88, Norwegian Lutheran priest.
- Mitchell Peters, 82, American timpanist.
- Bernard Roy, 83, French mathematician.
- Manuel Sanchís Martínez, 79, Spanish footballer (national team, Real Madrid).
- Willy Schroeders, 84, Belgian racing cyclist.
- Gaetano De Vescovi, 79, Italian Olympic wrestler.

=== 29 ===
- Muhal Richard Abrams, 87, American jazz pianist.
- Cecil Austen, 98, Australian cricketer and football player.
- Dennis Banks, 80, American indigenous activist and actor (Thunderheart, The Last of the Mohicans), co-founder of American Indian Movement, complications from heart surgery.
- Thelma Boughner, 99, Canadian Olympic diver (1936).
- Keith Briffa, 64, British climatologist, cancer.
- Richard E. Cavazos, 88, American army general, Commanding General of FORSCOM (1982–1984), Alzheimer's disease.
- Claude Dulong, 95, French historian.
- Metin Ersoy, 83, Turkish singer.
- Roly Green, 90, New Zealand rugby union player (South Canterbury).
- Richard Hambleton, 65, Canadian street artist, cancer.
- Frank Holder, 92, Guyanese jazz singer and percussionist.
- Władysław Kowalski, 81, Polish actor.
- Steve Landen, 64, American bridge player, hypothermia.
- Tony Madigan, 87, Australian boxer and rugby union player, Olympic bronze medalist (1960).
- Clay McShane, 73, American historian.
- Billy Mize, 88, American steel guitarist, band leader and vocalist.
- Herbert Morawetz, 102, Czech-born American chemical engineer.
- Didier Motchane, 86, French politician, MEP (1979–1989), cancer.
- Manfredi Nicoletti, 87, Italian architect (Helicoidal Skyscraper, Airport of Catania, Kazakhstan Central Concert Hall).
- Linda Nochlin, 86, American art historian.
- Juanita Quigley, 86, American child actress.
- Atluri Purnachandra Rao, 92, Indian film producer (Venky).
- Al Richter, 90, American baseball player (Boston Red Sox).
- Peter Schutz, 87, German-born American businessman (Porsche), Alzheimer's disease.
- Sir Ninian Stephen, 94, Australian judge, Governor-General (1982–1989), Justice of the High Court (1972–1982).
- Daniel Te'o-Nesheim, 30, American Samoan football player (Philadelphia Eagles, Tampa Bay Buccaneers).

=== 30 ===
- Candy Atherton, 62, British politician, MP for Falmouth and Camborne (1997–2005).
- Fred Beckey, 94, American rock climber, mountaineer and author.
- Algimantas Butnorius, 70, Lithuanian chess Grandmaster (2007) and World Senior Champion (2007).
- Frank Doran, 68, British politician, MP for Aberdeen South (1987–1992) and Aberdeen North (1997–2015).
- János Halász, 88, Hungarian Olympic basketball player (1948).
- Kim Joo-hyuk, 45, South Korean actor (The Servant, My Wife Got Married, Confidential Assignment), traffic collision.
- Cornelius Korir, 67, Kenyan Roman Catholic prelate, Bishop of Eldoret (since 1990).
- James D. Martin, 99, American politician, member of the U.S. House of Representatives for Alabama's 7th congressional district (1965–1967).
- Judy Martz, 74, American politician, Governor of Montana (2001–2005), Olympic speed skater (1964), pancreatic cancer.
- Salvador Minuchin, 96, Argentine-American psychotherapist, developer of structural family therapy, heart disease.
- Eugène Parlier, 88, Swiss footballer (Servette, Urania Genève Sport, Biel-Bienne).
- Melanmai Ponnusamy, 66, Indian writer, heart attack.
- Mary Reveley, 77, British racehorse trainer.
- M. V. Sridhar, 51, Indian cricketer (Hyderabad), heart attack.
- Daniel Viglietti, 78, Uruguayan folk singer, guitarist, composer and political activist.
- Abbas Zandi, 87, Iranian Olympic freestyle wrestler (1948, 1952, 1956) and World champion (1954).

=== 31 ===
- Wolfgang Achtner, 60, German theologian, heart attack.
- Weston Bate, 93, Australian historian.
- William A. V. Cecil, 89, American businessman (The Biltmore Company).
- Mircea Drăgan, 85, Romanian film director (Setea, Lupeni 29, Explosion).
- Rolly Goldring, 80, Canadian Olympic basketball player.
- Norman Hardie, 92, New Zealand mountaineer.
- Fanya Heller, 93, Ukrainian-born American Holocaust survivor and author.
- Howard L. Kennedy, 89, American politician.
- Myron P. Lotto, 92, American politician, member of the Wisconsin Senate (1969-1973).
- Elaine Mazlish, 92, American author.
- Terry McCashin, 73, New Zealand businessman (McCashin's Brewery) and rugby union player (national team, Wellington).
- Clare McLaren-Throckmorton, 82, British barrister.
- Red Murrell, 84, American basketball player (Drake University), heart disease.
- Mario das Neves, 66, Argentine politician, Governor of Chubut (2003–2011, since 2015).
- Papi Oviedo, 79, Cuban tresero.
- Derek Robinson, 90, British trade unionist.
- Stefano Salvatori, 49, Italian footballer (Milan, Fiorentina), cancer.
- Colin Simpson, 86, English journalist and author.
- Bob Talbot, 89, American baseball player (Chicago Cubs).
- James A. Williams, 85, American lieutenant general.
- Abubakari Yakubu, 35, Ghanaian footballer (Ajax, Vitesse, national team).
