= Mele (surname) =

Mele or Melé or Mélé is a surname, and may refer to:

- Alfred Mele (born 1951), American philosopher
- Alessandra Mele (born 2002), Norwegian-Italian singer
- Alphonse van Mele (1891–1972), Belgian artistic gymnast
- Antonio Mele (born 1967), Italian economist
- Casandra Stark Mele, professional name Casandra Stark, American film director
- Claudio Mele (born 1968), Argentine footballer
- Cosimo Mele (1957–2017), Italian politician
- David Mélé (born 1985), French rugby union player and coach
- Domenico Antonio Mele (born 1647), Italian physician and poet
- Dutch Mele (1915–1975), American baseball player
- Elisa Mele (born 1996), Italian footballer
- Eugene J. Mele, American physicist
- Gian Paolo Mele (1944–2018), Italian conductor, composer and musicologist
- Jillian Mele (born 1982), American news anchor and reporter
- Joe Mele (born 1998), American online personality
- Juan Melé (1923–2012, Argentine sculptor, painter and art critic
- Liliana Mele, Italian-Ethiopian actress and model
- Luigi Mele (1937–2023), Italian cyclist
- Mohammed Laminu Mele, Nigerian academic
- Nicco Mele (born 1977), Ghanaian-American writer
- Nicholas Mele, American actor
- Sam Mele (1922–2017), American baseball player and manager
- Santiago Mele (born 1997), Uruguayan footballer

== See also ==
- Mela (surname)
