= Howard Kennedy =

Howard Kennedy may refer to:

- Howard Kennedy (Canadian Army officer) (1892–1967), Canadian official of the United Nations
- Howard Angus Kennedy (1861–1938), British-born Canadian journalist and historian
- Howard L. Kennedy (1928–2017), member of the South Dakota House of Representatives
