= Lynn Lewis =

Lynn Lewis may refer to:

- Lynn Lewis (judoka), American judoka
- Lynn Lewis (tennis) (born 1963), American tennis player
