= Evelyn Buckwar =

German mathematician

Evelyn Buckwar is a German mathematician specializing in stochastic differential equations. She is Professor for Stochastics at the Johannes Kepler University Linz in Austria.

== Education ==
Buckwar earned a diploma in mathematics in 1992 from the Free University of Berlin, and completed her doctorate there in 1997. Her dissertation, Iterative Approximation of the Positive Solutions of a Class of Nonlinear Volterra-type Integral Equations, was supervised by Rudolf Gorenflo.

== Career ==
After working as a Marie Curie Fellow at the University of Manchester and then as a researcher at the Humboldt University of Berlin, where she completed a habilitation in 2005, she became a visiting professor at Otto von Guericke University Magdeburg and Technische Universität Berlin before becoming a lecturer at Heriot-Watt University in 2007. She took her present position at the Johannes Kepler University Linz in 2011.
