= Phil Hagerman =

American entrepreneur, philanthropist and pharmacist

- Occupations: pharmacist and businessman
- Known for: co-founder of Diplomat Pharmacy
- Children: 4
- Parent(s): Dale Hagerman & Jan Hagerman

Phil Hagerman is an American entrepreneur, philanthropist, pharmacist and former CEO and chairman of Diplomat Pharmacy, Inc. Diplomat was the largest independent provider of specialty pharmacy services in the United States until its sale to Optum/United Health in February 2020 He co-founded Diplomat Pharmacy, Inc. in 1975 with his father, Dale Hagerman, and its stock was sold on the New York Stock Exchange (NYSE) starting in October 2014.

Hagerman is co-founder of the Hagerman Foundation, a non-profit organization dedicated to philanthropic efforts across Michigan in the areas of family, community, and education.

In 2013, Hagerman founded SkyPoint Ventures, a real estate and venture investment firm headquartered in Flint, Michigan. SkyPoint Ventures focuses on early stage companies in multiple disciplines and engaging the entrepreneurial spirit while developing industry leading processes and technology. They are headquartered in the historic Dryden Building in Downtown Flint. Built in 1901, the Dryden building was home to the original offices of General Motors formed in by Billy Durant in 1908.

Hagerman is CEO of Forum Health Enterprises, Inc. Forum Health, founded in February 2019, focuses on building a network of integrative and functional medical practices across the nation and includes a nutraceutical division, Inwell Biosciences and a technology division, Power2Practice. Inwell has created a line of proprietary supplements specific to the needs of physicians in integrative and functional medicine. Power2Practice is an EMR and practice management software system created specifically for integrative medical practices, used by over 1000 practitioners nationwide.

== Philanthropy ==
=== Education and training philanthropy ===
In February, 2015, through the Hagerman Foundation, Hagerman donated $5 million to the Ferris State University College of Pharmacy to redevelop the Pharmacy Building and to support student scholarships and an endowed chair for health informatics. He is involved with funding many nonprofits in Flint, Fenton and throughout Genesee County, looking to improve the lives of future generations. In 2015, he gave a $2 million endowment gift to the University of Michigan-Flint to create The Hagerman Center for Entrepreneurship and Innovation. In addition to funding a new center, the gift also created the Hagerman Scholars program, a program designed to nurture and cultivate entrepreneurial leaders in Flint.

In 2016, Hagerman donated $120,000 through the Hagerman Foundation to Grand Circus's Develop(her) Bootcamp. Designed to promote diversity in tech, the intensive programming course offered free tuition, exclusively for women in Flint and Detroit.

In recognition of his commitment to philanthropy in education, Hagerman and his wife, Jocelyn received The State Bank Contribution to Education Award in 2016 for their work in Fenton, Michigan.

=== Community philanthropy ===
Hagerman has also supported more community and family focused organizations and events. He is involved with funding many nonprofits in Flint, Fenton and throughout Genesee County, looking to improve the lives of future generations.

Additionally, he partners with and supports Carriage Town Ministries, a clinic serving underserved and homeless residents of Flint, Michigan with free health, eye and dental screenings.

=== Community renovations ===
Hagerman is particularly committed revitalizing the downtown areas of Flint and Fenton. He has been active in partnering with Kettering University and the University of Michigan-Flint to reopen a historic ice rink in the heart of downtown Flint. Additionally, he has invested $4 million in the Capitol Theatre renovation project.

Through Skypoint Ventures, two of Flints most Iconic buildings, the Dryden Building and the Ferris Furs Building were rehabilitated and put back in use. The Ferris building had been dark for 36 years when it reopened in November 2017, with 30 small businesses moving in to its 7 floors. The Ferris building was renamed the Ferris Wheel, and is a coworking and innovation space, and home of the Not-for-Profit 100K ideas, created by Skypoint in 2017. 100K is an Innovation center and incubator created to relieve the innovator of the entrepreneurial burden.

== Personal life ==
Phil has four children. He is an avid snowskier and loves the mountains and oceans.
