= General Baxter =

General Baxter may refer to:

- Henry Baxter (1821–1873), Union Army brevet major general
- Horace Henry Baxter (1818–1884), Vermont Militia Adjutant General in the American Civil War
- Ian Baxter (1937–2017), British Army major general
- Jedediah Hyde Baxter (1837–1890), U.S. Army brigadier general
