= Donald "Duck" Richardson =

- Born: Donald H. Richardson; September 16, 1935; Lizella, Georgia, US
- Died: September 4, 2011 (aged 75); Macon, Georgia, US
- Other name: "Duck"
- Occupation: High school basketball coach
- Spouse: Jacquelyn Richardson
- Children: 4

Donald H. "Duck" Richardson, Sr. (September 16, 1935 – September 4, 2011) was an American boys' basketball coach at Southwest Magnet High School in Macon, Georgia from 1971 to 1990. During that period, he coached future NBA players Jeff Malone, Ivano Newbill, Norm Nixon, and Sharone Wright. He also coached several players who went on to play Division I college basketball, such as Eric Manuel. A total of 92 Southwest players were awarded collegiate athletic scholarships during his tenure.

His career achievements included a 463–90 record (83.7 winning percentage), which set a school record for number of wins. Richardson led Southwest to fifteen subregional championships, ten regional championships, six state championships, and one national championship (1979). Under his management, Southwest boys' basketball teams never had a losing season.

Coach Richardson was the husband of Jacquelyn Richardson. Together they raised four children: three sons, Stan Richardson, Don Z. Richardson, Donald H. Richardson Jr.; and a daughter, Linda Richardson.

Prior to Richardson's death, Southwest High School's gymnasium basketball court was named in his honor.

== Awards ==
- National coach of the Year: 1979
- State of Georgia Coach of the Year
- Region Coach of the Year
- Middle Georgia Coach of the Year
- Head coach of the All American Team in the Dapper Dan Basketball Classic
- Steve Schmidt Award
- Georgia Sports Hall of Fame inductee: 2007
