= Muntaka Connmassie =

Nigerian jurist (19446–2017)

Justice of the Supreme Court of Nigeria

Personal details
- Born: February 10, 1946 Kaduna State, Nigeria
- Died: October 12, 2017 (aged 71)
- Party: Non partisian

Muntaka Connmassie, CON (10 February 1946 – 12 October 2017) was a Nigerian jurist and Justice of the Supreme Court of Nigeria.

Justice Muntaka Connmassie initially trained as a teacher, prior to joining the legal profession; He taught Arabic and English in both Kaduna and Zaria States, retiring from the teaching profession as the principal of Provincial Arabic School in Fada, Zaria State, after a decade spent in the profession.

He obtained his law degree (LL.B) in 1976, and was called to bar, after having attended the Nigerian Law School, Lagos in 1977.

He was a state counsel for the Ministry of Justice in Kwara State (1977 to 1978), and Kaduna State (1978). Between 1978 and 1988, he was with the High court (in Kaduna) in various capacities; initially as an associate magistrate and then as a senior magistrate, chief magistrate, deputy chief registrar, and finally as the chief registrar.

Prior to joining the Supreme Court of Nigeria in 2008, he was a Judge at the Court of Appeal, serving in Port Harcourt, Jos, Abuja, Ilorin, and Benin divisions.

He was awarded with the Time News Magazine Nigeria merit award in 2006; He was on national assignment as a member of the Karibi Whyte Disturbance Tribunal Abuja (1986-1987).

The Hon. Justice Muntaka Connmassie attended several workshops and seminars on sharia, and other aspects of law. He was a member of the Nigerian Body of Benchers.

He was married and had children.

== See also ==
- List of Justice of the Nigerian courts of appeals

== Membership ==
- Member, Nigerian Bar Association
- Member, International Bar Association
- Member, Nigerian Body of Benchers
