= David Dolbin =

American football player and coach (1932–2017)

Biographical details
- Born: March 20, 1932; Harrisburg, Pennsylvania, U.S.
- Died: October 3, 2017 (aged 85); Chambersburg, Pennsylvania, U.S.

Playing career
- 1950–1953: West Chester

Coaching career (HC unless noted)
- 1956: Cumberland Valley HS (PA) (assistant)
- 1957–1959: Mount Union HS (PA)
- 1960–1962: Harrisburg HS (PA)
- 1964–1972: Shippensburg

Head coaching record
- Overall: 25–41 (college)

David A. Dolbin Jr. (March 20, 1932 – October 3, 2017) was an American football player and coach. A standout college football player for West Chester University, Dolbin served as the head football coach at Shippensburg University of Pennsylvania from 1964 to 1972, compiling a record of 25–41.
