= Roger Bullen =

Australian rules footballer

Personal information
- Full name: Roger Bullen
- Born: 18 July 1934
- Died: 25 October 2017 (aged 83)
- Original team: Mooroopna
- Height: 180 cm (5 ft 11 in)
- Weight: 76 kg (168 lb)

Playing career^{1}
Years	Club	Games (Goals)
1955–57	Geelong	26 (22)
- ^{1} Playing statistics correct to the end of 1957.

Roger Bullen (18 July 1934 – 25 October 2017) was an Australian rules footballer who played with Geelong in the Victorian Football League (VFL).
