= Christiane Mora =

French politician

Mayor of Loches
- In office 1989–1995

Member of the National Assembly
- In office 21 June 1981 – 4 April 1992
- Succeeded by: Jean-Jacques Descamps
- Constituency: Indre-et-Loire

Personal details
- Born: 14 November 1938
- Died: 11 October 2017 (aged 78)
- Occupation: politician

Christiane Mora (14 November 1938 – 11 October 2017) was a French politician who served on the National Assembly for three terms, from 1981 to 1992 as a representative of Indre-et-Loire. Between 1989 and 1995, she was mayor of Loches.

Mora died on 11 October 2017, aged 78.
