= Richard M. Ryckman =

American psychologist

Richard Ryckman
- Born: May 19, 1937; Buffalo, New York
- Died: October 26, 2017 (aged 80); Hampden, Maine
- Known for: Personality psychology
- Scientific career
- Fields: Psychology
- Workplaces: University of Maine

Richard M. Ryckman (May 19, 1937 – October 26, 2017) was an American psychologist and textbook author. He taught and conducted research in the areas of personality psychology, social psychology, and health psychology at the University of Maine from 1967 until his retirement in 1999.

Ryckman was best known for his textbook, Theories of Personality. His research interests included competitive attitudes and physical and mental health, physical self-efficacy, body image and physique stereotyping, health psychology, and sport psychology. Ryckman authored more than 200 publications, convention papers, and invited addresses on these topics. In 2009, he was named a Fellow of the Society of Experimental Social Psychology.

Ryckman's work on hypercompetitive attitudes was inspired by Karen Horney's theory of neurosis, and her conclusion that some people have a need to win at any cost as a means of maintaining or enhancing self-esteem. Ryckman developed the Hypercompetive Attitude Scale, a 26-item self report test, to measure this tendency. His research found that hypercompetitive individuals are less psychologically healthy and tend to score higher on neuroticism, dogmatism, and mistrust. Ryckman later developed the Personal Development Competitive Attitude Scale to measure healthy attitudes toward competition.
