= Fanya Heller =

Holocaust survivor

Fanya Gottesfeld Heller (October 14, 1924 – October 31, 2017) was a noted Holocaust survivor, author and philanthropist. Born into a traditional Jewish family in a small village in Poland in 1924, she and her family hid from the Nazi death squads with the help of two Christian rescuers.

In 2005 Heller reissued her autobiography under a new title, Love in a World of Sorrow (Devora Publishing, 2005). Originally entitled Strange and Unexpected Love: A Teenage Girl's Holocaust Memoirs (KTAV, 1993), the book is part of suggested reading for courses at Princeton University, University of Connecticut, and Monmouth University, among others. Her writings have also appeared in The New York Times, The Wall Street Journal, Newsweek, and Jewish newspapers nationwide.

Heller obtained a B.A. and an M.A. in psychology from The New School for Social Research, and honorary degrees from Yeshiva University and Bar-Ilan University. She has also studied art history at Columbia university, philosophy and literature at the New School, and family therapy at the akerman Institute. In 1998, the New York State Board of Regents awarded her the Louis E. Yavner Citizen Award in recognition of her contributions to teaching about the Holocaust.

Heller also commissioned an annual conference on Holocaust education at the Museum of Jewish Heritage in New York City. In 1998 she established The Fanya Gottesfeld Heller Center for the Study of Women in Judaism at Bar-Ilan University, examining the female Jewish identity within the context of the social, cultural and religious history of the Jewish people.

She served on the boards of numerous educational institutions and charitable organizations, many of which focus on Jewish education, feminism, and raising awareness about the Holocaust. She lived in New York City and had three children, eight grandchildren, and eleven great-grandchildren. Fanya Gottesfeld Heller died on October 31, 2017.
