= Fred Ray Dorsey =

American politician

Member of the North Carolina House of Representatives from the 42nd district
- In office ???–1979
- Succeeded by: Ralph William Ledford

Personal details
- Born: January 19, 1930 Buncombe County, North Carolina, U.S.
- Died: October 26, 2017 (aged 87)
- Party: Republican
- Spouse: Suzanne Carmichael
- Children: 2

Fred Ray Dorsey (January 19, 1930 – October 26, 2017) was an American politician. He served as a Republican member for the 42nd district of the North Carolina House of Representatives.

== Life and career ==
Dorsey was born in Buncombe County, North Carolina, the son of Jessie Hensley and Fredrick Dorsey. He was president of the North Carolina Wildlife Federation.

Dorsey served three terms for the 42nd district of the North Carolina House of Representatives. He served until 1979, when he was succeeded by Ralph William Ledford. He was a soldier.

Dorsey died in October 2017, at the age of 87.
