= Curtis Ford Jr. =

American politician (1922–2017)

Member of the Texas House of Representatives
- In office January 13, 1953 – January 8, 1957

Personal details
- Born: March 24, 1922 Bronson, Texas, U.S.
- Died: October 3, 2017 (aged 95) Corpus Christi, Texas, U.S.
- Party: Democratic
- Spouse: Gloria Barker

Curtis Edward Ford Jr. (March 24, 1922 – October 3, 2017) was an American politician.

Ford served in the United States Army Air Forces and the United States Marine Corps during World War II. Ford lived in Corpus Christi, Texas. He served as a Democratic member in the Texas House of Representatives from 1953 to 1957. Ford was an unsuccessful candidate for the Texas State Senate in 1956, finishing third in a three candidate race. Shortly after the end of his term in the Texas House, Ford ran for the United States Senate in a special election to replace Price Daniel. Ford received 767 votes, which was the 17th highest vote total in a 23 candidate field.
