= Baron von Lind =

American artist

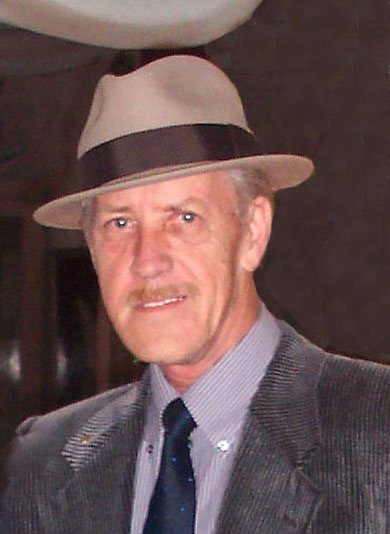
Baron von Lind in 2005

Gerald (Jerry) Lind (October 31, 1937 – October 17, 2017) born in Duluth, Minnesota, also known as Baron von Lind, was an American portrait painter and pin-up artist. He was the son of Baron Johann von Lind of Austria. After he left the United States military in 1989, Lind assumed his ancestral name of "Von Lind".

== Early career ==
Von Lind began his artistic career as a young apprentice in a publishing firm doing graphic art. In later years, he would work in the fields of art direction, magazine art illustration, portrait painter, pin-up artist for calendars, and classical painting.

== Celebrity work ==
Von Lind also worked at Paramount Studios where he painted such stars as Yul Brynner, Sophia Loren, Peter O'Toole and Clint Eastwood to name a few. In 1982, he was approached by the White House to do a painting of then President Ronald Reagan. The painting now hangs in the Reagan Museum in Simi Valley, California.

== Museums ==
Museums that display his works include the Proctor Area Historical Society in Proctor, Minnesota, and the Fifteenth Air Force Museum in Riverside, California. His painting titled 'Mission 207' was dedicated on May 14, 2004 at March Air Force Base and is now permanently displayed as part of the museum's history honoring the men and aircraft of the World War II era.

== Honors ==
In August 2002, 11 official postage stamps were issued by the Republic of Benin in West Africa with von Lind's art.

== Personal ==
Von Lind's brother was killed on a mission over Germany in 1945 while serving in Italy with the 15th Air Force.

Von Lind died in 2017, in North Branch, Minnesota.
