= Fedor Glushchenko =

Russian conductor (1944–2017)

Fedor Ivanovich Glushchenko (Russian: Фёдор Иванович Глущенко; 15 August 1944 – 16 October 2017) was a Ukrainian and Russian conductor and violinist.

== Early life and first performances ==
In 1962 he became a student at the Moscow Conservatory where he took composition lessons under guidance from Sergey Balasanyan and two years later decided to pursue conduction at the Saint Petersburg Conservatory. In 1971 he became conductor-in-chief of the Karelian Radio and Television Symphony Orchestra and two years later became assistant conductor of the National Symphony Orchestra of Ukraine following by becoming music director there in 1977.

== Beginning of career ==
Between 1977 and 1987 he performed in various European cities such Russian Moscow and Saint Petersburg as well as German Berlin, Düsseldorf and Nuremberg, ending with Dublin, Kraków and Sofia. From 1989 to 1994 he performed with various British orchestras such as both London and Royal Liverpool Philharmonic as well as English Chamber Orchestra and The Hallé orchestra in Manchester. From 1990-91, he became Istanbul State Opera conductor with which he performed in such European capitals as Berlin, Prague, Bratislava, Copenhagen, as well as Brno, in Italy. By 1997 he took charge of the Arturo Toscanini orchestra and then became a leader of the RTVE Symphony Orchestra as well.

== Festivals, performances and recordings ==
He also recorded numerous works of Frédéric Chopin, Giya Kancheli, Mikhail Ippolitov-Ivanov and Aram Khachaturian for labels such as Chandos, Hyperion and Olympia Records. He was a frequent participant at festivals such as the Bratislava, Moscow, and Brno Music Festivals, and he produced Prokofiev's ballet Romeo and Juliet for the Athens Festival in 1994. He appeared with numerous well-known Russian musicians such as Daniil Shafran, Grigory Sokolov, Vladimir Spivakov and Maxim Vengerov, as well as the Latvian Gidon Kremer and the Cypriot Martino Tirimo.
