= Clay McShane =

American historian

- Died: Silver Spring, Maryland

Academic background
- Education: City College of New York; Smithsonian Institution; University of Wisconsin–Madison
- Thesis: Wisconsin, Technology and Reform: Street Railways and the Growth of Milwaukee, 1887-1900 (Master's Thesis) ((1975))

Academic work
- Discipline: History
- Sub-discipline: Urban History
- Institutions: Carnegie Mellon University; Northeastern University
- Main interests: American history, urban history, infrastructure, horses
- Notable works: Down the Asphalt Path

Clay McShane (died October 29, 2017) was an American historian.

== Career ==
Clay McShane studied at the City College of New York and graduated in 1968. He received a certificate in the history of technology from the Smithsonian Institution, where he was also a member of the visiting faculty. He continued his graduate education at the University of Wisconsin–Madison, where he earned his MA in 1970 and his PhD in 1975. His master's thesis, Wisconsin, Technology and Reform: Street Railways and the Growth of Milwaukee, 1887-1900, was published as a book in 1975. In 1975 and 1976, he was Visiting Assistant Professor at Carnegie Mellon University. He began his long tenure at Northeastern University in 1976, where he taught history until his retirement in 2012.
