= Linda Richardson =

American judo competitor

Linda Richardson Sarno (1955–2017) is a former American competitor in women's judo. Linda had won the national championship in Women's Judo and a number of international tournaments in Judo. Linda competed in the 56 kg weight class. Linda was coached by Norm Miller. Linda went undefeated for a period, only losing to Lynn Lewis, who was in a different weight class. Linda was eventually inducted into the Wisconsin Hall of Fame for Judo. She was featured in an action shot on the cover of the United States Judo Association's American Judo in December 1976.
