= Nicco Mele =

Ghanaian-American writer (born 1977)

Nicco A. Mele
- Born: September 25, 1977 (age 48); Kumasi, Ghana
- Education: College of William & Mary

Nicco Angelo Mele (born September 25, 1977) is an American academic, writer, and businessman. He is one of several managing directors of the Draper Richards Kaplan Foundation. From 2016 to 2019, he was the director of the Shorenstein Center on Media, Politics and Public Policy, an academic research center in the Harvard Kennedy School at Harvard University that examines media policy and innovation. Mele was previously a senior executive at the Tribune Media Company and deputy publisher at the Los Angeles Times and, prior, the founder and chief executive of Echo&Co, a digital and political consulting firm born out of the presidential campaign for Howard Dean. Earlier, he was the head webmaster for Dean's campaign.

Mele is widely published on matters exploring the intersection of internet policy, new media, journalism and politics. In 2013, his first non-fiction book, "The End of Big", which explored the consequences of our development as a socially-connected society, was published by St. Martin's Press. Mele also predicted Donald Trump's electoral success very early on.

Mele is well known as an entrepreneur and investor in innovative businesses in technology and politics. He also serves on a number of private and nonprofit boards, including the Nieman Foundation for Journalism at Harvard University. He is also co-founder of the Massachusetts Poetry Festival. He previously served as the Wallis Annenberg Chair in Journalism at the University of Southern California. In 2005, Esquire Magazine named Mele one of the "best and brightest" in America and is a frequent expert speaker and social commentator on the societal impacts of technology and the future of journalism. Mele is an advisory board member of Spirit of America, a 501(c)(3) organization that supports the safety and success of Americans serving abroad and the local people and partners they seek to help.

== Books ==
- The End of Big (ISBN 978-1-250-02223-3), St. Martin's Press, 2013
- "What the Cuts Cut: A Field Guide to the Hidden Harm of Government Downsizing" co-authored with Marjorie Stern (ISBN 979-8-9949705-5-3) 2026
