= Göran Witting =

Swedish sailor

Göran Witting (2 April 1925 – 27 October 2017) was a Swedish sailor who competed in the 1960 Summer Olympics.
