= Shamsher Khan =

Indian swimmer

Personal information
- Born: 1933 Kaithepalli, Guntur, Andhra Pradesh
- Died: 15 October 2017 (aged 84)

Sport
- Sport: Swimming

Shamsher Khan (1933 – 15 October 2017) was an Indian swimmer who represented India in the 1956 Summer Olympics. In 1954, he made a national record in the 200-meter butterfly event. He broke the existing national record at the national meet in Bangalore in 1955.

Shamsher Khan was in the Indian Army and also participated in the Indo-China war in 1962 and the war with Pakistan in 1971. He retired from the Indian Army in 1973 with the Subedar rank.
