= Harald E. Esch =

German-American biologist

- Born: December 22, 1931; Düsseldorf, Germany
- Died: October 7, 2017 (aged 85); Farragut, Tennessee
- Occupations: Biologist, academic
- Spouse: Ilse T. Braun
- Awards: Father James L. Shilts/Doris and Gene Leonard Teaching Award, 1998

Academic background
- Education: University of Würzburg; Free University of Berlin; University of Bonn
- Doctoral advisor: Karl von Frisch

Academic work
- Institutions: University of Notre Dame
- Main interests: Bee learning and communication

Harald E. Esch (December 22, 1931 – October 7, 2017) was a German-American biologist and professor. He was a professor at the University of Notre Dame and an international authority on bee communication.

== Early life and education ==
Esch was born on December 22, 1931, in Düsseldorf, Germany. His parents were Helene and Walter Esch.

He studied physics and mathematics at the University of Bonn and the Free University of Berlin. For his doctorate, he studied biology at the University of Würzburg under Karl von Frisch. In 1960, he earned a doctorate in Zoology and Mathematics for his work on insect chemosensory physiology. Esch worked as an Assistant Professor in the Radiation Research Laboratory at LMU Munich, before immigrating to the United States in 1964.

== Career ==
In 1965, Esch became a professor at the University of Notre Dame in the Department of Biology. While at Notre Dame, he taught many popular courses and conducted research.

Throughout his career, Esch had his work published in numerous scientific journals and magazines. These included Scientific American, Science, Journal of Comparative Psychology, The Journal of Experimental Biology, Journal of Comparative Physiology B, and The Science of Nature, among others.

In 1998, Esch was awarded the Father James L. Shilts/Doris and Gene Leonard Teaching Award for his teaching ability. This was the highest award at the Notre Dame College of Science.

== Personal life ==
Esch married Ilse T. Braun in 1955 and had two children, Jan E. Esch and Iris I. Esch-Williams.

== Death ==
Esch died at the age of 85 on October 7, 2017, in Farragut, Tennessee.
