= Metin Ersoy =

Turkish singer (1934–2017)

- Born: 15 April 1934; Istanbul, Turkey
- Origin: Istanbul, Turkey
- Died: 29 October 2017 (aged 83) Istanbul, Turkey
- Genres: Calypso music, Turkish pop music
- Occupations: Singer, composer, actor

Metin Ersoy (15 April 1934 – 29 October 2017) was a Turkish singer. He was born on 15 April 1934 in Istanbul. He graduated from Yeni Kolej highschool. During his youth he played football in the clubs Vefa S.K. and Galatasaray S.K. In 1961 following an injury in a match, he abandoned football.

== Music ==
While playing football he also began singing. In 1956 during his compulsory military service he was sent to Korea to serve in the Turkish brigade in Korea which was active during the Korean War. In Korea, he was both a translator and an entertainer. He used to sing in military mess. Some American soldiers which listened to him, likened Metin Ersoy to Harry Belafonte, the renowned singer of calypso music. After returning home, Metin Ersoy decided to sing calypso in the orchestra of İlham Gencer who called him the "Turkish King of calypso".

== Private life ==
In 1977, he married Tülin Ersoy. The couple had a son named Emir and a daughter named Tuğce. Metin Ersoy died on 29 October 2017 in İstanbul. He was laid to rest in Karacaahmet Cemetery

== Discography and filmography ==
He released 7 singles. Among them, "Vakit Yok, gemi kalkıyor artık" in calypso style was a big success. Between 1978 and 2013 he released 6 albums.

His films were;

1. Son Bahar Yaprakları ("Leaves of Autumn")
2. Boş Yuva ("Empty Home")
3. Gecelerin Ötesi ("Beyond the Nights")
4. Papatya ("Daisy")

== External video ==
External videos
- Ah O gemide ben de olsaydım (from Youtube)
