= Brendan O'Kelly =

Irish footballer (1928–2017)

Brendan O'Kelly (10 June 1928 – 24 October 2017) was an Irish soccer player who played in the 1940s in the League of Ireland. O'Kelly was an attacking player on the amateur Bohemians of the 1940s. He later went on trial at Wolverhampton Wanderers. O'Kelly represented Ireland at the 1948 Olympic Games scoring Ireland's goal.

Off the field, Brendan was a Harvard University graduate and was appointed chairman of Bord Iascaigh Mhara in 1963.
