= Mahama Sawadogo =

Mahama Sawadogo (1954 – 24 October 2017) was a Burkinabé politician and elected lawmaker, who was President of the Congress for Democracy and Progress (CDP) Parliamentary Group in the National Assembly of Burkina Faso when he died.

Sawadogo was High Commissioner of Kadiogo Province and President of the Special Delegation of Ouagadougou from August 1984 to September 1986. Subsequently, he was headmaster of the Marien Ngouabi School from September 1986 to November 1987. In the May 1992 parliamentary election, he was elected to the Assembly of People's Deputies as a candidate of the Organization for Popular Democracy - Labour Movement (ODP-MT) ruling party. In the ruling party, which was eventually transformed into the CDP, Sawadogo became a member of the National Political Bureau. He was re-elected to the legislature (renamed as the National Assembly) in the May 1997 parliamentary election as a CDP candidate.

Sawadogo was a member of the National Assembly's Foreign Affairs and Defense Commission from 1992 to June 2000, variously holding the posts of President, Vice-President, and First Secretary on the Commission. He became Fourth Vice-President of the National Assembly in June 2000 and later became Third Vice-President, while holding responsibility for matters of legislation. In the May 2002 parliamentary election, Sawadogo was re-elected to the National Assembly as a candidate on the CDP's national list. Subsequently, he rejoined the Foreign Affairs and Defense Commission in June 2002; afterwards, he moved to the Social and Cultural Affairs Commission, and became Second Vice-President of the National Assembly in charge of administrative and financial affairs in June 2004.

In the Parliamentary Assembly of La Francophonie, Sawadogo served as President of the Cooperation and Development Commission.

In the May 2007 parliamentary election, Sawadogo was re-elected to the National Assembly as a candidate on the CDP's national list.
