= Herb Raybourn =

Panamanian–American baseball player and scout (1935–2017)

Cecil Herbert Raybourn (1935 – October 21, 2017) was a Panamanian–American baseball player, scout, and executive who served as the Director of Latin American Operations for the New York Yankees of Major League Baseball. In 1990, he signed future Hall of Fame pitcher Mariano Rivera.

== Youth ==
Raybourn was born in Panama City, Panama, in 1935. He was raised by his mother with his two siblings.

Raybourn grew up bilingual and attended Balboa High School (class of 1955) in the former Panama Canal Zone where he played in various Panamanian leagues while earning letters in baseball, football, and track.

== University ==
Raybourn earned a four-year baseball scholarship to attend Bradley University (class of 1959) in Peoria, Illinois. He was twice named to the collegiate All Star team; in his senior year was named Bradley University Baseball Most Valuable Player; and after graduating with a Bachelor of Science in Physical Education, was inducted into the Bradley Athletics Hall of Fame in 1961. During his tenure at Bradley as a catcher - outfielder, Herb led the Bradley Braves to championship wins in 1956, 1957, and 1959 with batting averages of .387, .341, and .366, respectively. He earned a Master of Science in Physical Education from East Texas State University in 1962.

== Professional ==
=== Minor league baseball ===
Raybourn was signed by the San Francisco Giants organization in 1958, and played three seasons in their minor league system as a .300 hitter. In the minors, he was an All-Star player and led the league in 1960 with a .385 batting average. That year, he was named Rookie of the Year.

=== Panamanian Professional Baseball League ===
During off-seasons while playing for the Giants, Raybourn returned to Panama where he was signed as a catcher in the Panamanian Professional Baseball League for the Azucareros de Coclé. During his first year in 1959, he was named the Panamanian Professional League’s Rookie of the Year; in 1961 earned the title of the league’s Batting Champion; and in a year-end competition the same year was unanimously voted Rookie of the Year for all professional sports in Panama. He returned to Panama to teach physical education and coach at Balboa High School in the former Canal Zone.

Raybourn played in the Panamanian Professional Baseball League from 1959 – 1972, until the league folded. In 1972 he transferred to the Panama Canal Company Office of the Civil Affairs Director.

== Scouting ==
Raybourn began scouting in Panama and Latin America for Major League Baseball in 1969. He started his career in scouting with the Pittsburgh Pirates (1969-1976), where he brought Manny Sanguillén, Rennie Stennett, and Omar Moreno to the Pirate organization. Raybourn scouted for the New York Yankees in the 1970s, and again after retiring from the Panama Canal Company in 1987 and moving to Bradenton with his family to become a full-time scout. As a scout for Kansas City Royals (1986-1989), he signed David Howard, Vincent Garibaldo, and Carlos Maldonado. As Director of Latin American Operations for the New York Yankees in the early nineties, Raybourn discovered and signed the soon-to-be Hall of Famer, Mariano Rivera only after having seen nine pitches in an impromptu tryout he organized behind Rivera’s house in Puerto Caimito.

Raybourn later signed Rivera’s cousin Ruben Rivera, relief pitcher Ramiro Mendoza, and outfielder Ricky Ledée for the Yankees. As the Yankees Director of Latin American Operations he built a baseball school in Caracas, Venezuela. He retired from baseball in 1998 as Director of Scouting for the Toronto Blue Jays to pursue other passions—including his grandchildren and the game of golf.

Raybourn died on October 21, 2017.
