= David E. Gratz =

American engineer (1927–2017)

David Elson Gratz (July 7, 1927, in Columbus, Ohio – October 19, 2017) was a professional engineer best known for his work on, and notable for his extensive historical documentation of, the Monongahela Railway. He resided in Brownsville, Pennsylvania.

After graduating in 1950 from the University of Pittsburgh School of Engineering, Gratz started his lifelong career in railroading, working on the Baltimore and Ohio Railroad. In 1957, he began work in the engineering department of the Pittsburgh and Lake Erie Railroad. Later that year, he became Track Supervisor of the Maintenance of Way Department of the Monongahela Railway. In 1961 he was promoted to Division Engineer.

In 1974, Gratz was appointed Superintendent of the Monongahela Railway, a position that he held until 1989 when he became the Director of Real Estate and Labor Relations. He held this position until his retirement in 1992.

After his retirement, Gratz assembled the information that he had gathered across his 35-year affiliation with the Monongahela Railway into a book entitled The Monongahela Railway: Its History and Operation 1903-1993. With access to over 11,000 glass plate and acetate negatives dating from the early 1900s, along with additional photographs by co-author Terry E. Arbogast, historic maps, timetables, and other documentations, Gratz produced the comprehensive 212-page book, published in 2003.

Until August 2008 a location on the Loveridge Secondary was named DAVE after Gratz. The switch sat north of Maidsville and was the start of MN Siding. When NS changed from NORAC Operating Rules to Norfolk Southern's own rules, the Block Limit Station was removed and DAVE was taken off of the timetable.

Gratz died on October 19, 2017, in Brownsville, Pennsylvania.
