= Lawrence Spence =

English cricketer

Personal information
- Full name: Lawrence Arthur Spence
- Born: 14 January 1932; Blaby, Leicestershire, England
- Died: 10 October 2017 (aged 85)
- Nickname: Lol
- Batting: Right-handed
- Bowling: Leg break

Domestic team information
- Years: Team
- 1952–1954: Leicestershire

Career statistics
Competition	First-class
Matches	20
Runs scored	326
Batting average	11.64
100s/50s	0/0
Top score	44
Balls bowled	30
Wickets	0
Bowling average	–
5 wickets in innings	0
10 wickets in match	0
Best bowling	–
Catches/stumpings	4/–
- Source: Cricinfo, 9 February 2013

Lawrence 'Lol' Arthur Spence (14 January 1932 – 10 October 2017) was an English cricketer. He was a right-handed batsman who bowled leg break. He was born at Blaby, Leicestershire.

Spence made his first-class debut for Leicestershire against Warwickshire in the 1952 County Championship at Grace Road, and made eight further appearances in that season. The following season, he made ten first-class appearances, eight of them in the County Championship. His final first-class appearance for the county came in his only match in 1954 against Kent. He made a total of twenty first-class appearances for Leicestershire, scoring 326 runs at an average of 11.64, with a high score of 44. He died in 2017.
