= Hanumant Moreshwar Marathe =

- Born: 2 March 1940
- Died: 2 October 2017 (aged 77)
- Occupation: Journalist
- Years active: 1960–2017

Hanumant Moreshwar Marathe (2 March 1940 – 2 October 2017) (Mr: ह. मो. मराठे), was a journalist and Marathi writer. He was also known by the name 'Ha Mo’ in literary circles.

== Early life ==
He was born on 2 March 1940 at Zolambe, a small village in the Konkan region of Maharashtra. His father was ill due to schizophrenia and his mother was also not well. His elder brother Babal took his responsibility. He started his career with teaching at a college in Kolhapur.

== Career ==
During his illustrious career, he also worked in newspapers and magazines in various capacities, including as an editor. He also worked in Tarun Bharat and Kirloskar magazine. He also did writing in magazines like Lokprabha, Ghardar, Marmik, Navshkati. In 1956, his first write up was published in Saptahik Janayug.

His novel "Kaleshar Pani" was very much controversial due to its content. The matter had gone to court in 1973.

=== Books ===
1. Nishparna Vrikshavar Bhar Dupari निष्पर्ण वृक्षावर भर दुपारी
2. Kaleshar Pani काळेशार पाणी
3. Annanchi Topi (short stories compilation)
4. Baalkand बालकांड
5. News Story न्यूजस्टोरी
6. Kaliyug कलियुग
7. Pakshini पक्षिणी
8. Itivrutta इतिवृत्त
9. Market मार्केट
10. Software सॉफ्टवेअर
11. Haddapar हद्दपार

=== Short stories/articles ===
1. Annanchi topi अण्णांची टोपी (कथासंग्रह)
2. Ajjchi nyika आजची नायिका (उपरोधिक)
3. Itihasatil ek pan इतिहासातील एक अज्ञात दिवस (कथासंग्रह)
4. Ulta aarsa उलटा आरसा (उपरोधिक)
5. Ek manus ek diwas एक माणूस एक दिवस (भाग १ ते ३)
6. Ghoda घोडा
7. Yuddha युद्ध
8. Jwalamukh ज्वालामुख
9. Target टार्गेट
10. Chunav ramayan चुनाव रामायण (व्यंगकथा)
11. Jwalamukh ज्वालामुख (कथासंग्रह)
12. The big boss द बिग बॉस (व्यंगकथा)
13. Dinman दिनमान (उपरोधिक लेख)
14. Devachi ghanta देवाची घंटा
15. N lihilele Vishay न लिहिलेले विषय (वैचारिक)
16. Pahila chaha पहिला चहा (भाग १, २)
17. Pohra पोहरा (आत्मकथा; ’बालकांड’चा २रा भाग)
18. Prastavik प्रास्ताविक
19. Balkand बालकांड (आत्मकथेचा १ला भाग; दुसरा भाग – पोहरा)
20. Bankand and Pohra बालकाण्ड आणि पोहरा : समीक्षा आणि समांतर समीक्षा (संपादक आणि प्रकाशक – ह.मो. मराठे)
21. Madle pan मधलं पान (लेखसंग्रह)
22. Mumbaiche undir मुंबईचे उंदीर (व्यंगकथा)
23. Madhurichya daratil ghoda माधुरीच्या दारातील घोडा (व्यंगकथा)
24. Yuddha युद्ध
25. Lava लावा (हिंदी)
26. Veej वीज (बाल साहित्य)
27. Shrimant Shymachi aaiश्रीमंत श्यामची आई (व्यंगकथा)
28. Swargsukhache package स्वर्गसुखाचे package (विनोदी)
29. Haddapar हद्दपार
30. Aadhi rokhlya banduka aata ugarlya talwari आधी रोखल्या बंदुका आता उगारल्या तलवारी
31. Gandh, shendi, janve ani bhrahman chalval गंध, शेंडी, जानवे आणि ब्राह्मण चळवळ
32. Brahman chalaval kashasathi ब्राह्मण चळवळ कशासाठी?
33. Brahmannidechi navi laat ब्राह्मणनिंदेची नवी लाट
34. Brahmanmanas ब्राह्मणमानस
35. Brahmhnanna aankhi kiti zodnar? ब्राह्मणांना आणखी किती झोडपणार? (२००४)
36. Vidrohi brahmanविद्रोही ब्राह्मण
37. Shivdharm शिवधर्म ...
38. Sant tukaramancha khun kharikharich brahmananni kela asel ka? संत तुकारामांचा खून खरोखरीच ब्राह्मणांनी केला असेल का?

The play Don Special (दोन स्पेशल) was based on his novel News Story.

== Death ==
HM Marathe died following a prolonged illness on 2 October 2017. He was 77. He died at Deenanath Mangeshkar Hospital in Pune where he was undergoing heart-related treatment and had difficulty in breathing.
