= Wayne Velicer =

American psychologist (1944–2017)

- Born: Wayne Frank Velicer; March 4, 1944; Green Bay, Wisconsin
- Died: October 15, 2017 (aged 73)
- Education: University of Wisconsin–Oshkosh; Purdue University
- Known for: Work in quantitative methodology Transtheoretical model of behavior change
- Spouse: Anna Velicer
- Awards: Samuel J. Messick Distinguished Scientific Contributions Award from Division 5 of the American Psychological Association (2013)
- Scientific career
- Fields: Health psychology Quantitative psychology
- Institutions: University of Rhode Island
- Thesis: An empirical comparison of factor analysis, image analysis, and principal component analysis (1972)

Wayne Velicer (March 4, 1944 – October 15, 2017) was an American psychologist known for his research in quantitative and health psychology. He taught at the University of Rhode Island from 1973 until his death in 2017. He worked with James O. Prochaska to help to found the University of Rhode Island's Cancer Prevention Research Center, of which he subsequently served as co-director.

== Honors and awards ==
In 2004, Velicer was one of six University of Rhode Island faculty to be named an ISI Highly Cited Researcher. In 2013, he received the Samuel J. Messick Distinguished Scientific Contributions Award from Division 5 of the American Psychological Association. In 2018, he was posthumously inducted into the University of Rhode Island's Lifetime Service Society.
