= Robert Honeysucker =

American baritone

Robert E. Honeysucker, Jr. (January 14, 1943 – October 7, 2017) was an American baritone. He grew up in the United States South in the 1960s, joined the youth division of the NAACP and worked to register voters for John F. Kennedy. He was a teacher and conducted a choir at Tougaloo College in Mississippi before moving to Boston in 1972. In Boston, he became a regular performer with the Boston Symphony Orchestra, the Boston Pops, and the Boston Lyric Opera. An oratorio, he was known for performances in Mendelssohn's Elijah and Handel’s Messiah. He was also a voice teacher at the Boston Conservatory and the Longy School of Music. With Videmus, he recorded five discs featuring the works of African-American composers.

== Early life and education ==
Honeysucker was born in Memphis, Tennessee on January 14, 1943. His father, Robert E. Honeysucker Sr, was a preacher. He was one of four children of Robert Sr. and Willa Ann Honeysucker.

Honeysucker grew up in the South in the 1960s, becoming an activist for social change at an early age. He joined the youth division of the NAACP and worked to register voters in order to help the election of John F. Kennedy, and befriended activist Medgar Evers. He later earned his bachelor's degree in music education from Tougaloo College and his master's degree from Miami University of Ohio. After completing his graduate studies, he returned to Mississippi to teach and conduct a choir at Tougaloo College. He moved to Boston, Massachusetts in 1972 for additional graduate work at Boston University.

== Performing career ==
Honeysucker was known for his versatility as a performer in Boston's classical music scene, with the Boston Globe noting that he had “performed at one time or another with nearly all of the region’s major classical music and opera organizations, as well as with national and international ensembles.” Beginning in the 1980s, he was a regularly featured performer with the Boston Symphony Orchestra and the Boston Pops. By the 1990s, he was also a regular at the Boston Lyric Opera, performing roles such as Stephen Kumalo in Lost in the Stars, by Kurt Weill and Maxwell Anderson; Master Ford in Verdi's Falstaff; and Escamillo in Carmen on the Common, a public park production of Bizet's Carmen performed for an estimated 140,000 people.

Other roles Honeysucker was known for include Rigoletto, Sharpless, Germont, and Iago. As an oratorio singer, he was known for performances in Mendelssohn's Elijah and Handel’s Messiah. He was also passionate about the Great American Songbook, presenting an annual concert of this material for many years.

Honeysucker was also a voice teacher who taught on the faculties of the Boston Conservatory and the Longy School of Music.

== Discography ==
Honeysucker's recording work includes a collaboration with Videmus to record five discs featuring the works of African-American composers:

1. Music of William Grant Still (New World)
2. Watch and Pray (Koch International)
3. More Still (Cambria)
4. Highway 1, USA (Wm. Grant Still, released by Albany Records)
5. Good News (Videmus Records)

== Press mentions ==
Honeysucker was hailed by the Boston Globe as “a fixture of Boston’s musical landscape over some four decades.”
