= John Phillips (English cricketer) =

English cricketer

Personal information
- Full name: John Burton Phillips
- Born: 19 November 1933; Canterbury, Kent
- Died: 18 October 2017 (aged 83); Banbury, Oxfordshire
- Batting: Right-handed
- Bowling: Right-arm fast-medium
- Role: Bowler

Domestic team information
- Years: Team
- 1955–1957: Oxford University
- 1955: Kent
- FC debut: 30 April 1955 Oxford University v Gloucestershire
- Last FC: 8 May 1957 Oxford University v West Indians

Career statistics
Competition	First-class
Matches	32
Runs scored	151
Batting average	5.39
100s/50s	0/0
Top score	25
Balls bowled	5,205
Wickets	72
Bowling average	35.65
5 wickets in innings	1
10 wickets in match	0
Best bowling	5/52
Catches/stumpings	9/–
- Source: Cricinfo, 20 October 2020

John Burton Phillips (19 November 1933 – 18 October 2017) was an English cricketer. He played in a total of 32 first-class cricket matches between 1955 and 1957.

== Biography ==
Phillips was born at Canterbury in Kent and educated at The King's School, Canterbury before going up to St Edmund Hall, Oxford in 1955. A tall fast bowler, he took 170 wickets as a schoolboy and played for at Lord's for the Public Schools in 1952, his final year at school. He was also a chorister at Canterbury Cathedral whilst at school.

He made his first-class debut for Oxford University in 1955, winning a Blue the same year. He played four matches for Kent County Cricket Club the same season. Phillips played for the university side in the following two seasons, although he did not win another Blue, as well as appearing for Kent's Second XI. He took a total of 72 first-class wickets with his only first-class five-wicket haul coming for Oxford against MCC at Lord's.

After leaving university, Phillips played club cricket for St Lawrence in Kent before moving to Banbury in Oxfordshire where he played for Banbury Cricket Club as well as captaining the town's rugby union club. He worked for Alcan, an aluminium company, and rose to become the company's personnel director. Phillips died at Banbury in 2017 aged 83.
