= Lazhar Bououni =

Tunisian politician

Lazhar Bououni (2 April 1948 – 14 October 2017) was a Tunisian politician. He was the Minister of Justice and Human Rights. Prior to this, he was the Minister of Higher Education and Research.

== Biography ==
Lazhar Bououni was born in Redeyef, Tunisia on 2 April 1948. He received a B.A. in Law in 1970, and a PhD in 1979. He also held the agrégation.

He taught at the University of Tunis, where he was the Dean of the Law School from 1986 to 1989. From 1990 to 1995, he was President of the University of Sousse. From 1999 to 2001, he was the President of Manouba University, and Ambassador to Sweden, Finland, and Iceland.

In 2004, he was appointed as Minister of Higher Education and Research. In 2010, he became Minister of Justice and Human Rights. Bououni died on 14 October 2017, aged 69.
