= Inga Borg =

Swedish Artist and Author

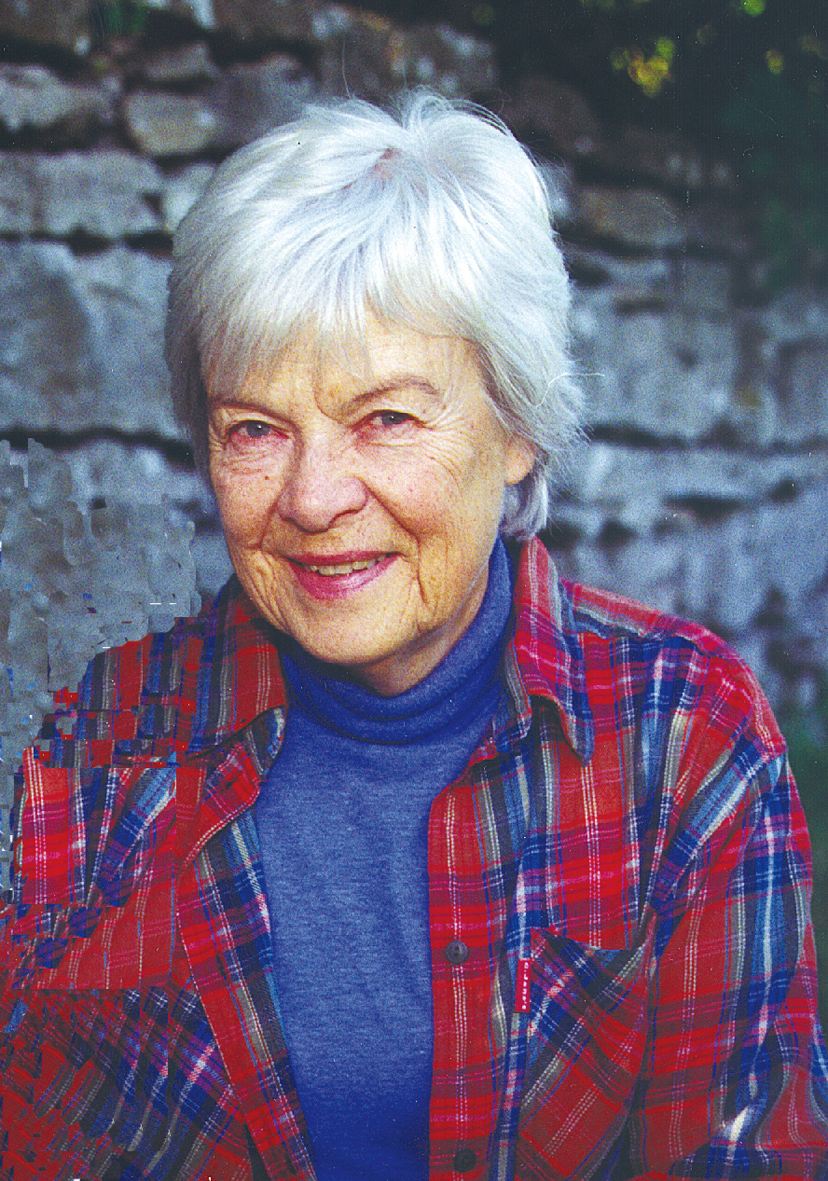
- Inga Borg
- Born: Inga Maria Borg; 25 August 1925; Stockholm, Sweden
- Died: 24 October 2017 (aged 92); Nyköping, Sweden
- Occupation: Author

Inga Maria Borg (25 August 1925 – 24 October 2017) was a Swedish artist and children's book author. She is best known for writing about the fantasy figure Plupp. She was awarded the Elsa Beskow Award for her books about Plupp in 1970.

Inga Borg was the daughter of swimmer Arne Borg.

== Bibliography ==
=== Plupp books ===
- 1955 – Plupp och renarna
- 1956 – Plupp bygger bo
- 1957 – Plupp gör en långfärd
- 1960 – Plupp och lämlarna
- 1964 – Plupp
- 1967 – Plupp reser till havet
- 1969 – Plupp och fågelberget
- 1971 – Plupp åker flotte
- 1972 – Plupp reser till Island
- 1977 – Plupp kommer till stan
- 1982 – Hemma hos Plupp
- 1982 – Vinter hos Plupp
- 1982 – Plupp och vårfloden
- 1982 – Plupp och midnattssolen
- 1983 – Plupp och hans vänner
- 1983 – Plupp och björnungarna
- 1983 – Plupp i storskogen
- 1986 – Plupp och havet
- 1986 – Plupp och tranorna
- 1986 – Plupp och vargen
- 1990 – Plupp och Tuva-Kari i Kolmåreskog
- 1991 – Plupp och all världens djur
- 1996 – Kalas hos Plupp
- 1997 – Plupp och renkalven
- 1998 – Plupp och älgen
- 2005 – Plupp och lodjuret

=== Other books ===
- 1959 – Renen Parrak
- 1961 – Bamse Brunbjörn
- 1962 – Älgen Trampe
- 1963 – Svanen Vingevit
- 1964 – Micke Rödpäls
- 1966 – Tjirr
- 1966 – Agnetas ovanliga dag
- 1968 – Kiiris långa resa under solen
- 1968 – Agnetas dag med pappa
- 1971 – Tobby och Tuss i Vilda matilda
- 1971 – Djuren kring vårt hus
- 1973 – Igelkotten Tryne
- 1974 – Vargas valpar
- 1977 – Dagboksbilder från Island
- 1979 – I naturens riken
- 1981 – Giraffen kan inte sova
- 1982 – Lejonmorgon
- 1983 – När elefanterna dansar
- 1986 – Dagar med Simba
- 1989 – I Lejonland
- 1990 – Tassa berättar
- 1991 – Hund i Paris
- 1993 – Sommarlammet
- 1995 – Katten Matisse och hans hundar
