= Jeanne Brousse =

French Resistance member (1921–2017)

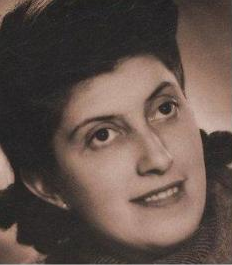
- Born: Maurier; 12 April 1921; Saint-Pierre-de-Curtille, France
- Died: 19 October 2017 (aged 96); Annecy, France
- Known for: Righteous Among The Nations

Jeanne Brousse (French pronunciation: [ʒan bʁus]; née Maurier; 12 April 1921, Saint-Pierre-de-Curtille – 19 October 2017, Annecy), known as Jeannette, was born in Saint-Pierre-de-Curtille in the Savoie region of France. She was a member of the French Resistance during WWII and she is a member of the Righteous Among The Nations.

== Biography ==
Jeanne Maurier grew up in Annecy, France. Her father, a former combatant in World War I who had been gassed by the Germans, worked at the local prefecture in Haute-Savoie. At age 18, she wanted to study in Paris to become a nurse with the French Red Cross, but the declaration of war prevented her from pursuing her plans.

=== During the war (1939–1945) ===
After doing some other work, Maurier became a civil servant at the local Haute-Savoie prefecture in Annecy. She was assigned to the Refugee Naturalization Service, initially as an assistant, and later as a full-fledged employee. In 1941, she joined the newly created Refugee Service, which had been designed to help people who were just arriving to the region. She relayed safe passages information to Jews who were arrested once they are discovered upon arrival at the train station. In November 1942, a woman by the name of Suzanne Aron approached her for help with her ID cards. Her husband, Francis Aron, a reserve officer in the army who was injured in 1940 and received the Legion of Honor, had burnt their ID papers so that, as Jews, they wouldn't have to wear the yellow star. Suzanne Aron also needed ID cards for the three daughters of Henri Schilli, the rabbi of Valence, France, who were under her care. In the same year, Maurier was also providing false documents to Father Camille Folliet, a chaplain for the Catholic youth movement who was helping Jews cross the border. During this time, she was recorded a secretary at the Annecy prefecture.

Maurier began to make fake ID cards, four of them under the name Caron, and three for the Schilli daughters under the name Sureau. The girls, as well as the Aron children, found a hiding place in the farm belonging to Jeanne's maternal grandparents.

By February 1943, Maurier was helping young men born in 1919, 1920, and 1921 to escape the call for mandatory service. Through her job at the prefecture, she obtained a night pass, which allowed her to travel past curfew. After seeing at work the names of the young men who were to be summoned for mandatory service, she took advantage of her night pass in order to go and warn the families. During that period, men started to arrive from other regions to hide in the mountains. She provided them with fake ID cards, which listed their place of birth as either being a French city that had been bombed, or a town in North Africa, in order that their civil status could not be verified.

In March 1943, Maurier met Geneviève de Gaulle, who was looking for someone who could distribute newspapers clandestinely. She helped de Gaulle furnish falsified documents to the men who refused to comply with mandatory service. She helped refugees cross the border into Switzerland with the assistance of some of the Annemasse-Geneva railroad workers, the Protestant community in Annemasse, and the wife of the Protestant pastor, Jeanne Bach.

In September 1944, Maurier married Jean Brousse, a colleague from the prefecture who worked in the office of the prefect. He had previously been imprisoned, along with other men, during a French militia raid.

=== After the war ===
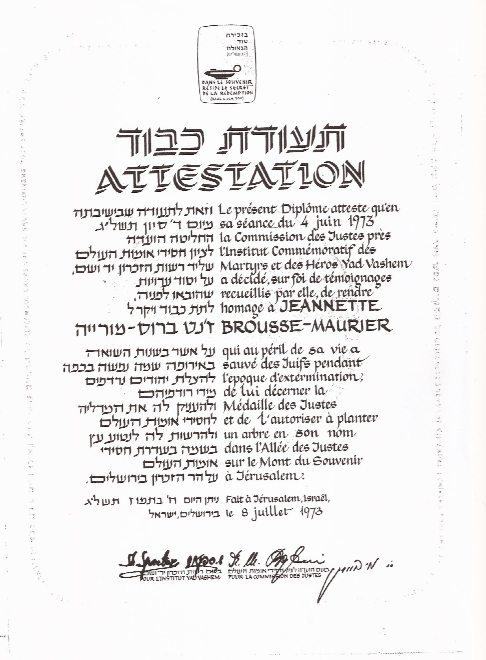
Jeanne Brousse- Attestation- Righteous Among The Nations .1973

After the war, Rabbi Schilli, now head of the Israeli Seminary of France, testified about Brousse's role in saving his life as well as those of his three daughters: Françoise, Nicole, and Danielle.

In 1973, the state of Israel awarded Brousse the title of Righteous Among The Nations. In 1974, the General Consul of Israel in Paris bestowed on her the medal of the Righteous Gentiles, and she was invited to plant a tree at the Yad Vashem Memorial in Jerusalem.

In 1981, Brousse was one of the founding members of the French chapter of the association of the Righteous Among The Nations. In 1987, she joined the French Yad Vashem committee, of which she remained the Vice President for several years. She was also the honorary president of the "Heroic Saviors of Haute-Savoie." She participated in the "Concours national de la résistance et de la deportation," sharing her experience in schools and during National Day Against Racism and Antisemitism ceremonies. She was a member of the jury for the departmental competition on resistance and deportation.

Very active in these associations, Brousse also served as secretary of the local chapter of the Veterans of the Secret Army, as well as for the Union of Volunteer Combatants of the Resistance.

On 2 November 1997, in the presence of Catherine Trautmann, the spokesperson for the French government, Brousse inaugurated the National Memorial of the Righteous in Thonon-les-Bains.

In March 2005, Brousse accompanied the official French delegation led by Prime Minister Jean-Pierre Raffarin to attend the inauguration of the new Yad Vashem Museum in Jerusalem dedicated to the Shoah, in the presence of Simone Veil.

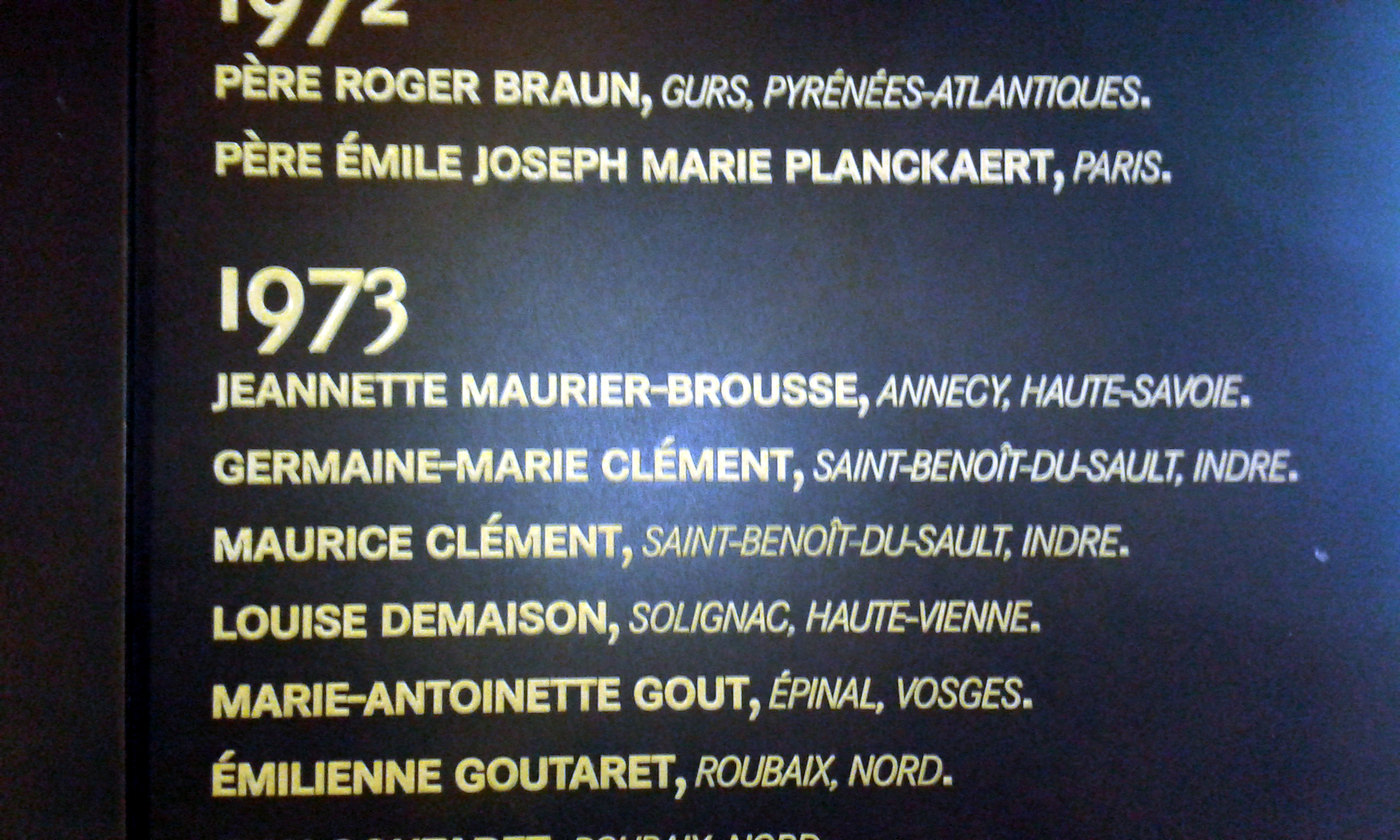
Jeannette Maurier-Brousse - Shoah Memorial in Paris

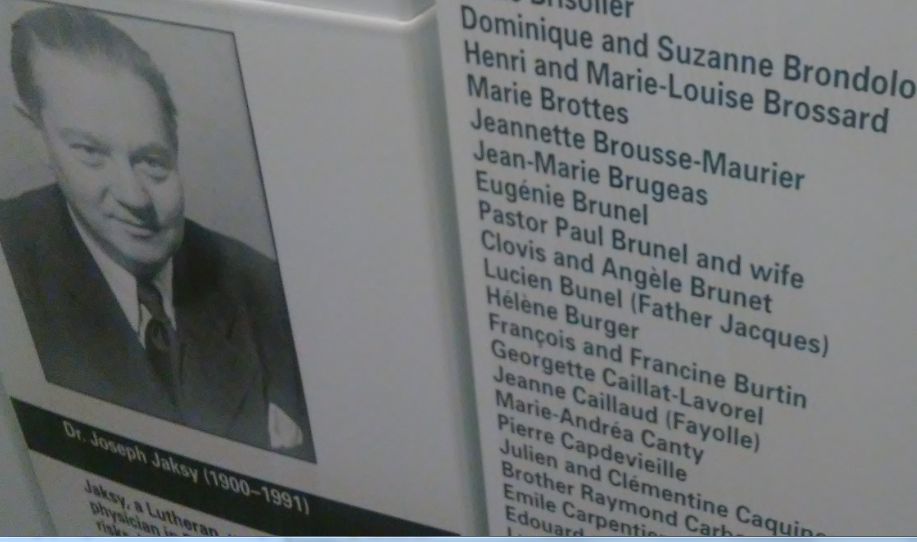
Jeannette Maurier-Brousse- U.S. Holocaust Memorial Museum - Washington

Her name can be found on the Wall of the Righteous in the Mémorial de la Shoah in Paris, inaugurated in 2006 and is included on the Wall of Honor of Rescuers of the Holocaust in the U.S. Holocaust Memorial Museum.

In 2008, the Circus Theater paid Brousse homage with its play The Rebellious Righteous. On April 18, 2014, a new addition to the Haute-Savoie préfecture, the Migration and Integration Services Building, was dedicated in her name.

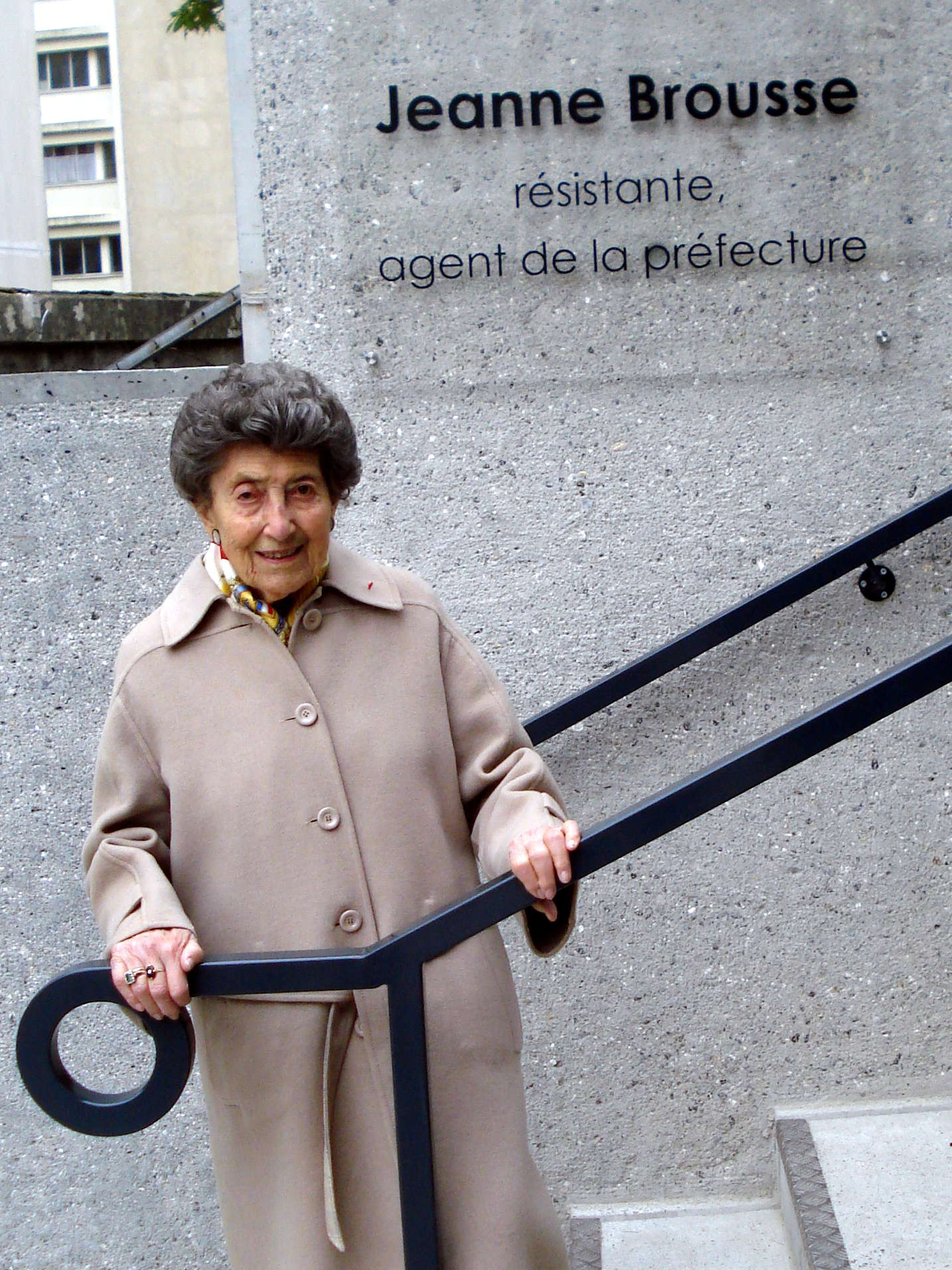
Jeanne Brousse in 2014 at the Préfecture of Haute-Savoie

Describing herself, Brousse said: "I am not a hero, I am not a lecturer. I am, quite simply, an ordinary woman who lived through extraordinary times." She died on 20 October 2017 at the age of 96.

== Honours and awards ==
- 1973 Righteous Among The Nations
- 2005 Legion of Honour

== Bibliography ==
- Jean-Claude Plat et Bernard Iselin, Ces dames qui ont illustré la Savoie, p. 179-190, 2003.
- Agnès Poncet et Isabelle Wagner, Les armes de Jeanne (1940-1945), editions le Vieil Annecy, 2005.
- Israel Gutman, Lucien Lazare, Dictionnaire des Justes de France, Jérusalem et Paris, Yad Vashem et Arthème Fayard, 2003, p126
- Jean-Marie Jeudy, Femmes et rebelles du XVe au XXIe siècle en Savoie, Éditions en Train de lire, 2007, p. 183-200.
- Martin Gilbert, The Righteous: The Unsung Heroes of the Holocaust, Holt Paperbacks, 2004, p. 283-284

== Filmographie ==
- 1993 - Tsedek- Les Justes, by Clara et Marek Halter, 2h30
- 1998 - Le courage discret des justes, Envoyé spécial, 2 avril 1998, France 2

== Podcast ==
January 2017- Les gens d'ci.,
