= Mila Hernando =

Spanish diplomat

- Born: Milagros Hernando Echevarría; 12 January 1957; Bilbao, Spain
- Died: 23 October 2017 (aged 60); Madrid, Spain
- Occupation: Diplomat
- Years active: 1988–2017
- Known for: Ambassador of Spain to Lebanon

Milagros Hernando Echevarría (12 January 1957 – 23 October 2017) was a Spanish diplomat.

== Biography ==
After earning licentiates in Political Science and Sociology, Mila Hernando entered the diplomatic field in 1988. Her first postings were in Peru and the Czech Republic. Back in Madrid, she held the position of advisory member of the Cabinet of the Secretary of State for Foreign Policy for the European Union. A few months later, she was appointed Cabinet Chief of the then Secretary of State for European Affairs, Ramón de Miguel. With the arrival of Rodríguez Zapatero, she was appointed General Director of Planning and Evaluation of Policies for Development at the Agency for International Cooperation, providing aid to the poor. Once again in Madrid, she held the directorship of the Department of International Policy and Security of the Cabinet of the President of the Government.

Under the Rajoy government, Hernando was named ambassador to Lebanon from May 2012 to April 2017, being the first woman to occupy that position. During her stay in Lebanon, she had to handle the death of Spanish Corporal Francisco Javier Soria, who was killed by Israeli gunfire, and take charge of the diplomatic representation of Syria, whose embassy was closed at the beginning of the civil war in that country.

Suffering from cancer, she returned to Madrid, where she held the position of ambassador in the Special Mission for Mediterranean Affairs.

Mila Hernando died in Madrid on 23 October 2017. A funeral was held in Beirut in her memory, with hundreds of people in attendance.
