= German Historical Institute Moscow =

Russian-based German research institute

The German Historical Institute Moscow was a history institute of the Max Weber Stiftung based in Moscow, Russia. The founding director was Bernd Bonwetsch, the director in 2024 was Sandra Dahlke.

In June 2024 Russia declared the institute an undesirable organization. The Institute formally closed in November 2025.

== See also ==
- Germany–Russia relations
