= Plupp =

Protagonist of children's books by Inga Borg

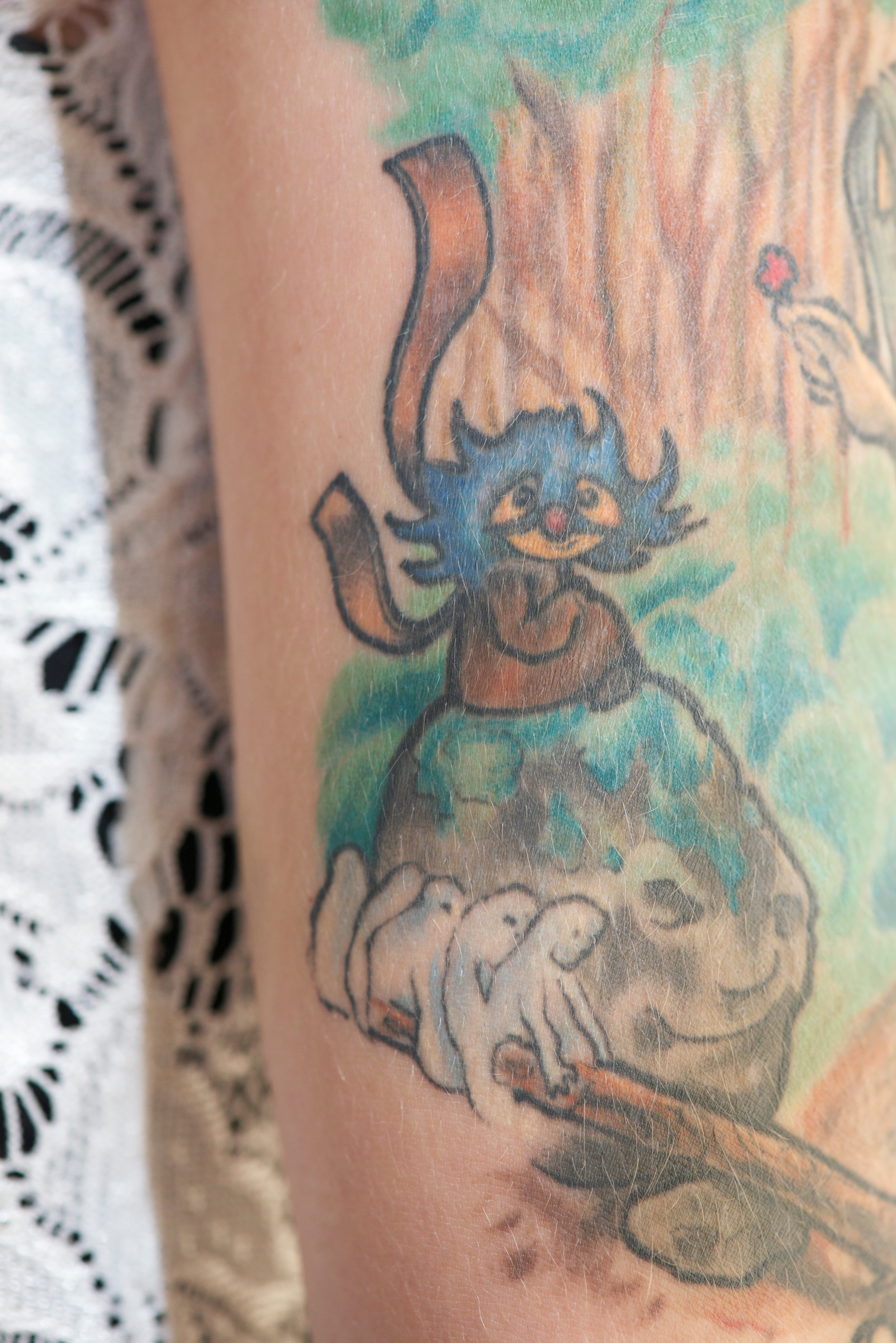
- Tattoo of Plupp sitting on a rock
- Author: Inga Borg
- Country: Sweden
- Language: Swedish
- Genre: Children's literature

Plupp is the protagonist of a series of children's books by Swedish author Inga Borg (1925–2017), who first created the character in 1955. Plupp is a small figure with blue hair and a red nose, who lives in a kåta by a lake called Blåvattnet ('Blue Waters') somewhere in the far north.

Borg describes the character as an invisibling (meaning that Plupp is invisible to humans) who is both human and animal in nature. She further explains that Plupp is neither male nor female, as she wanted to create a character that children of both sexes could identify with. Plupp also has the ability to talk with animals; two of their closest friends are the lemming Lämmel and the stoat Hermelin.

The books about Plupp have been translated into Danish, Inari Sami, Northern Sami, Skolt Sami, English, Esperanto, Finnish, French, Faroese, Greenlandic, Icelandic, Norwegian, and German. In 1968, Borg adapted the books into the animated TV series Plupp och hans vänner ('Plupp and his friends').

In 1970, Borg received the Elsa Beskow Award for the Plupp books.

== Books ==
- Plupp och renarna ('Plupp and the Reindeer', 1955)
- Plupp bygger bo ('Plupp Builds a goahti', 1956)
- Plupp gör en långfärd ('Plupp on a Long Trip', 1957)
- Plupp och lämlarna ('Plupp and the Lemmings', 1960), new edition 1982
- Plupp (1964), edition with 4 previous books
- Plupp reser till havet ('Plupp Travels to the Sea', 1967)
- Plupp och fågelberget ('Plupp and the Bird Mountain', 1969)
- Plupp åker flotte ('Plupp Goes Rafting', 1971)
- Plupp reser till Island ('Plupp Travels to Iceland', 1972)
- Plupp kommer till stan ('Plupp in the City', 1977)
- Hemma hos Plupp ('At Home with Plupp', 1982)
- Vinter hos Plupp ('Plupp's Winter', 1982)
- Plupp och vårfloden ('Plupp and the Spring Flood', 1982)
- Plupp och midnattssolen ('Plupp and the Midnight Sun', 1982)
- Plupp och hans vänner ('Plupp and His Friends', 1983)
- Plupp och björnungarna ('Plupp and the Bear Cubs', 1983)
- Plupp i storskogen ('Plupp in the Great Forest', 1983)
- Plupp och havet ('Plupp and the Sea', 1986)
- Plupp och tranorna ('Plupp and the Cranes', 1986)
- Plupp och vargen ('Plupp and the Wolf', 1986)
- Plupp och Tuva-Kari i Kolmåreskog ('Plupp and Tuva-Mari in Kolmåre Forest', 1990)
- Plupp och all världens djur ('Plupp and all the Animals of the World', 1991), 1992 calendar
- Kalas hos Plupp ('Plupp's Party', 1996)
- Plupp och renkalven ('Plupp and the Reindeer Calf', 1997)
- Plupp och älgen ('Plupp and the Moose', 1998)
- Plupp och lodjuret ('Plupp and the Lynx', 2005)
