= Jan McLelland =

English dermatologist

Jan McLelland FRCP
- Born: Janet McLelland; 26 September 1957; Newcastle, England
- Died: 5 October 2017 (aged 60)
- Education: University College London Medical School
- Occupation: dermatologist
- Medical career
- Field: dermatology
- Sub-specialties: genital skin conditions

Janet (Jan) McLelland FRCP (26 September 1957 – 5 October 2017) was an English consultant dermatologist, clinical director, researcher and prolific medical author. Her specialism was genital skin conditions.

== Biography ==
McLelland was born on 26 September 1957 in Newcastle to Jean Margaret (née Forrester) a school teacher, and Thomas McLelland, a police officer. She attended Dame Allan's School, going on to study medicine at University College London Medical School graduating first with a BSc in pharmacology before completing her medical studies in 1981. After completing her training at University College Hospital and in Newcastle, she took up a position, in 1985, as a research fellow at the Royal Postgraduate Medical School and honorary dermatology registrar at Hammersmith and Great Ormond Street hospitals. Her MD thesis was entitled, Studies relating to Langerhan cell histiocytosis.

She continued her training as a registrar and senior registrar in Newcastle, becoming Clinical Director for Dermatology at Newcastle upon Tyne NHS Trust.

At Newcastle McLelland introduced reforms to the management of waiting lists and the prioritisation of cancer patients. The reforms lead to a Beacon Award for Excellence. In recognition for her work on reforms she was invited to 10 Downing Street to meet with then Prime Minister Tony Blair.

In 1989 McLelland and Sam Shuster filed for a patent for an allergy patch testing. The patent was published in 1991 and no longer in force on 27 April 1994.

In 2010 McLelland co-developed, on behalf of the British Association of Dermatologists, quality standards for dermatology services. She published more than 80 academic papers.

McLelland was married to Dr Paul Cowie, had a sister, Caroline and a son, James. She was a keen amateur golfer with a handicap of 14 and Ladies' captain of the Close House Club.

== Awards ==
McLelland was a Fellow of the Royal College of Physicians.
