= Piergiuseppe D'Andreamatteo =

Italian politician (1944–2017)

Member of the Chamber of Deputies
- In office 23 April 1992 – 14 April 1994

Personal details
- Born: 8 January 1944 Cepagatti
- Died: 22 October 2017 (aged 73) Pescara
- Party: Italian Socialist Party

Piergiuseppe D'Andreamatteo (8 January 1944 – 22 October 2017) was an Italian politician.

Born in Cepagatti on 8 January 1944, Piergiuseppe D'Andreamatteo became active in the Italian General Confederation of Labour, serving as secretary general of the organization's Pescara chapter. He served on the Pescara municipal and provincial councils before election to a single term as member of the Chamber of Deputies between 1992 and 1994, after which D'Andreamatteo retired from politics.

D'Andreamatteo died at the age of 73 on 22 October 2017 at the Hospital of the Holy Spirit in Pescara.
