= Bernd Bonwetsch =

German historian (1940–2017)

Bernd Bonwetsch (17 October 1940 – 13 October 2017) was a German historian, the founding director in 2003 of the German Historical Institute Moscow.

== Early life and education ==
Bernd Bonwetsch was born in Berlin on 17 October 1940. From 1962 to 1967, he studied History, Slavic studies and Comparative education at the University of Hamburg and at the Free University of Berlin. He then studied at Stanford University, 1968-69.

== Career ==
Bonwetsch joined the History Department at University of Hamburg in 1972. From 1973 to 1980 he was assistant professor at the Department of East European History and Geography of the University of Tübingen. Bonwetsch taught from 1980 to 2003 as a professor of Eastern European history at the University of Bochum. This teaching activity was interrupted only by stays abroad in 1992 and 1993. In 1992 he was a visiting professor at the University of Innsbruck and 1993 at the Kemerovo State University. In 2000 he received an honorary doctorate from the Kemerovo State University and in 2004, he received from the Karasin National University Kharkiv another honorary doctorate.

In 2003, he was the founding director of the German Historical Institute Moscow.

He died on 13 October 2007, aged 76.

== Selected publications ==
- Kriegsallianz und Wirtschaftsinteressen. Die Stellung Rußlands in den Wirtschaftsplänen Englands und Frankreichs 1914-1917. Düsseldorf: Bertelsmann Universitätsverlag, 1973 (Studien zur modernen Geschichte 10).
- Die russische Revolution 1917. Eine Sozialgeschichte von der Bauernbefreiung 1861 bis zum Oktoberumsturz. Darmstadt: Wissenschaftliche Buchgesellschaft, 1991.
- (zusammen mit Rolf Binner und Marc Junge) Massenmord und Lagerhaft: Die andere Geschichte des Großen Terrors (= Veröffentlichungen des Deutschen Historischen Instituts Moskau; Bd. 1). Berlin: Akademie Verlag, 2009. ISBN 978-3-05-004662-4; Wladislaw Hedeler: Rezension zu Massenmord und Lagerhaft. In: H-Soz-u-Kult vom 18. Mai 2010.
- (Hg. zusammen mit Rolf Binner und Marc Junge) Stalinismus in der sowjetischen Provinz 1937–1938: Die Massenaktion aufgrund des operativen Befehls Nr. 00447 (=Veröffentlichungen des Deutschen Historischen Instituts Moskau; Bd. 2). Berlin: Akademie Verlag, 2010. ISBN 978-3-05-004685-3
- Mit und ohne Russland: eine familiengeschichtliche Spurensuche. Essen: Klartext Verlag, 2017.
