= Dale Hagerman =

American businessman (1927–2017)

- Born: August 5, 1927; Flint, Michigan, US
- Died: October 9, 2017 (aged 90); Fenton Township, Michigan, US
- Education: Ferris State College
- Occupations: pharmacist and businessman
- Known for: co-founder of Diplomat Pharmacy
- Spouse: Janet Huston (m. 1949)
- Children: 5, including Phil Hagerman

Dale Hagerman (August 5, 1927 – October 9, 2017) was an American pharmacist and businessman, and co-founder of Diplomat Pharmacy with his son Phil Hagerman.

== Early life ==
Dale Hagerman was born on August 5, 1927, in Flint, Michigan, one of eight children of Ray and Mildred (Stocking) Hagerman.

Hagerman received a bachelor's degree in pharmacy from Ferris State College.

== Career ==
He was a partner in Ideal Pharmacy which had four stores in Flint, Michigan. In 1975, he sold his stake, bought a store in Flushing Road, and founded Diplomat Pharmacy with his son, Phil, who was about to graduate from college. It is now the largest speciality pharmacy chain in the US.

== Personal life ==
On August 20, 1949, he married Janet Huston in Fenton, Michigan.

They had five children.

He died on October 9, 2017, at his home in Fenton Township Michigan, aged 90.
