= Rudolf Gorenflo =

German mathematician (1930–2017)

Rudolf Gorenflo (31 July 1930 – 20 October 2017) was a German mathematician.

== Biography ==
Gorenflo was born on July 31, 1930, in Friedrichstal, Germany. From 1950 to 1956 he attended Karlsruhe Institute of Technology from which he received his diploma in mathematics. From 1957 to 1961 he became a scientific assistant there and for a year later worked at Standard Electric Lorenz Company. From 1962 to 1970 he worked at the Max Planck Institute for Plasma Physics, at Garching not too far away from Munich. He was a resident in mathematics at the Technical University in Aachen in 1970 and a year later became a professor there.

In 1972 he was invited as a guest professor to the University of Heidelberg and only by October 1973 became a full-time professor at the Free University of Berlin. In 1995 he became a professor at the University of Tokyo and by October 1998 returned to Free University as professor emeritus. During his life he collaborated with scientists from China, Israel, Italy, Japan, former Soviet Union, United States and Vietnam.

== Academic work ==
As of 2013, he had published over 250 peer-reviewed articles, one of which has over 1800 citations. His works have appeared in such journals as the Journal of Vibration and Control and various Journal of Physics journals.
