= Cosimo Mele =

Italian politician (1957–2017)

Cosimo Mele (7 March 1957, Carovigno – 7 October 2017) was an Italian politician.

He was elected to the Chamber of Deputies and served one term, until 2008. Mele was the mayor of Carovigno from 2013 until February 2015, when he resigned. On 7 October 2017, Mele died, aged 60, of a brain ischemia.
