= Diplomat Pharmacy =

Provider of specialty pharmacy services in the United States

Diplomat Pharmacy, Inc.
- Traded as: NYSE: DPLO
- Industry: Pharmaceutical
- Founded: 1975; 50 years ago in Flint, Michigan
- Founder: Dale Hagerman; Philip Hagerman
- Headquarters: Flint, Michigan, United States
- Key people: Brian Griffin (CEO)
- Number of employees: 2,298 (2017)
- Website: www.diplomatpharmacy.com

Diplomat Pharmacy, Inc. was the largest independent provider of specialty pharmacy services in the United States. The company partners with manufacturers, payers, providers, hospitals, and more. Headquartered in Flint, Michigan, Diplomat has facilities across the United States and dispenses drugs in all 50 states. Diplomat offers specialized medication and medication management programs for patients with complex and chronic conditions such as cancer, hepatitis, multiple sclerosis, HIV and others.

In October 2014, Diplomat Pharmacy launched an initial public offering (IPO) on the New York Stock Exchange after raising $173 million. Diplomat is the only publicly traded company in the United States that offers a specialty pharmacy independent of pharmacy benefit manager, health plan, retail chain, or wholesaler ownership.

== Services ==
Diplomat distributes many medications in CarePak adherence packaging, specially designed to improve patient adherence. Diplomat also serves as the specialty pharmacy for many retail pharmacies, hospitals and health systems throughout the United States.

For hemophilia and other blood disorder patients, they offer in-home and outpatient specialty infusion services.

=== Accreditations ===
Diplomat is accredited by third-party agencies including URAC, the American Society of Health-System Pharmacists, Accreditation Commission for Health Care, Health Information Trust Alliance, and the Center for Pharmacy Practice Accreditation. The company also holds Verified-Accredited Wholesale Distributors and Verified Internet Pharmacy Practice Sites accreditations from the National Association of Boards of Pharmacy.

== History ==
Dale Hagerman and his son Philip Hagerman cofounded Diplomat Pharmacy in 1975 in Flint, Michigan. In 1991, Philip Hagerman became chairman and CEO. In December 2010, Diplomat moved its headquarters back to a distribution facility in Flint from Swartz Creek, Michigan.

In 2014, Diplomat ranked 69th on the Inner City 100 list of the fastest growing companies based in inner cities. In July 2014, Diplomat acquired MedPro Rx, a specialty pharmacy based in North Carolina. In October 2014, Diplomat went public, after raising $173 million for its IPO.

In February 2015, Diplomat acquired BioRx, a specialty pharmacy in Cincinnati, Ohio for $315 million. In June 2015, Diplomat acquired Philadelphia-based Burman’s Specialty Pharmacy for $73 million.

In June 2016, Diplomat acquired Valley Campus Pharmacy Inc., doing business as TNH Advanced Specialty Pharmacy, a specialty pharmacy focusing on oncology, hepatitis, and immunology. In December 2016, Diplomat combined several subsidiary companies under one name—Diplomat Specialty Infusion Group.

In February 2017, Diplomat acquired Affinity Biotech Inc., a specialty pharmacy and infusion services company in Houston, Texas. In March 2017, Diplomat acquired Comfort Infusion, a company specializing in globulin therapy, based in Birmingham, Alabama. Comfort Infusion became part of the Diplomat Specialty Infusion Group. In May 2017, Diplomat acquired WRB Communications Inc., a provider of relationship management programs for pharmaceutical manufacturers and healthcare service organizations. In September 2017, Diplomat acquired Focus Rx Pharmacy Services Inc., a provider of home infusion and specialty prescription management services. In October 2017, Diplomat acquired 8th Day Software and Consulting LLC, based in Tennessee.

On October 9, 2017, co-founder Dale Hagerman died at the age of 90. In November 2017, Diplomat acquired Pharmaceutical Technologies Inc., doing business as National Pharmaceutical Services (NPS). NPS is a pharmacy benefit manager based in Omaha, Nebraska. In December 2017, Diplomat acquired Leehar Distributors LLC, doing business as LDI Integrated Pharmacy Services, from Nautic Partners LLC, Oak HC/FT Partners LLC, and management. LDI is a full-service pharmacy benefit manager based in St. Louis, Missouri.

On January 5, 2018, Phil Hagerman announced his retirement and Jeff Park was appointed interim CEO. In April 2018, Diplomat introduced CastiaRx, a combination of acquired pharmacy benefit managers LDI and NPS. In May 2018, Diplomat announced Brian Griffin as its new CEO and chairman of the board of directors, effective June 4, 2018. Griffin was hired from Anthem, Inc., where he served as CEO of in-house pharmacy benefit manager IngenioRx.

In December 2019, it was announced that Diplomat was being acquired by OptumRX, a subsidiary of UnitedHealth Group, for $300 million.
