= Howard L. Kennedy =

American politician

Member of the South Dakota House of Representatives
- In office 1981–1992

Personal details
- Born: April 13, 1928 Beresford, South Dakota, U.S.
- Died: October 31, 2017 (aged 89) Beresford, South Dakota, U.S.
- Party: Republican
- Spouse: Alice Mae Larson (m. 1949)
- Children: 5
- Profession: farmer, livestock feeder

Howard Lloyd Kennedy (April 13, 1928 – October 31, 2017) was an American politician in the state of South Dakota. He was a member of the South Dakota House of Representatives from 1981 to 1992. He was a farmer and livestock feeder, and served as mayor of Beresford, South Dakota, for eight years.
