= Ian Baxter =

British Army officer

Major-General Ian Stuart Baxter CBE (20 July 1937 – 17 October 2017) was a British Army officer who played a crucial role in organising at short notice the logistics for the British forces in the Falklands War for which he was appointed a CBE.
