= Lynn Lewis (judoka) =

American judoka

Lynn Lewis was a former competitor in judo. Originally from Revere, Massachusetts, United States. She won three gold medals in the US National Judo Championships, with her first at the age of 17. She was trained by James Pedro Sr. She was also trained by Rusty Kanokogi. She earned 5th place in the first Women's World Judo Championship. She additionally earned 2 golds and a silver in international judo competition.
